= Tennessee State Capitol =

Capitol building of the U.S. state of Tennessee

- U.S. National Register of Historic Places
- U.S. National Historic Landmark
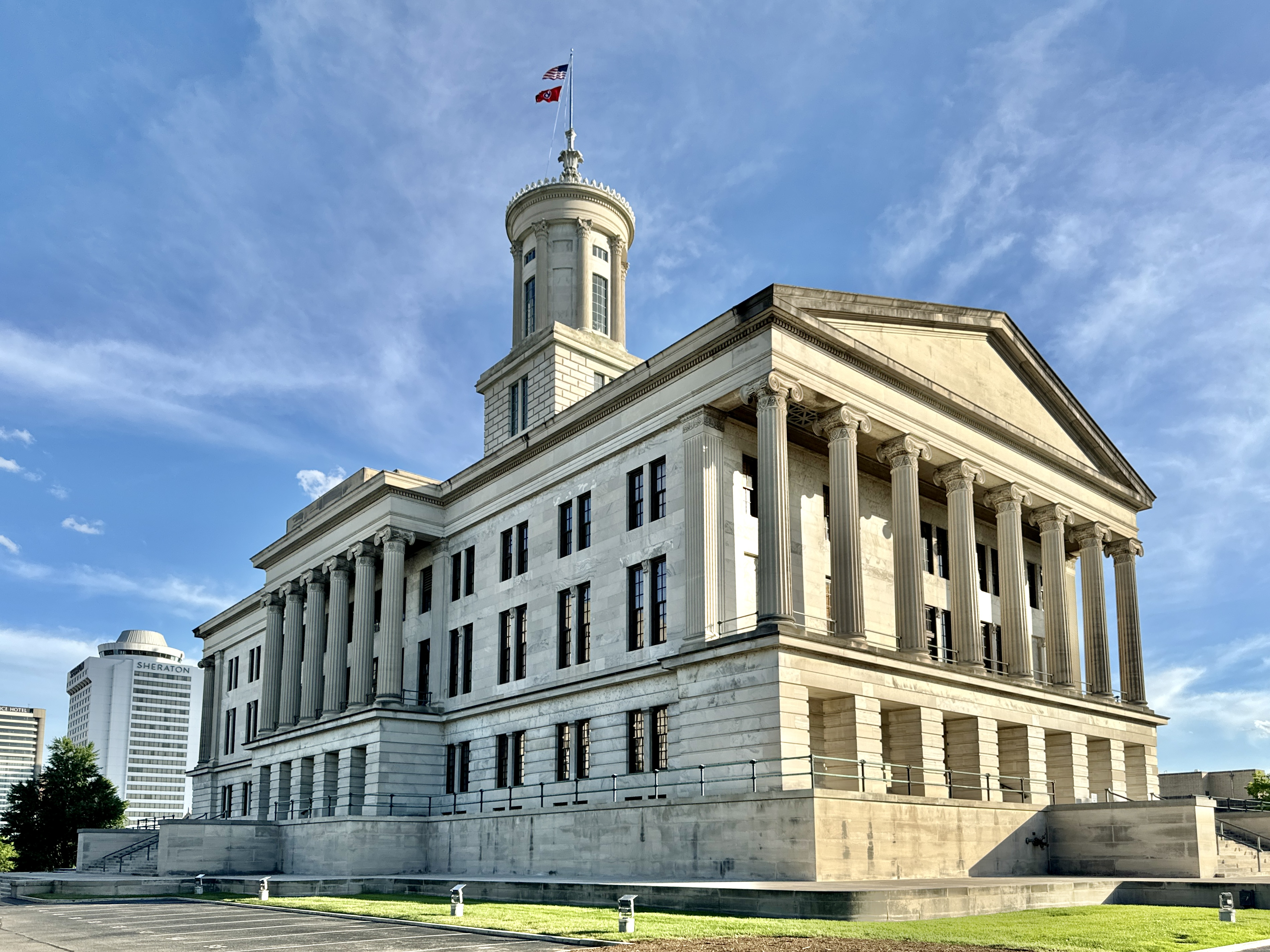
- Tennessee State Capitol in 2024

- Location within Tennessee Location within the United States
- Location: Capitol Hill; Nashville, Tennessee
- Coordinates: 36°9′57″N 86°47′3″W
- Area: 4.9 acres (2.0 ha)
- Built: 1845–1859
- Architect: William Strickland (1788–1854)
- Architectural style: Greek Revival
- NRHP reference No.: 70000894

Significant dates
- Added to NRHP: July 8, 1970; 56 years ago
- Designated NHL: November 11, 1971; 55 years ago

The Tennessee State Capitol, located in Nashville, is the seat of government for the U.S. state of Tennessee. It serves as the home of both houses of the Tennessee General Assembly – the House of Representatives and the Senate – and contains the governor's office. It was designed by architect William Strickland of Philadelphia, who considered it his greatest achievement. The statehouse was built between 1845 and 1859 by skilled artisans and convict and slave labor. It is one of Nashville's most prominent examples of Greek Revival architecture, and is one of the oldest working statehouses in the United States, having been used continuously since 1853. It was constructed predominantly of limestone quarried nearby, and was one of the first buildings in the United States to use iron as a structural element. One of 11 state capitols that does not have a dome, it was the tallest building in the Southeastern United States when completed. It was listed on the National Register of Historic Places in 1970 and named a National Historic Landmark in 1971.

The basement and the ground floor of the Tennessee State Capitol are primarily office space; the original Tennessee Supreme Court chamber was on the ground floor. The second (principal) floor contains the house and senate chambers and a room that originally housed the Tennessee State Library and Archives. The tower consists of a pedestal topped by a circular cupola modeled on the Choragic Monument of Lysicrates. During the American Civil War, the building served as a camp for Union troops, a hospital, and a lookout. The capitol grounds were landscaped from 1871 to 1877. The building was extensively restored in the 1950s, when much of the exterior limestone was replaced with Indiana limestone. Additional interior renovations restored parts of the building to its mid-19th-century appearance.

The Tennessee State Capitol is located atop a prominent hill on the highest point in downtown Nashville. It is adorned by numerous monuments, memorials, and pieces of artwork, and the surrounding grounds are extensively landscaped with green spaces and a terraced east garden. Strickland, who died before the capitol was completed; and Samuel Morgan, who oversaw the commission that supervised construction; are entombed within the building's walls. The tombs of James K. Polk, the 11th President of the United States, and his wife Sarah Childress Polk are on the grounds. The Tennessee Supreme Court Building (Note: In addition to Nashville, the Tennessee Supreme Court also meets in Knoxville and Jackson. The Constitution of Tennessee requires the supreme court to rotate meetings between the state's three Grand Divisions.) and original state library building are adjacent to the west side of the building, and additional state office buildings surround the capitol on the east, south, and west. Bicentennial Capitol Mall State Park, considered an extension of the grounds, is directly north of the building.

== Description ==
The Tennessee State Capitol is overseen by the State Capitol Commission, which governs maintenance policies and historical preservation, and approves modifications. This agency is under the jurisdiction of the Office of the State Architect, and consists of seven members appointed by the governor and speakers of the house and senate; and seven ex officio members from the governor's cabinet. The State of Tennessee Real Estate Asset Management division of the Tennessee Department of General Services handles regular maintenance and upkeep.

=== Location and grounds ===
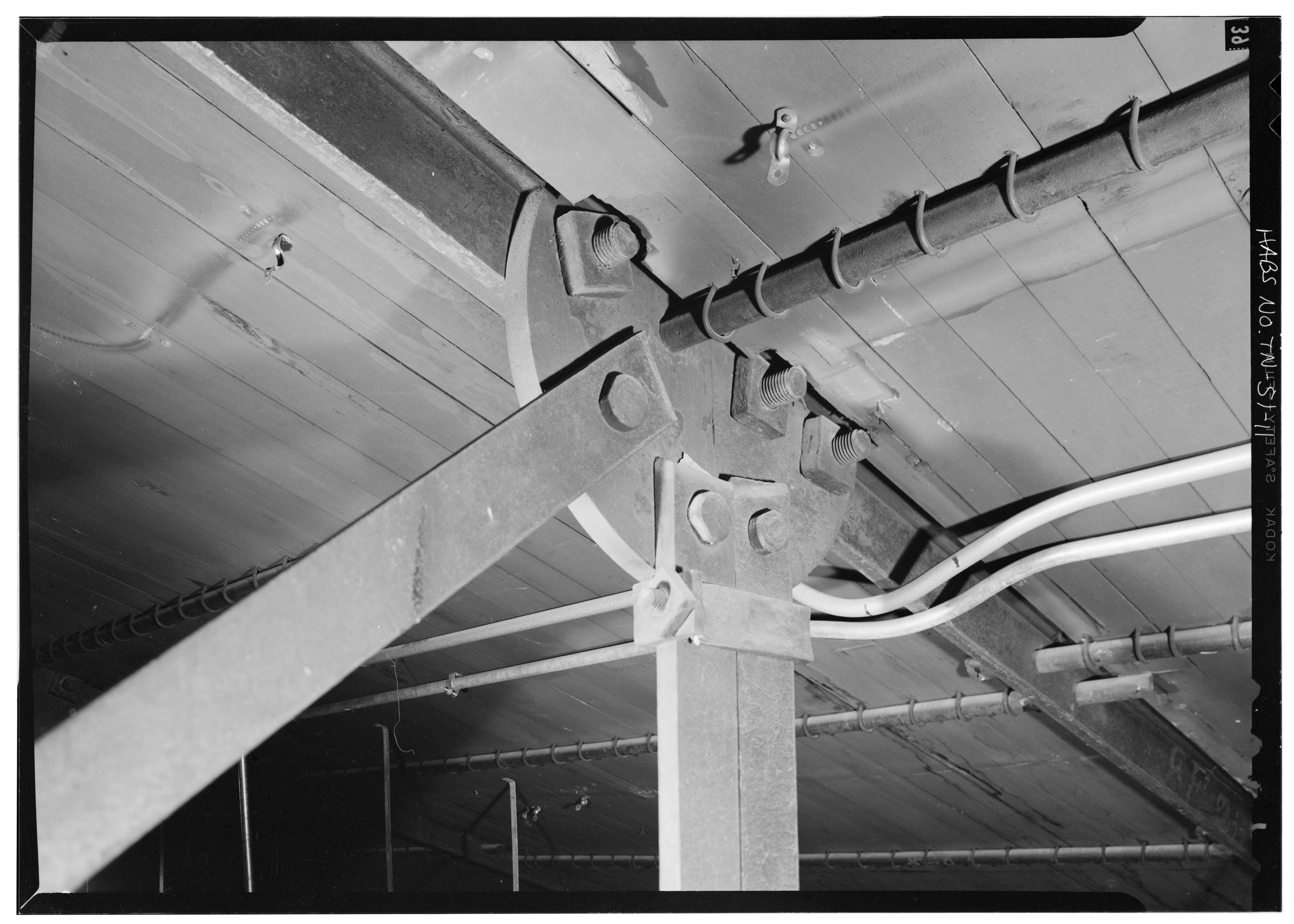
Closeup of one of the wrought iron trusses supporting the roof in 1970. The capitol was one of the first buildings in the United States to use structural iron.

The Tennessee State Capitol is one of the oldest working statehouses in the United States, having been used continuously by the Tennessee General Assembly since 1853. It sits atop Capitol Hill, the highest point in Downtown Nashville. This hill rises approximately 200 feet (61 m) above the nearby Cumberland River. In 1854, capitol porter George Dardis compared the structure's placement to that of the ancient city of Rome on seven hills, the Acropolis of Athens, and Capo Colonna. The grounds are bounded by Dr. Martin Luther King Jr. Boulevard to the south; a horseshoe-shaped road that is part of 6th Avenue on the east and Lamar Alexander Way on the west envelops the rest of the grounds. The Tennessee Supreme Court building for the Middle Tennessee division and old state library building are located on the west side of the grounds. Another road that is part of 7th Avenue runs between the building's west side and the court and archives buildings, and loops around the north side to connect to parking encircling the building. The capitol complex is surrounded on the west, south, and east by several state office buildings. Directly south of the capitol is Legislative Plaza, a public plaza. The Nashville District Energy System provides heating and cooling to the capitol and other nearby buildings.

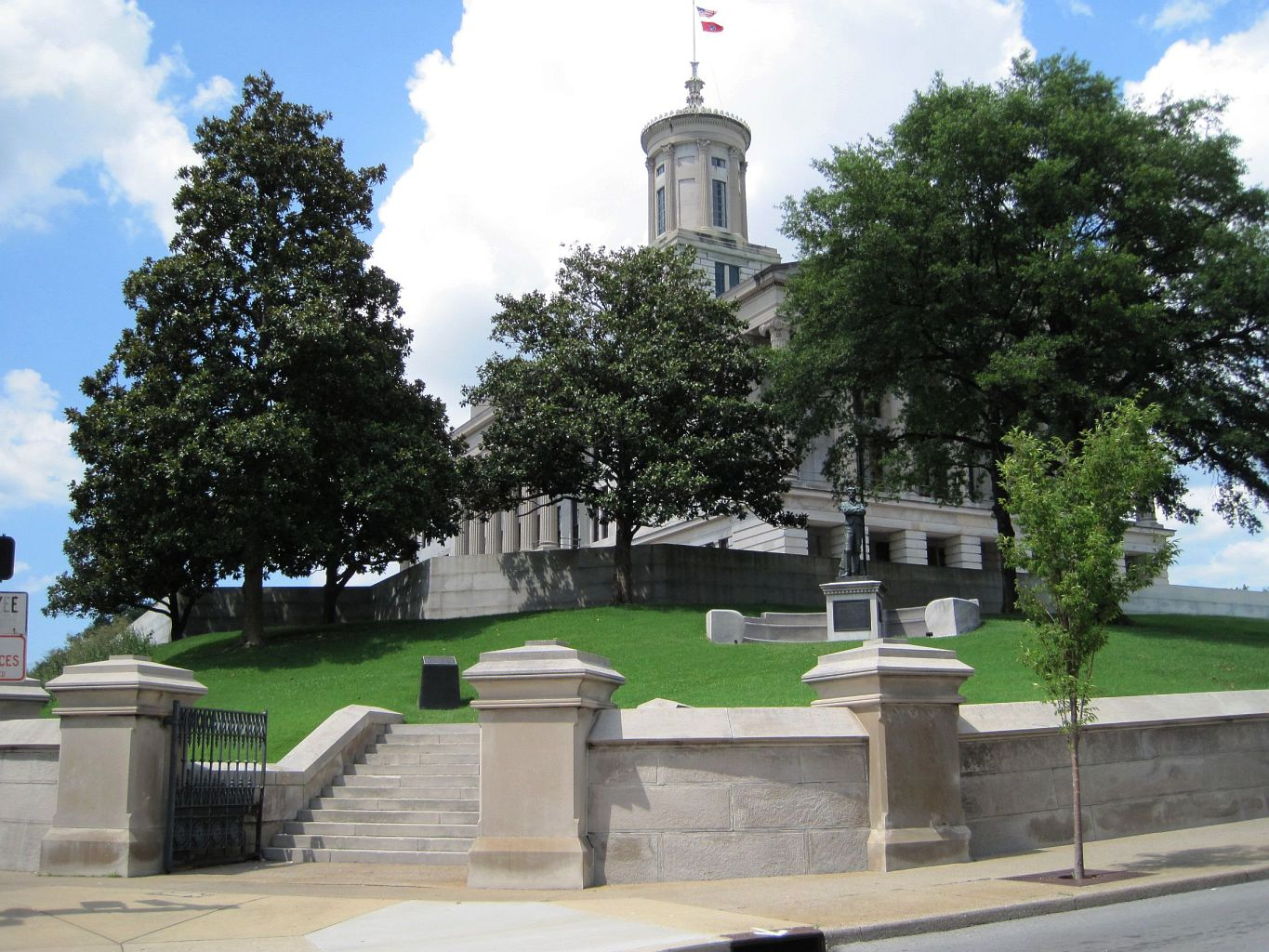
The capitol grounds are a landscaped green space.

The capitol grounds are an extensively landscaped green space with cedar, magnolia, maple, and hickory trees. Next to each of the building's corners is a circular bed with herbaceous flowers arranged in the tri-star emblem of the Tennessee Flag. (Note: These stars represent the three Grand Divisions of Tennessee) North of the capitol is a steep grassy slope that is bisected by the loop road. The Belvedere, an overlook, is situated approximately midway down this slope and provides views to the north. James Robertson Parkway separates the north grounds from Bicentennial Capitol Mall State Park, a large public park that traces the state's history and geographic features. This park is considered an extension of the grounds. The east garden, also called the Jackson Garden, consists of a terraced slope that includes a rectangular plaza with circular fountains on each end. A wide staircase connects this plaza to 6th Avenue, which is accessed by another wide staircase to the capitol's east entrance, considered the main entrance. The Motlow Tunnel connects Charlotte Avenue to the capitol's basement and elevators. The tunnel entrance is surrounded by two narrow staircases, which broaden into a single wider staircase above the tunnel that ascends to the north entrance. Other smaller staircases are on the northeast, southeast, and southwest corners of the grounds. The capitol building is decoratively illuminated at night, and is frequently lit with colors chosen to match seasonal events, holidays, and special events. Guided tours of the building and grounds are provided by Tennessee State Museum staff.

=== Structure and architecture ===
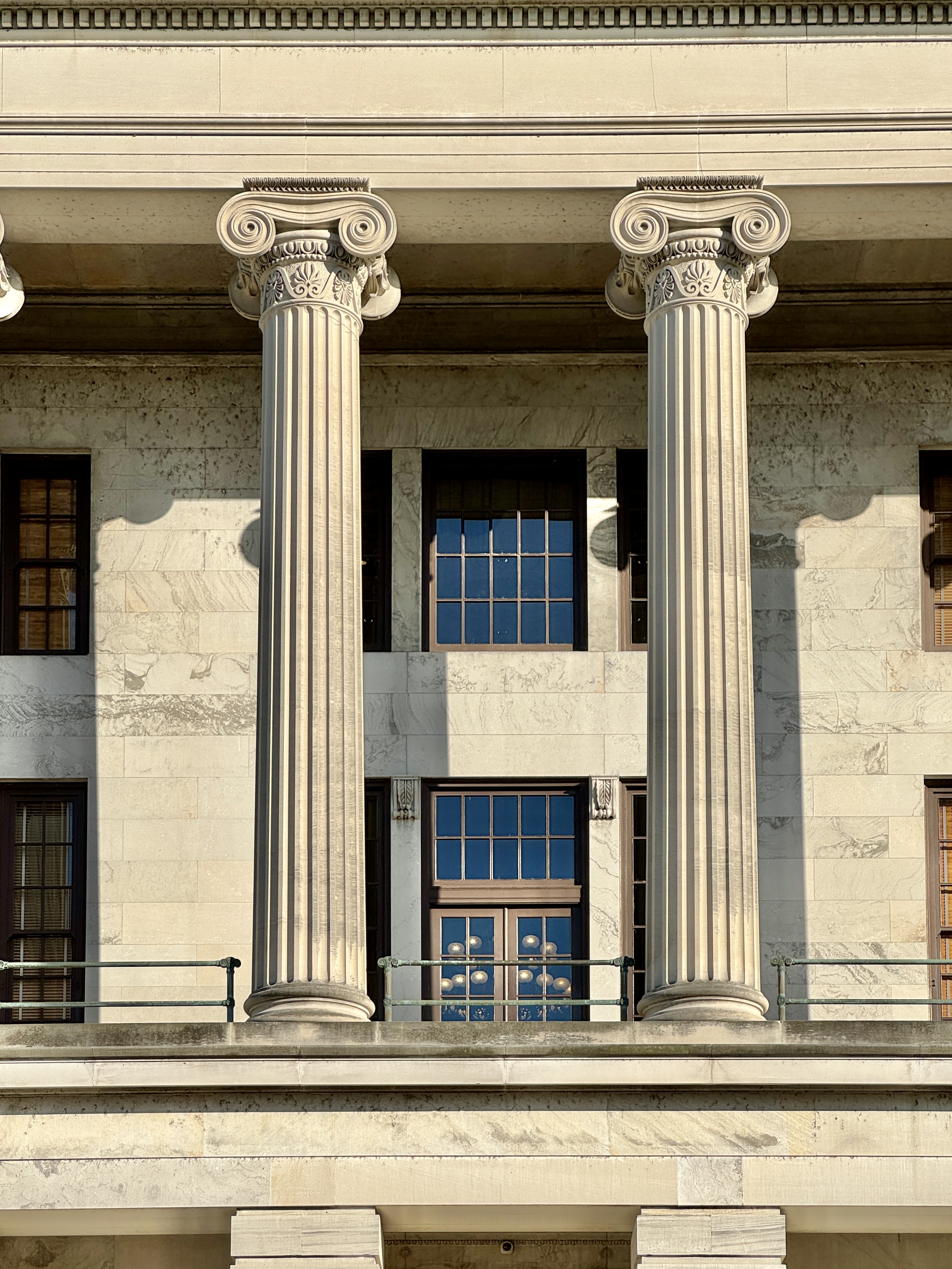
A closeup view of one of the porticoes. The capitol building incorporates Greek Revival architecture.

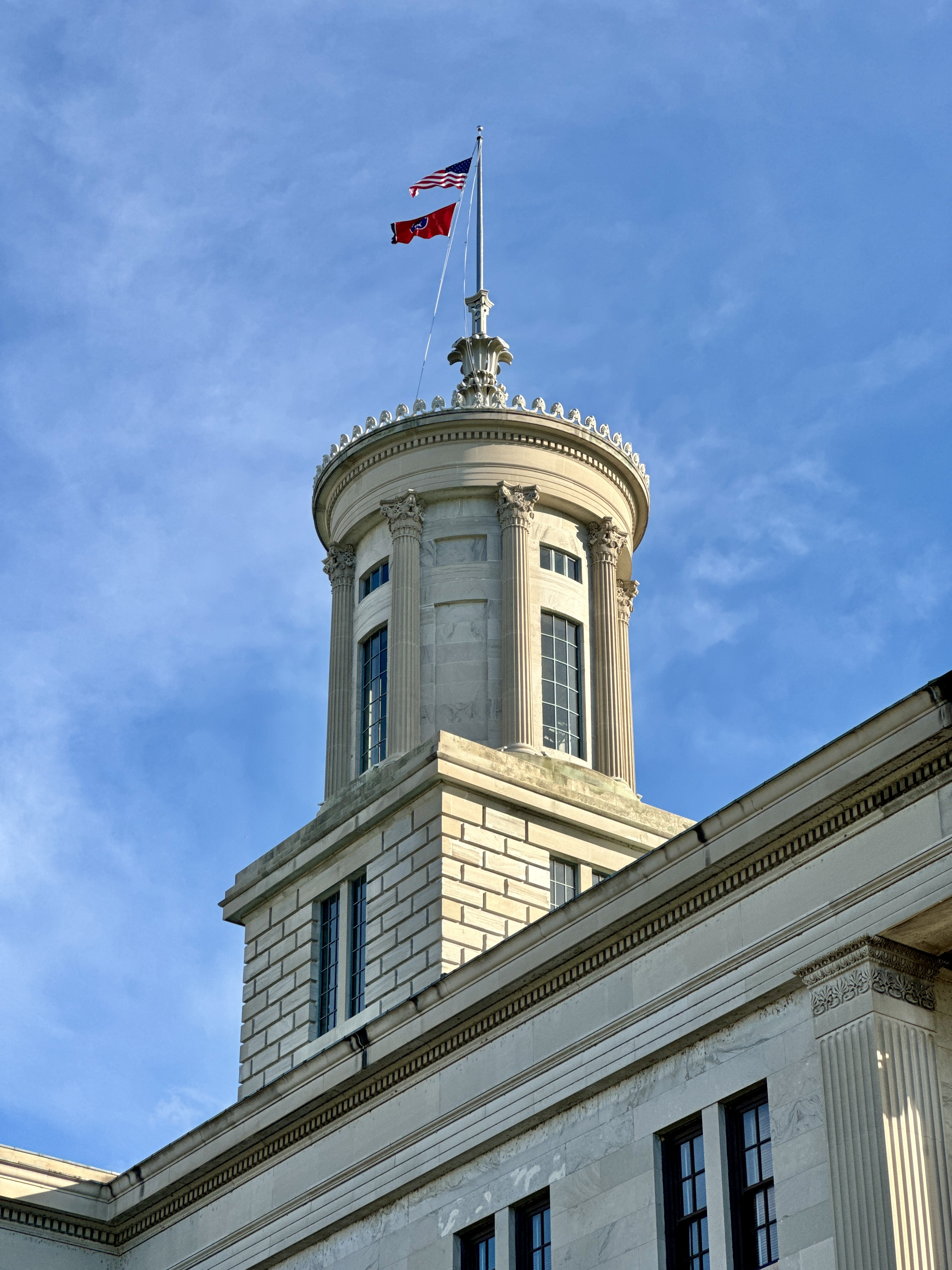
The cupola is modeled on the Choragic Monument of Lysicrates in Athens.

The Tennessee State Capitol is modeled after an Ionic temple, incorporating Greek Revival architecture. It is one of 11 state capitol buildings without a dome. The building measures 112 by 239 feet (34 by 73 m), (Note: Another source gives dimensions of 109 by 238 feet (33 by 73 m)) and is approximately 206.6 feet (63.0 m) tall. It is composed of fossiliferous limestone quarried from nearby, (Note: Officially, the original blocks are made of Bigby Limestone or Bigby-Cannon Limestone, a type of fossiliferous limestone found only in Middle Tennessee.) and replacement oolitic Indiana limestone. Each stone block weighs between 6 and 10 short tons (5.4 and 9.1 metric tons). The load-bearing walls are solid limestone, with the floors supported by brick vaults. The north and south porticoes each contain eight Ionic columns; the east and west porticoes, which do not span the structure's entire length, contain six. Each columns measure 56 inches (1.4 m) in diameter, and are capped by entablatures consisting of an architrave, frieze, and cornice. Pediments are situated atop the entablatures at the north and south ends of the building, and parapets are atop the side porticoes. The porticoes are based on the Erechtheion in Athens, and are on the second floor atop a Doric basement. They emphasize the building's entrances on all four sides, and are supported by first-floor six-foot-wide (1.8 m) square columns.

The trusses supporting the roof are made of wrought iron rafters, and span the building's entire width. Their connections are made of cast iron. The roof is made of copper. The attic underneath reaches 14 feet (4.3 m) in height, and is used for storage. On the roof is a 37-foot-tall (11 m) lantern-like round tower, or cupola, modeled after the Choragic Monument of Lysicrates, that sits on a 42-foot-tall (13 m) square pedestal-like structure. The tower weighs 4,000 short tons (3,600 metric tons). Nashville architect Kem Hinton notes an irony about the tower, as the Choragic Monument honors Lysicrates, an Ancient Greek choral leader. Tennessee later played a major role in developing popular music, with Nashville known internationally as "Music City". The cupola has eight Corinthian columns, surmounted by capitals of small lotus leaves and a single row of acanthus leaves above. A flower resembling the Egyptian lotus is between the acanthus leaves on each capital. The roof is crowned by a cast iron 37-foot-tall (11 m) finial composed of four tiers of leaves and a spire on top. Four cast iron ornamental scrolls are between the cupola roof and lower leaf tier. The American flag and Tennessee flag are permanently flown here, with the flag of the Tennessee General Assembly displayed when the legislature is in session. These flags measure 5 by 8 feet (1.5 by 2.4 m). The cupola's roof decorations were designed by Strickland's son Francis after his father's death.

=== Interior and layout ===
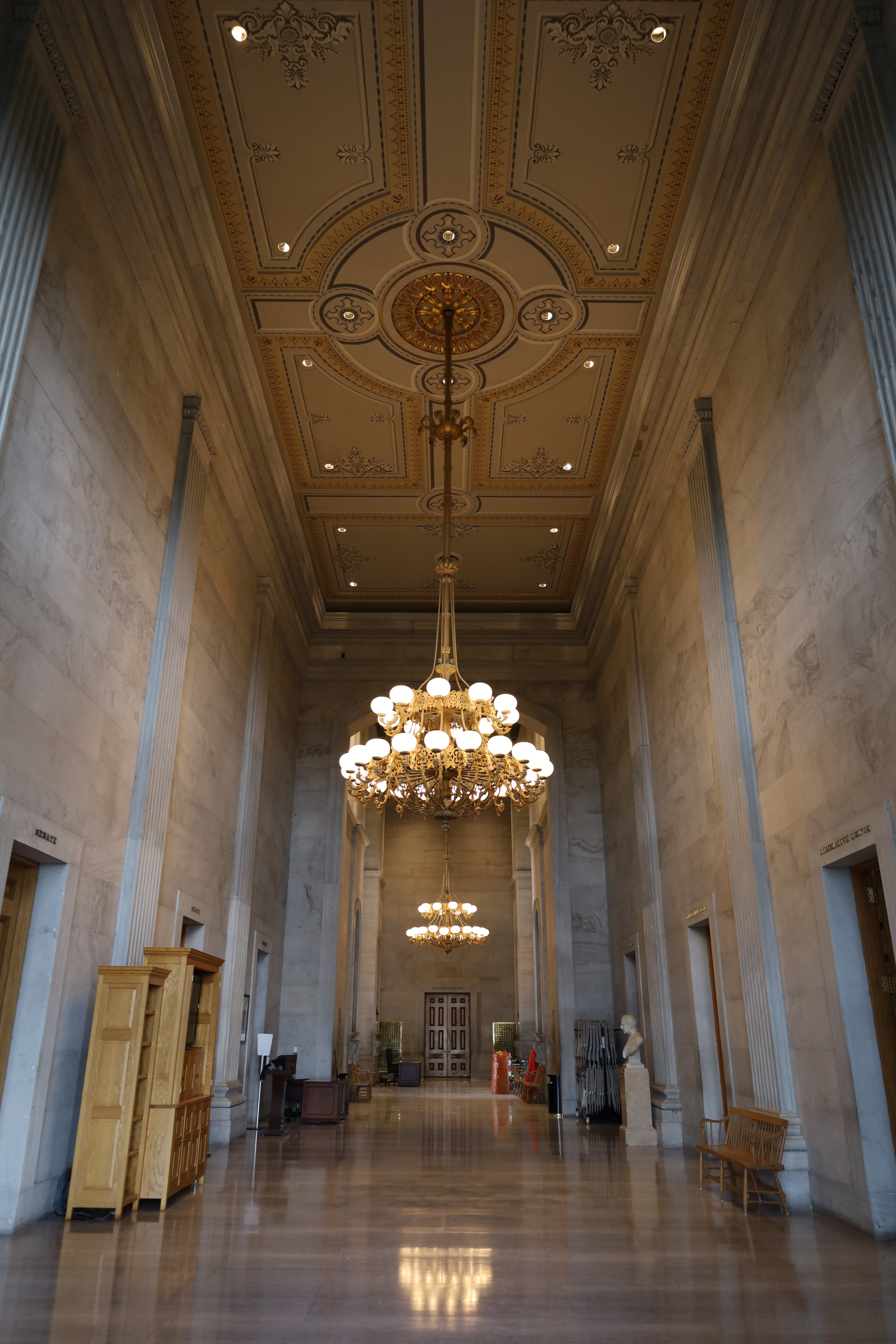
The central hallway on the main floor.

The basement of the capitol building was originally an unfinished crypt with the state armory and fuel storage. It was later excavated into offices for gubernatorial staff and other state officials. The ground floor, sometimes called the executive floor, (Note: This level was sometimes called the basement before the original crypt and present-day basement floor was excavated.) is crisscrossed by halls and contains the governor's office, the original supreme court chamber, and offices of cabinet members and other officials. It originally contained space for the state archives and a federal courtroom. The ceiling is approximately 18 feet (5.5 m) tall. The 30-foot-wide (9.1 m) principal stairway leads from the first floor to the second and principal level on the building's west side. It is surrounded by reddish-brown marble handrails and balustrades. A chip in a handrail was reportedly caused by a gunshot during debate over the 14th Amendment in 1866. Each step is carved out of a single block of mottled limestone with a curved underside. The bottom half of the staircase is 10 feet (3.0 m) wide, and leads to a landing situated against the west wall. This consists of three limestone slabs supported by Doric columns. The second part of the staircase has double stairwells that bridge the landing to the second floor. These are cantilevered into the north and south-side walls of the stairwell, and are sided with cast iron facing.

The house of representatives chamber, known as the Hall of Representatives in its early years, encompasses the entire building's south end on the second floor, which is also called the legislative floor. This two-story room is 74 by 100 feet (23 by 30 m) wide, 40 feet (12 m) tall, and is flanked by third-floor spectator galleries on the east and west side. These are accessible from staircases connecting to the second-floor hallway with original iron handrailings, and are atop eight smaller offices that originally served as committee meeting rooms. Both galleries are fronted by eight fluted Ionic columns that measure 32 inches (0.81 m) in diameter, each carved of a single limestone block. These represent Tennessee's status as the 16th state admitted to the Union. They are topped by elaborate capitals designed in Composite order, and on each side of the chamber, support entablatures that are more than seven feet (2.1 m) thick. A wallscreen of Tennessee marble with carvings of fasces, original to the building, is in the chamber's front behind the speaker's podium.

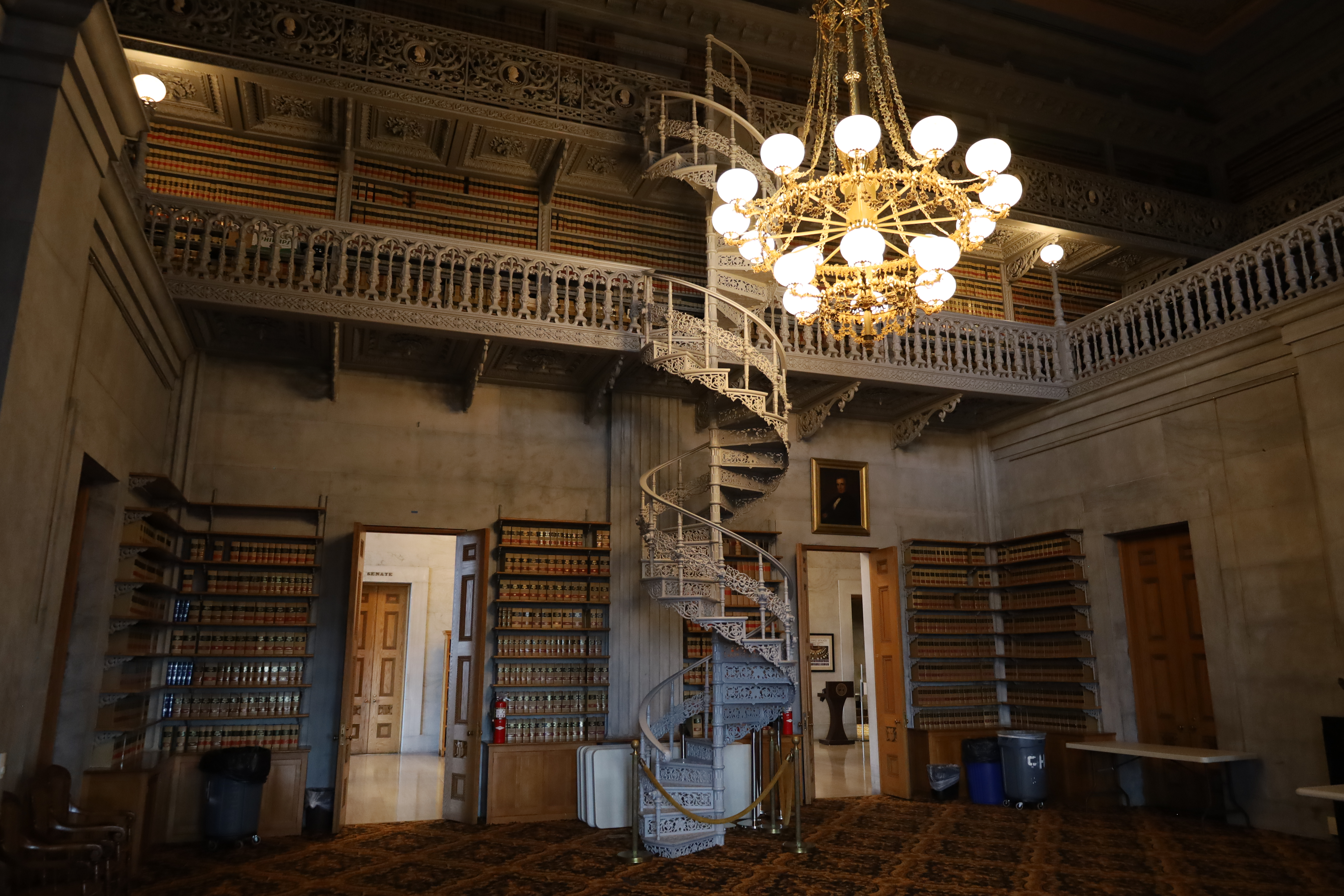
The old state library room. This room was completed after Strickland's death, and features Victorian architectural elements.

The senate chamber is on the second floor's northeast corner. It measures 35 by 70 feet (11 by 21 m) wide, and its ceiling is 43 feet (13 m) tall. A 12-foot-wide (3.7 m) spectator balcony with original ironwork surrounds the east, south, and west side of the chamber, and is supported by a colonnade of 12 Tennessee marble Ionic columns. The ceiling design is of a lacunaria, radiating outward from the front of the chamber directly above the front platform. A full entablature surrounds the entire room, and Ionic pilasters are in the walls. On the northwest corner, opposite the senate chamber, is the old state library room. This measures 35 by 35 feet (11 by 11 m) wide, and is flanked on the north and south sides by smaller rooms that were originally used by senate committees. This room was designed by English-born Nashville architect H. M. Akeroyd after Strickland's death. Modeled on the library of Scottish novelist Walter Scott, it features Victorian architecture in contrast to the rest of the building. A wrought iron spiral staircase connects the east side of the room to third and fourth-floor balconies, which extend atop the rooms. The balconies have elaborate wrought iron handrailings and undersides. This room originally housed the library's content on all three floors, and still contains many books. It is now primarily used as a legislative lounge and meeting room.

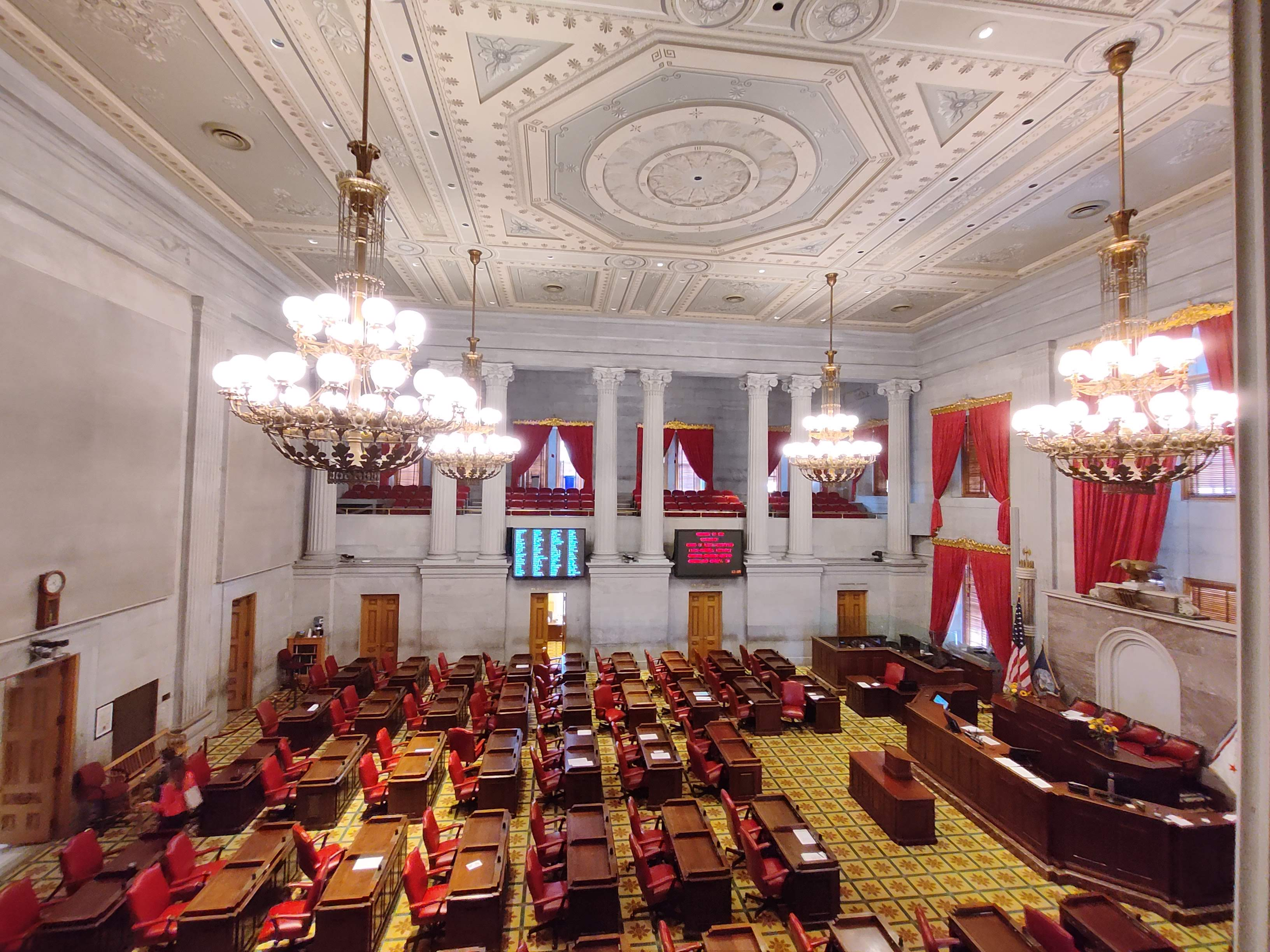
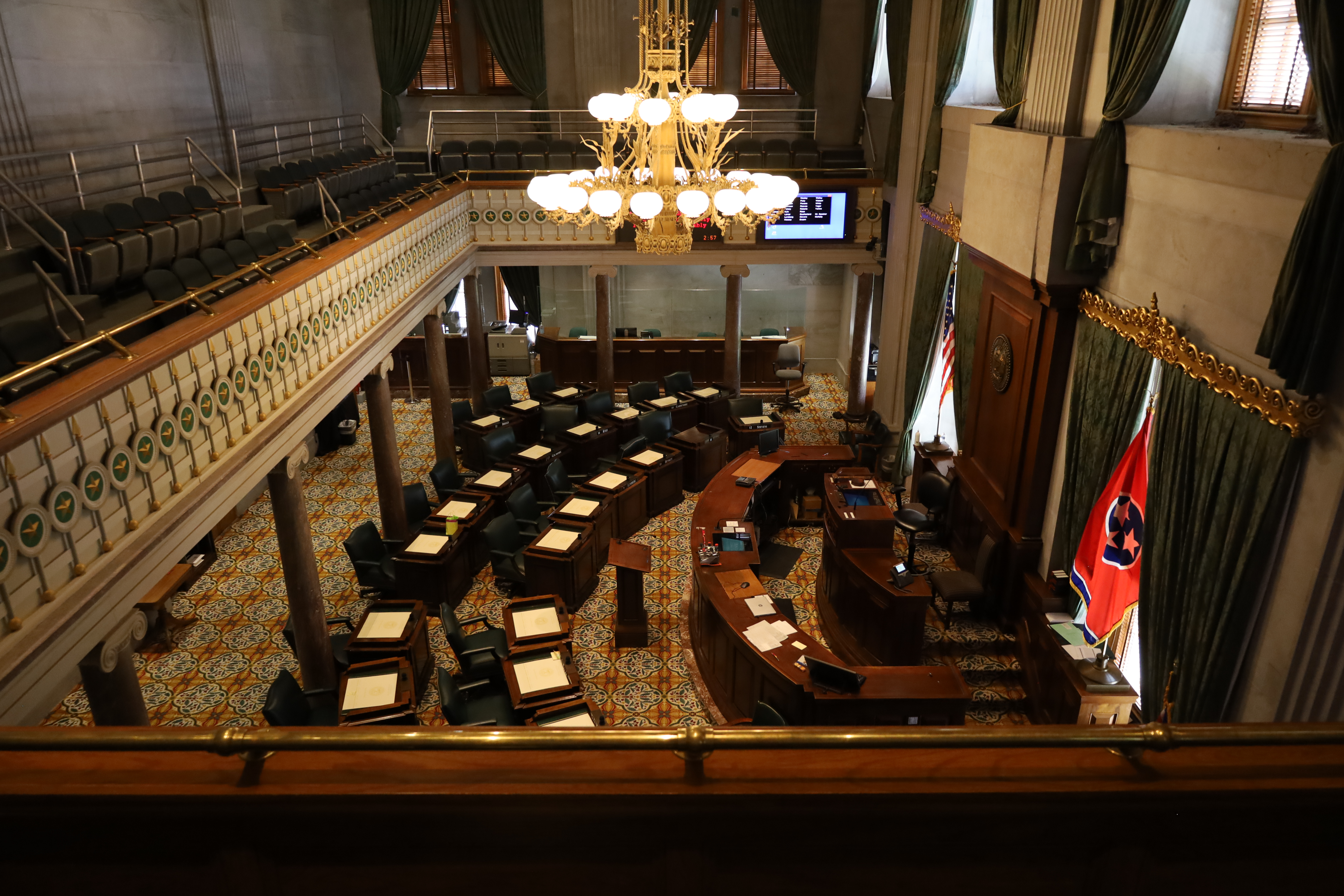
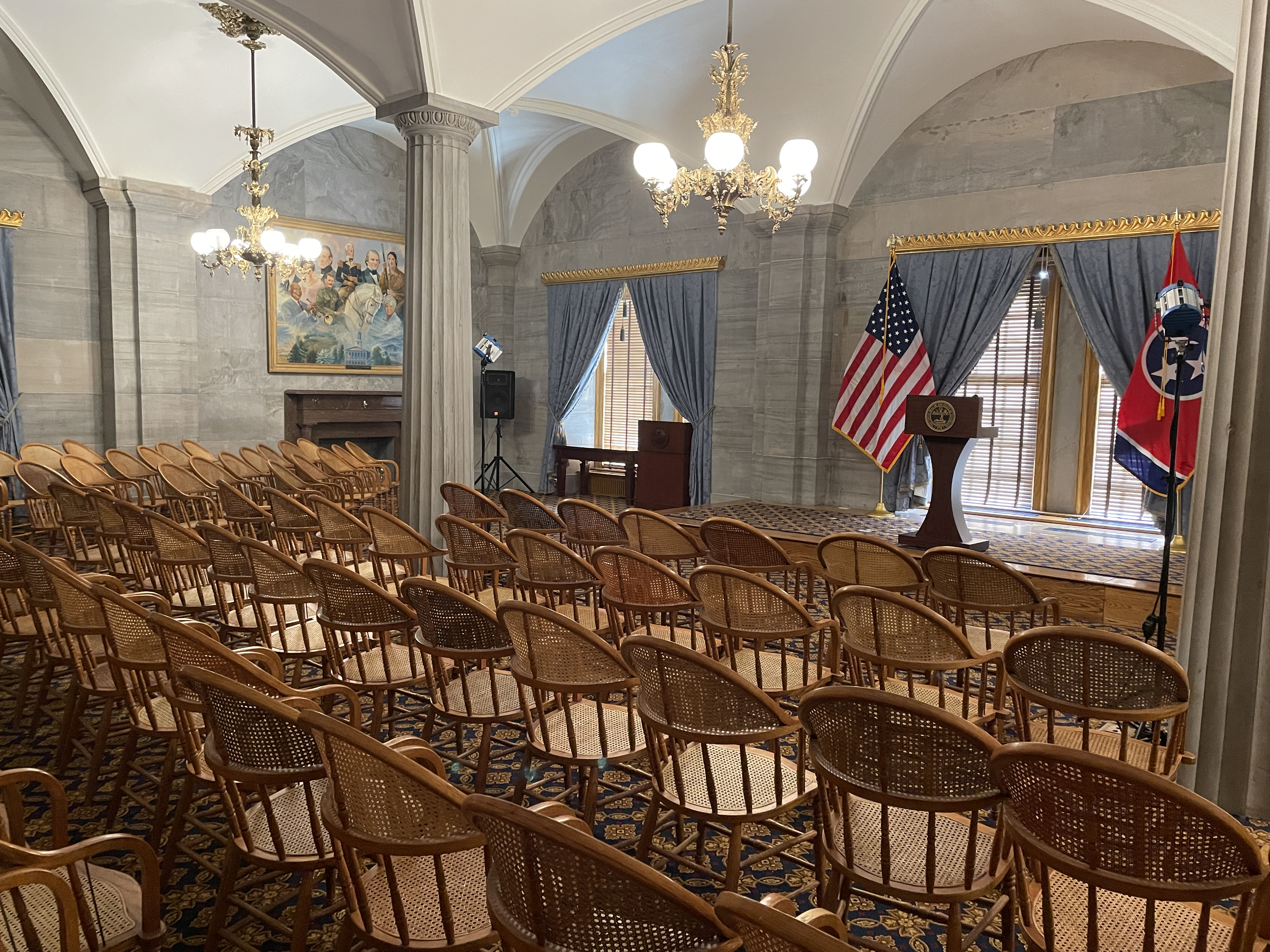
From left to right: House of Representatives chamber, Senate chamber, and old Supreme Court chamber.
From left to right: Historic American Buildings Survey schematics of the basement, first floor, second floor, and side of the Tennessee State Capitol.

== Monuments and memorials ==
=== Capitol grounds monuments ===
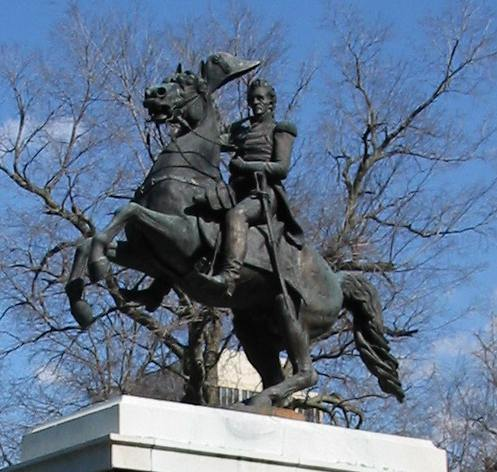
Equestrian statue of 7th President Andrew Jackson

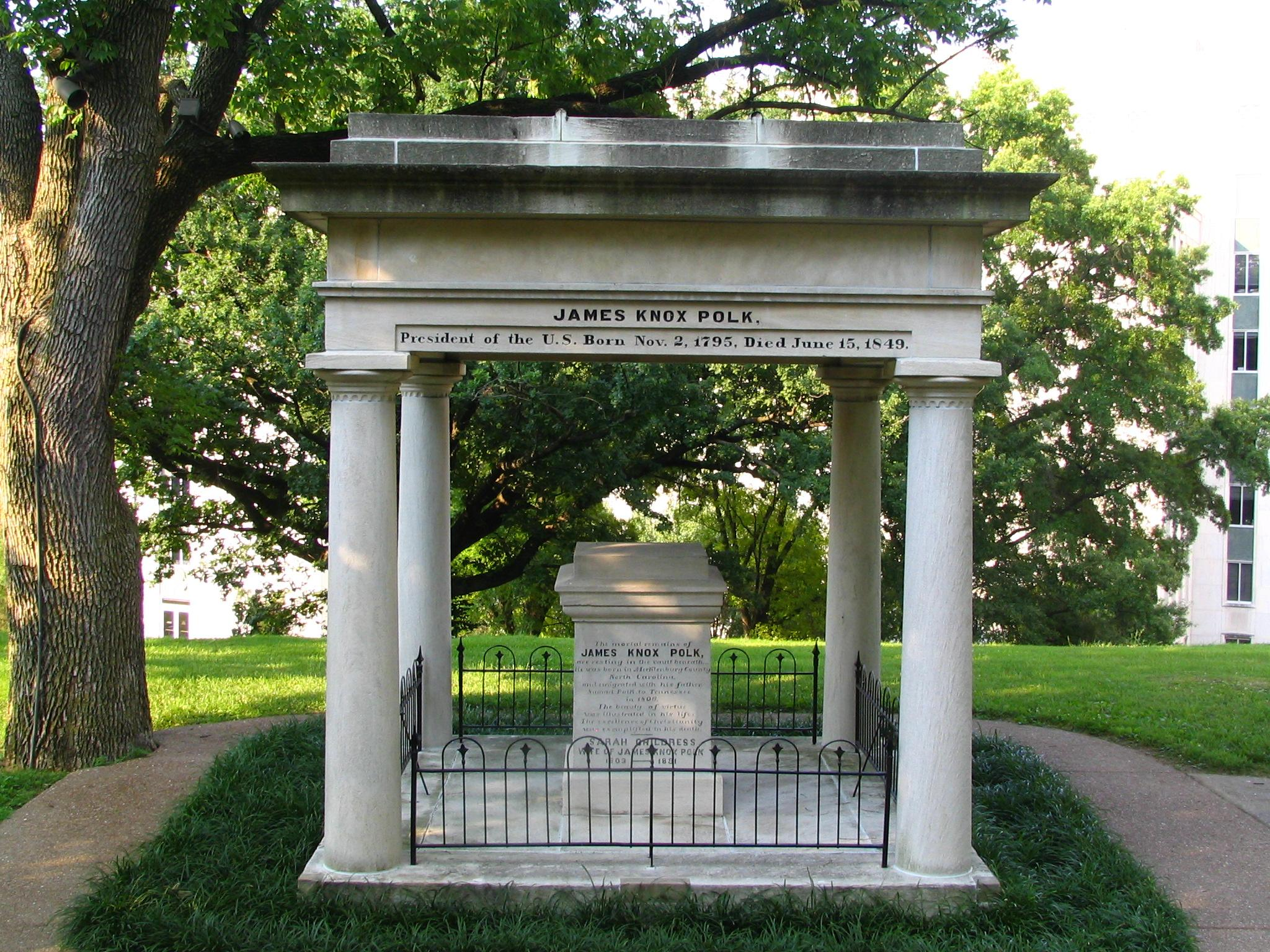
Tomb of 11th President James K. Polk and First Lady Sarah Childress Polk

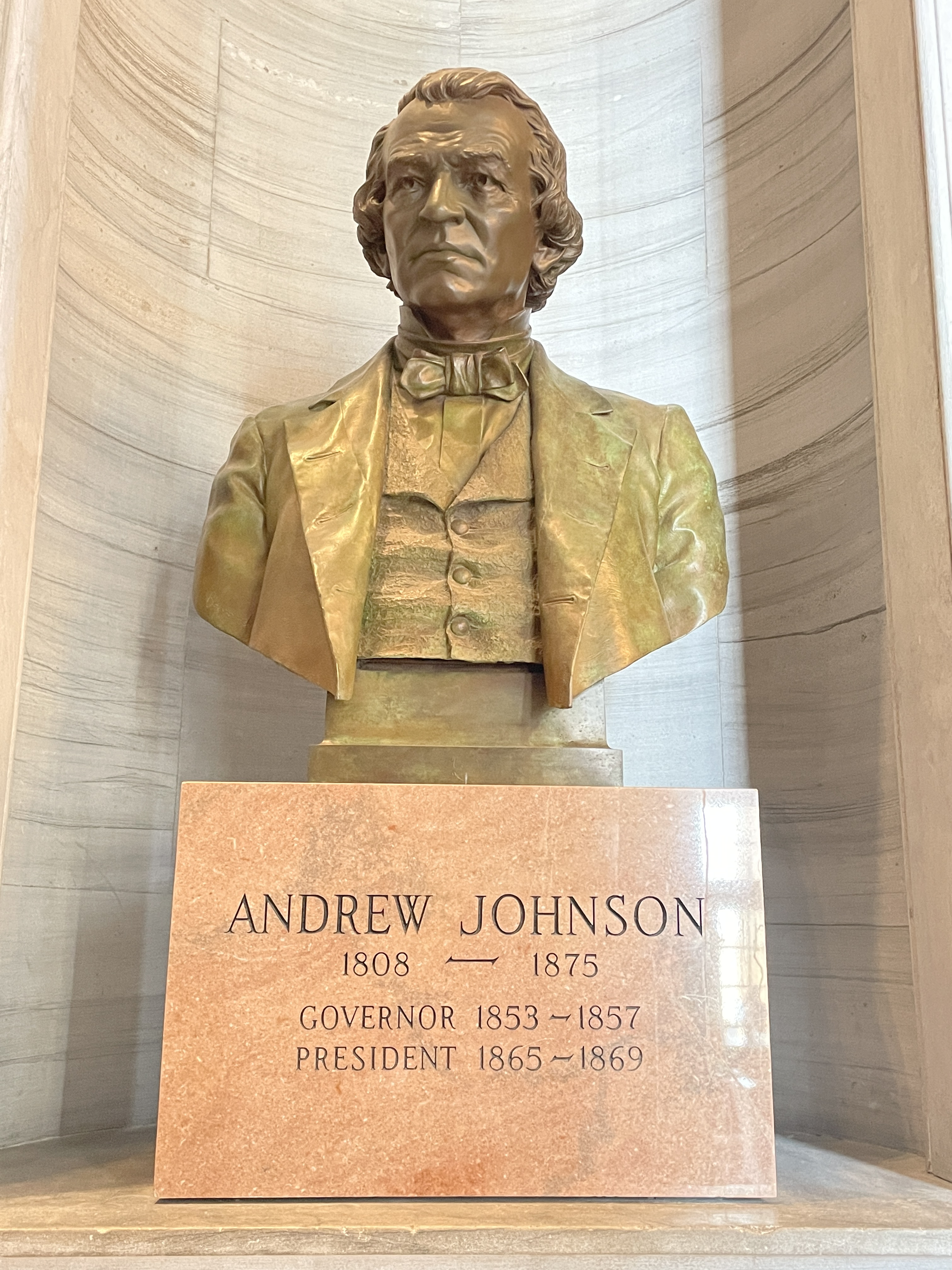
Bust of 17th President Andrew Johnson

The Tennessee State Capitol is extensively adorned with artwork, monuments, and memorials on the grounds and interior. Capitol architect William Strickland and capitol commission chairman Samuel Morgan are entombed in the building's exterior walls on the ground level. Statues of two of the three Tennesseans who served as President of the United States are on the grounds. Andrew Jackson is represented by an equestrian statue, sculpted by Clark Mills on the east plaza between the fountains. The second Tennessee president, James K. Polk, is buried in a tomb on the northeast grounds with his wife, Sarah Childress Polk. Their remains were reinterred here in 1893 from their Polk Place home in Nashville. President Andrew Johnson is represented with a statue by sculptor Jim Gray. A statue of Confederate soldier Sam Davis called Boy Hero of the Confederacy was sculpted by George Julian Zolnay, and is on the southwest grounds.

Sgt. Alvin C. York is represented by a statue by Felix de Weldon on the grounds' southeast corner. The Charles Warterfield Reliquary is a group of broken limestone columns and fragments removed from the capitol during the 1950s restoration, situated near the northern belvedere on Capitol Drive. The Answer Bell, housed in a tower near the northwest corner of the building, complements a carillon at Bicentennial Mall. The bell chimes at the top of each hour in response to the carillon, representing the state government's commitment to the people.

One of many trees on the grounds is a tulip poplar, Tennessee's state tree, in memory of Martin Luther King Jr. The Tennessee Holocaust Memorial on the southeast corner consists of a stone marker and six native Tennessee cedars that memorialize the six million Jews murdered in the Holocaust. A memorial to Africans in the Middle Passage is on the southwest grounds' corner. A monument to unborn children, including those lost to abortion, is on the southeastern grounds.

=== Interior artwork and monuments ===
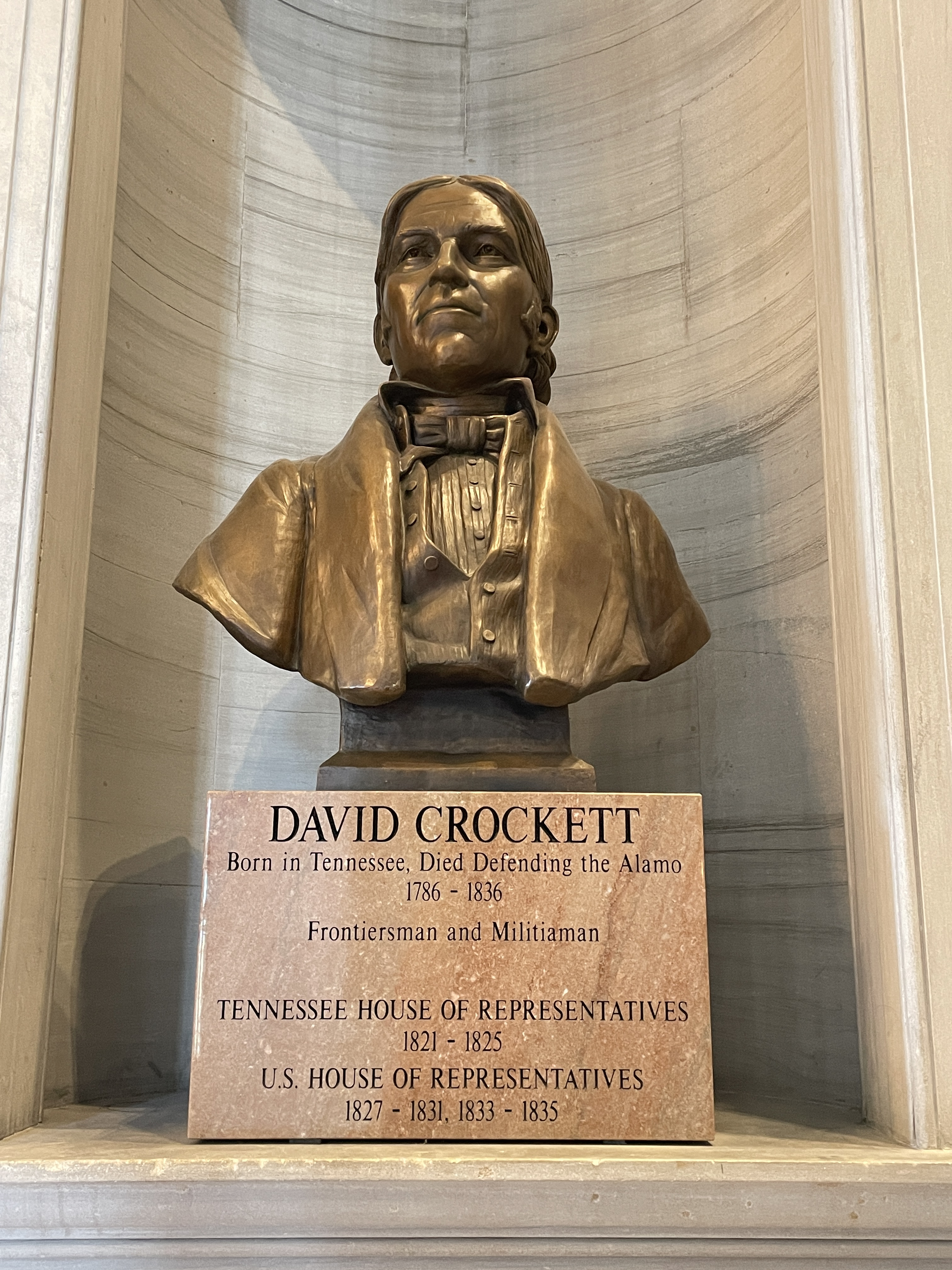
Bust of frontiersman Davy Crockett by Antonio Tobias Mendez. Statues, busts, and portraits of prominent Tennesseans are displayed throughout the interior.

The hallways and chambers are lit by elaborate brass chandeliers. Four are original gasoliers from 1855 to 1857, and the others are replicas of the originals. The library ceiling is adorned with portraits of eight prominent people, and the first-floor hallway's ceiling has frescoes depicting state symbols and historical events. German-born artists Theodore Knoch and John Schleicher painted these in 1858 and 1859. The governor's reception room features 11 realist-style murals depicting major events from early Tennessee history, painted by Armenian American artist Jirayr Zorthian. The first floor has portraits of the three Tennessee presidents and several Tennessee governors.

Busts of Polk and Jackson in the main hall were started by Belle Kinney Scholz and completed by Gifford Proctor. Nearby is a second Jackson bust by Puryear Mims. Other busts in the main hall include Andrew Johnson, George Washington, first Tennessee governor John Sevier, first Black Tennessee legislator Sampson W. Keeble, frontiersman Davy Crockett, and Tennessee Secretary of State Joe C. Carr. Busts by Mary Hooper Donelson of Governors Robert Love Taylor and Alfred A. Taylor, who were brothers, are in the basement. The library chamber has busts of U.S. Secretary of State Cordell Hull by Bryant Baker, and Cherokee neographer Sequoyah by Griffin Chiles. Other portraits include Union rear admiral Samuel P. Carter and World War I rear admiral Charles St. John Butler, both by Eleanor McAdoo Wiley.

Two bas-reliefs depicting Tennessee's role in passing the 19th Amendment and Reconstruction Amendments adorn opposite walls of the house chamber. The first, by Alan LeQuire, is based off a photograph of women's suffragists in Knoxville. The second, by Jin Huang Powell, depicts African American men voting in Nashville after the passage of the 14th and 15th Amendments.

=== Artwork controversies ===
After the Civil War, many Confederate sympathizers objected to artwork in the capitol honoring Union leaders. Portraits of Reconstruction era governor Parson Brownlow and Union General George Henry Thomas by George Dury were installed in the house chamber shortly after the war, and moved to the library in 1870. Many legislators were so offended by the Brownlow portrait that they would frequently spit on it, requiring the artist to retouch it. In 1905, the house passed a resolution to give the Thomas portrait to Union veteran and Tennessee Historical Society vice president Gates P. Thruston, but this failed in the senate. The portrait was eventually removed and placed in storage, but it is unknown when this occurred. The Brownlow portrait returned to the library room in April 1987 during the room's restoration. This immediately drew fire from several legislators, including state senator and Sons of Confederate Veterans member Douglas Henry, who objected because Brownlow disenfranchised Confederates. Henry later iterated he was not against its presence in the capitol, but did not want it displayed in "a place of prominence". The capitol restoration commission voted to move it a few weeks later, despite opposition from East Tennessee legislators. This was also criticized as racist and sympathetic to the Confederate cause. The portrait was removed on May 27, 1987, along with portraits of several governors as part of the renovation, and installed in the state museum shortly thereafter.

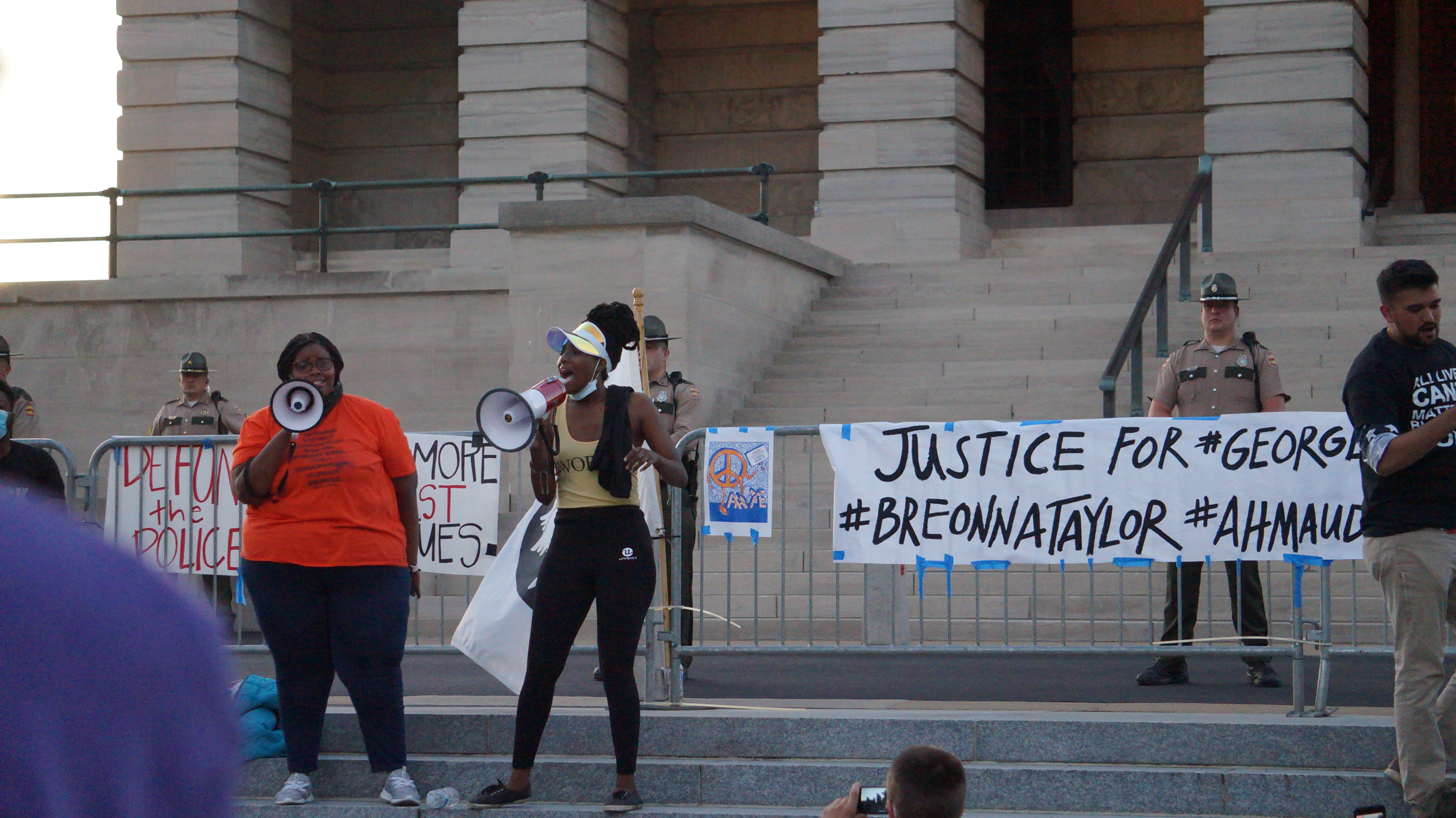
A demonstration against the murder of George Floyd on the capitol steps in 2020. This event renewed debate over Confederate monuments at the captiol, leading to removal of the Nathan Bedford Forrest Bust the following year.

The Edward W. Carmack statue by Nancy Cox-McCormack was unveiled on June 6, 1925, honoring a Tennessee journalist and U.S. Senator murdered nearby in 1908. It was controversial because of Carmack's racist views, particularly his calls for retaliation against civil rights advocate Ida B. Wells. Calls for permanent removal occurred during its temporary relocation for the Motlow Tunnel construction in the late 1950s. On May 30, 2020, the statue was toppled by protestors demonstrating against the police murder of George Floyd. They unofficially claimed the area as "Ida B. Wells Plaza" in an attempt to establish an autonomous zone modeled on Capitol Hill Autonomous Zone in Seattle. The statue was not reinstalled, and replaced with a statue of Davy Crockett in 2026.

A bust of slave trader, Confederate general, and Ku Klux Klan leader Nathan Bedford Forrest was sculpted by Loura Jane Herndon Baxendale and dedicated in the main hall on November 5, 1978. It was commissioned by Henry, who wanted a memorial to the Confederate counterpart to Admiral David Farragut, who he considered the most influential Union officer from Tennessee. It was controversial from its inception, facing protests the day of its dedication. A movement to relocate the bust gained momentum after the Charleston church shooting and Unite the Right rally. After Governor Bill Lee called for removal following the social unrest of 2020, the Tennessee Historical Commission voted on March 9, 2021, to relocate it to the state museum, along with busts of Farragut and Admiral Albert Gleaves. They were removed on July 23, 2021, and installed in the museum three days later.

The Middle Passage monument received criticism for historical inaccuracies shortly after its installation. The unborn children memorial drew controversy from abortion rights advocates before its installation, and faced protests during its dedication. Critics argue it stigmatizes women and takes a stance on the abortion debate. It was also lambasted as a distraction from more pressing issues.

== History ==
=== Background and planning ===
Lick Branch, later known as French Lick Creek, was a stream that flowed through the bottomlands immediately north of the capitol building site. It contained numerous salt licks and springs along its banks. Herds of bison, deer, turkey, bears, and other game wildlife were attracted to this stream, and Cherokee, Chickasaw, Shawnee, and other Native Americans used animal trails in the area. Due to constant territorial disputes, no single Native American group controlled the region when European settlers first arrived. French traders under Charles Charleville's command established a trading post along French Lick in 1714, which was the first European settlement in what is now Nashville. The creek and springs attracted settlers from East Tennessee in 1779, who established Fort Nashborough, the namesake of Nashville, along the Cumberland River, and founded the Cumberland Association the following year.

When Tennessee was admitted to the Union as the 16th state on June 1, 1796, Knoxville was its capital. Over the next 30 years, the seat of government alternated between Kingston, Nashville, Knoxville, and Murfreesboro, before moving to Nashville in 1826. No permanent statehouse was constructed during this time, and the legislature met in courthouses and other meeting places. The location debate was fierce, and the 1835 state constitution mandated the general assembly choose a permanent capital by 1843. On October 7, 1843, the legislature declared Nashville the permanent capital after a week of intense debates, and planning for a statehouse began shortly thereafter. The prominent hill the capitol sits on was known initially as Cedar Knob, and later Campbell's Hill after its owner Judge G. W. Campbell. In 1820, the first Roman Catholic Church in Tennessee was built on the lower part of the hill. This was succeeded by a brick structure in 1830, at which time the church was named Holy Rosary Cathedral. The city of Nashville purchased the property for $30,000 before the permanent capital was chosen, for donation to the state government. It was conveyed to the state for $1 on December 11, 1843. (Note: Equivalent to $35.00 in 2025)

=== Design and early construction ===
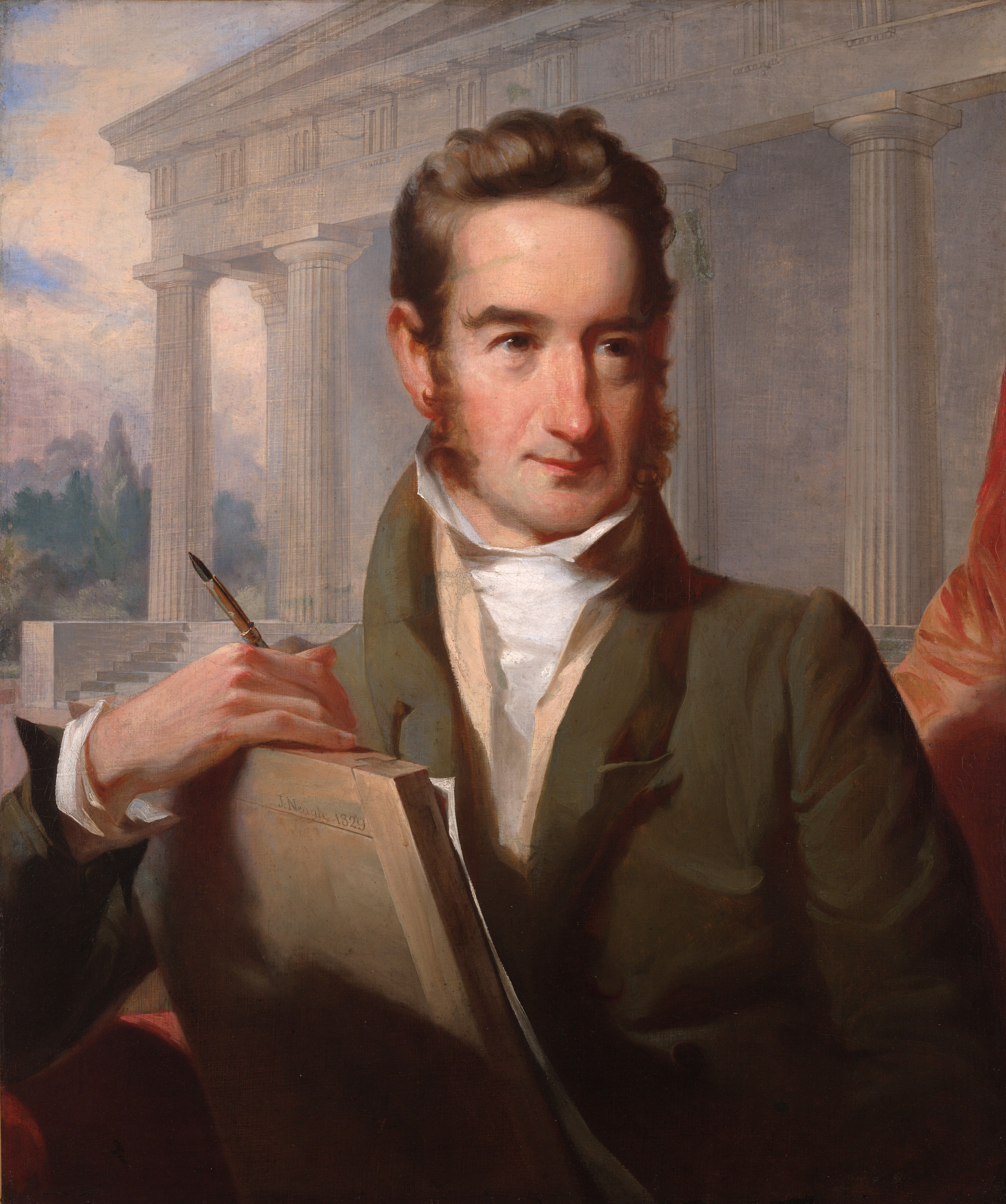
1829 portrait of William Strickland (1788–1854), the capitol's architect, by John Neagle.

On January 30, 1844, the Tennessee General Assembly established the Tennessee Capitol Commission to oversee the statehouse's design and construction, and appropriated an initial $10,000 for the project. (Note: Equivalent to $337,644 in 2025) This act also mandated using prisoner labor from the nearby penitentiary in Nashville to save money, and specified the structure be "built of smooth hewn or cut stone", with the ornamental portions made of Tennessee marble. The commission first met on February 12, 1844, and its first task was identifying an adequate quarry site. They immediately decided to search for a location near the capitol site, and on March 16, 1844, instructed the penitentiary keeper to examine sites near the prison. In January 1845, Samuel Watkins, who owned a quarry less than one mile (1.6 km) west of the site, agreed to a three-year lease for $1,500. (Note: Equivalent to $49,229 in 2025) The commissioners were not allowed to hold a design competition and chose to seek out qualified architects and engineers. They learned that renowned Philadelphia architect William Strickland was interested. On June 14 or 16, 1844, they discussed Strickland's offer to design and supervise construction for $2,500 per year. (Note: Equivalent to $84,411 in 2025) They also resolved to offer him $500 (Note: Equivalent to $16,882 in 2025) and the position of construction superintendent if his plan was adopted, and agreed to pay his travel expenses if he chose to visit Nashville. Other architects, including Gideon Shryock of Louisville, Kentucky, James H. Dakin of New Orleans, and local architect Adolphus Heiman also expressed interest. Strickland did not visit Nashville until April 29, 1845, when he began surveying the site. On May 20, 1845, Strickland was hired and his plans and report were adopted by the commission. (Note: Until 1951, the state incorrectly claimed that Strickland's original plan for the structure did not include a tower, and that he modified his plans to include this after it was requested by the Tennessee Capitol Commission.)

Strickland chose to model the capitol on Greco-Roman architecture, like his previous projects, and engineered the edifice almost entirely of limestone. He specified the roof trusses be made of wrought iron, recognizing its effectiveness as a fireproof structural member. Strickland may have wanted to take advantage of wrought iron's greater tensile strength. This was considered groundbreaking as one of the first uses of structural iron. Most structures in the United States at the time, including bridges, were still built with wooden structural elements. In his initial report, Strickland estimated that the project would cost $340,000, (Note: Equivalent to $11.2 million in 2025) or between $240,000 and $260,000 if constructed with convict labor. (Note: Equivalent to between $7.88 million and $8.53 million in 2025) Preliminary site preparation, which included clearing debris and blasting and digging for the foundation, began around January 1, 1845. Strickland prepared an estimate for "scalping" the rocky hill's brow to a depth of six feet (1.8 m) and excavating the crypt to a depth of seven feet (2.1 m), requiring removal of nearly 8,000 cubic yards (6,100 m^{3}) of dirt and rock. This was later revised to slightly over four feet (1.2 m) deep, and cost 36 cents per 1 cubic yard (0.76 m^{3}), (Note: Equivalent to $12.00 in 2025) for a total of $2,500. (Note: Equivalent to $82,048 in 2025) Excavation was largely completed by June 25, 1845. The cornerstone of the Tennessee State Capitol was laid in a ceremony on Independence Day, July 4, 1845, that began in the nearby city square, and proceeded to the site.

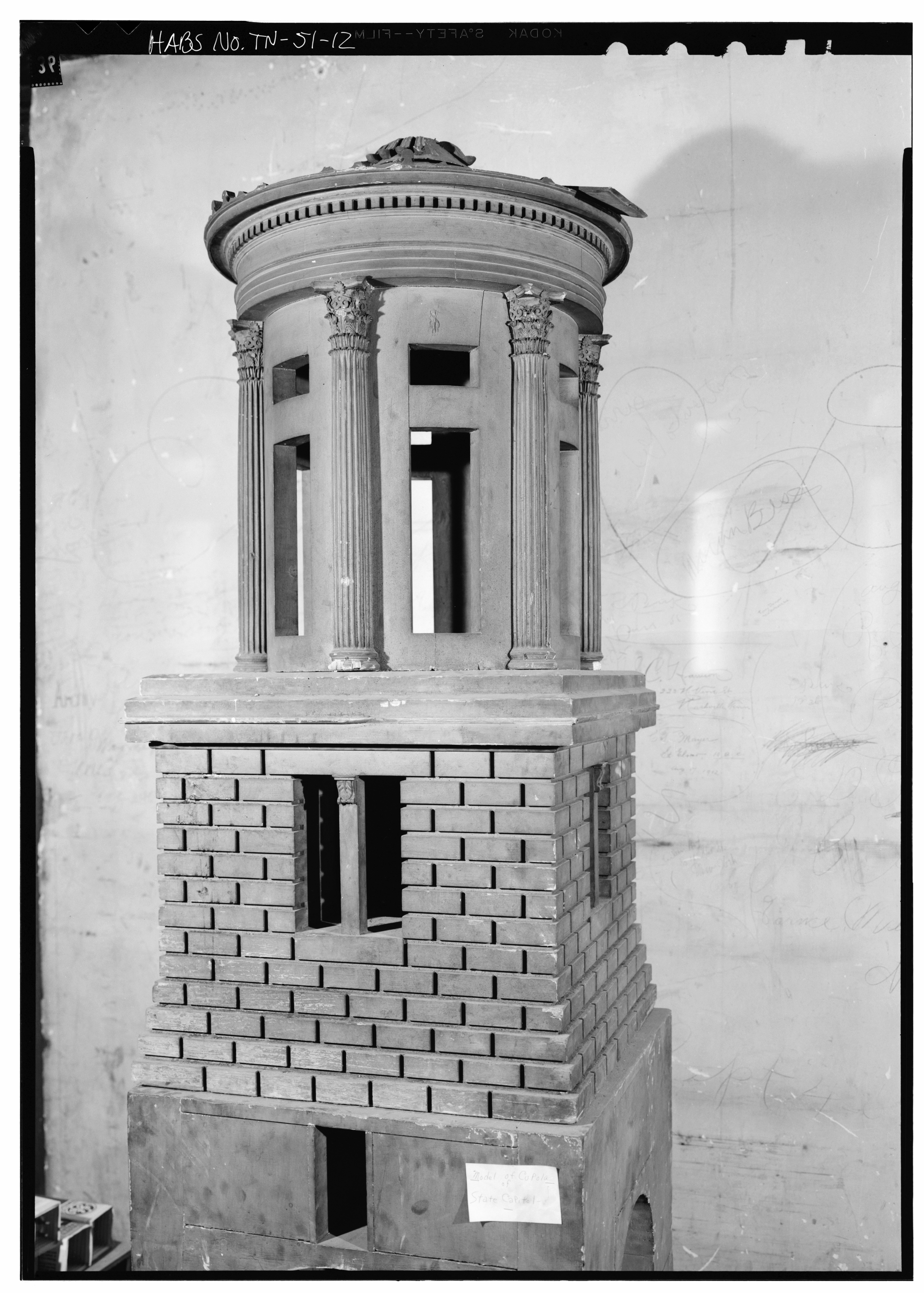
Wooden model of the cupola crafted by Strickland.

Shortly after taking office in October 1845, Governor Aaron V. Brown reported the project on schedule and budget, but that this was likely at risk of changing due to the massive scale. A protest against convict labor was held one month later by local artisans interested in working on the project, but the majority of state legislators insisted on this to reduce costs. On January 5, 1846, the legislature appropriated of $32,000 for 1846 and 1847, (Note: Equivalent to $1.02 million in 2025) and authorized the capitol commission to employ 150 convicts to quarry stone without allowing them to work on the capitol grounds. Slave labor was also used in the construction capitol's construction, which is believed to be "the most significant project where the [Tennessee] state government rented slave labor". Slaves were first reportedly used in site excavation and carting away debris before construction began. In September 1845, Secretary of State John S. Young recommending purchasing 15 or 20 African American slaves for the project. Sometime in 1846, the commissioners signed a contract with Nashville stonemason A. G. Payne at $18 per month (Note: Equivalent to $576.00 in 2025) for labor of 15 enslaved Black men, agreeing to provide them with housing. By the end of 1847, only the floor line of the ground story had been constructed, and in October of that year, the commission requested an annual appropriation of $100,000 for the next two years in their biannual report. (Note: Equivalent to $2.92 million in 2025) They also reported the quarries understaffed, and stonemasons on the capitol grounds often short of stone. As a result, 20 to 30 slaves were sent to work at the quarries. Strickland complained to a legislator that the site was a vandalism target in November 1847, and requested permission to remove vandals, which was granted by the legislature. On January 24, 1848, the legislature appropriated $50,000 per annum for 1848 and 1849, and authorized the governor to issue bonds to raise these funds.

In late 1847, Strickland set a goal of completing the building by the end of 1850, but the project was plagued by additional setbacks. On March 31, 1848, the commission authorized Strickland to use brick instead of limestone on the inside facing of the exterior walls and inside the interior partition walls. This resolution was overturned four months later and replaced with a resolution authorizing brick and plaster walls in the basement offices and committee rooms. This was also later revoked, but it is unknown when this happened. The project was delayed by the Tennessee cholera epidemic in the summers of 1849 and 1850, and work essentially ceased during this time. In October 1849, the commission reported the first floor was partitioned into state offices and the supreme court chamber, the entire story was arched over, and work had commenced on the second floor walls. Much of the stone for this floor, including the 16 columns in the house chamber, was quarried. At this time, the workforce included 233 people, including 112 prisoners. Shortly thereafter, new Governor William Trousdale urged the building be finished as soon as possible to save money, and asked the legislature to appropriate additional funds. On February 9, 1850, they voted to appropriate $150,000 for the next two years, which proved to be more productive than all the previous years combined. (Note: Equivalent to $4.5 million in 2025) During this time, massive wooden derricks were used to hoist some of the columns into place. In November 1850, a contract was awarded to Woods, Stacker & Co. to furnish the roof trusses. On October 17, 1851, Strickland reported the second-story walls were nearing completion, and the cornice was prepared and ready for installation atop the walls. The iron trusses were provided by Cumberland Iron Works in Stewart County, Tennessee, and assembled by convicts. The copper for the roof covering had been delivered to the site from Pittsburgh, and was ready for grooving and assembly.

=== Later construction and completion ===
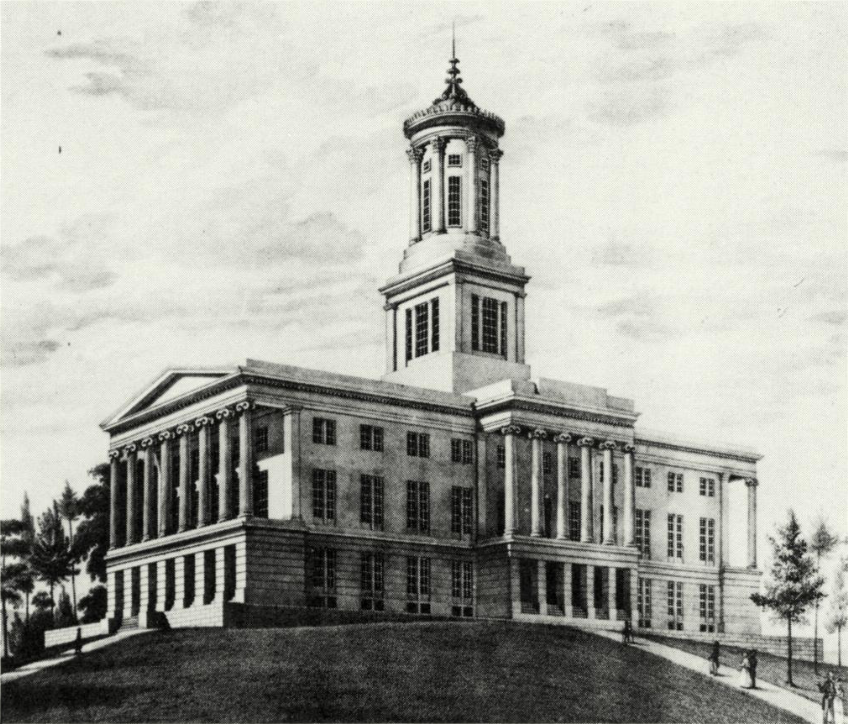
A lithograph of the Tennessee State Capitol produced by P.S. Duval & Son of Philadelphia in 1846. The depiction of the cupola varies from what was ultimately built.

Shortly after Strickland delivered his October 1851 report, the legislature appointed a committee to investigate the slow construction progress. This committee reported that construction proceeded as fast as possible, and funds were expended properly. They also recommended Strickland remain the architect and the legislature allocate an additional $250,000, (Note: Equivalent to $7.6 million in 2025) which occurred on January 31, 1852. One week later, the commission appointed a special committee to award contracts for interior marblework and wood and ironwork on the roof, and decided to construct the doors and window sashes from wood instead of cast iron to reduce expenses. On February 17, 1852, a $12,839 contract was awarded to James Sloan of Knoxville for marblework. (Note: Equivalent to $390,560 in 2025) On February 26, 1852, Maxey McClure & Co. was hired to assemble the copper sheets and attach them to the roof at a rate of $2.50 per 10 square feet (0.93 m^{2}). (Note: Equivalent to $76.00 in 2025) Two days later, the legislature passed a resolution asking the commission to ensure the house and senate chambers and other important rooms be ready by the next general assembly. That year, the building was completely enclosed and roofed. In January 1853, the commission accepted a proposal by William Stockell of Nashville to plaster the principal level for $4,000, (Note: Equivalent to $121,967 in 2025) which initially included the arched ceilings but later encompassed the legislative chambers. The commission accepted a proposal for furniture from South Furniture Manufacturing Company on July 15, 1853. They then solicited proposals for oak desks for senators and representatives, which were scheduled for delivery on October 1, 1853. Two days later, the Tennessee General Assembly met in the new statehouse for the first time. While it was considered habitable for ceremonial congregations by the legislature, the building was deemed unsuitable for the inauguration of Governor Andrew Johnson two weeks later.

In late 1853, many of the capitol's exterior features were still incomplete, and very little progress had occurred on the tower and stone terraces, since construction had focused on the legislative chambers and offices. The legislature appropriated $200,000 on February 28, 1854, (Note: Equivalent to $5.62 million in 2025) which they believed would be their final allocation. On April 7, 1854, Strickland died unexpectedly at his residence at the city hotel. The following day, a large funeral procession accompanied his body from the hotel to the capitol. His funeral took place in the Hall of Representatives, and he was buried in a vault in the capitol's east façade. Strickland designed this as his tomb the previous year, and the legislature designated it as his burial place five weeks before his death. His son Francis was appointed the new capitol architect on June 3, 1854, at a salary of $1,200 per year. (Note: Equivalent to $33,720 in 2025) Francis Strickland worked as an assistant under his father over the previous five years. The project was beset by additional setbacks. In the summer of 1854, construction began on the terrace walls around the building. Around this time, an organization representing stonecutters on the project asked the commission to agree to a demand of constant employment for them through March 1, 1855. They rejected this request, which prompted a strike. Two months later, the commission agreed to a 25-cent increase in the workmen's wages. (Note: Equivalent to $7.00 in 2025) On August 18, 1854, a contract was awarded to M. S. Shelton of Nashville for stonecutting the cupola columns at $2,800. (Note: Equivalent to $78,681 in 2025) On October 14, 1854, Sloan was once again hired to furnish the marble entablature for the senate gallery and four marble mantels. This contract totaled $1,600, (Note: Equivalent to $44,960 in 2025) which was pared down by the commission from Sloan's original plan for a fifth mantel and more expensive entablature.

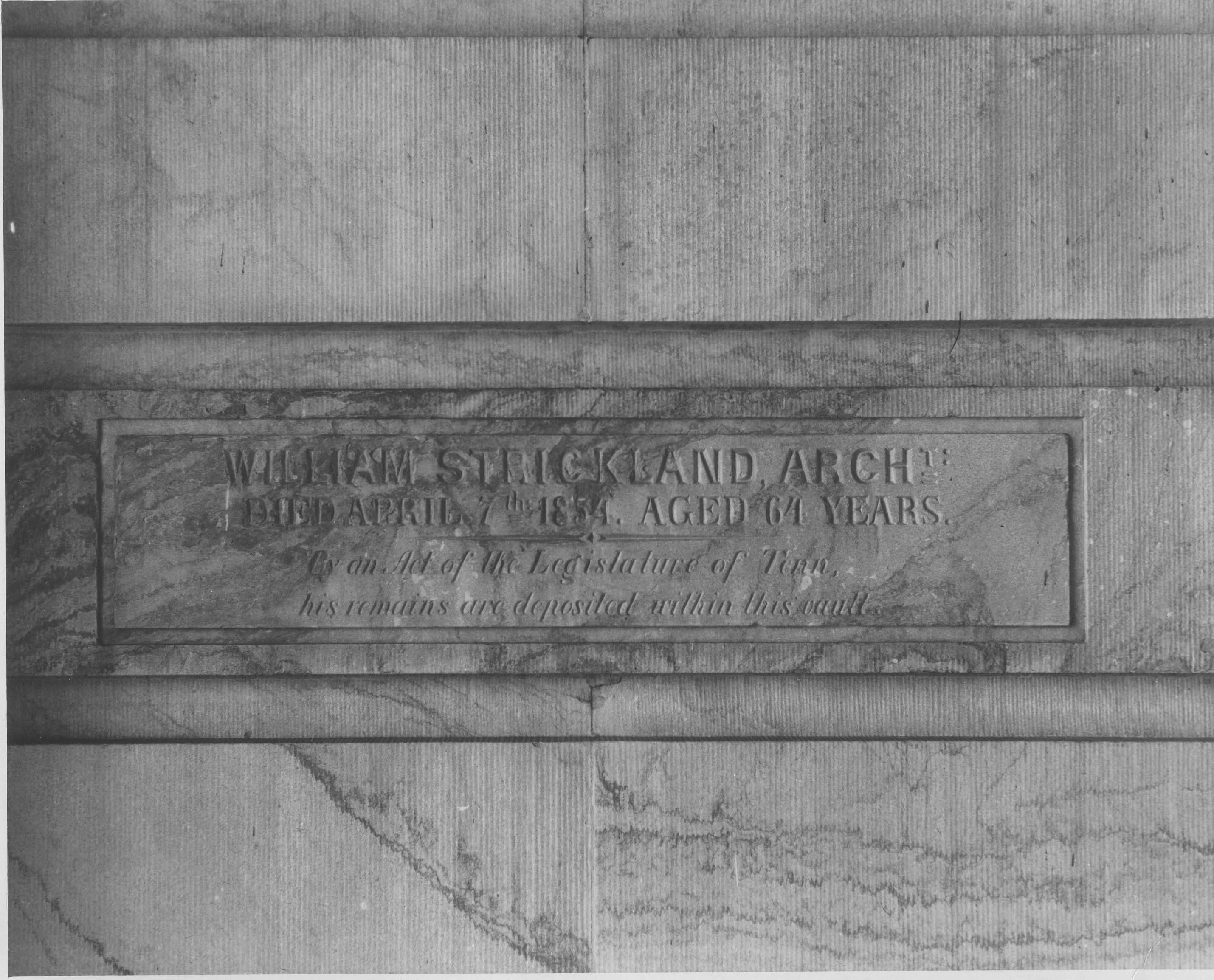
William Strickland died before the capitol's completion and is entombed in the wall.

In February 1855, Henderson Brothers of Nashville received a contract for toilet installation. Rainwater supplied the 10 water closets in the crypt level through a system of roof gutters, which drained through eight-inch (20 cm) cast iron pipes in the stone walls to cisterns under the terraces. These cisterns were made of cedar planks and lined with lead. On March 12, 1855, a tornado passed through Nashville and caused an estimated $2,000 in damage to the roof. (Note: Equivalent to $54,653 in 2025) (Note: Another source cites a figure of $10,000 in damage to the building, equivalent to $281,002 in 2025) A fire at the penitentiary destroyed the stonecutters' shops and tools 17 days later, rendering rough and dressed stone intended for the tower unusable. This resulted in temporary suspension of work to allow tool replacement and relocation of sheds from the quarry to the prison. The house of representatives passed a resolution in March 1854 asking the commission to supply the building with natural gas. In April 1855, E. L. Davis was hired to install gas pipes and fittings. On May 11, Cornelius & Baker of Philadelphia was hired to fabricate and install four gas chandeliers for $2,250: (Note: Equivalent to $61,484 in 2025) a 48-burner fixture for the Hall of Representatives, a 30-burner fixture for the senate chamber, and two smaller fixtures for the main hall and library, respectively. This firm had already provided chandeliers for the United States Capitol and several statehouses. The house chamber chandelier was noted for its elaborate design in Philadelphia newspapers. Another 30 fixtures were ordered from this firm over the next two years, with the last chandeliers installed in the main hall by the fall of 1857. On June 7, 1855, Sloan was hired for a third and final documented time (Note: Sloan was one of two documented bidders for marble work in the Supreme Court room in 1856, but it is unknown if he was awarded the contract.) to fabricate handrails and balusters for the stairwells, which he completed by November 1. The tower's blocks and columns were installed using a system of ropes and spars, and the last stone was laid on July 21, 1855. In the fall of 1855, Francis Strickland reported the tower was constructed to its full height, and work was underway on the ornamental leaves. Around that time, it was discovered that the convict labor, estimated at over $300,000, (Note: Equivalent to $8.2 million in 2025) had not been charged to the state capitol account. This inflated the cost to over $700,000, (Note: Equivalent to $19.1 million in 2025) prompting the legislature to require the penitentiary to record the value of materials and labor, and present this information to the commission.

On February 28, 1856, the legislature made the final appropriation for the capitol at $150,000. (Note: Equivalent to $19.5 million in 2025) Bids were received in May of that year for remaining plastering work, which included the first-floor vaults, the ceiling under the tower in the main hall, and three ceilings within the tower. It took 10 months for a contract award. Bids were solicited for marblework in the supreme court room in September 1856, but it is unknown who received the contract. In the winter of 1857, George C. Creighton, the building's superintendent, was arrested twice and fined $50 for disrupting the supreme court's proceedings. (Note: Equivalent to $1,361 in 2025) Creighton was supervising flagstone installation in the crypt below the courtroom. Francis Strickland was dismissed from the project on May 1, 1857, due to disagreements with the commission. On October 1, 1857, the commissioners reported four principal aspects of the statehouse still incomplete: the library, the ironwork for the secondary stairways and towers, the crypt, and the lower terrace. They were reportedly hesitant around this time to award contracts due to funding uncertainties and had already started shifting their focus to preparation for landscaping the grounds. Previous bids for ironwork were rejected as too expensive. These were once again advertised in January 1858, and the commission met on May 19 with three bidders, but their decision was once again deferred, this time for unknown reasons. H. M. Akeroyd submitted a plan for the library on December 4, 1858, which the commission adopted after thorough discussion. Shortly thereafter, Akeroyd agreed to provide drawings and plans for all unfinished work in the building. On March 19, 1859, the final stone, located in the lower terrace, was laid. (Note: This is sometimes considered the completion date of the capitol building, although interior work was not finished until December 1859.) On April 14, 1859, a contract was jointly awarded to Jackson & Adams and T. Robinson & Brother for constructing the state armory in the crypt's north end for $2,200. (Note: Equivalent to $63,057 in 2025) On July 17, 1859, Wood and Perot of Philadelphia received a contract for ironwork at $20,600. (Note: Equivalent to $590,442 in 2025) Work on the railings on the secondary stairs was finished by November 5, 1859, and the iron stairs in the tower were completed a few days later. Lampposts with sculptures Morning, Noon, and Night were installed by the entrances that month. The capitol building was officially completed in December 1859, when work on the library was finished. The project's final cost was placed at $879,981.48, (Note: Equivalent to $25.2 million in 2025) more than three times William Strickland's initial estimate.

=== Civil War, landscaping, and late 19th century ===
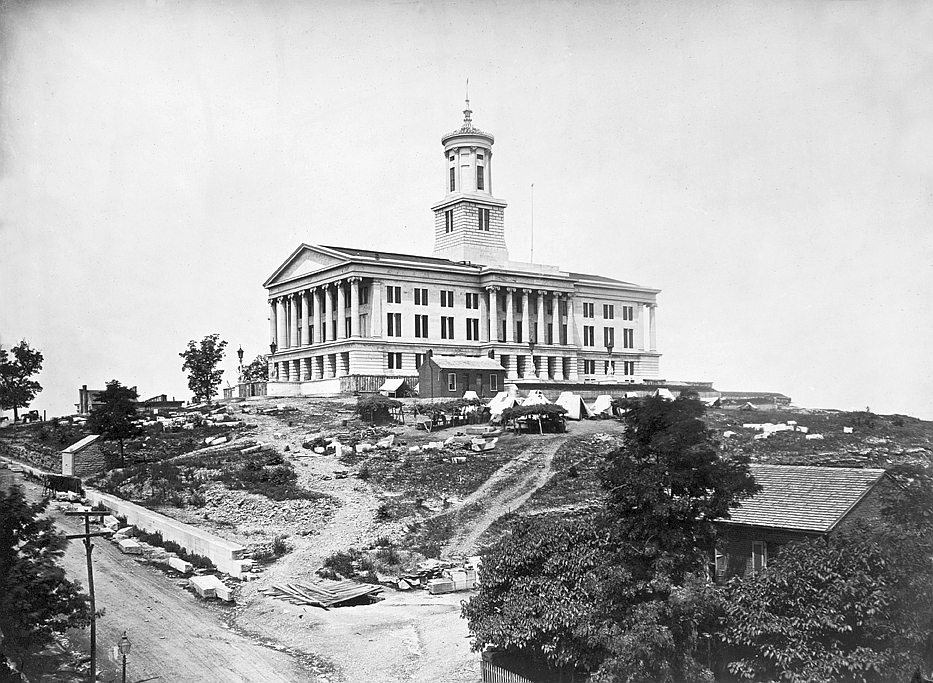
Photo of the Tennessee State Capitol during the Civil War by George N. Barnard.

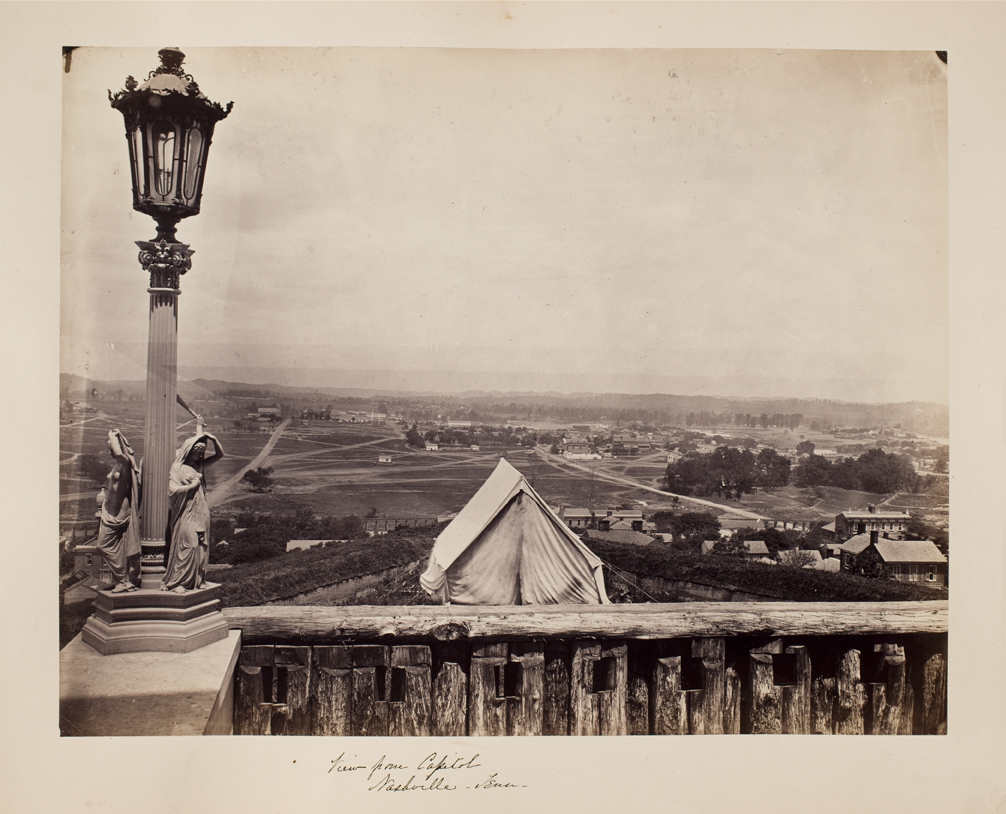
View from the capitol during the Civil War.

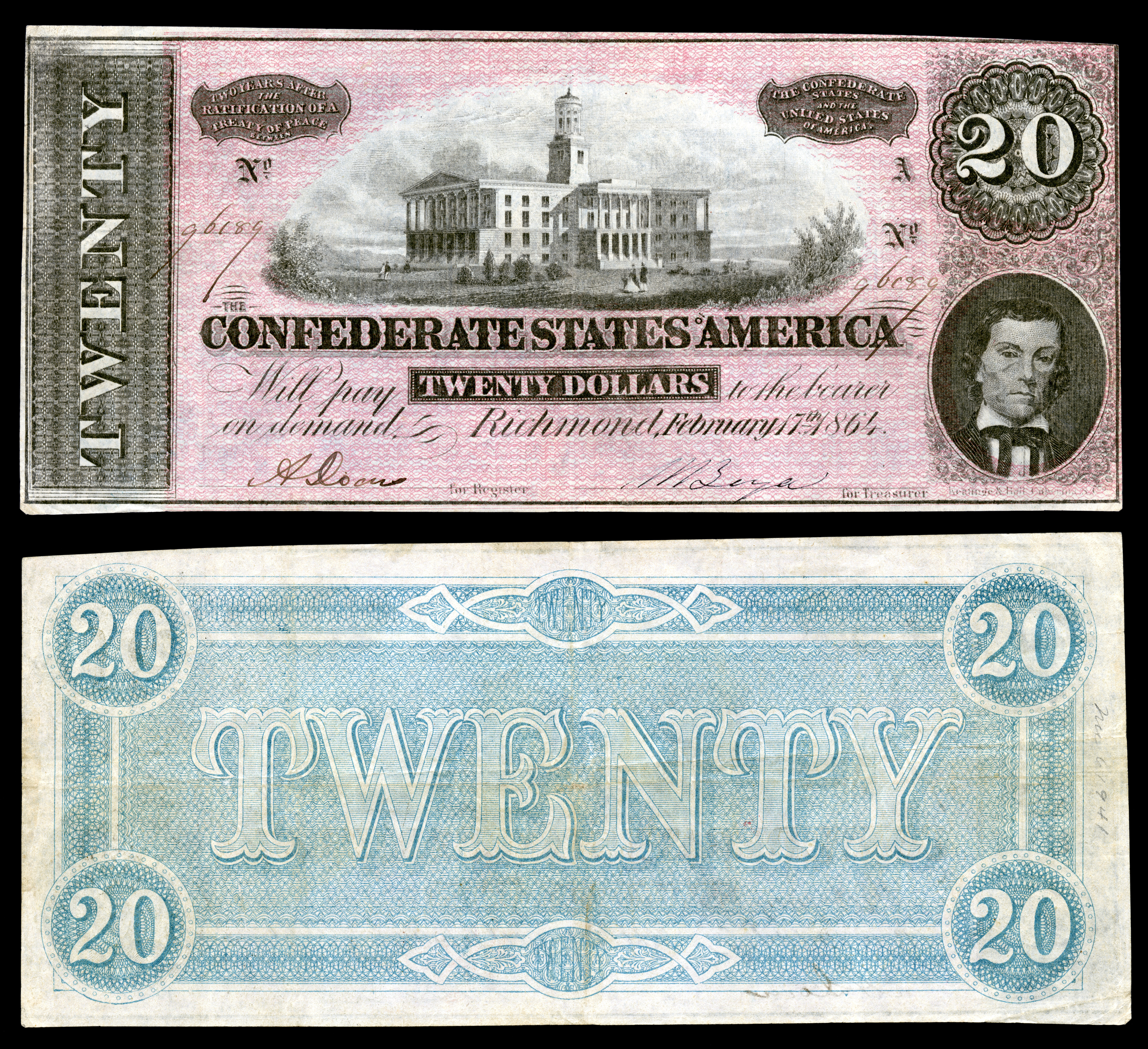
Tennessee State Capitol depicted on an 1864 Confederate $20 banknote.

While still under construction, the capitol commission began planning to landscape the grounds, but this was delayed by the outbreak of the American Civil War in 1861. Nashville became the first Confederate state capital to fall, enabled by the Confederate defeat at the Battle of Fort Donelson. Union troops seized control of the undefended city on February 25, 1862, and thousands of soldiers quickly poured in, establishing barracks inside the capitol building and camps on Capitol Hill and the surrounding lowlands. Expecting Confederates to attack Nashville, soldiers built a cedar log fortification and an artillery battery of 15 cannons around the building; they called this "Fort Andrew Johnson". Graffiti from Union soldiers still exists in the tower. An American flag belonging to sea captain William Driver nicknamed "Old Glory" was raised atop the east portico; this flag was reportedly the origin of the "Old Glory" nickname for the American flag. The building also served as a hospital for wounded soldiers after the Battle of Stones River. In the summer of 1862, Nashville became an important Union supply base and recruiting center due to its position on the Cumberland River and multiple railroads. It also served as an important recruiting center for the United States Colored Troops. Governor Johnson and Union troops used the capitol's tower to observe the Battle of Nashville in December 1864. Johnson ordered the troops to blow up the building if the Confederates threatened the city. The building suffered little damage during the war, but minor repairs were required in 1866 and 1867.

On July 5, 1870, the general assembly passed "An Act to Improve the Capitol Grounds". An 1865 senate resolution requested the grounds be landscaped as a Civil War memorial, but the 1870 law required the plans to be consistent with William Strickland's original plans. Most of these plans did not survive the war, however, and the memories of capitol commission chairman Samuel Morgan were used to craft new ones. New York civil engineer John Bogart was hired to design new plans for the grounds, and it is believed that he tried to follow Strickland's plans to the greatest extent possible. Along with the terraced walls around the building, Bogart's plan included a series of graded meandering walkways with stairs connecting the adjacent streets to the building, and walls along the perimeter of the rectangular grounds. On the hill's north side, a winding carriage road and small pond were built. Red cedars were planted on the grounds, in accordance with the hill's natural growth. Elaborate entrances flanked by gate posts were built at the four street corners surrounding the grounds, and the building's east entrance was configured to become the main entrance, as intended by Strickland. The east grounds contained an open concourse with two circular fountains and a site in-between for a statue of Andrew Jackson. A narrow road connected Sixth Avenue on the east, and looped around the north side to access the west entrance. Bogart's plan was adopted on July 1, 1871, and construction was underway later that month. Work continued over the next six years between April and November, and convict labor was also used in the landscaping. More than 35,000 cartloads of topsoil were hauled to the rocky hill to provide a base for the lawn and vegetation. The state prison superintendent reported on January 1, 1877, that the improvement project was nearly complete, and final work was finished on July 21, 1877. On June 10, 1880, Morgan died at the age of 81. His remains were moved from the original cemetery plot and reinterred in a tomb in the building's southeast corner on December 24, 1881.

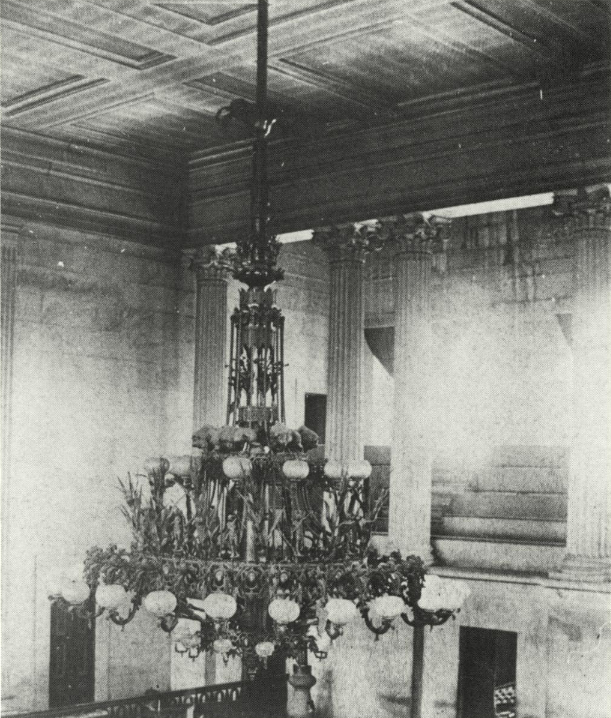
The House of Representatives chamber c. 1884 with the original chandelier.

In 1885 a series of major repairs took place. The copper roof, which struggled with severe leaks since at least 1867, was replaced with tin. The 10 original water closets were poorly ventilated and had been declared unsanitary by the State Board of Health and the Nashville Sanitation Officer. They were replaced by eight new water closets, located equally on each side of the building, that included toilets and urinals. The cisterns were cleaned and repaired with concrete. The windows had also been plagued by water damage and leaks, and several, including in the house, senate, and supreme court chambers; and along the main stairwell, were replaced with double-hung windows. Other broken window panes were repaired, and sashes and frames repainted. The lampposts by the east and west entrances were also painted. The offices, which had accumulated dirt and dust, were repainted, and carpets installed. Nashville's electric company installed electric lights on the capitol grounds in the summer of 1886. On March 5, 1889, the original chandelier in the house chamber was removed after a mechanic expressed concerns about its structural integrity. Multiple legislators had also expressed concerns about its potential to fall, particularly when it swayed in breezes, but an inspection after its removal found it structurally sound. An inexpensive drop arc light fixture was installed over the clerk's desk, and the main hall received electric lighting that year. Also that year, the building switched to steam for space heating, powered by a boiler plant on the north grounds. Many cedars on the grounds were gradually replaced by hardwood shade trees beginning in the 1890s. On March 7, 1891, Louisville architect Henry P. McDonald presented a report on repair needs to the legislature. This recommended a new heating and ventilation system, waterproofing work, erecting handrails around the esplanades, and covering the walls with a preservative. He also recommended repairs to the water closets, which continued to have poor ventilation; and stabilizing the north portico, which had started settling. A new heating and ventilation system was installed later that year, which included a new boiler plant outside and new ductwork and vents in the building. Despite someone falling to their death from the esplanade the previous year, the legislature did not believe railings were needed since the grounds were lit at night. Most of the other recommendations in the 1891 report were ignored. In 1895, more electric lighting was installed, which included converting the gasoliers to electricity, and the library and Adjutant General's office were painted and recarpeted.

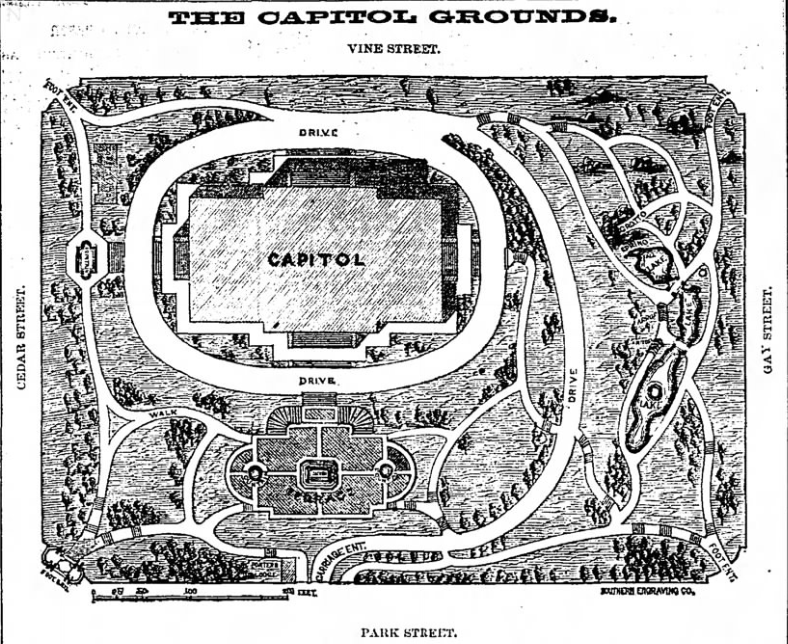
A drawing of the capitol grounds landscaping plans published in a Nashville newspaper in 1871.

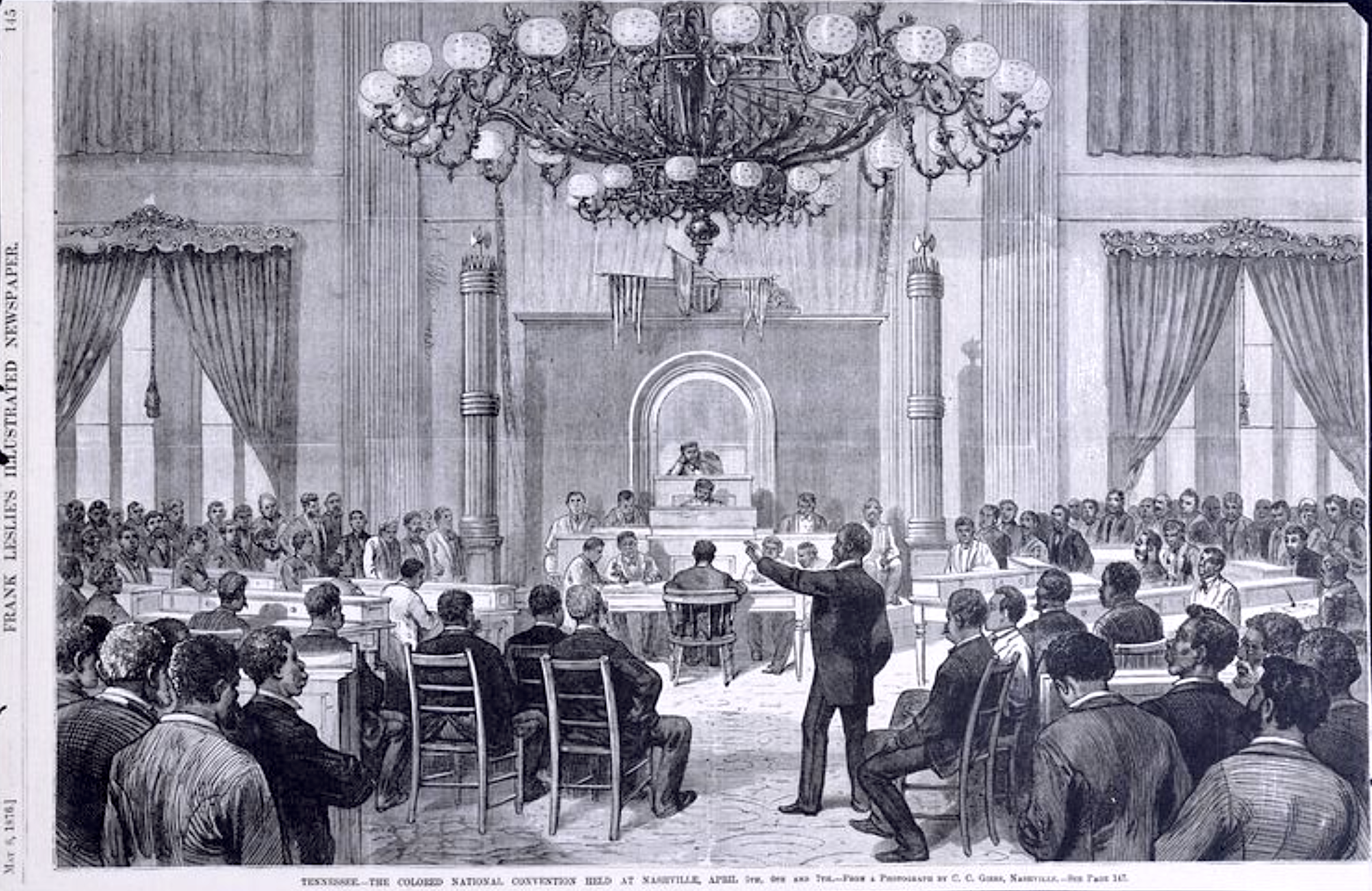
An illustration of the Colored National Convention in the House of Representatives chamber in April 1876.

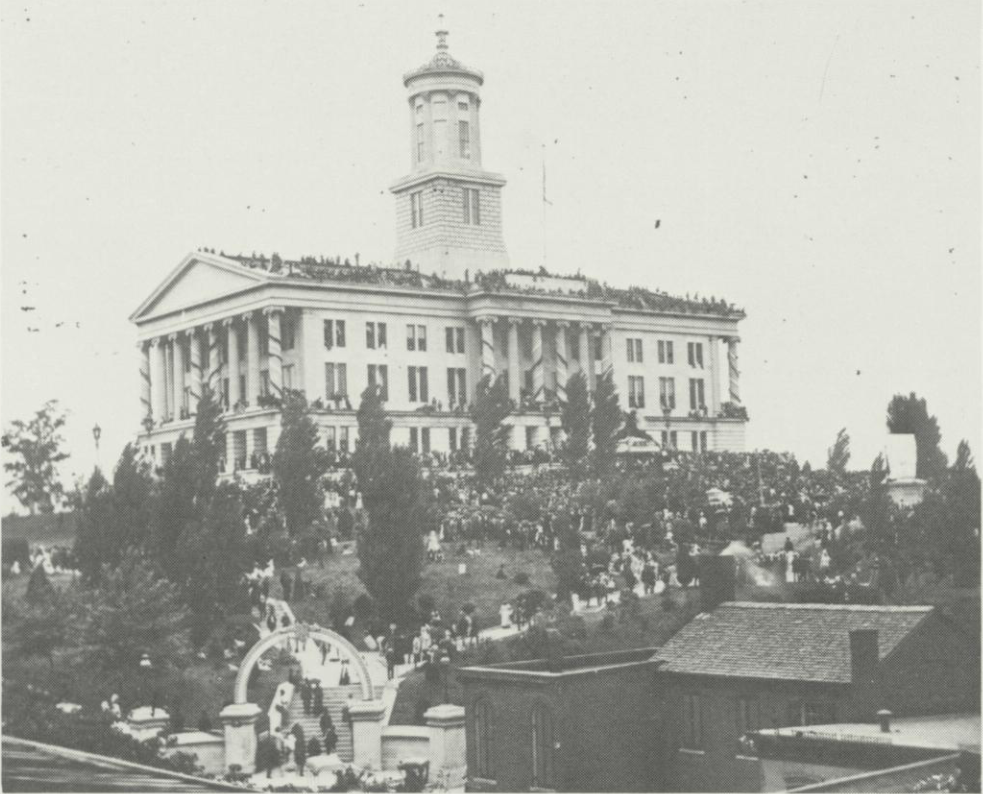
Dedication of the Andrew Jackson statue on May 20, 1880.

=== Earlier 20th century ===
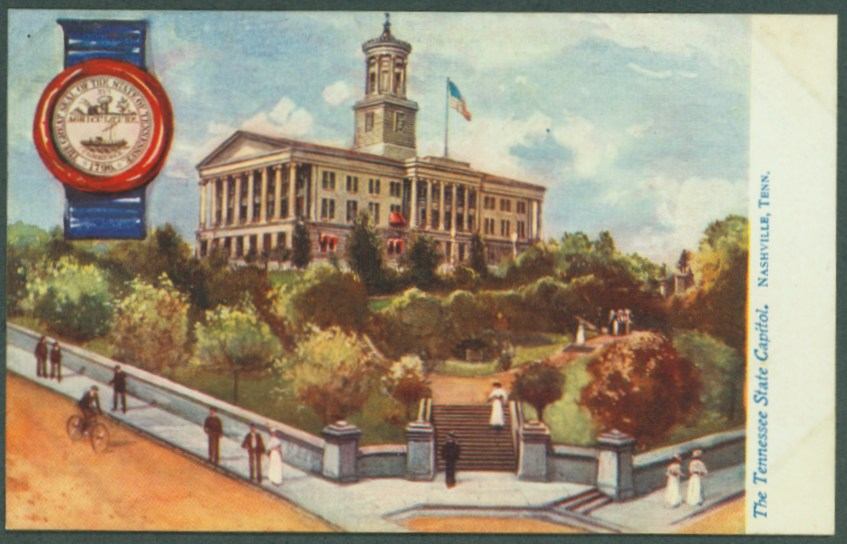
Postcard of the Tennessee State Capitol from the early 20th century showing the original landscaping of the capitol grounds.

In 1899, Nashville architectural firm Thompson, Gibel & Asmus investigated the capitol building and prepared an extensive report detailing needed repairs. At the same time, a special committee examined the building's condition, finding it susceptible to water leaks through the roof and windows, making it unsanitary. This caused foundation damage and basement flooding during wet weather. In March 1901, the legislature reported that a local architect was hired to examine the building and prepare a rough estimate for repair costs, and later that year created the Capitol Improvement Commission. Later that year, the first phase of what was, at the time, the most elaborate alteration and refurbishment to the building began. This included repainting all of the windows and iron railings installed in 1891, and frescoing the ceilings in the hallways in front of the four entrances. In February 1902, a contract was awarded to replace the original four exterior doors and renovate the entrances. New transoms and sidelights were cut around the doors, and new marble mosaics were installed in the south and east vestibules. In March 1902, a contract was awarded to reface the esplanade walls and pave the terraces with Portland cement.

The following month, the contract was awarded for repairing the exterior. Workers first cleaned the exterior stonework by scrubbing it with steel wire brushes, followed by coating with a preservative that consisted of a mixture of paraffin wax and linseed oil. Following this, the broken dentil moldings at the northwest and southwest corners were replaced. Many of the joints, including all of the ones in the tower, were dressed down and smoothed, and all seams were filled with Portland cement. That same month, contracts were awarded for constructing a new approach on the south end from Charlotte Avenue (then Cedar Street), which included stone gate posts and wrought and cast iron gates. A new space was constructed in the attic for the archives, which were moved from the basement where they were susceptible to mold and water damage. This required plastering and new roof skylights. Some of the architects involved in the restoration objected to this plan, expressing concerns about placing additional load on the roof structural members; they instead recommended partitioning a second level of the main hall between the library and senate chamber. The improvement commission ultimately decided to relocate the archives to the attic. Additional restoration work in 1902 involved minor repairs to interior stonework, which was contracted in the spring. The bulk of the capitol's first electrical infrastructure, including a 30,000 watt transformer, 1,200 base lamps, more than 1,000 receptacles, and outdoor pole-mounted arc lamps, was installed during this time. This required thousands of pounds of wiring strung through the building. The restoration cost $24,792, (Note: Equivalent to $745,378 in 2025) and was completed by the end of 1902. About $8,000 worth of minor repairs were conducted in 1903 and 1904, (Note: Equivalent to $223,826 in 2025) but little is known about this work.

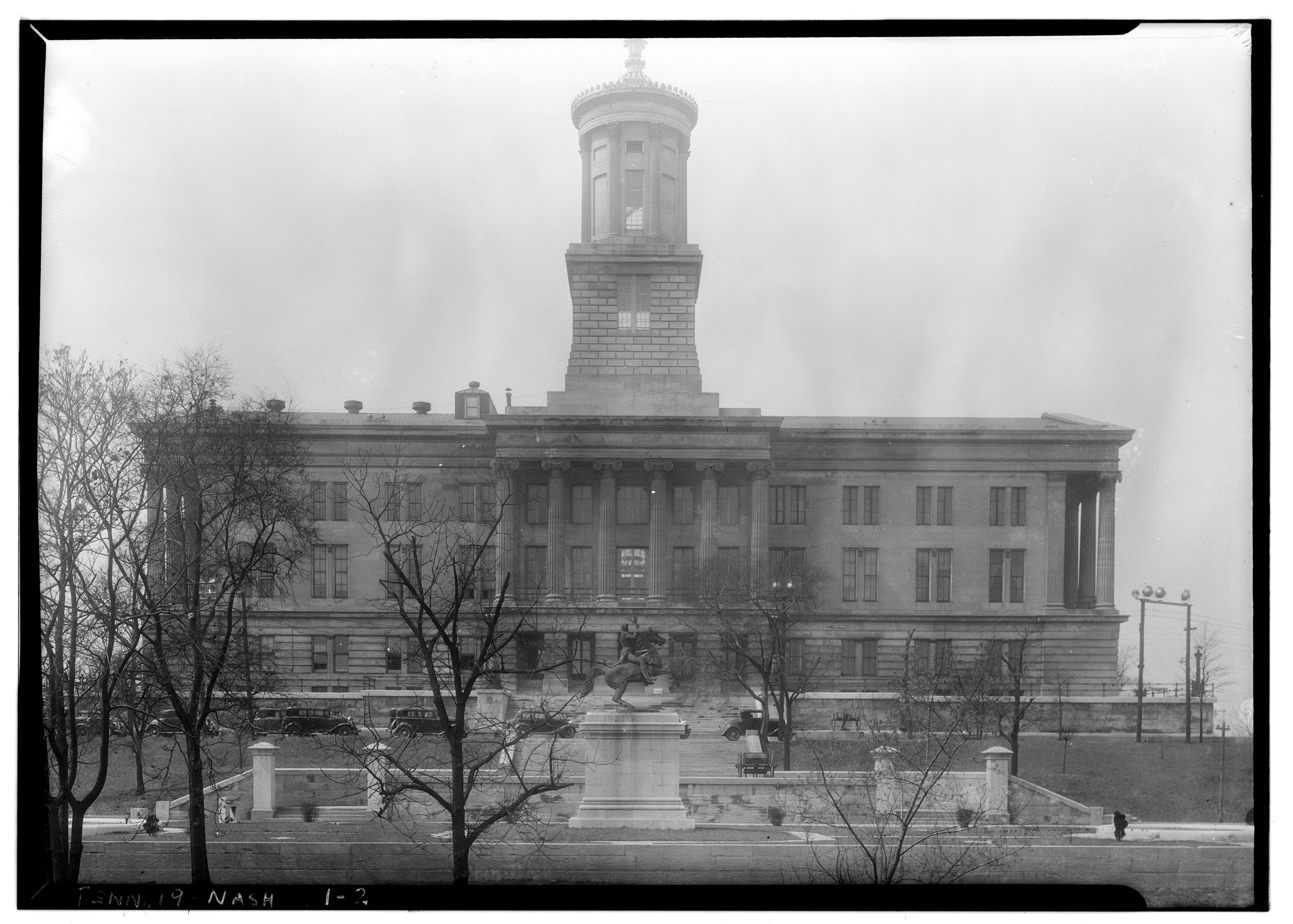
East view of the capitol and gardens in 1934.

In 1905, Governor James B. Frazier called attention to overcrowding in the capitol building resulting from the state government's growth. In response, the house passed a joint resolution asking for a feasibility study on constructing an annex to the building, but little action was taken. To relieve this overcrowding, the state started leasing buildings for office space in 1915. In 1917, a Nashville architect proposed a 10-story 60,000-square-foot (5,600 m^{2}) office tower atop the capitol building supported by an independent steel frame. This design included removing the tower, with a similar one atop the addition. On December 21, 1916, Elizabeth A. Eakin and Margaret J. Weakley formed the Tennessee Capitol Association, a non-partisan organization to advocate for preserving the building and grounds, and encourage the state to acquire adjacent land and expand the grounds. The organization worked over the next several years to purchase surrounding tracts for future expansion of state facilities, and lobbied the state to take charge of purchasing additional land. The first major state office building completed was the War Memorial Building south of the capitol in 1927. This included an adjacent plaza that was transformed into Legislative Plaza in 1974. The Tennessee Capitol Association played a major role in acquiring land for the Supreme Court Building in 1937 and the John Sevier State Office Building in 1940.

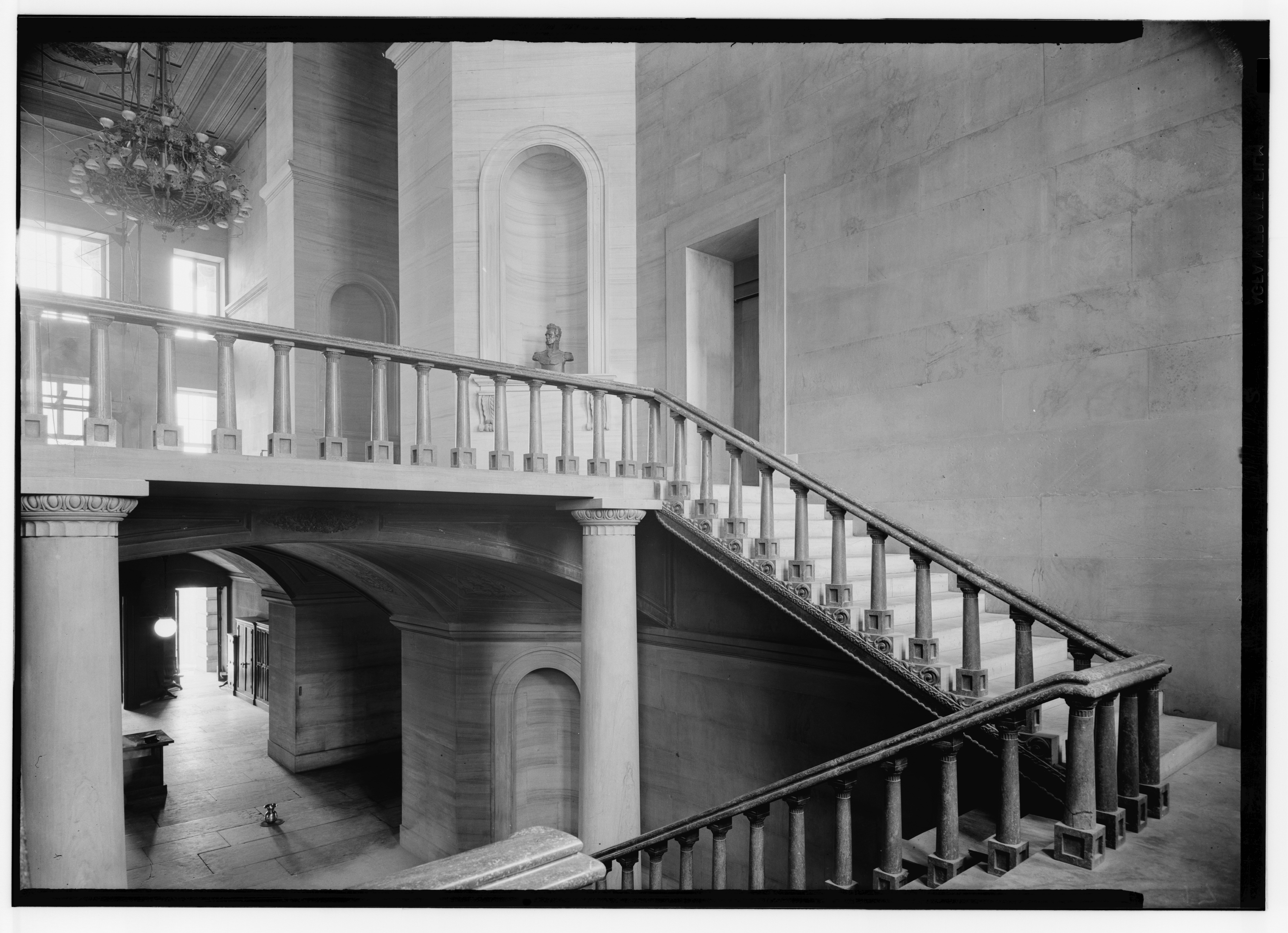
The main staircase in 1940.

Sometime in the early 20th century, the plaster ceiling in the house chamber was replaced with metal. Between October 1917 and March 1918, portions of the library's iron balustrades were removed to make room for new steel shelving, and new carpet was installed. These were initially used as dividers on the main floor, and reinstalled in 1953. The Treasurer's office received new flooring in March 1918, and the room was painted two months later. Five cluster light fixtures were installed in the house chamber in the 1920s. Concurrent with the supreme court relocation to its new building, the chamber was partitioned into six offices for the Secretary of State and a ladies' lounge in 1937. Between February and December 1938, the first floor's east side was renovated in a project that removed three walls that divided the space into long, narrow corridors; constructed a new reception and conference room for the governor, respectively; added new Georgian-style woodwork in the governor's suite; installed new six-panel doors in Ionic pilaster frames based on the house at Westover Plantation in Virginia; and replaced the east windows and installed hardwood atop the stone flooring in the southeast quadrant. As part of this work, Jirayr Zorthian painted murals in the governor's reception room, and the governor's office ceiling was stenciled. During this time, the governor's and secretary of state's offices were temporarily relocated to the second floor. As part of an urban renewal project initiated by the Housing Act of 1949, many of the structures around the capitol were demolished, and a new four-lane road called James Robertson Parkway was built around the north side of Capitol Hill.

=== Restoration ===
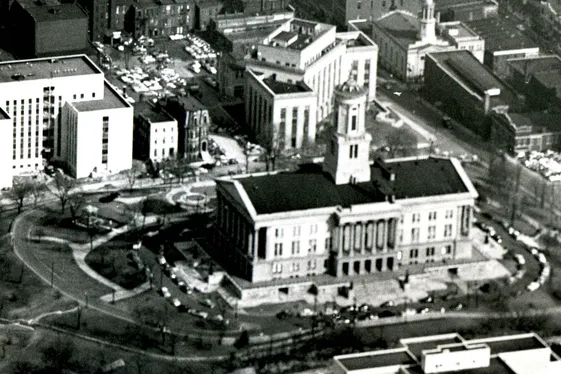
The deteriorating state capitol in 1954.

Despite renovation and improvement efforts, the capitol building continued to be plagued by structural deterioration, leading state officials to recognize that a large-scale, comprehensive restoration was needed. The exterior deterioration had been of particular concern since the early 20th century. Large cracks in the walls and columns developed over a long period of time, and ornamental details were degraded. The steel rails installed in 1891 were also largely rusted away. The need for restoration became particularly apparent when, on August 8, 1951, a large piece of stone on a north-side exterior column was knocked loose by blasting from a nearby construction project and fell to the ground. Different ideas were floated, including removing the ornamental work and replacing the building completely. In 1953, the general assembly appropriated funds for restoration and established the Capitol Hill Area Commission to supervise the project. The commission hired Nashville firms Victor H. Stromquist and Woolwind, Harwood and Clark to inspect the building and develop plans. That year, the library relocated to its new building, and the old room in the capitol was restored. The original iron balustrades were reinstalled, the walls and ceiling cleaned, the floor refinished and recarpeted, and new shades and drapes were hung. The firms examined the structure to determine which stones needed replacement or repair. The legislature established the State Building Commission to oversee construction of state buildings in March 1955; this agency assumed the roles of the Capitol Hill Area Commission. Plans for restoration were completed in the fall of 1955.

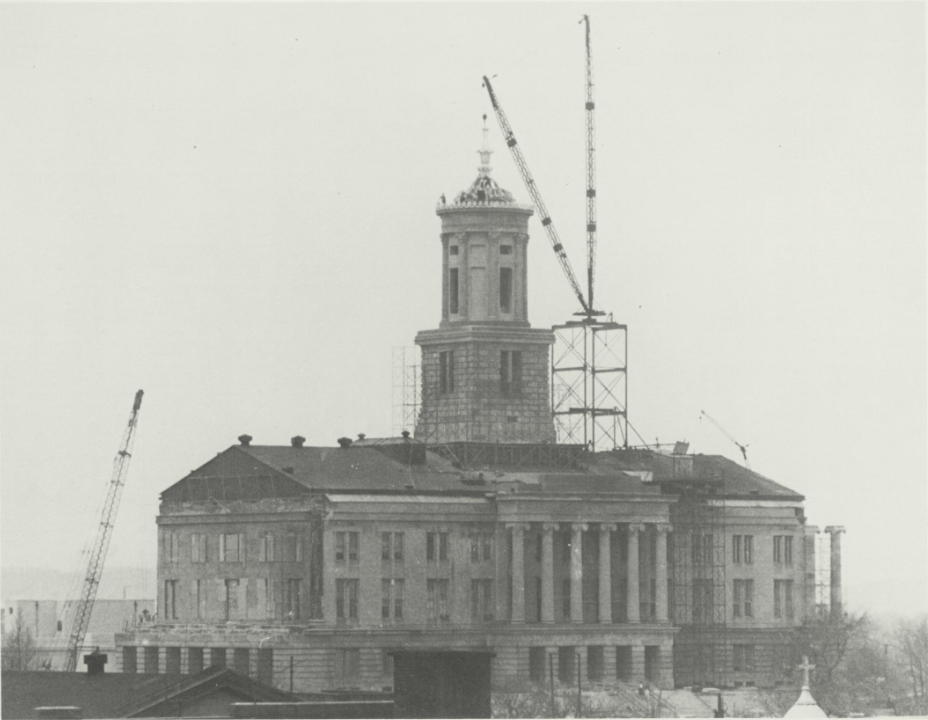
Exterior restoration of the Tennessee State Capitol, c. 1957.

A contract for exterior restoration was awarded in February 1956. About 90,000 square feet (8,400 m^{2}) of the original limestone was removed and replaced with thicker oolitic limestone from Indiana. This stone was chosen for its durability, strength, and resistance to harsh weather. All 28 exterior columns and supported entablatures, and the pilasters and entablature on the cupola were replaced. The stonework in the upper and lower terraces and the lower stairs was also replaced, the latter with granite. As part of this, the lamps with the sculptures Morning, Noon, and Night, which had severely rusted, were removed. The new limestone was quarried and fabricated by the Indiana Limestone Company of Bedford, Indiana. To ensure accurate replication, pieces of the original column caps and templates of other original stonework components were sent to the company. Mobile cranes with a 35-short-ton (32-metric-ton) capacity were used to set the new stones except for in the cupola, which were installed with a 50-short-ton (45-metric-ton) guy derrick atop a steel tower built up from the second-floor corridor walls. Following stonework replacement, the exterior was cleaned and waterproofed. The 1885 tin roof was replaced with copper, and the attic penthouse structure for the archives was removed, including the skylights and ventilators. Chimneys protruding from the roof were removed, and an enclosed ship's ladder providing access to the cupola from the attic at the tower base was constructed to replace a catwalk atop the roof. The original 1850s cupola roof was found to be in excellent condition and not altered, and all wrought iron in the building was determined to be in acceptable condition. All windows were replaced with pressure-treated pine windows, except for the ones replaced in 1938; and new bronze windows were installed in the tower. All of the 1902 exterior doors were replaced with oak doors, and bronze railings supplanted the iron railings on the porticoes. The exterior work was effectively completed by the end of 1957, at which point workers started installing new floodlights on the grounds and roof, replacing the old pole-mounted lights.

Before exterior work was complete, the general assembly appropriated funds for interior renovations in 1957, and the same architectural firms were hired for this. Construction began on February 20, 1958. The first floor was extensively altered, providing more office space. In the southwest quadrant, the three original transverse stone walls were removed, and the area reconfigured into eight square-shaped offices. Another eight offices were partitioned in the old federal courtroom in the northwest quadrant. These offices were given Georgian wood paneling, like the ones created in 1938. Two elevators were installed north of the east–west hall on the first floor, and restrooms constructed in place of the original secondary stairs on the first and second floors. The original limestone flooring in both floors' halls was replaced with Carthage marble and the ceilings cleaned and then repainted by Louis Bagnoli and Frank Bernarde under the direction of muralist Allyn Cox. New plaster was placed on the ceilings in the house chamber, senate chamber, library, and second-floor halls; this was subsequently painted by Bagnoli and Bernarde, similar to the original appearance. Four new chandeliers were installed in the house chamber, replacing the 1920s fixtures. New red oak doors replaced the original second-floor interior doors, and the original decorative moldings and ornaments were placed on them. Fluorescent lighting and new electrical, plumbing, and a heating and air conditioning system were installed in the building, requiring raising the floors in the house chamber and library, and a new equipment room above the second-floor men's restroom.

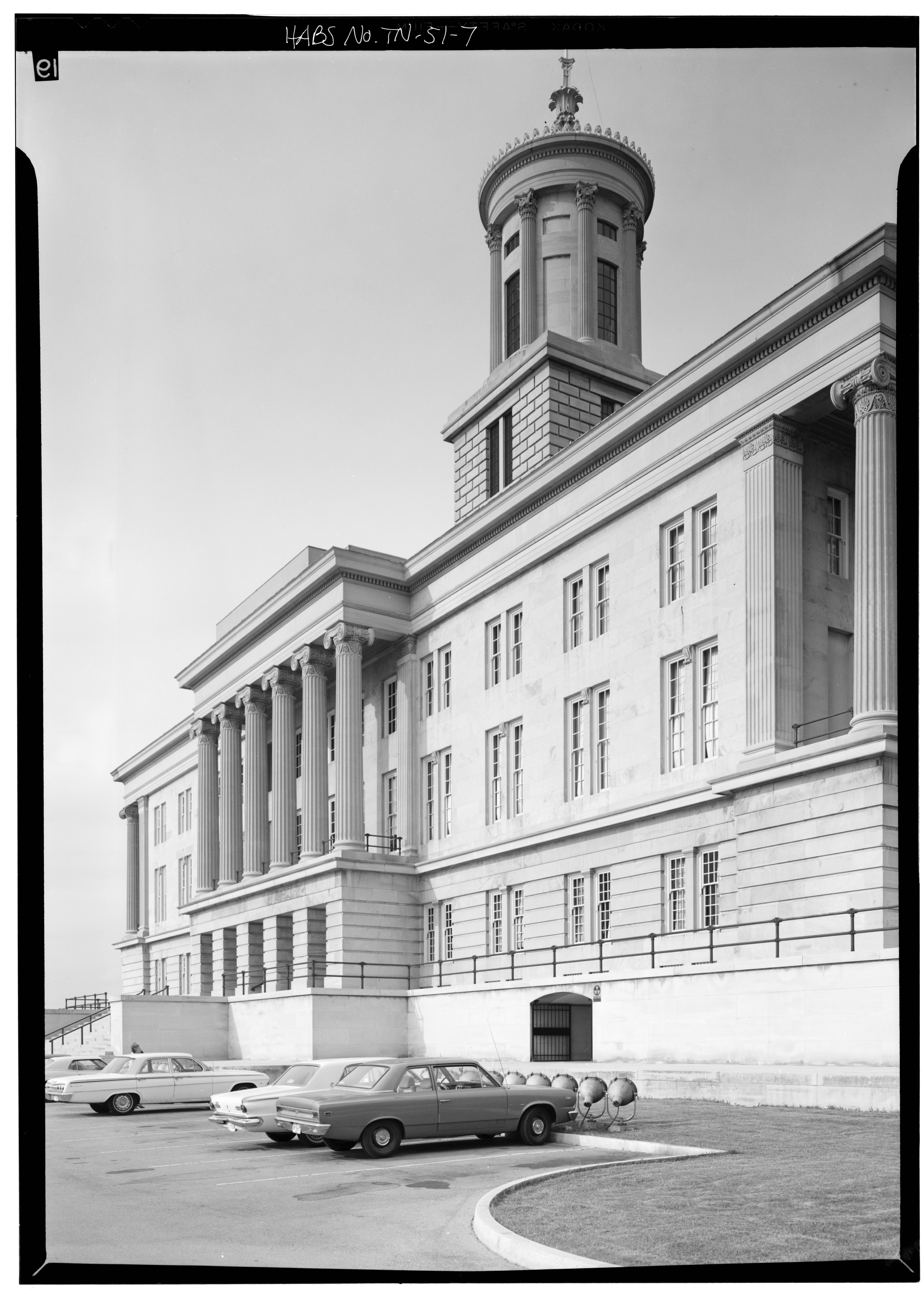
The west façade and parking area in 1970.

New offices for the Comptroller and other officials, three new legislative hearing rooms, a press room, janitorial locker rooms, equipment and storage rooms, restrooms, and a concession area were created in the crypt level. This involved lowering the floor level to provide adequate ceiling height. An intercom system was installed, allowing reporters to tune in to the house and senate chambers from the press room. The central crypt previously consisted of unexcavated rock before this. A corridor connecting the north and south crypt sections was constructed, and a new meeting room was developed in the east-central part of the basement. The original basement stairs were removed and replaced with a stairwell in the central hall. In conjunction with the interior work, the Motlow Tunnel was constructed to provide access to the basement of the statehouse from Charlotte Avenue. The tunnel and elevators had been advocated for several decades by legislators and citizens, due to the long climb required to reach the legislative chambers from the streets.

On January 4, 1959, the day before the start of the 1959 legislative session, the tunnel opened, and the elevators were placed into service. The substantial restoration completion and new tunnel were dedicated on January 15, 1959, by Governor Frank G. Clement, which included unveiling a new plaque on the first floor detailing the history of the building and restoration project. The exterior renovation project cost $1.97 million, (Note: Equivalent to $16.8 million in 2025) and the interior cost $1.84 million. (Note: Equivalent to $15.5 million in 2025) Final work on the tunnel was completed shortly thereafter, and it was officially named the Motlow Tunnel by the general assembly on January 28, 1959. Once building restoration was complete, work turned to improving the grounds. In 1960, new parking was constructed around the building, and a new access road built from 7th Avenue, resulting in closure of the 6th Avenue access. In the fall of 1961, additional topsoil was hauled onto Capitol Hill and more than 600 trees were planted. In conjunction with the capitol restoration, the urban renewal effort, which became known as the Capitol Hill Redevelopment Project, continued in the vicinity, resulting in several new office buildings, apartments, and skyscrapers.

=== Later 20th century to present ===
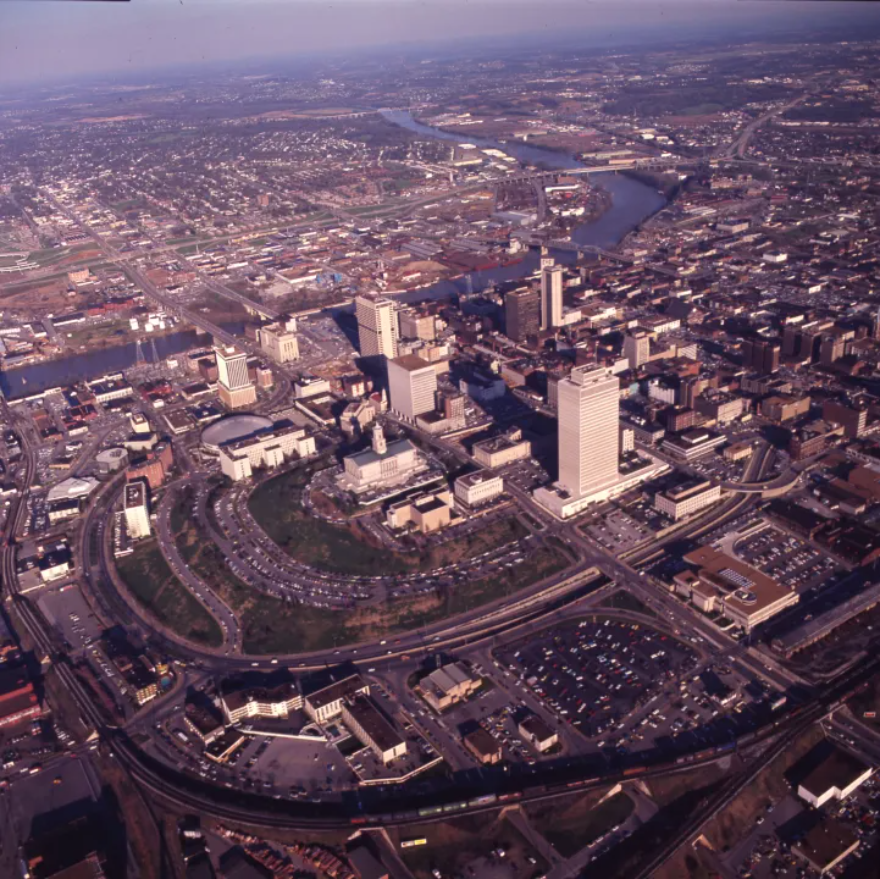
Downtown Nashville in 1973. Skyscrapers began to envelop the capitol in the mid-20th century.

The capitol was placed on the National Register of Historic Places on July 8, 1970. On November 11, 1971, the statehouse was designated a National Historic Landmark. In July 1986, the first phase of another restoration project began. This refurbished the old state library room by cleaning the stone and repainting, installing new 1850s-style carpet, and cleaning and polishing the chandelier. This work was completed in April 1987. The next phase, which began in June 1987, restored the first floor by refurbishing the artwork, installing 1850s-style carpet and new flooring, and revived the supreme court chamber to its original appearance. Gold-leaf chandeliers similar to the originals were hung on the first floor, replacing fixtures installed during the 1950s renovation, and older chandeliers were rehabilitated. Final work was mostly completed in January 1988.

In 1969, Knoxville architect Robert Church proposed a multi-level parking garage along the north and west side of Capitol Hill. As part of this plan, Church reportedly discussed extending the greenery of Capitol Hill north of James Robertson Parkway with state architect Clayton Dekle. The state began gradually acquiring much of the land north of the capitol in the early 1970s with the intent of eventually constructing a large office complex, necessitated by the state government's growth. Meanwhile, a movement arose to preserve the north view from the capitol. Starting in the mid-20th century, a building boom resulted in several skyscrapers around the capitol. In 1988, around the time planning for Tennessee's bicentennial began, John Bridges of Nashville-based Aladdin Industries conceived a vision for a public park north of the capitol modeled on the National Mall in Washington, D.C.. He shared a sketch and brief narrative with Aladdin's CEO Victor S. Johnson Jr., who contacted Governor Ned McWherter in 1989 and presented him with Bridges' idea. McWherter first publicly spoke about creating a linear green space here for the bicentennial on July 19, 1989, and several plans were presented over the next few years. A feasibility study for the mall was conducted in late 1991.

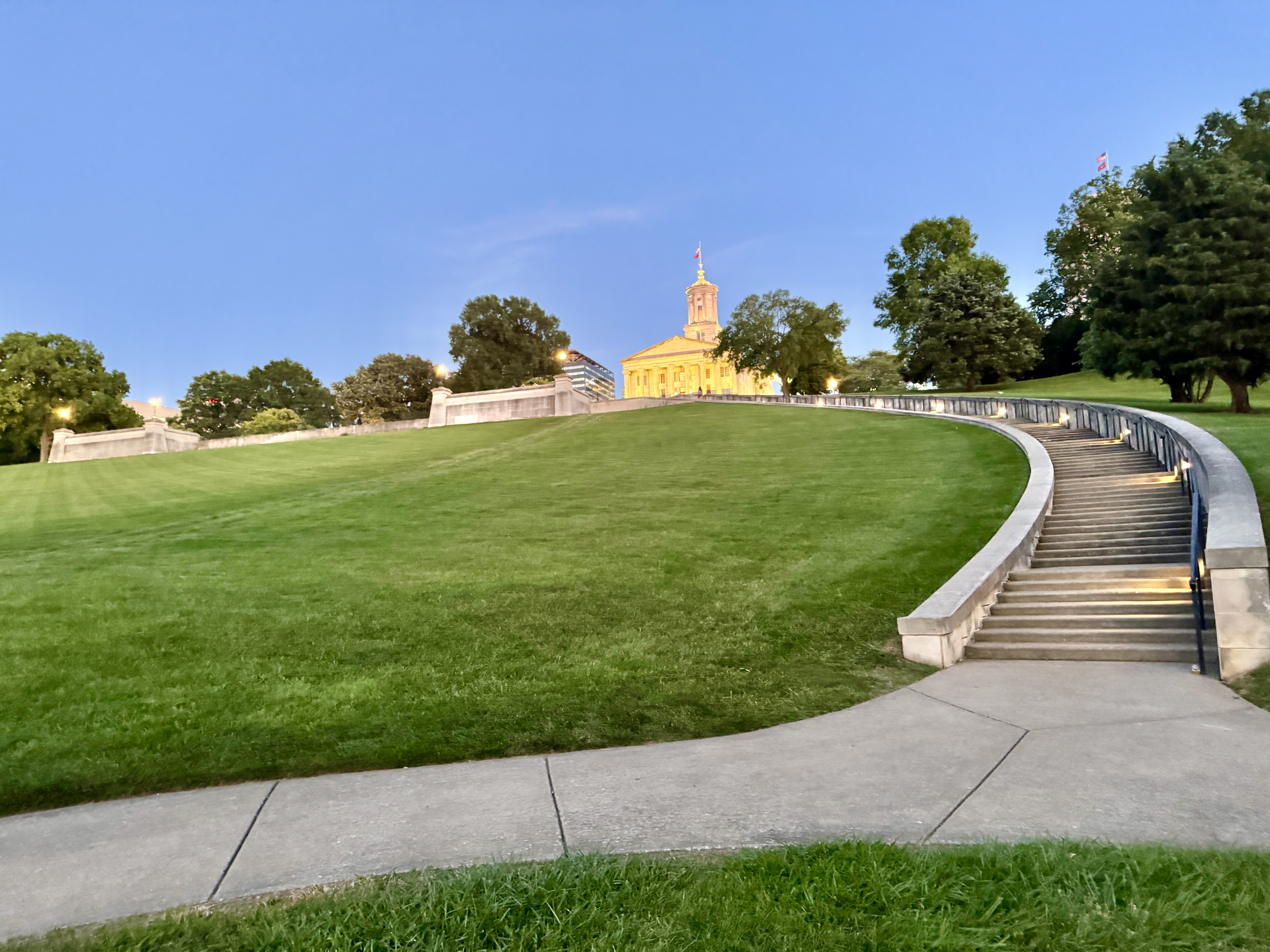
A stairwell connecting the state capitol to Bicentennial Capitol Mall State Park.

On August 27, 1992, Tuck Hinton Architects and staff from SSOE Engineers and Ross/Fowler Landscape Architects were hired to develop a master plan for the mall, which required altering the north face of Capitol Hill. The State Building Commission approved the plan on July 8, 1993, followed by the capitol commission 15 days later. Construction on the mall began on June 27, 1994, and was supervised by Heery International. To improve visibility between the mall and capitol, a state employee parking lot and a section of Gay Street on the north slope of Capitol Hill were removed, and replaced with a new overlook called Belvedere. Two stairwells–one from the capitol to the east side of Belvedere and another from the west side of Belvedere to James Robertson Parkway–were constructed. The mall was dedicated on June 1, 1996–the 200th anniversary of Tennessee's admission to the Union–as part of the bicentennial celebration. Additional features planned for the mall complex were added over the succeeding years, the last of which was the Answer Bell on Capitol Hill, dedicated on June 1, 2003. That year, the American Society of Civil Engineers designated the capitol a National Historic Civil Engineering Landmark in recognition of its innovative construction. The designation recognizes the interior columns built from single pieces of stone that required massive wooden derricks to hoist into place. It also acknowledges the groundbreaking use of wrought iron, instead of wood, for the roof trusses to reduce the building's vulnerability to fire.

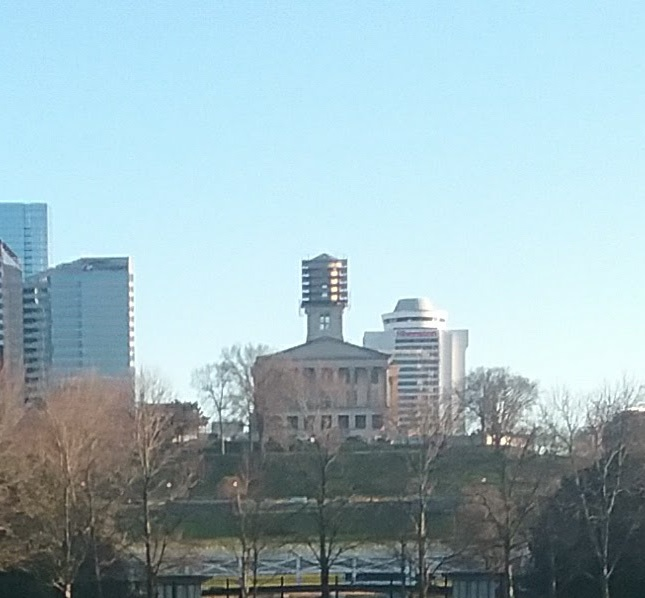
Restoration work on the cupola in 2017.

In May 2012, work began on a project to upgrade the capitol's heat and air conditioning, plumbing, electrical, and security systems. Offices in the basement were also renovated as part of this project. During this phase, workers removed drop ceilings, exposing hidden Roman-inspired brick arches, which were repainted and not covered back up. The project was completed in December 2012 at a cost of $15.7 million. (Note: Equivalent to $21.7 million in 2025) A tunnel was constructed between the capitol and the Cordell Hull State Office Building as part of a renovation of this building between May 2016 and January 2018. On November 2, 2016, restoration of the cupola began. Major activities commenced on May 31, 2017, which required erecting scaffolding around the cupola and removal of the top. The decorative cast iron elements were removed and then refurbished and repainted, before being reinstalled. The copper roof was replaced, deteriorating stone was repaired or replaced, and all joints were remortared. Cracks in the iron staircase were repaired, and a new flagpole was installed. The final restoration element replaced old interior and exterior light fixtures with LED lighting. The $2.3 million project was completed on May 7, 2018. (Note: Equivalent to $2.9 million in 2025) LED floodlights were installed on the grounds in 2020. In 2021, a project relandscaped the capitol grounds, added new stairways to the northwest and east sides of the building, and installed handrails on existing staircases. In January 2025 the second phase of a renovation of the War Memorial Building and Legislative Plaza began, which includes a new capitol visitor center in the latter structure and refurbishing the Motlow Tunnel. Work is expected to be completed in January 2027. In February 2025, the general assembly passed a resolution honoring 15 enslaved craftsmen who helped build the capitol. On May 7, 2025, a $28 million project began to replace the roof, install windows and doors that replicate Strickland's original design, and prevent leaks in the cupola. Completion is expected in fall 2026.

== Gallery ==
Exterior and grounds

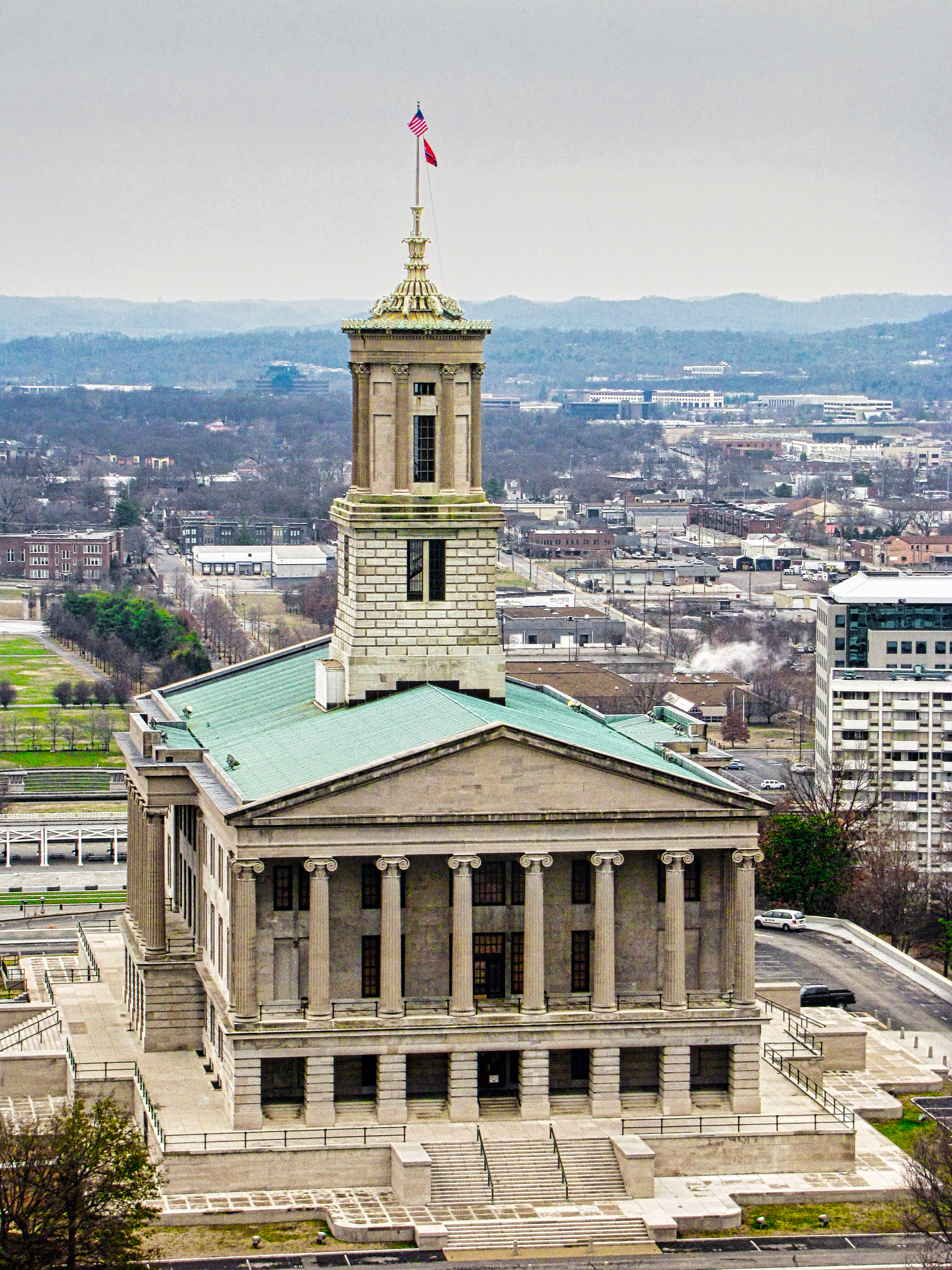
Aerial view of the Capitol

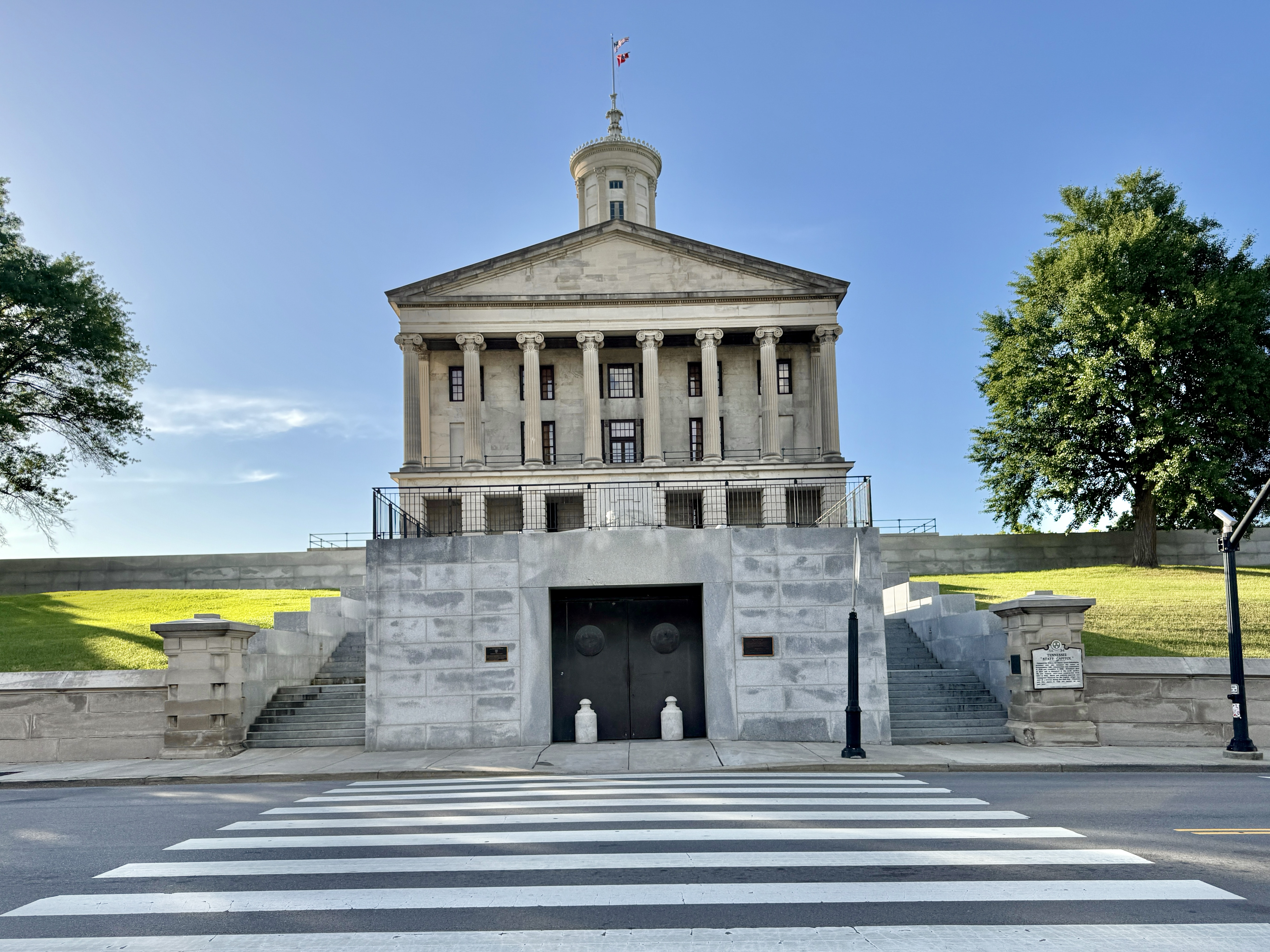
Entrance to the Motlow Tunnel

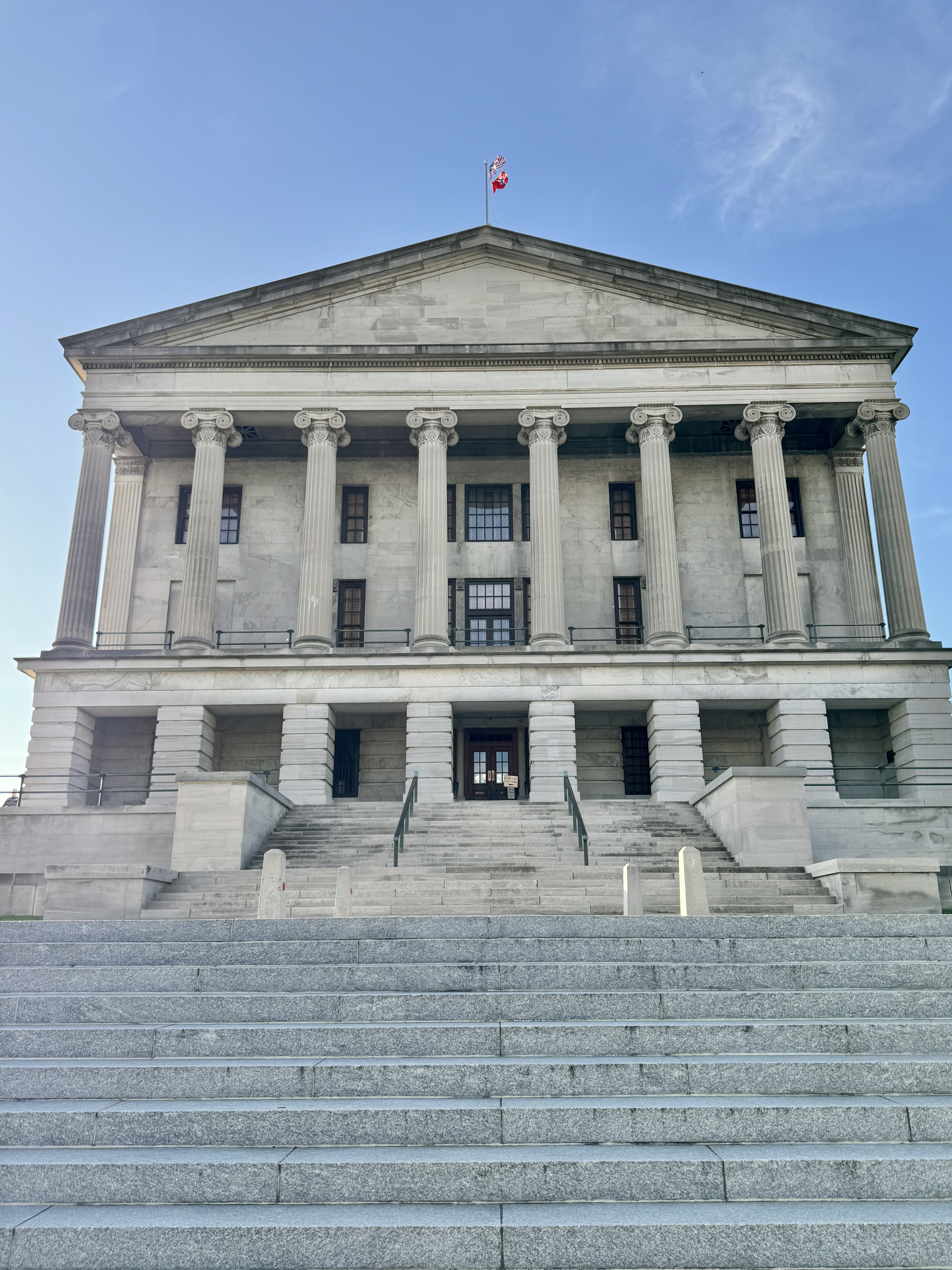
South entrance stairs

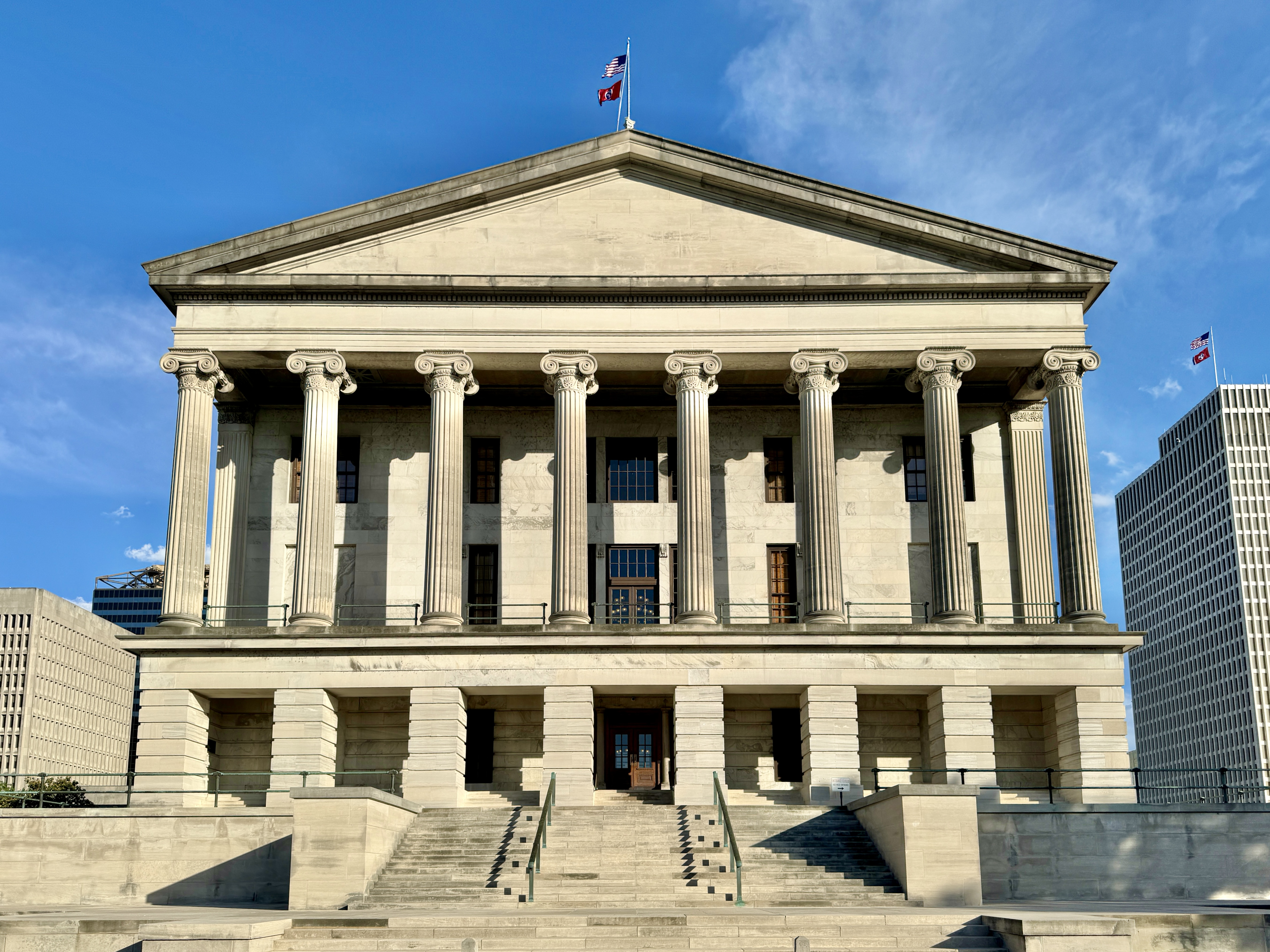
North side and stairs

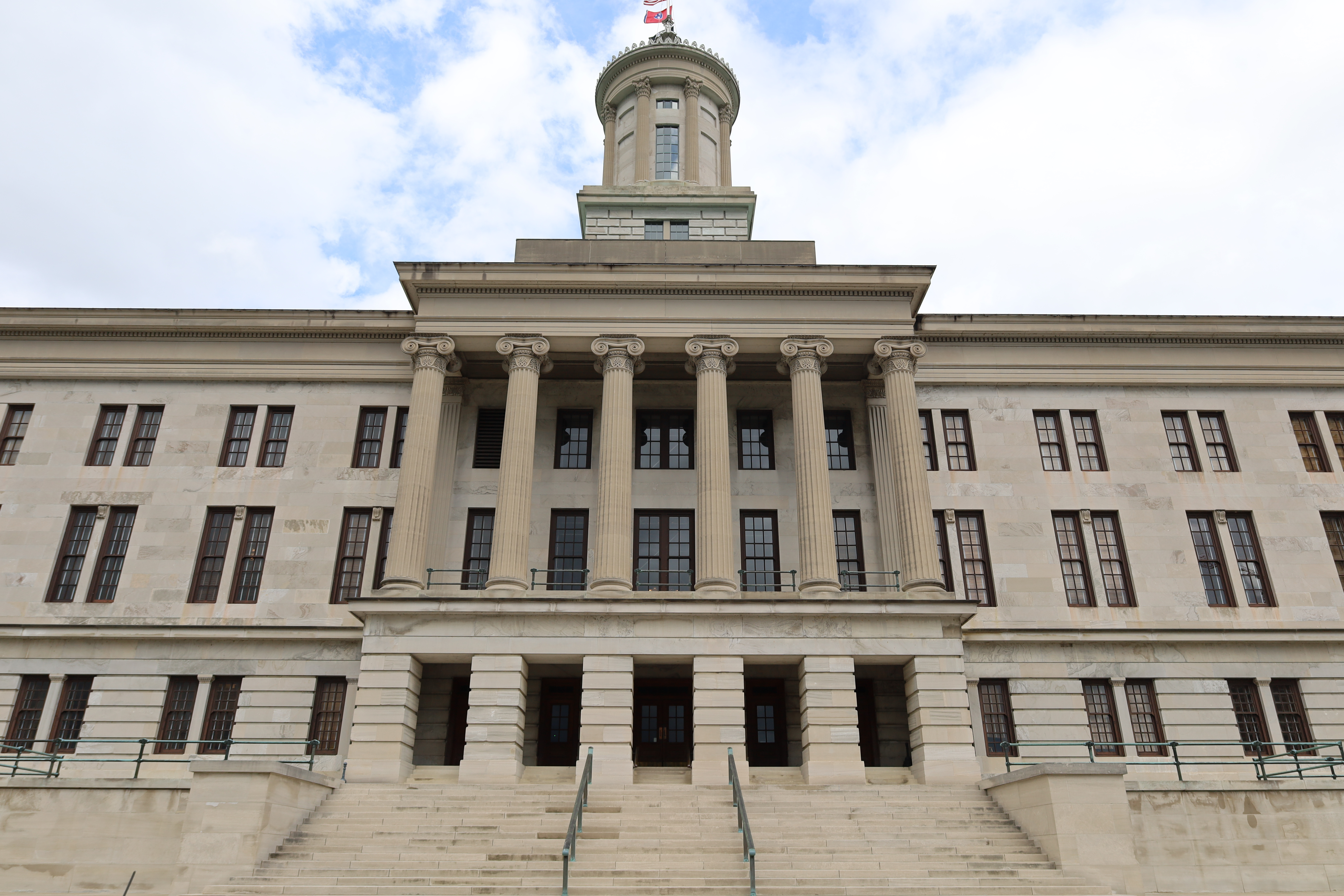
West side and stairs

East side

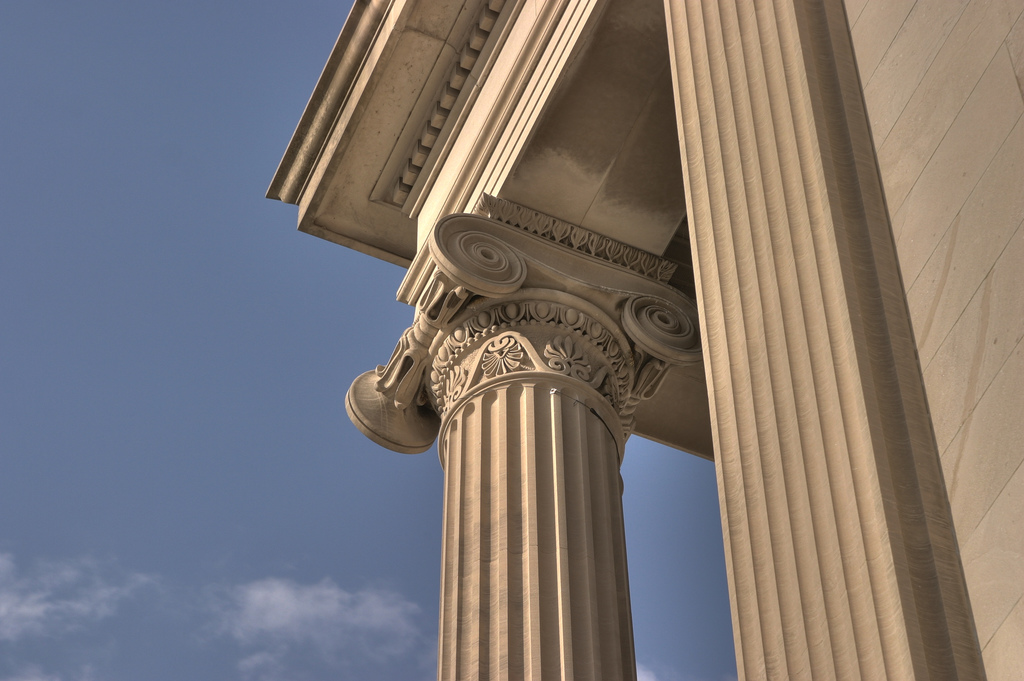
Closeup of column and pilaster

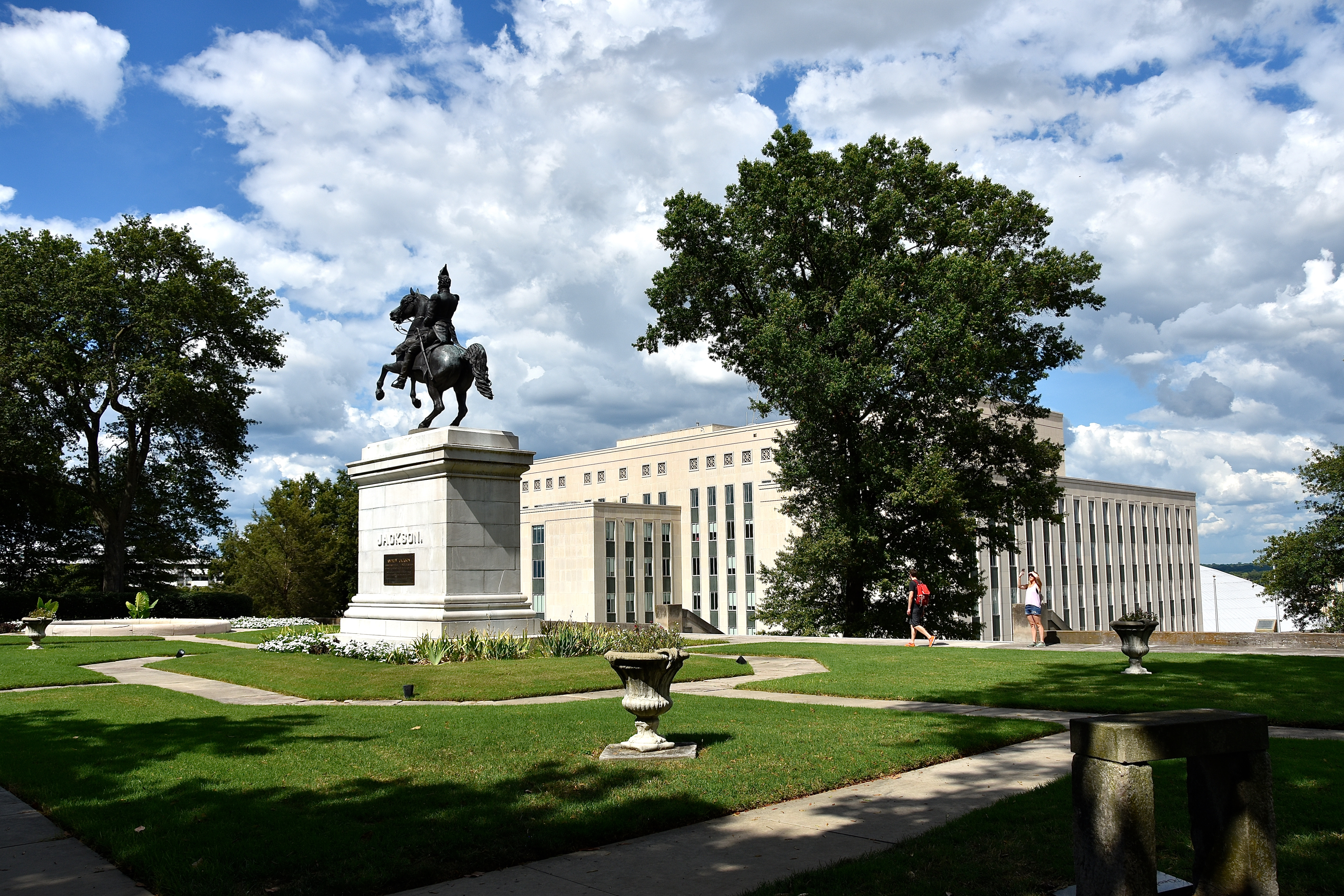
East plaza and gardens

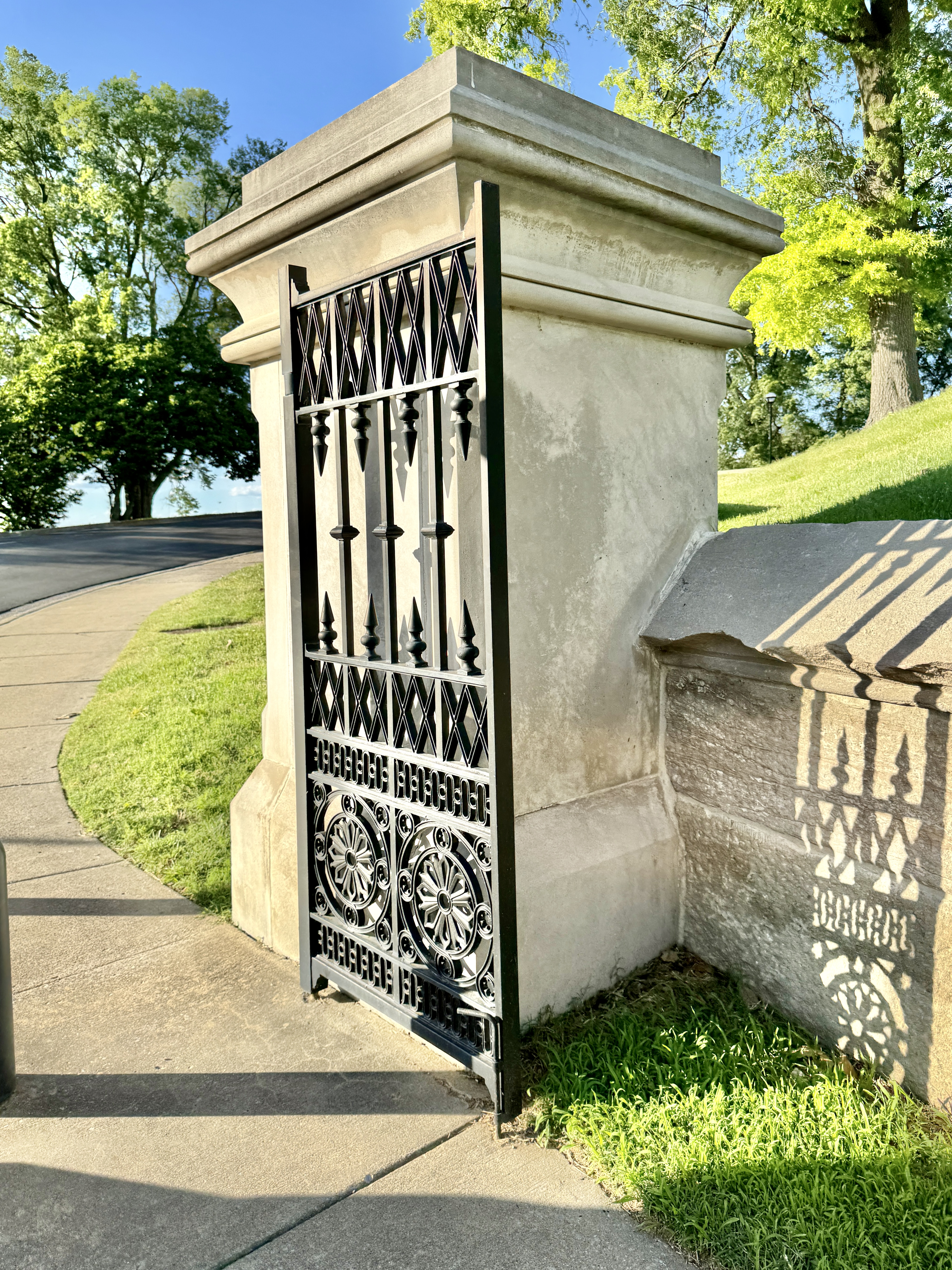
Gate at grounds entrance

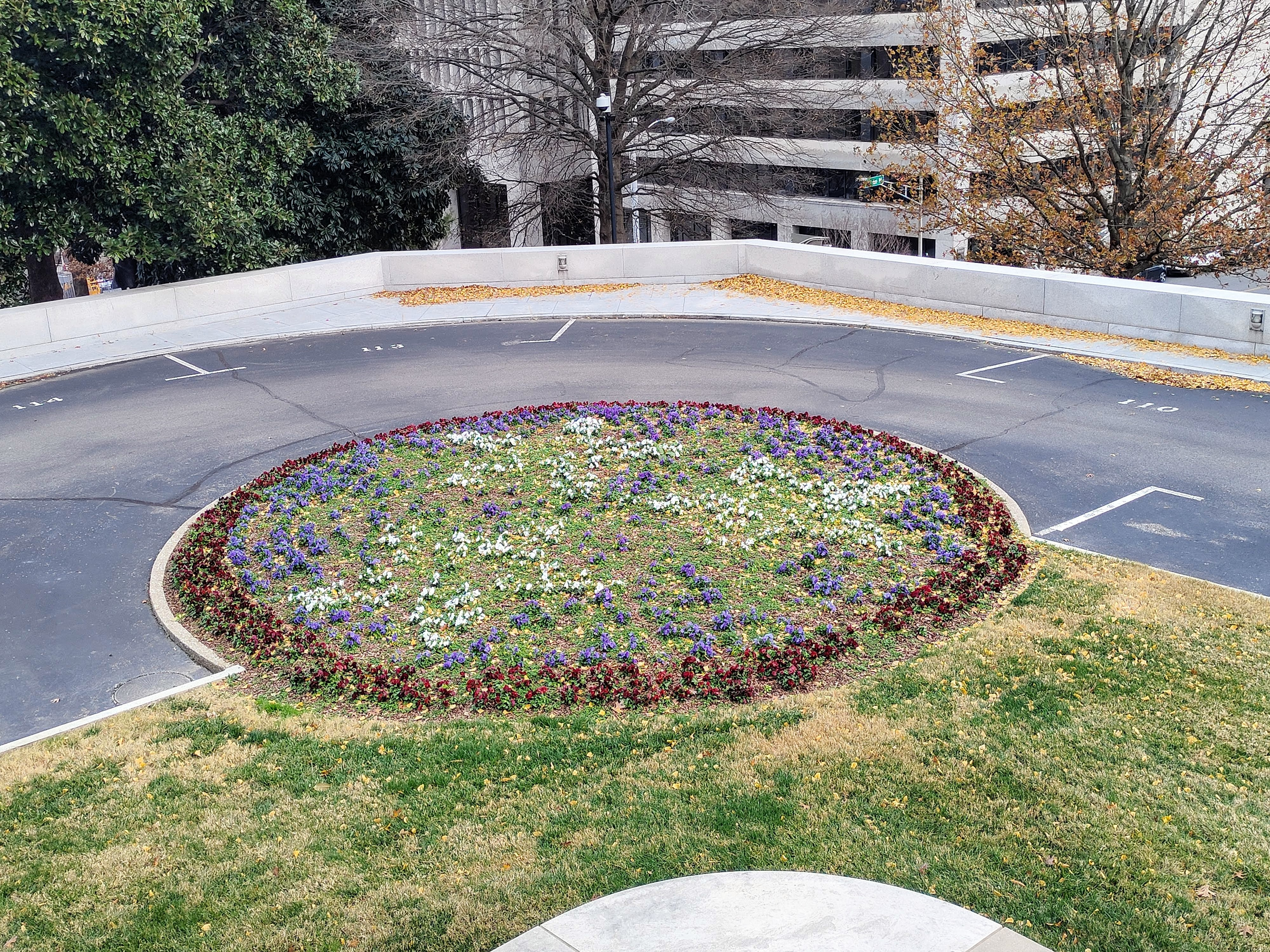
Flowers arranged in Tennessee Flag logo
Interior

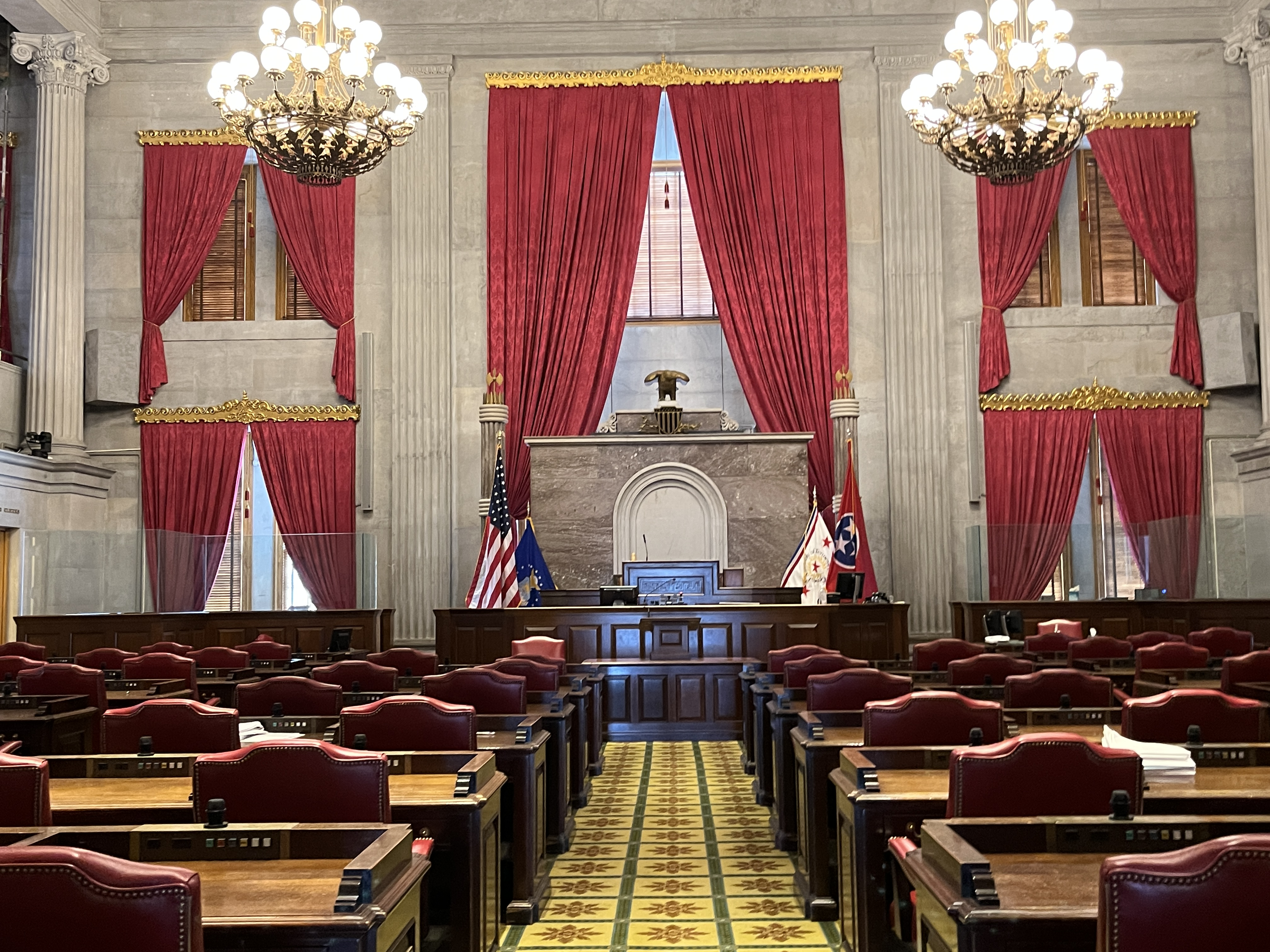
House chamber floor

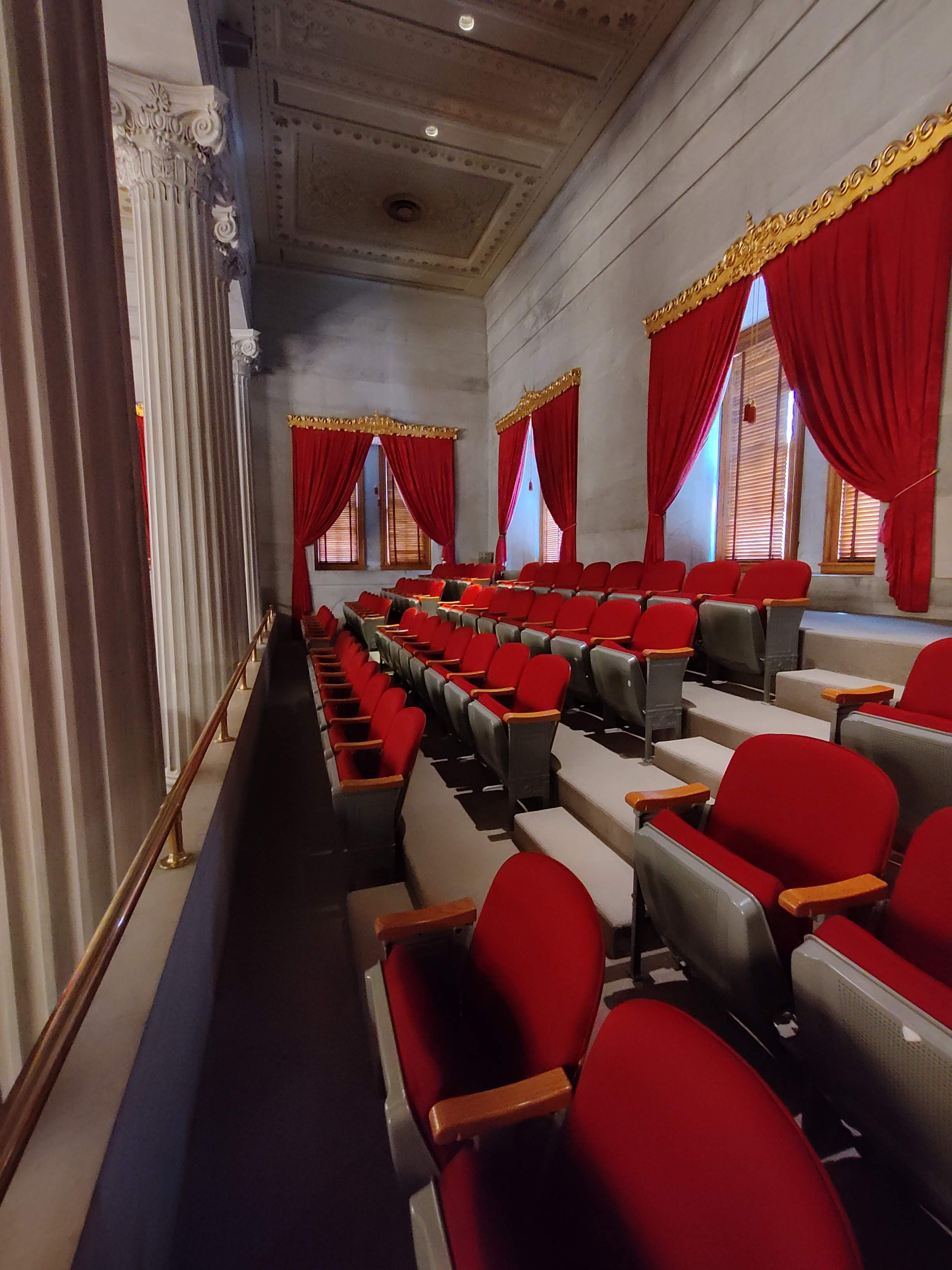
Viewing gallery and curtains in House chamber

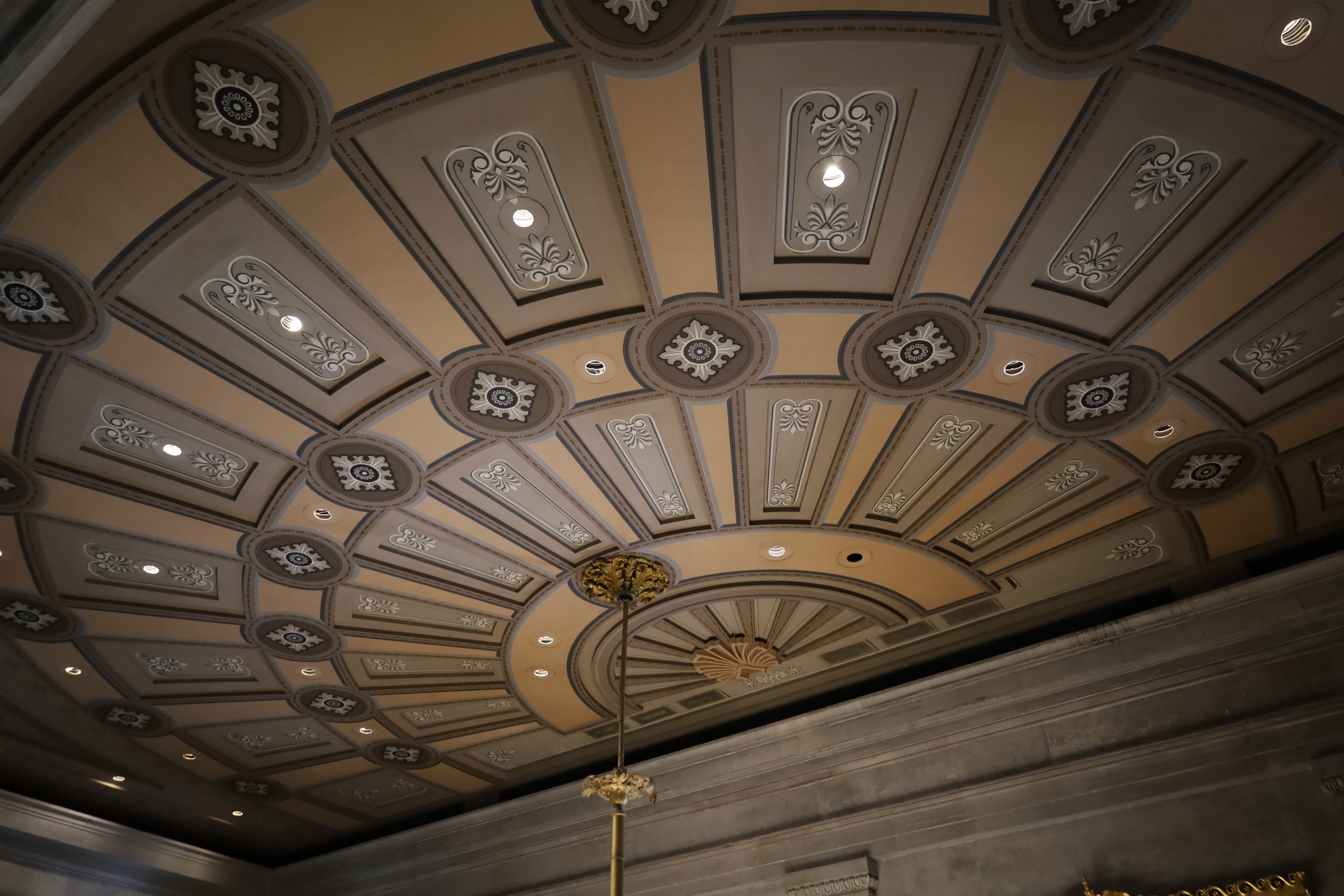
Senate chamber ceiling

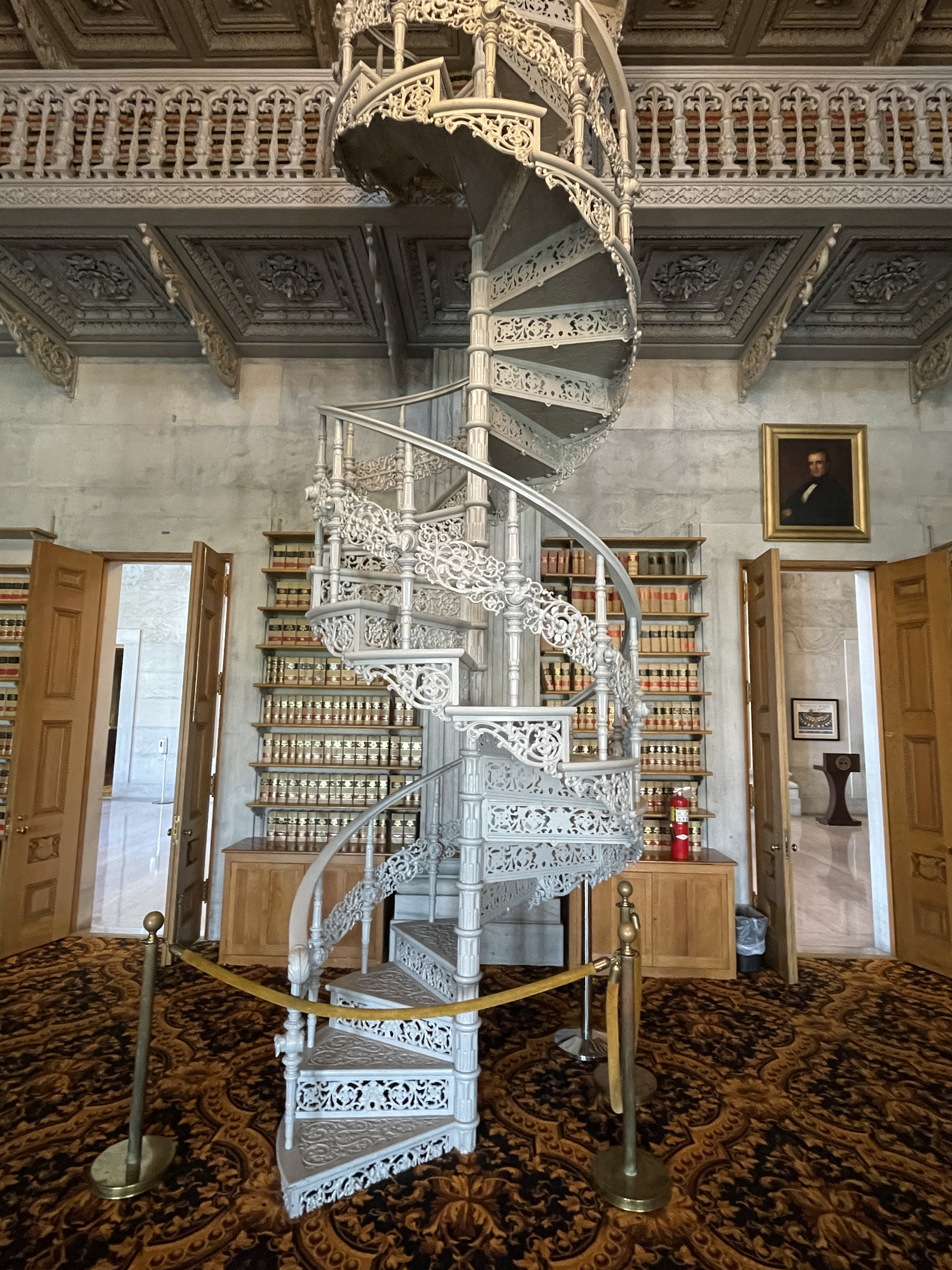
Wrought-iron staircase in the library room

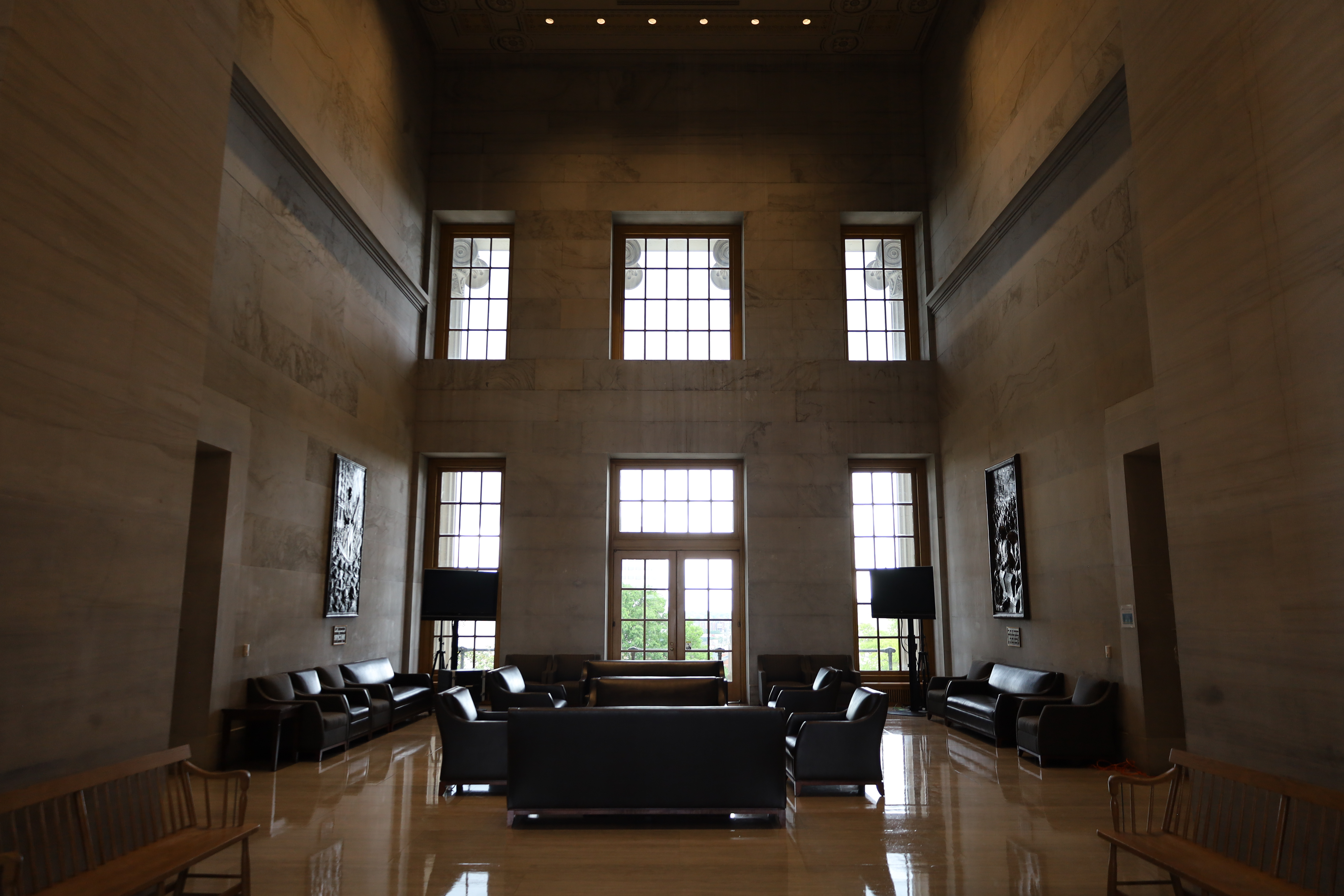
Second floor corridor

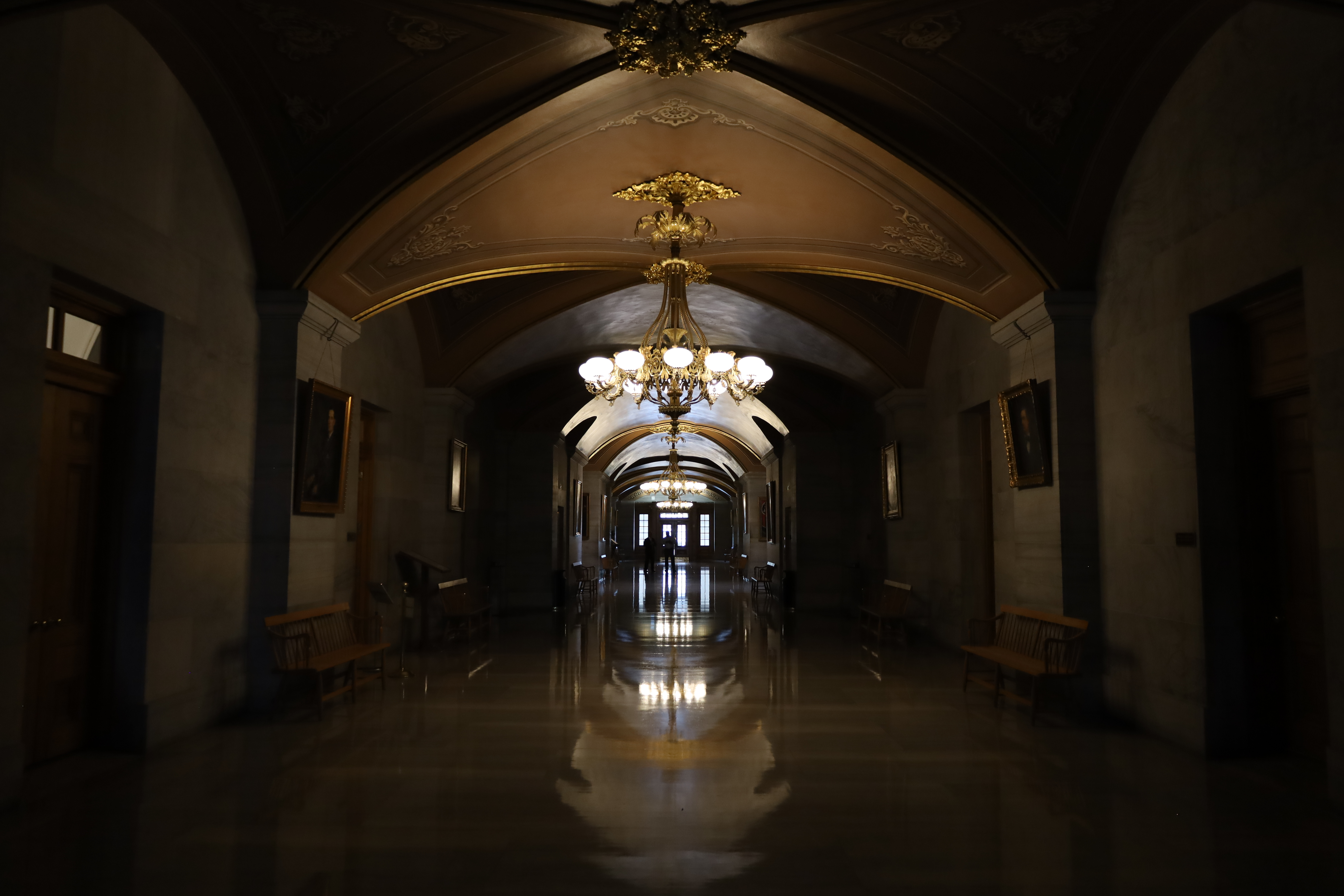
First floor corridor

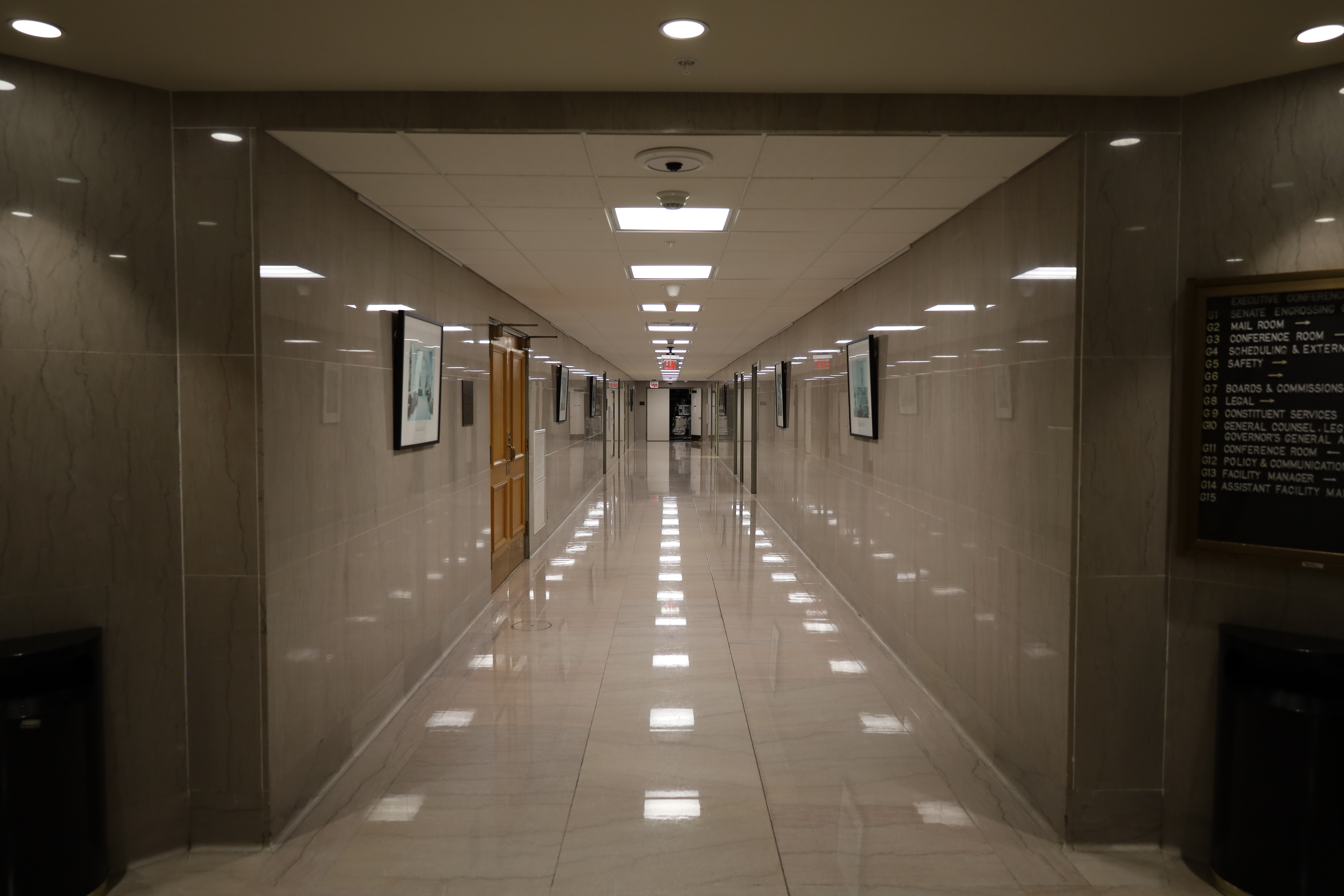
Basement corridor
Commemorative plaques and markers

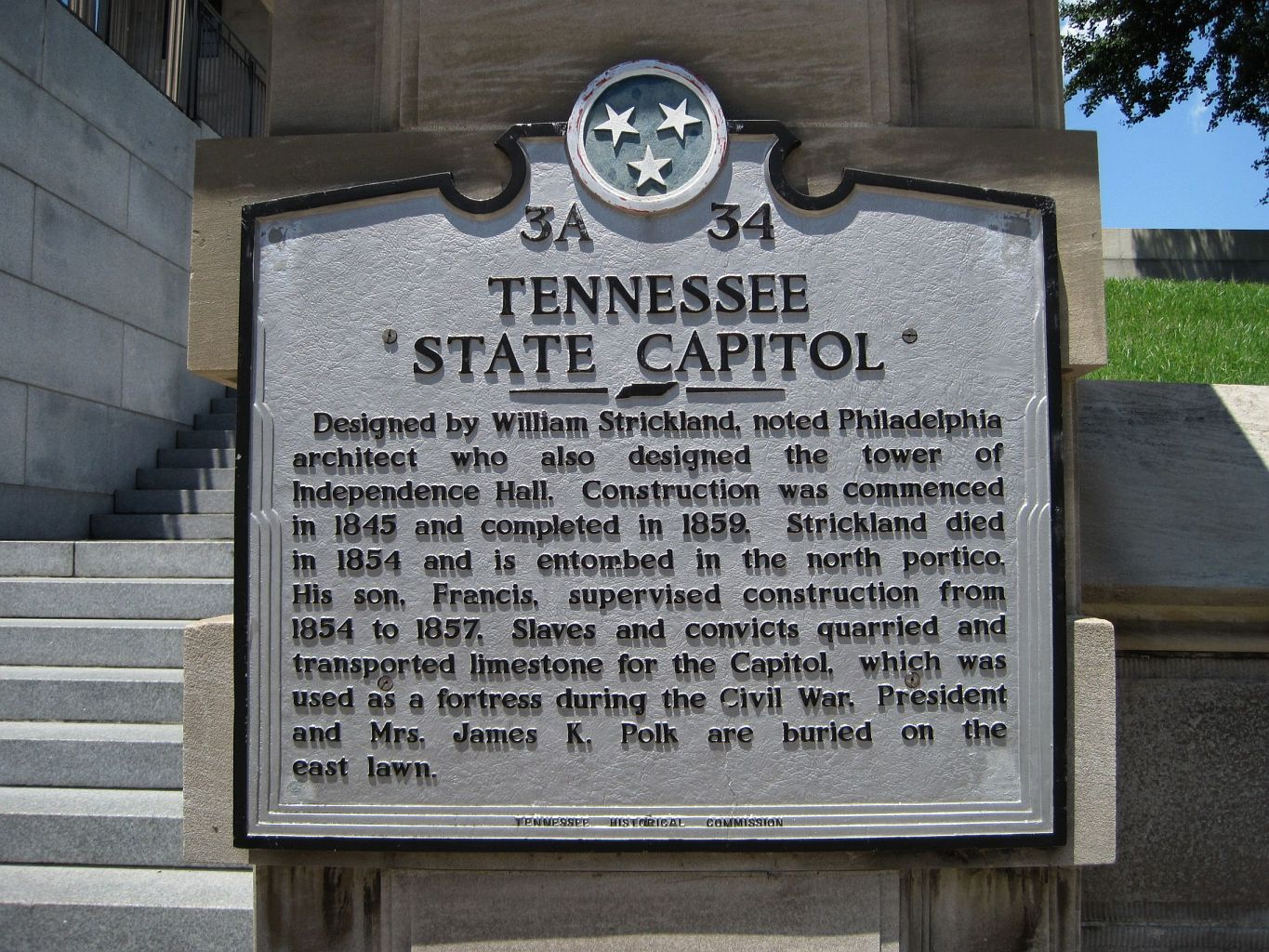
Tennessee Historical Commission historical marker

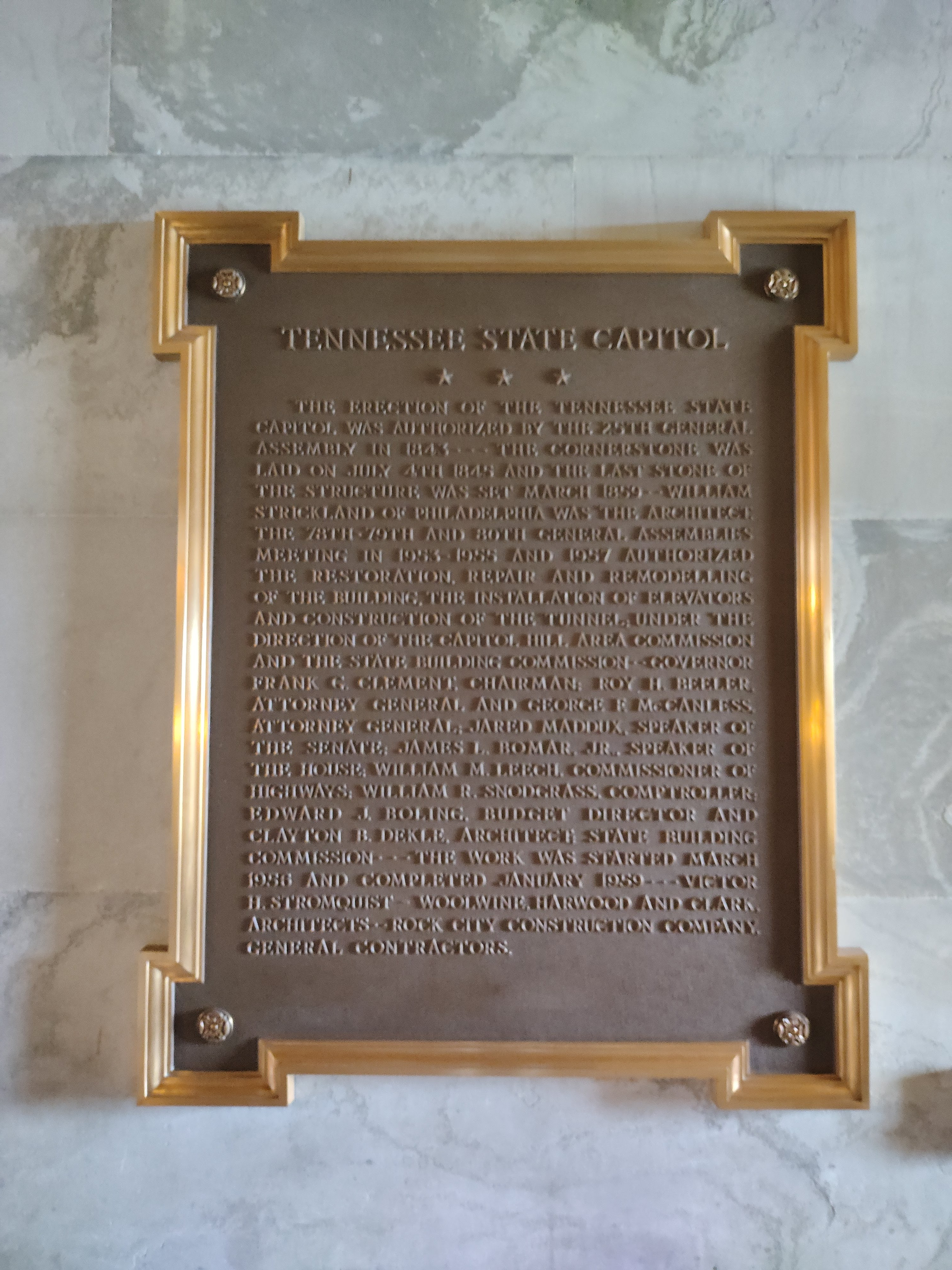
Plaque commemorating 1956-59 restoration

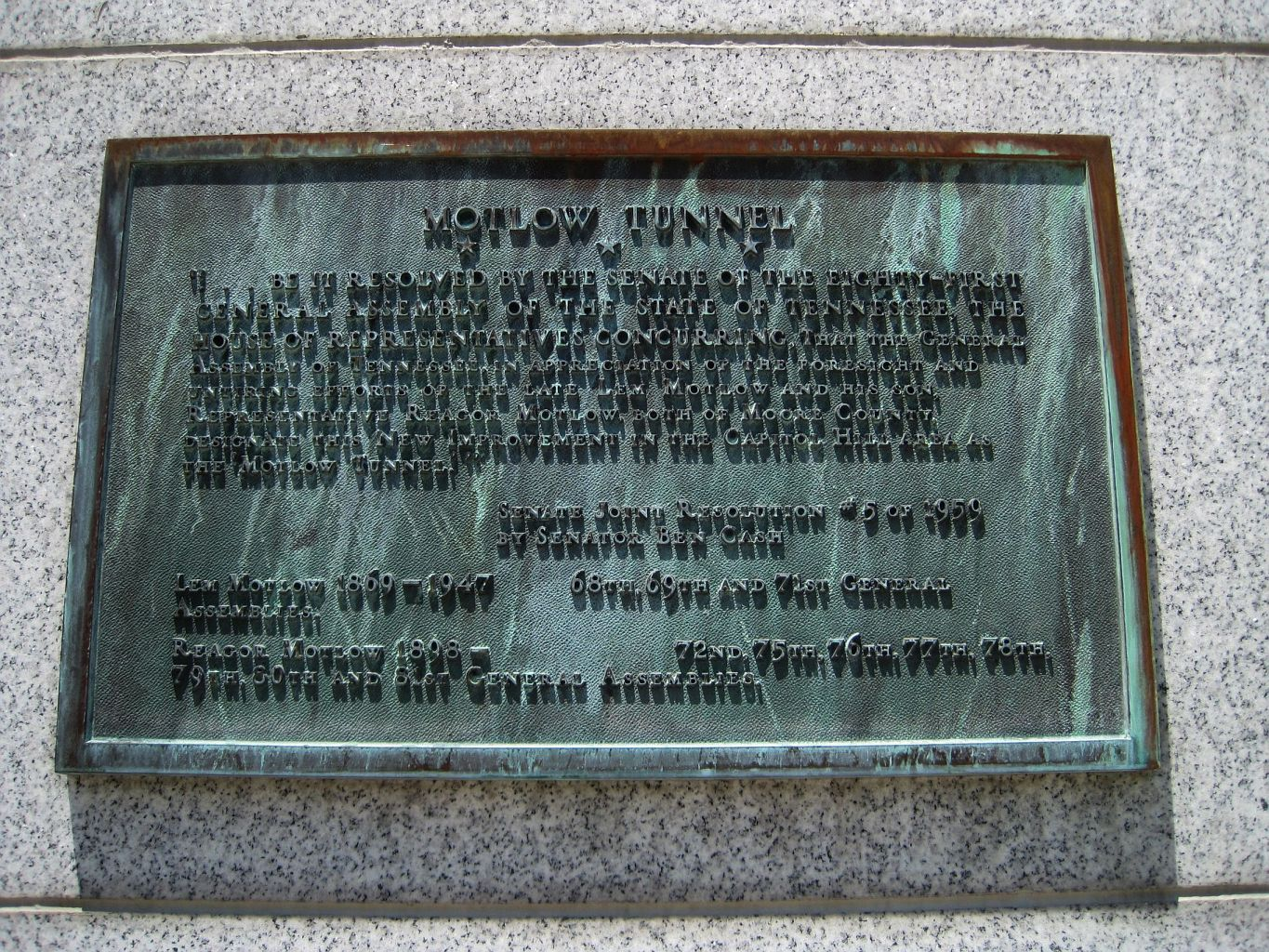
Motlow Tunnel plaque

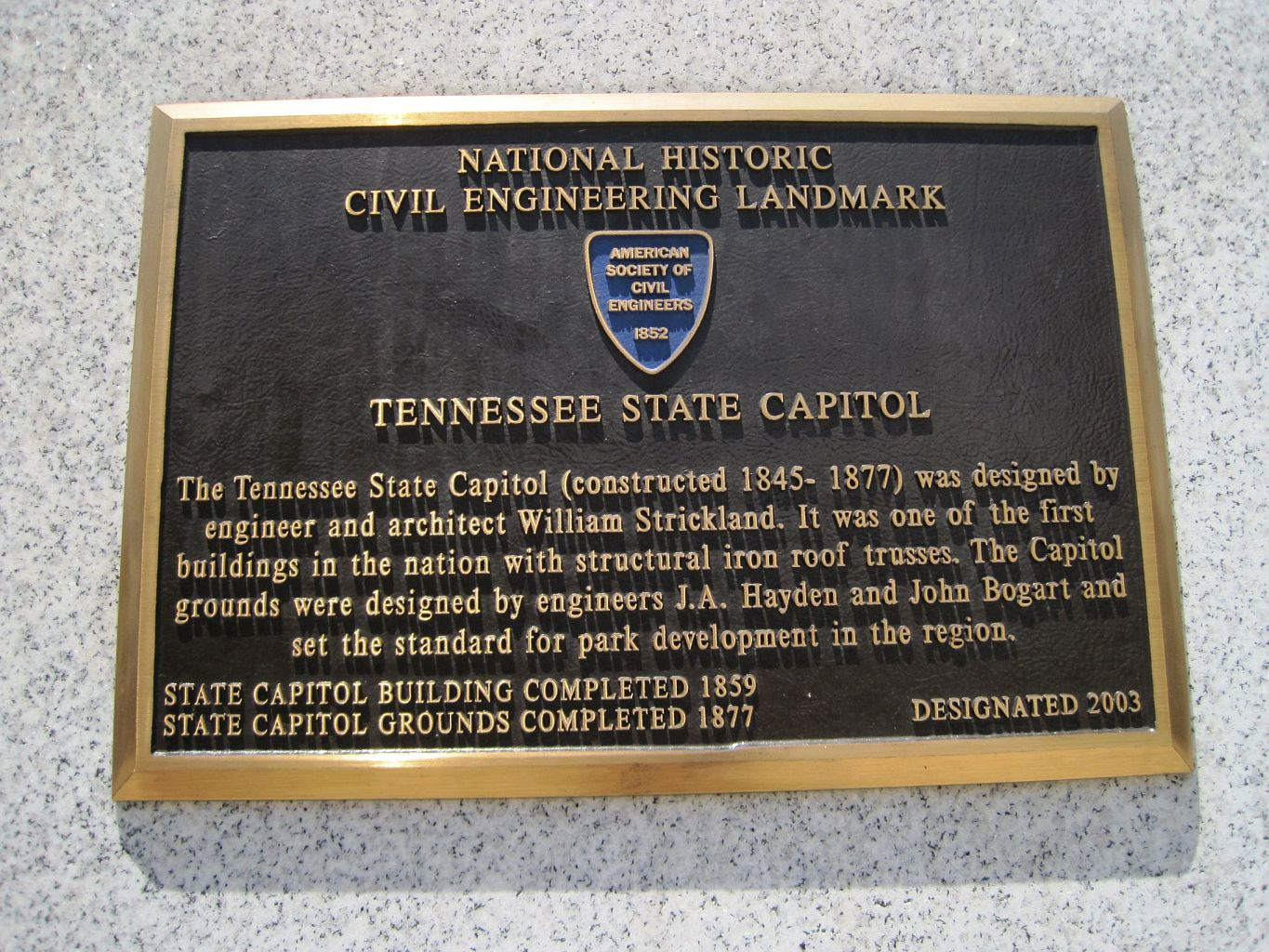
American Society of Civil Engineers plaque

== See also ==
- List of Tennessee General Assemblies
- List of National Historic Landmarks in Tennessee
- List of burial places of presidents and vice presidents of the United States
- National Register of Historic Places listings in Davidson County, Tennessee
