= Tennessee State Capitol artwork, monuments, and memorials =

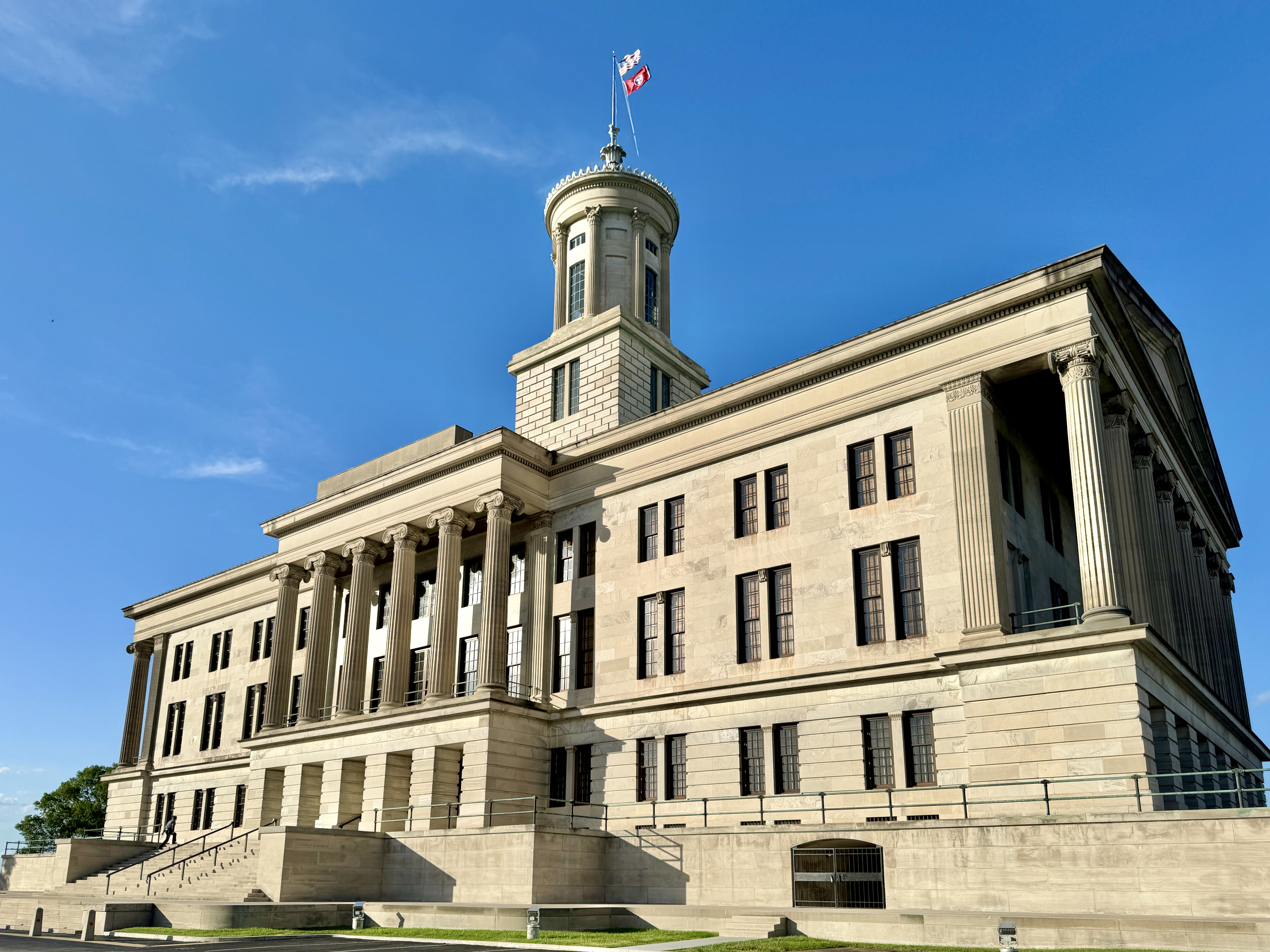
The Tennessee State Capitol pictured in 2024.

The Tennessee State Capitol, the seat of government of the U.S. state of Tennessee in Nashville, is extensively adorned with artwork, monuments, and memorials in the interior and on the grounds. The interior contains portraits and busts of prominent politicians, military leaders, and other influential people. Tennessee state symbols and state historical events are also symbolically portrayed with murals, frescoes, bas-reliefs, and decorative chandeliers. The grounds, which are extensively landscaped, are decorated with statues and monuments honoring prominent Tennesseans, including the three United States Presidents from Tennessee. 11th President James K. Polk and his wife, First Lady Sarah Childress Polk, are entombed on the grounds. William Strickland, the architect of the capitol, and Samuel Morgan, who led the commission that oversaw the capitol's construction, are both entombed in the building's walls. The grounds also have memorials to victims of slavery and the Holocaust, and monuments recognizing important events in both Tennessee and United States history. The Tennessee State Capitol has featured artwork since its construction from 1845 to 1859, and new monuments and memorials have been continuously added ever since. Several pieces of artwork have drawn significant controversy, leading to some removals and relocations.

== Overview and governance ==
Artwork, monuments, and memorials at the Tennessee State Capitol are overseen by the State Capitol Commission (SCC). This agency was created by the Tennessee General Assembly on April 9, 1986, to develop a master plan for preservation and improvements to the capitol, and is under the jurisdiction of the Office of the State Architect. The SCC sets criteria for interior and exterior monumental works, and collaborates with the Tennessee Historical Commission (THC), Tennessee Arts Commission, Tennessee Monuments and Memorials Commission, and other agencies to evaluate new artwork proposals and develop long-term plan for future artwork. New monuments must be approved by the SCC and the State Building Commission. Monuments and memorials at the capitol are generally prohibited from removal or renaming by the Tennessee Heritage Protection Act, which was enacted in 2013. The most recent master plan for monuments at the capitol complex was completed in November 2014.

== Capitol grounds monuments ==
=== Presidents ===
Monuments on the capitol grounds include statues of two of the three Tennesseans who served as President of the United States. 7th president Andrew Jackson is represented by an equestrian statue, sculpted by Clark Mills. Located on the east plaza between the fountains, provisions for this statue were incorporated in New York civil engineer John Bogart's plans for the grounds in 1871. The statue was dedicated on May 20, 1880, as part of Nashville's centennial celebration. This is one of three identical statues produced by Mills, which were reportedly the first equestrian statues in the United States, and were proclaimed an "engineer's delight" because of their challenging design. The artist's proof, two of the others are in Lafayette Square in Washington, D.C., and at Jackson Square in New Orleans. Its temporary wooden base was replaced by a permanent marble pedestal in 1884. 17th president Andrew Johnson is represented with a statue by Knoxville sculptor Jim Gray, dedicated on October 18, 1995.

The second Tennessee president, 11th president James K. Polk, is buried in a tomb on the northeast grounds with his wife, Sarah Childress Polk. Their remains were reinterred here on September 19, 1893, from their Polk Place home in Nashville. In March 2017, the Tennessee Senate approved a resolution considered a "first step" toward relocating the Polks' remains to the family home in Columbia. Such a move would require approval by state lawmakers, the courts, and the Tennessee Historical Commission (THC). A year later, a renewed plan to reinter Polk was defeated by Tennessee lawmakers before being taken up again and approved, via the non-signature of Governor Bill Haslam. The Tennessee Capitol Commission heard arguments over the issue in November 2018, during which they reiterated their opposition to the tomb relocation, and a vote was delayed indefinitely.

Monuments and memorials to U.S. presidents

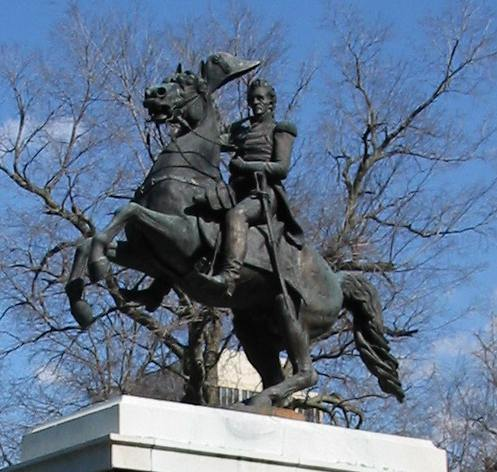
Closeup of the equestrian statue of 7th President Andrew Jackson

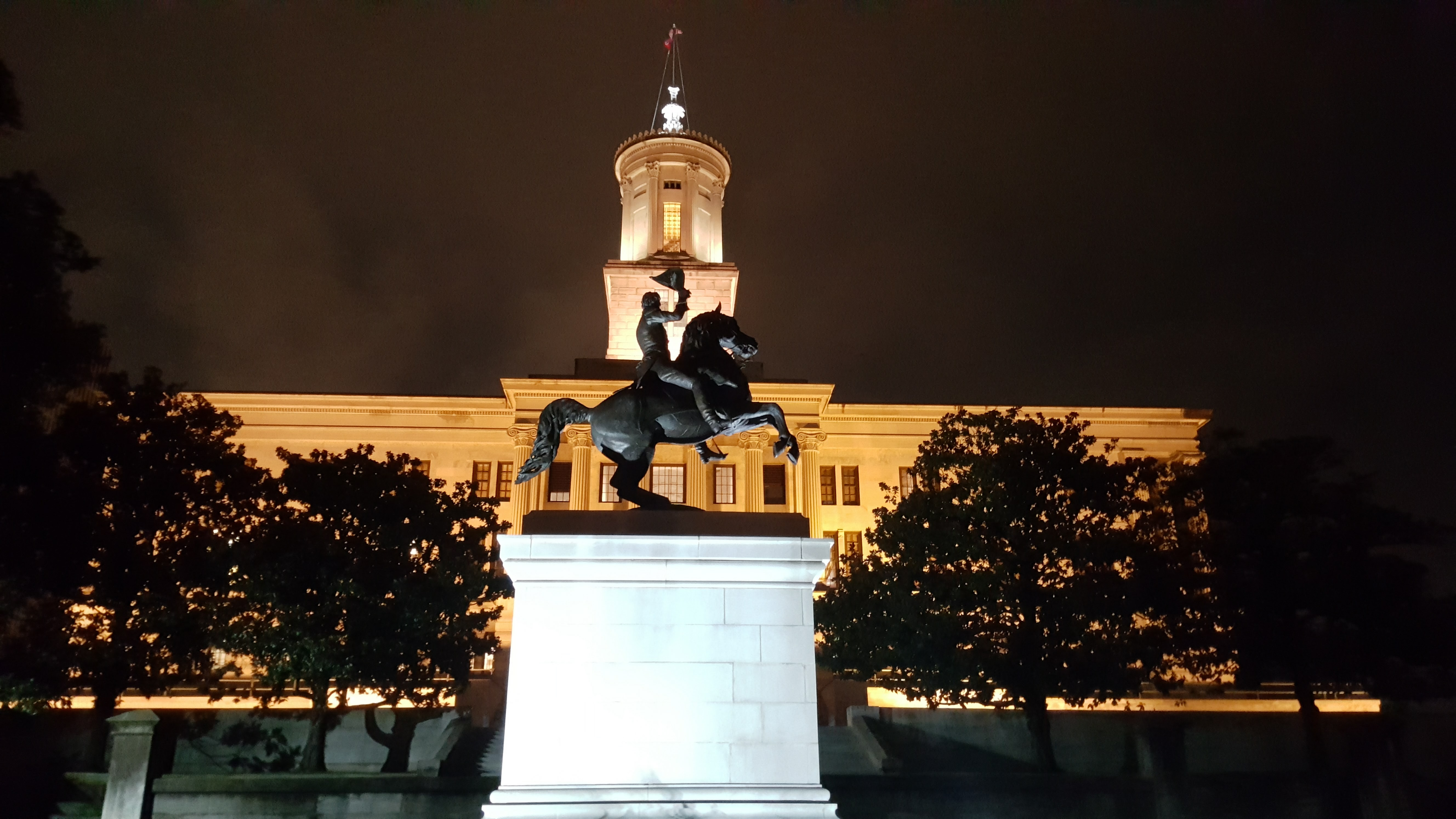
Jackson statue and capitol illuminated at night

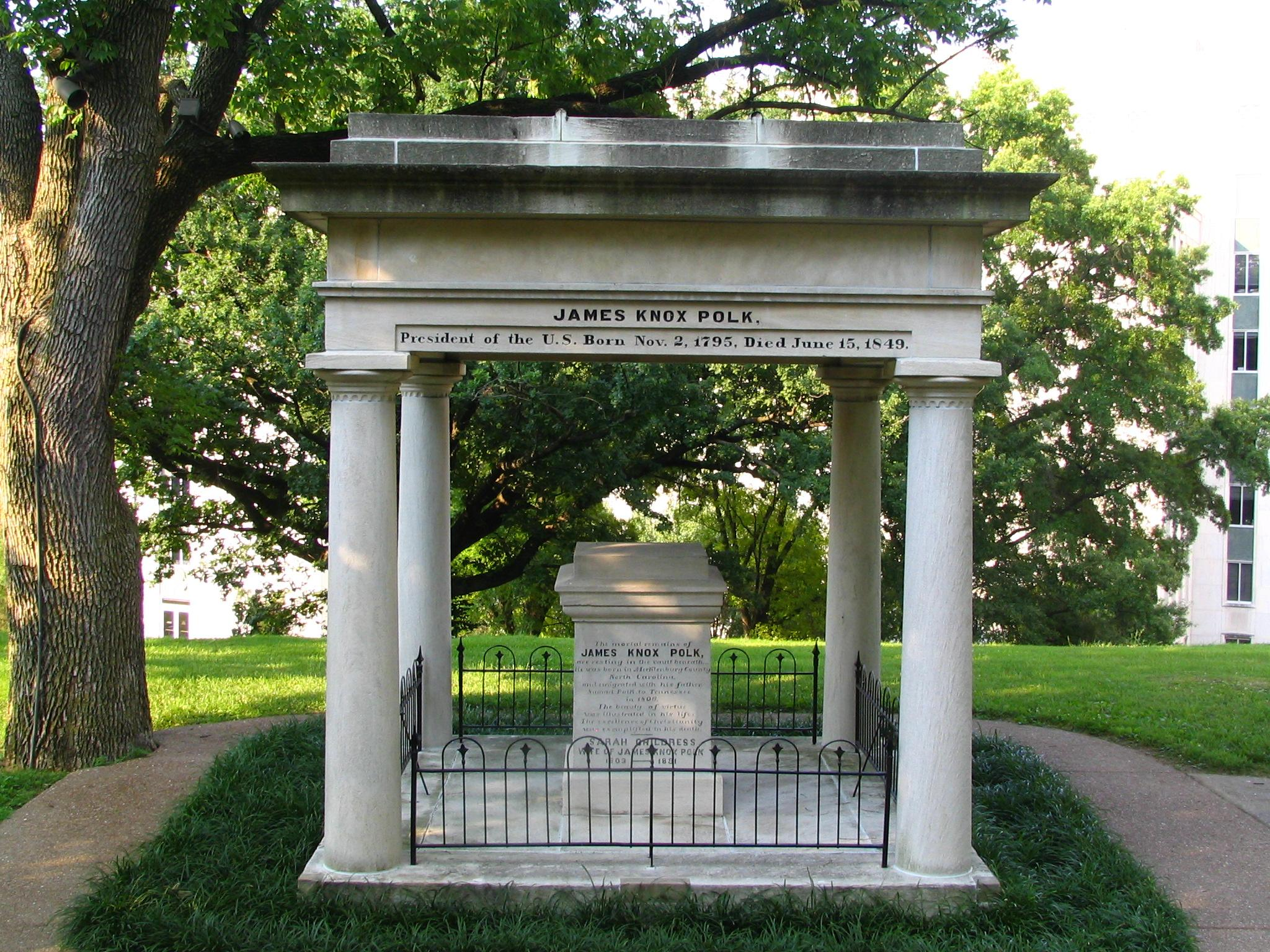
Tomb of 11th President James K. Polk and First Lady Sarah Childress Polk

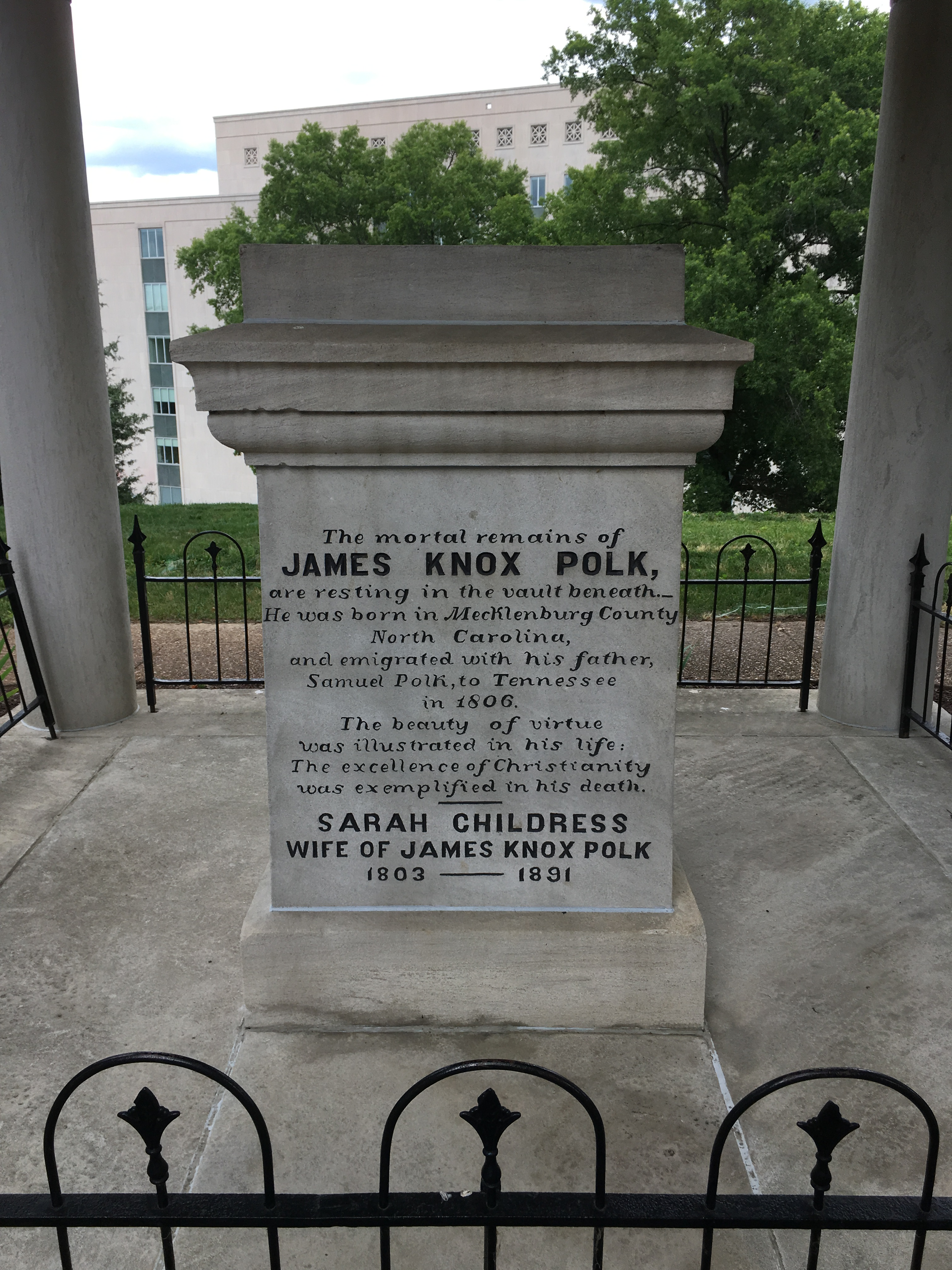
Inscription on Polks' tomb

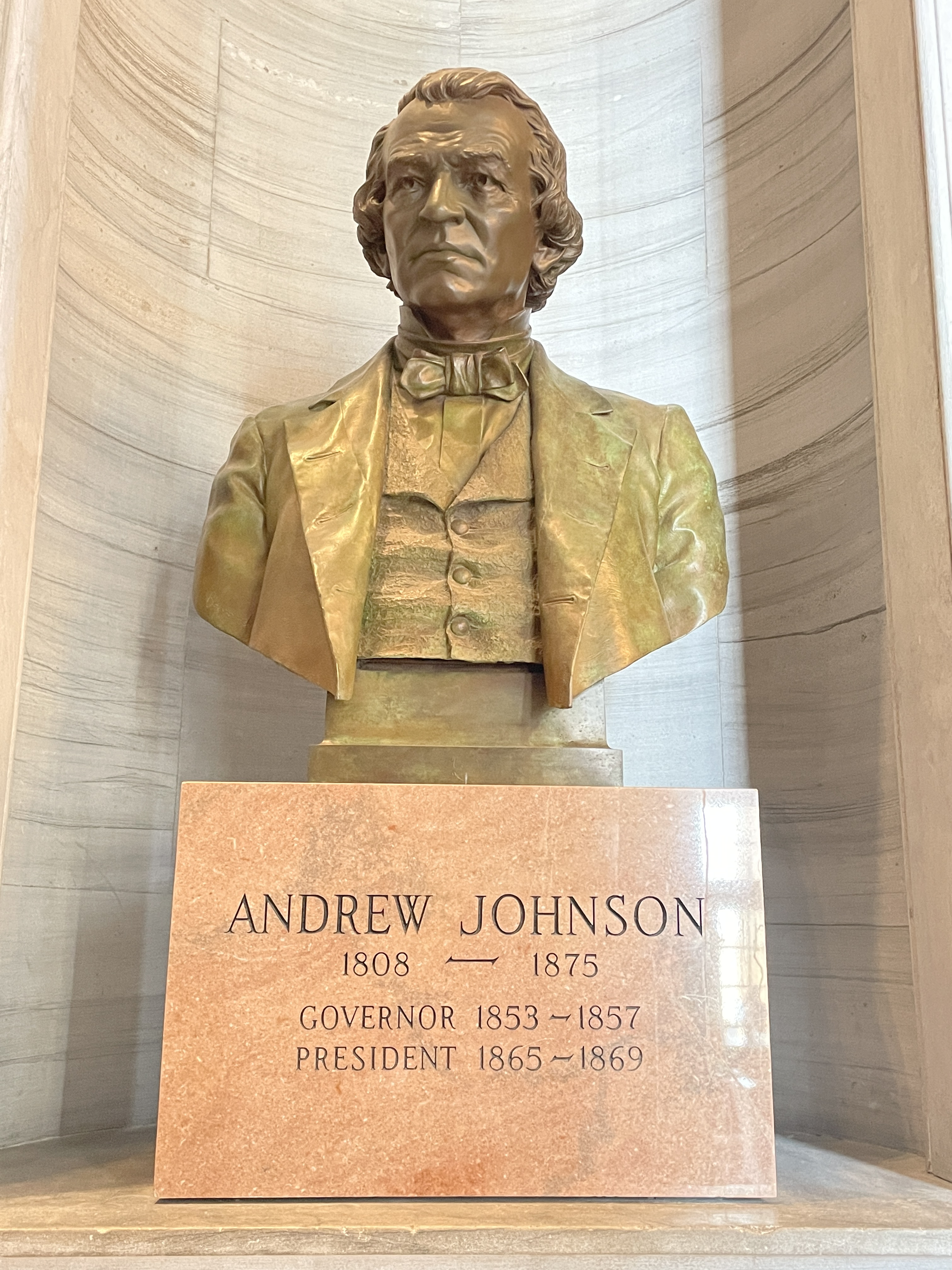
Bust of 17th President Andrew Johnson

=== Other memorials and monuments ===
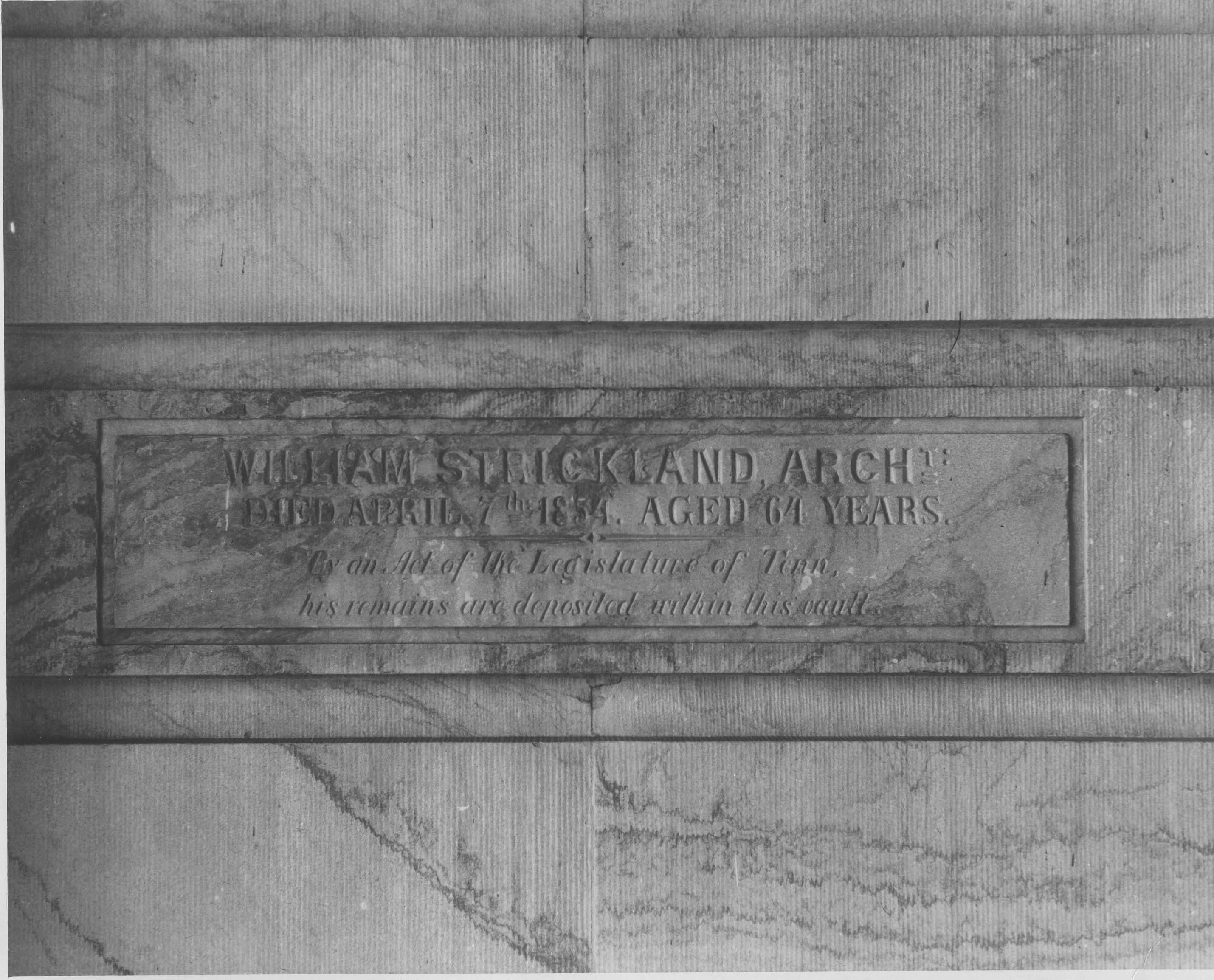
The burial vault of the capitol's architect, William Strickland, in the north wall of the statehouse. The Tennessee State Capitol is the only state capitol building with tombs in its structure or on its grounds.

William Strickland, the architect of the capitol who died in 1854 before its completion, is buried in a vault in the north wall of the building near the northeast corner at the ground level. Strickland designed this tomb the year before his death, and the legislature designated it as his burial place at his request five weeks before he died. The inscription incorrectly states that Strickland died at the age of 64, when he actually lived to be 65. Samuel Morgan, who served on the commission that oversaw the capitol's construction, is buried in a vault near the southeast corner at the ground level. The Tennessee State Capitol is the only state capitol building in the United States with graves in its structure or on its grounds.

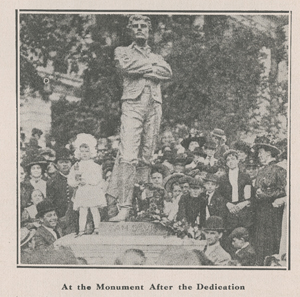
Dedication of the Sam Davis Statue in 1909.

In 1880, a triangular marker honoring the three Tennessee governors surnamed Brown from Giles County was placed on Capitol Hill. In October 1907, a tree and marker were placed on Capitol Hill by the Watauga Chapter of the Daughters of the American Revolution honoring early Tennessee settlers. A statue of Sam Davis called Boy Hero of the Confederacy is on the southwest grounds. It was sculpted by Bucharest-born artist George Julian Zolnay, who was known as the "sculptor of the Confederacy", and was dedicated on April 29, 1909. On July 27, 1927, a triangular time capsule was buried on the grounds by Nashville Council No. 1 of Royal and Select Masons to celebrate the chapter's centennial. It will be opened on July 27, 2027. The United States Geological Survey placed a survey marker on Capitol Hill in 1934. On October 3, 1939, the American Legion Post 5 and American War Mothers placed a marker honoring mothers of American soldiers killed in World War I.

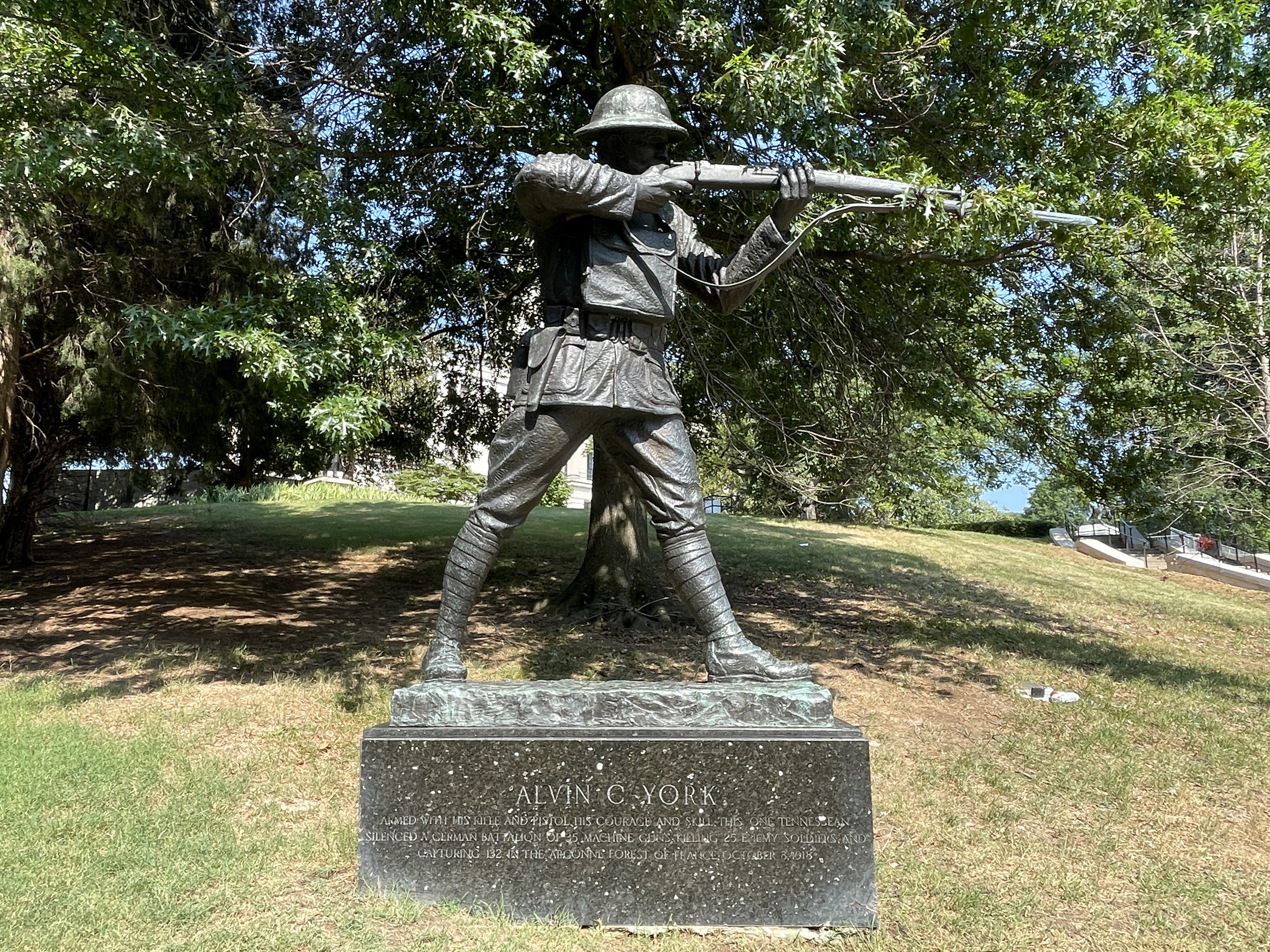
Statue of Sgt. Alvin C. York by Felix de Weldon.

A replica of the Liberty Bell was presented to Tennessee in 1950 by the U.S. Treasury Department as part of their Independence Savings Bond Drive. It first began touring the state on May 22, 1950, and was placed in the east gardens in a ceremony on June 30. (Note: A common misconception is that this replica was installed in 1976 to commemorate the United States Bicentennial.) A statue of World War I Medal of Honor recipient Sgt. Alvin C. York, who was from Pall Mall, Tennessee, sculpted by Austrian American sculptor Felix de Weldon, was unveiled on the southeast corner on December 13, 1968. On September 10, 1969, the United Daughters of the Confederacy placed a plaque in the east garden to commemorate the 75th anniversary of their founding in Nashville. The Colonial Dames of America placed a tree and marker in 1975, commemorating the 200th anniversary of George Washington's acceptance of command of the Continental Army. In April 1976, the Freedom Tree was planted in the east garden to honor the 1,300 American service members missing in action in the Vietnam War. A time capsule was buried by Governor Ray Blanton in 1978, but its location is unknown. The Charles Warterfield Reliquary is a group of broken limestone columns and fragments removed and saved from the capitol during the 1950s restoration, located near the belvedere overlook on the north slope. They were installed in 1995 and designated in memory of Warterfield, an architect who led the capitol's restoration projects, on August 8, 1999, eight months after his death. Additional reliquary fragments are at Bicentennial Capitol Mall State Park.

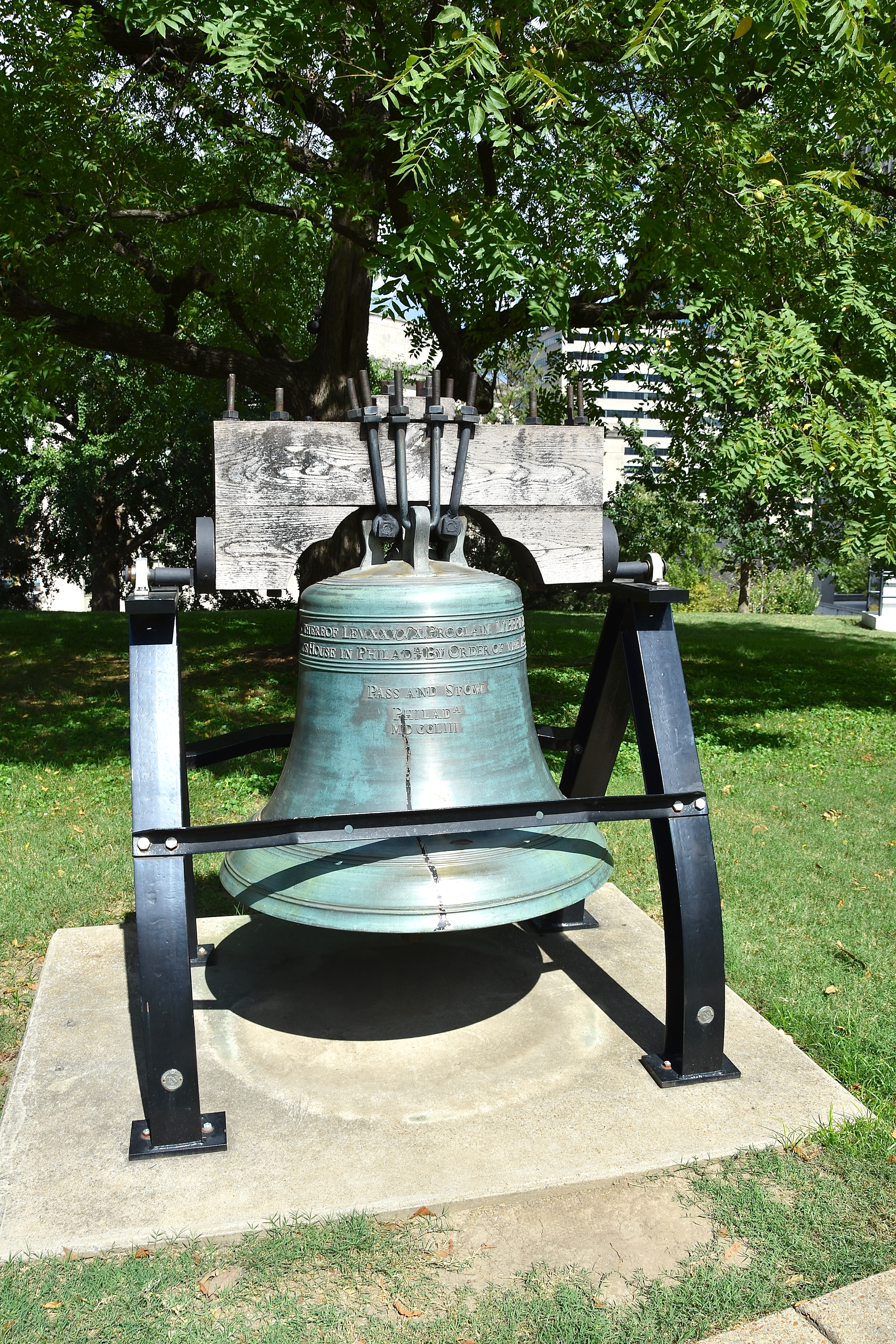
Liberty Bell replica.

On January 16, 1984, Governor Lamar Alexander planted a tulip poplar, Tennessee's state tree, in memory of Martin Luther King Jr. in a ceremony attended by other state and local officials. The Tennessee Holocaust Memorial is located on the southeast corner of the grounds, and was dedicated on May 5, 1986, during the annual Days of Remembrance of the Victims of the Holocaust. It consists of a marble marker with a bronze plaque and six native Tennessee cedars that memorialize the six million Jews murdered in the Holocaust. The Seeds of the Past and Present Tree was planted by Tennessee Civil War Trails on top of the northeast hill to commemorate Tennessee's bicentennial in 1996. On April 21, 1999, a tree was planted near the top of the north lawn by the Tennessee Nursery and Landscape Association in memory of State Senator Tommy Burks, who was assassinated the previous year. In July 1999, the state legislature's Black Caucus dedicated a memorial to Africans during the Middle Passage at the southwest corner that consists of a black granite block and a scarlet oak representing the "strength and resilience of people of African descent".

A monument to unborn children, including those lost to abortion, was approved by the legislature in 2018. The "Monument to the Unborn" was dedicated on June 24, 2026, the fourth anniversary of the Dobbs v. Jackson Women's Health Organization case that ended the nationwide right to abortion. On November 12, 2026, a larger-than-life statue of frontiersman Davy Crockett by Jamie Lester was unveiled above the Motlow Tunnel overlooking War Memorial Plaza, replacing the area where the statue of Edward W. Carmack once stood.

== Interior artwork and monuments ==
=== State Library room ===
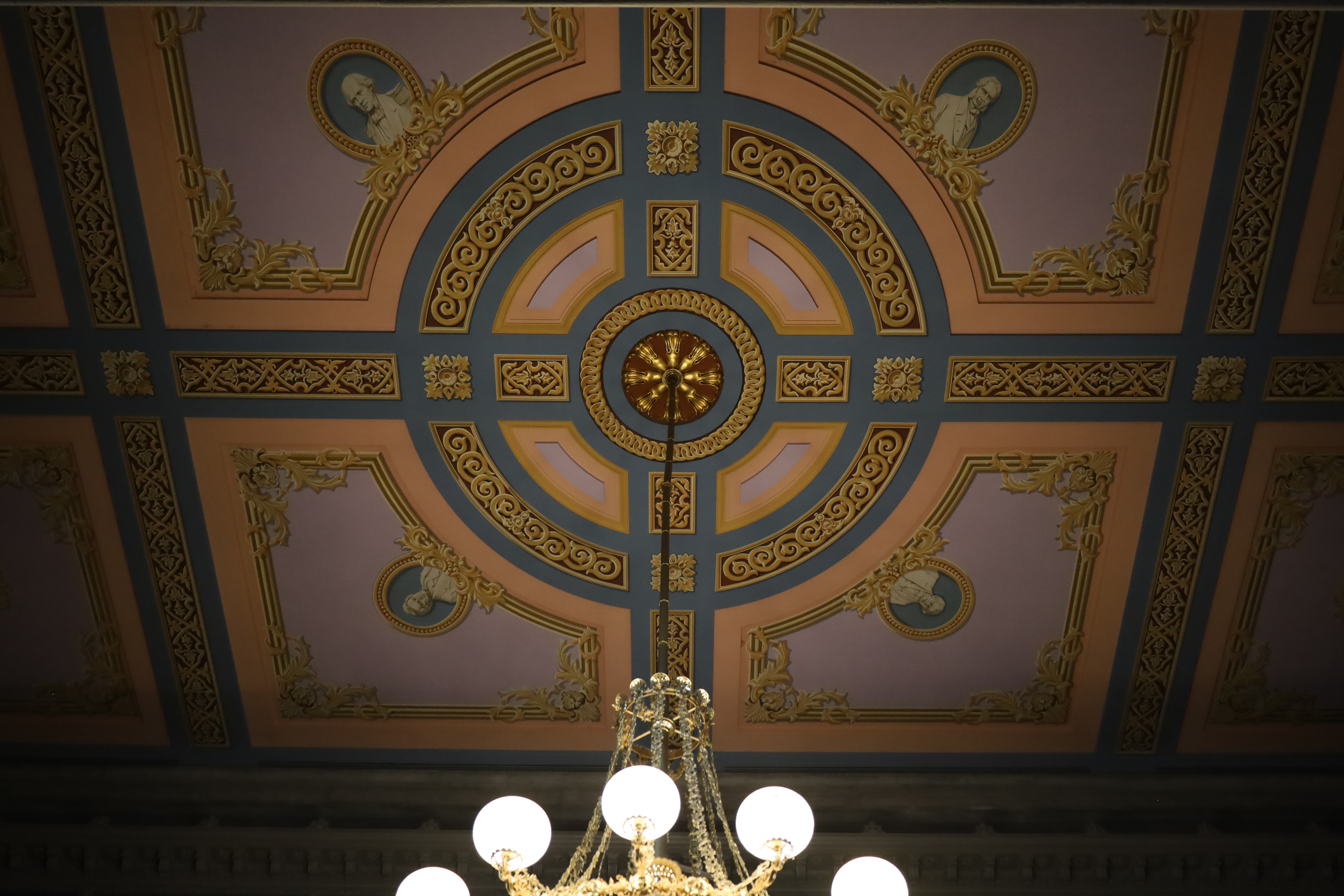
The ceiling of the State Library room is adorned with portraits of various prominent people, painted in 1857.

The State Library room is widely regarded as the most beautifully decorated room in the Tennessee State Capitol. Completed after Strickland's death, the room incorporates Victorian architecture, in contrast to the Greek Revival architecture of the rest of the building. The ceiling is adorned with portraits of various prominent people. These are first state geologist Gerard Troost, historian William H. Prescott, jurist James Kent, geologist James Priestly, University of Tennessee president Charles Coffin, University of Nashville president Philip Lindsley, Confederate naval officer Matthew Fontaine Maury, and poet Henry Wadsworth Longfellow. They were painted by German-born artists Theodore Knoch and John Schleicher, who had worked with Strickland on some of his previous projects, and completed in late 1857. The lacey wrought-iron spiral staircase and balconies in the library are extensively decorated, and were intended to be both artistic and practical. This ironwork was fabricated by Wood and Perot of Philadelphia, who also fabricated railings elsewhere in the capitol. The firm hired "a German artist of great ability as well as great reputation in Prussia, who is desirous of exhibiting his skill in this country". Installed between July and December 1859, this ironwork was part of the last element in the initial construction of the state capitol building to be completed.

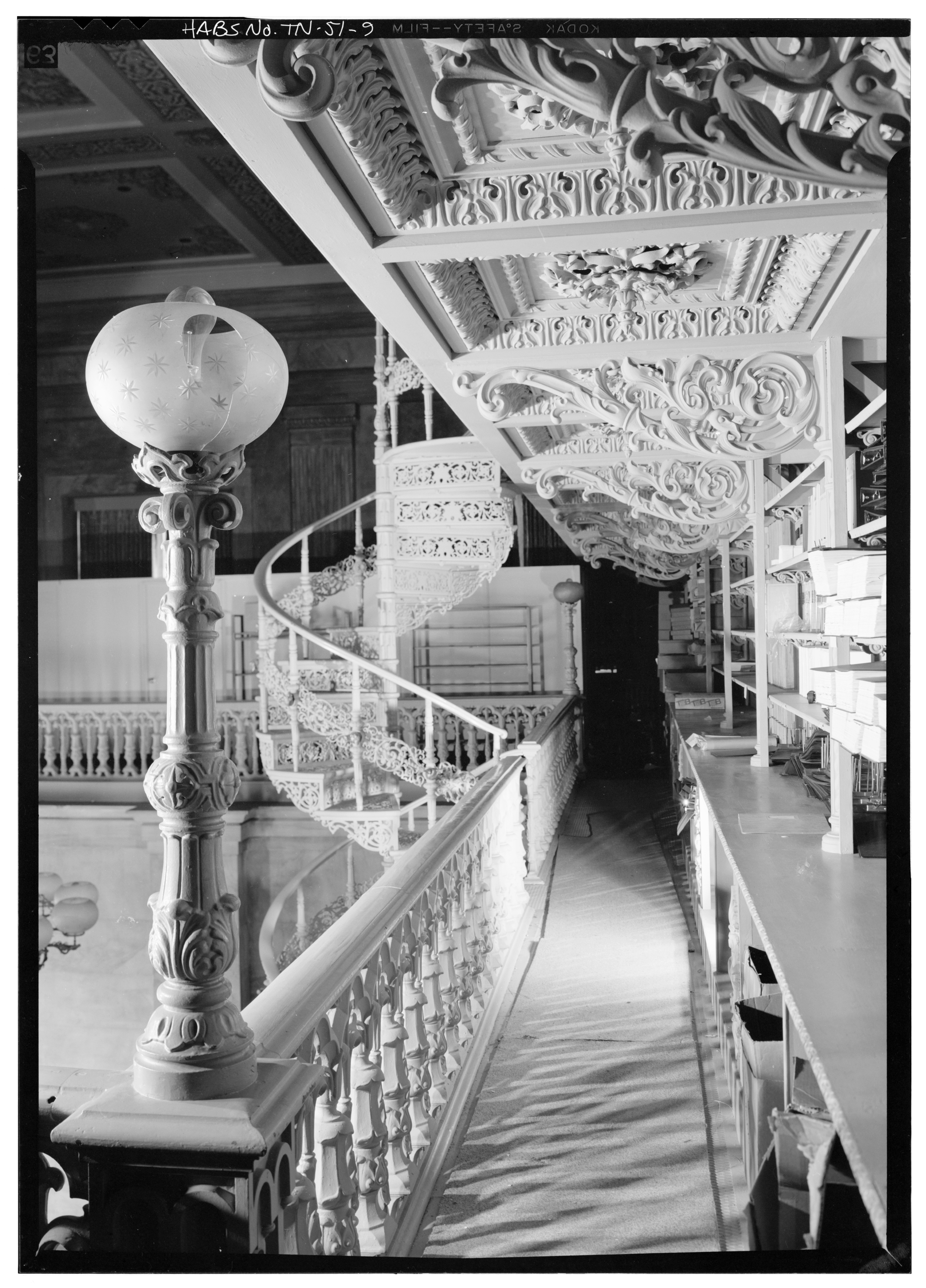
Closeup of the decorative ironwork on the library balconies in 1970.

Alternating designs of bronze domestic and wild boar heads are positioned below the handrails on the staircase. The undersides of the cantilevered balconies are patterned in squares outlined with flowerlike figures. The center of each square has a rosette supported by wrought iron brackets that extend 8 inches (20 cm) into the wall, surrounded by a light cast-iron railing. These were reportedly designed by a French artisan chosen specifically for this work. The second balcony's balustrade is embellished by 23 medallions with gold bronze or black glazed backgrounds depicting important statesmen or literary figures; only five are Tennesseans. 18 of the medallion figures were already held in stock by Wood and Perot; they were incorporated into the railings' design by the building commission upon suggestion by the company during the planning and construction of the room. The five Tennesseans were chosen by the commissioners. On the northeast side, from left to right, the medallions depict William Shakespeare, (Note: Spelled "William Shakspeare" on the medallion) Joseph Addison, Dante Alighieri, U.S. Senator Ephraim H. Foster, Sir Walter Scott, Lord Byron, George Washington, Benjamin Franklin, and Thomas Jefferson. The central balcony depicts Patrick Henry, Andrew Jackson, Daniel Webster, Henry Clay, John Milton, James K. Polk, and Washington Irving. The south railing has William H. Prescott, U.S. attorney general and senator Felix Grundy, Tennessee governor William Carroll, senator Hugh Lawson White, U.S. Supreme Court Justice Joseph Story, senator John Bell, and John C. Calhoun.

=== Other interior frescoes and murals ===
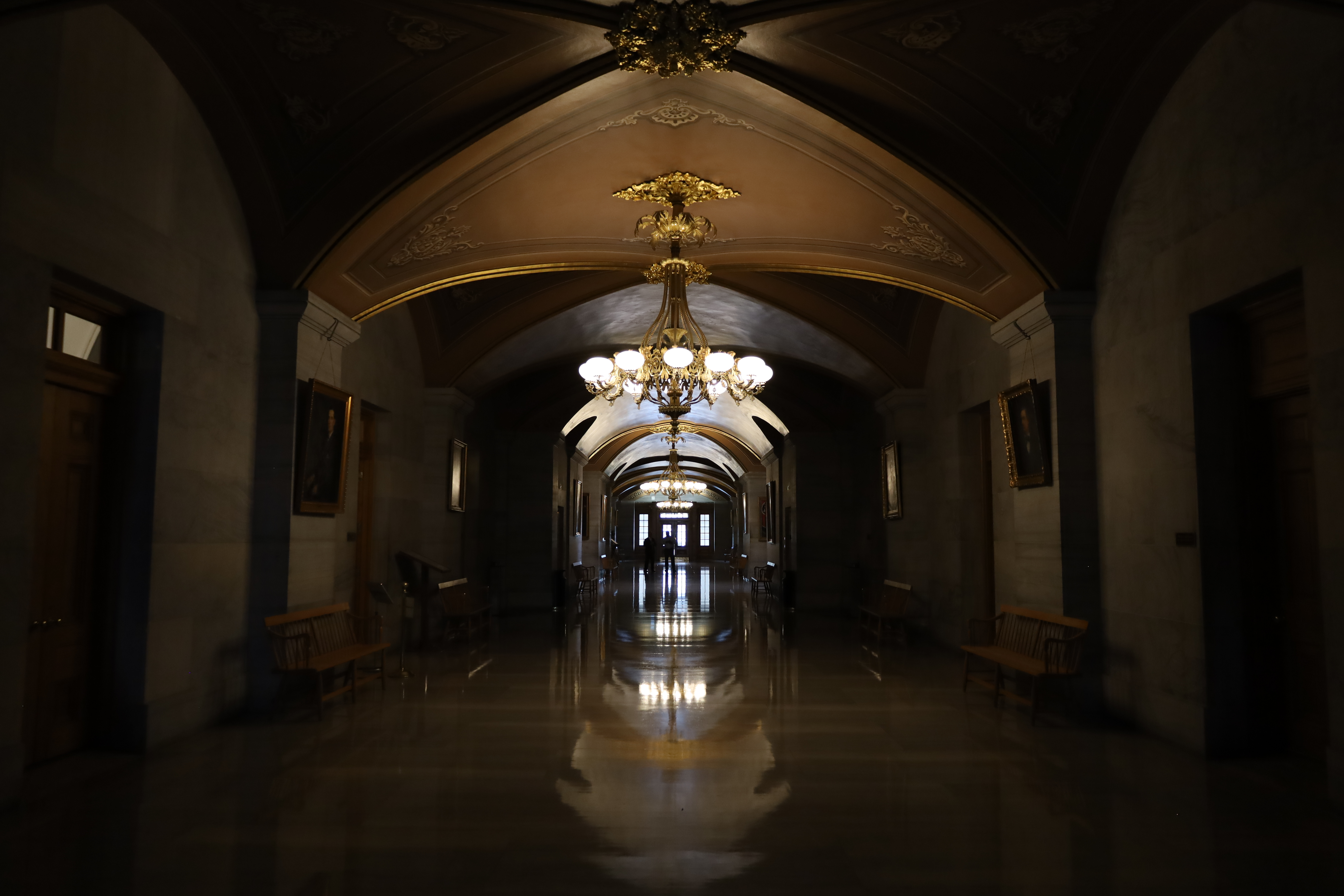
The first floor, or executive floor, is decorated with several portraits.

The ceiling in the center of the first floor where the halls cross, sometimes called a rotunda, is frescoed with four paintings by Schleicher and Knoch around 1858. The first one is titled "Westward Expansion", and represents early settlement of Tennessee by pioneers from east of the Appalachian Mountains. This fresco is surmounted by the Ancient Greek Muses of Literature, Sculpture, Music, and Painting. Another fresco depicts a bald eagle, a national symbol of the United States, surrounded by 31 stars that represent the number of U.S. states at the time. Another painting depicts female personifications of liberty and justice. The last fresco is of a design, similar to that found on the state seal, with a plow, bundle of wheat, a cotton plant, and a riverboat that represent the state motto, "Agriculture and Commerce". (Note: The order of the representations of "agriculture" and "commerce" are opposite those on the state seal.) Above the riverboat are the Roman numerals XVI that signify Tennessee as the 16th state admitted to the Union.

The governor's reception room features 11 realist-style murals depicting major events from early Tennessee history. They were commissioned by the Federal Art Project of the Works Progress Administration, designed by artist George Davidson, and painted by Armenian American artist Jirayr Zorthian in 1938. The first mural depicts early Native American life in Tennessee, followed by a painting of Spanish conquistador Hernando de Soto's expeditions through the state. The next two paintings depict early French and British forts, respectively. These are historically interpreted to be of the French Fort Prudhomme on the Mississippi River and the British Fort Loudoun on the Little Tennessee River. The fifth mural depicts settlers of the Watauga Association, the first permanent European settlement in Tennessee. The early Cumberland River settlements, including the founding of Nashville, are portrayed in the next mural. The Battle of the Bluffs at Fort Nashborough is depicted in the seventh painting, and the signing of the Cumberland Compact is represented by the eighth. The ninth mural represents early Tennessee agriculture, with Andrew Jackson and his The Hermitage plantation. The tenth mural depicts a riverboat loading to symbolize early Tennessee commerce, and the final mural portrays Nashville around 1855 with the capitol building under construction. The ninth and tenth murals also represent Tennessee's official state motto "Agriculture and Commerce".

An 8-by-6-foot (2.4 by 1.8 m) painting called The Pride of Tennessee by first Tennessee artist-in-residence Michael Sloan hangs in the Supreme Court chamber. It was commissioned by Governor Ned McWherter and the Tennessee Historical Commission as the official painting for the state's bicentennial. It depicts 11 historical figures from Tennessee over a landscape representing the state's three Grand Divisions and the state capitol building. From left to right, the painting portrays Secretary of State Cordell Hull, musician and "Father of the Blues" W. C. Handy, women's suffrage activist Anne Dallas Dudley, James K. Polk, Alvin C. York, Andrew Jackson, Andrew Johnson, journalist and civil rights activist Ida B. Wells, Davy Crockett, Revolutionary War soldier and first Tennessee governor John Sevier, and Cherokee neographer and polymath Sequoyah. McWherter unveiled the painting on June 1, 1990, Tennessee's 194th anniversary of statehood, as part of a ceremony marking the start of the state's bicentennial celebration.

=== Portraits, busts, and bas-reliefs ===
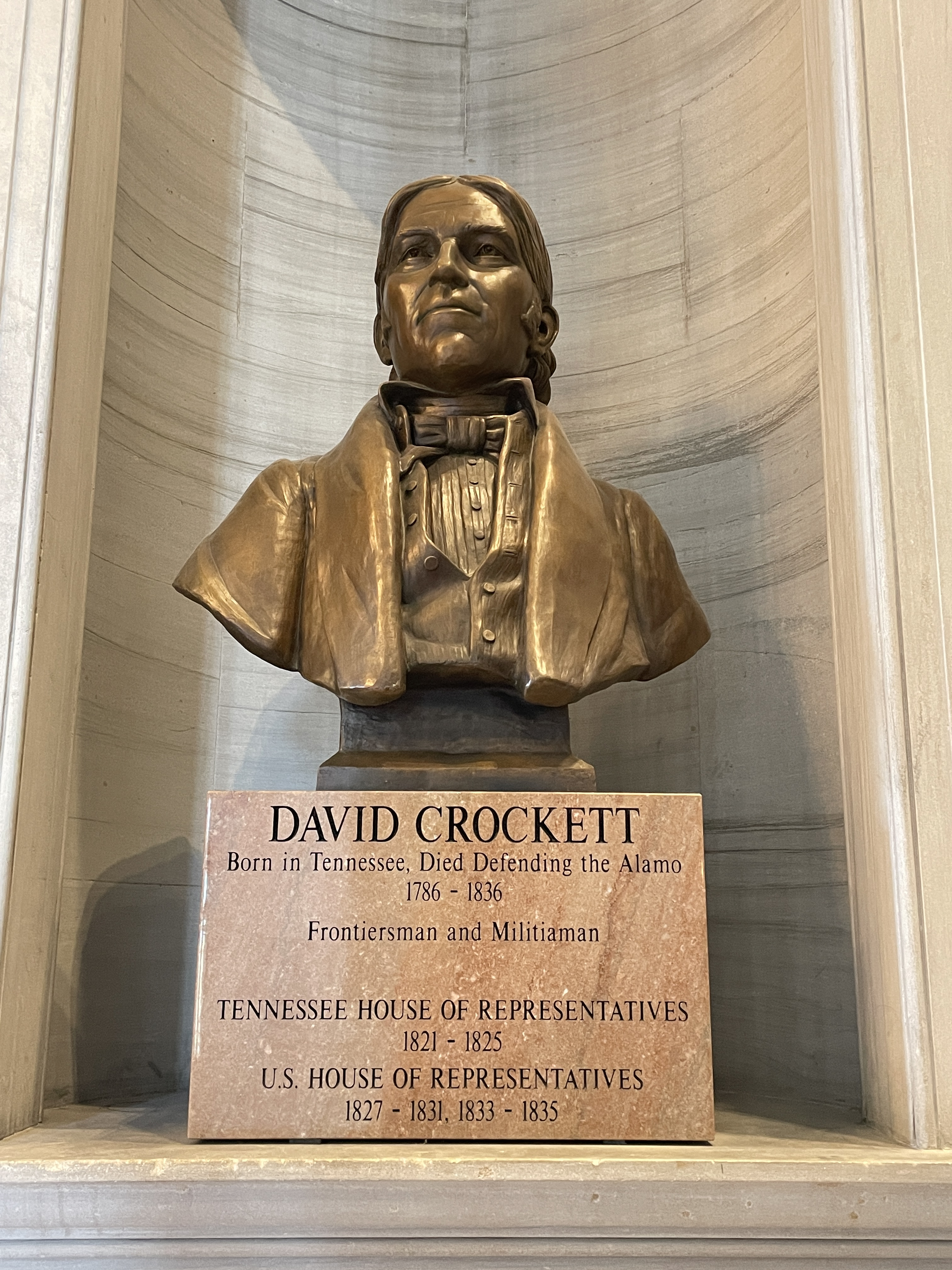
Bust of frontiersman Davy Crockett by Antonio Tobias Mendez.

The first floor hallway contains portraits of Strickland and Morgan, the three Tennessee presidents, and several Tennessee governors. Traditionally, portraits of the last four governors are displayed. Portraits of each governor and Tennessee president and several senators, congressmen, military leaders, and civic leaders were displayed in the library room until 1953, when the library moved to its new building.

The interior of the capitol has several busts of prominent politicians and other influential figures. Most of these are on the second floor, and several are placed in alcoves in the second-floor hallways. In 1932, a bust of George Washington was donated by the National Society of Colonial Dames to commemorate his 200th birth anniversary. A bust of Andrew Jackson sculpted by Belle Kinney Scholz was presented by the Ladies Hermitage Association on January 8, 1933; (Note: This was the 118th anniversary of the Battle of New Orleans) it was later relocated to the Tennessee Performing Arts Center. Busts of Governors Robert Love Taylor and Alfred A. Taylor, who were brothers, were sculpted by Mary Hooper Donelson and placed in the second-floor hallway in 1935; they were relocated to the basement sometime in the 1980s. A statue of World War I Admiral Albert Gleaves was sculpted by Scholz. It was funded by the Treasury Section of Fine Arts, another New Deal arts program, and unveiled on Armistice Day, November 11, 1939. A second bust of Jackson was sculpted by Puryear Mims and placed in the main hallway in 1941. A bust of Cordell Hull by Bryant Baker was dedicated on February 21, 1945, and installed in the library chamber. On May 30, 1946, portraits of Union rear admiral Samuel P. Carter and World War I rear admiral Charles St. John Butler by Eleanor McAdoo Wiley were dedicated during the state's sesquicentennial celebration. The next day, busts of Union Admiral David Farragut by Scholz, and Matthew Fontaine Maury by Frederick William Sievers were unveiled in the second-floor hallway. These were part of a proposed "Hall of Naval Heroes" that never came to fruition.

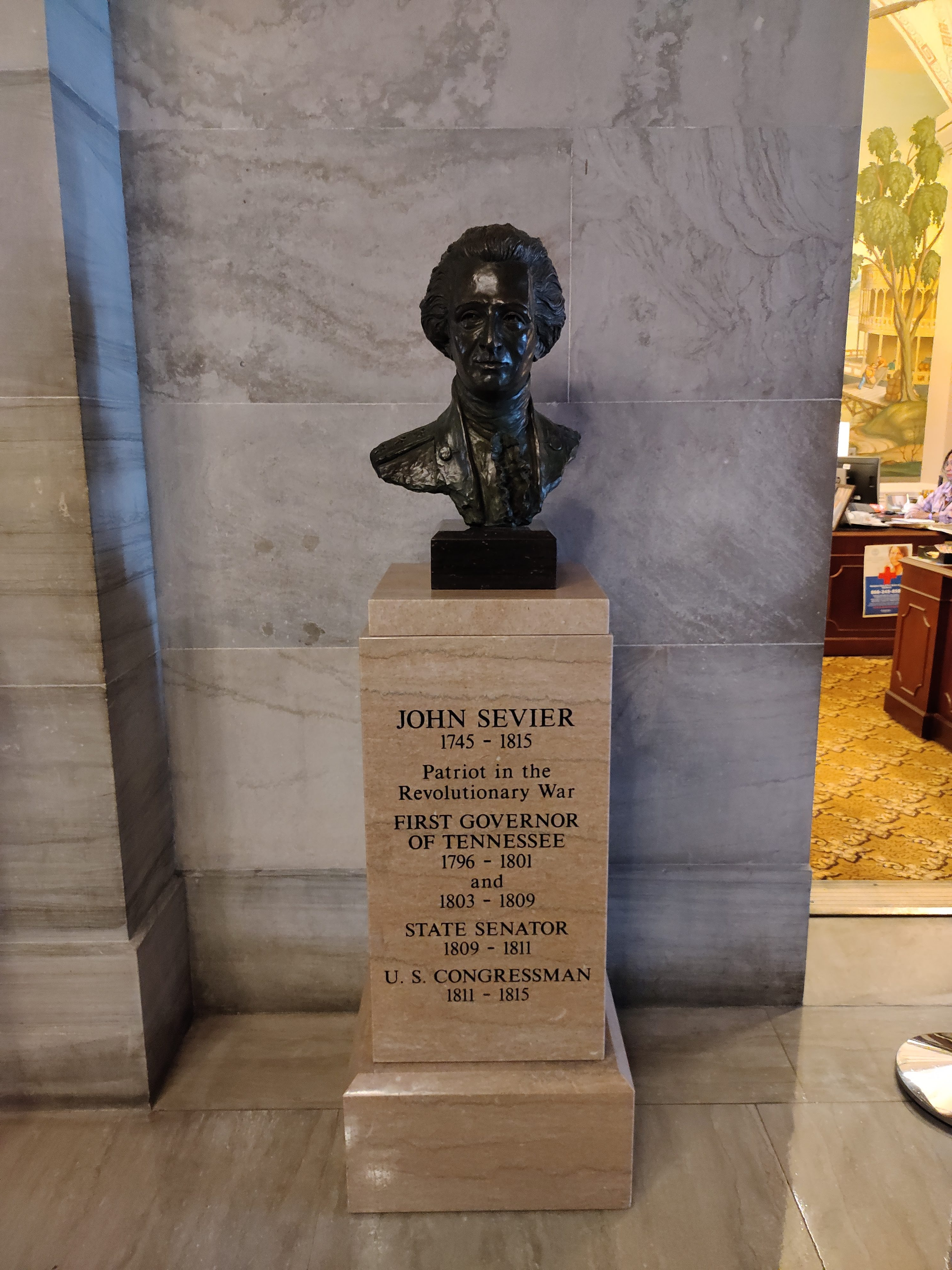
Bust of first Tennessee Governor John Sevier.

Busts of Polk and Jackson were placed in the main hall in December 1963. They were started by Scholz and completed by Gifford Proctor in 1961 after her death. Griffin Chiles sculpted a bust of Sequoyah for the library room in 1994. A bust of Sampson W. Keeble, the first Black member of the Tennessee General Assembly, was sculpted by Roy W. Butler and unveiled in the main hall on March 29, 2010. To make way for this, the Maury bust was moved to the Tennessee State Museum. A bust of Davy Crockett by Antonio Tobias Mendez was dedicated on December 6, 2016. Two bas-reliefs that depict Tennessee's role in the passage of the 19th Amendment and the Reconstruction Amendments adorn the house chamber on opposite sides. The first, by Alan LeQuire, is based on a photograph of women's suffragists in Knoxville, and was dedicated on February 18, 1998. This bas-relief recognizes Tennessee as the deciding state that allowed the 19th Amendment to be certified. The second depicts African American men voting in Nashville after the passage of the 14th and 15th Amendments, and commemorates Tennessee's role in their ratification, particularly as the first former Confederate state to ratify the 14th Amendment. It was sculpted by Jin Huang Powell and installed in 2000.

== Lighting ==
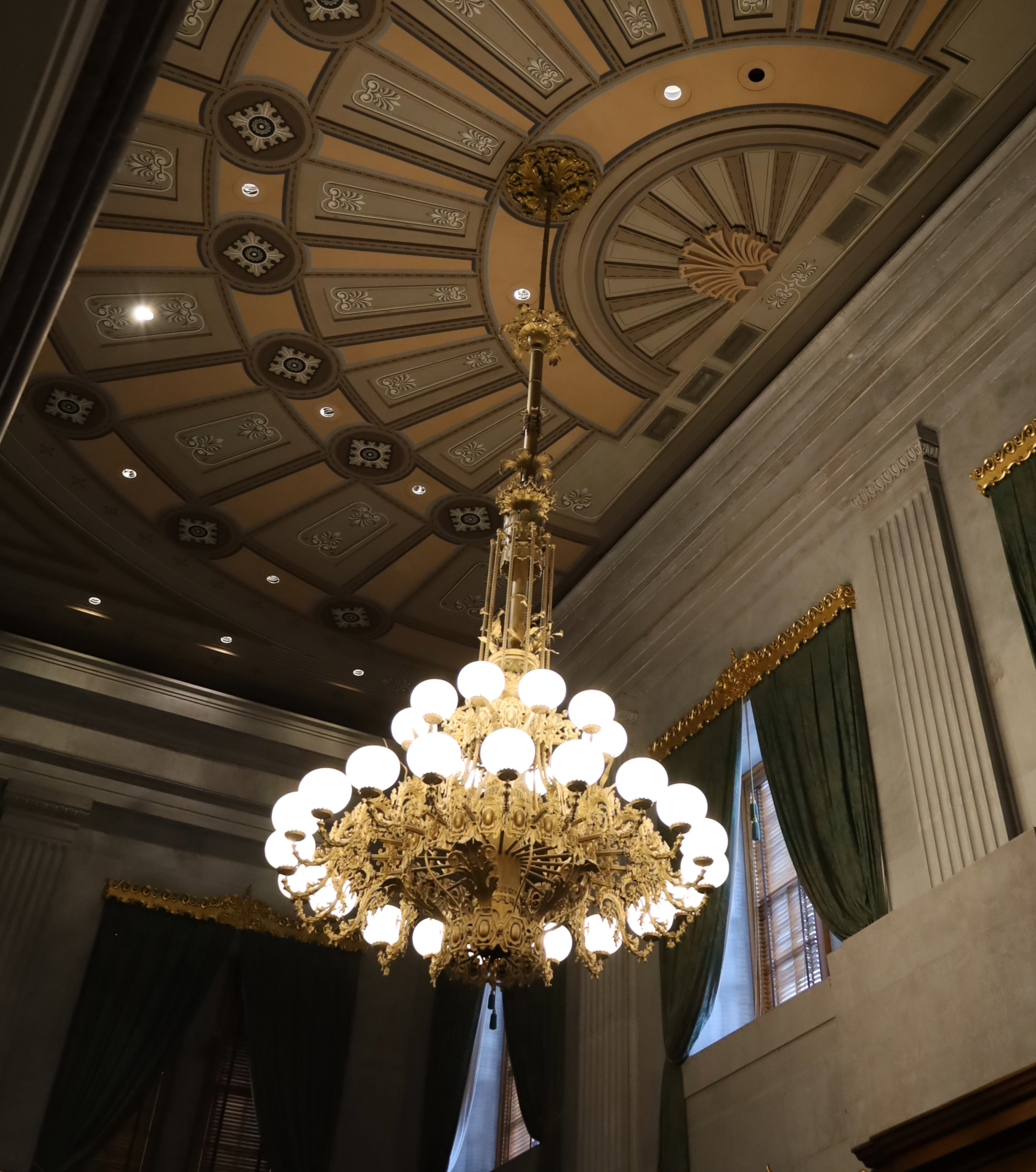
The chandelier in the senate chamber was made by Cornelius & Baker of Philadelphia in 1855.

The hallways and chambers are lit by elaborate cast-brass chandeliers. Four are original gasoliers, made by Cornelius & Baker of Philadelphia and converted to electricity around 1895. This firm also made chandeliers for the United States Capitol and several statehouses. Two of the originals, both manufactured in 1855, include the 18-globe chandelier in the library room, decorated with figures of Tennessee flowers; and the 30-globe fixture in the senate chamber. This chandelier incorporates bronze figurines of Native Americans and buffalo heads to represent the state's early history and settlement; and statuettes of the state's major agricultural products of corn heads, tobacco leaves, and cotton blossoms. The other originals are located in the central corridor on the legislative floor. Cornelius & Baker manufactured or received orders for a total of 34 chandeliers for the capitol between 1855 and 1857. Two additional chandeliers planned for the legislative-floor corridor were reportedly never ordered due to the looming American Civil War.

The house chamber originally had a single 45-foot-wide (14 m) 48-burner chandelier of similar design to the one in the senate. It was noted for its elaborate design in Philadelphia newspapers when it was made in 1855. It was removed on March 5, 1889, after several legislators had expressed concerns about its structural integrity. The chandelier was known to sway in breezes. An inspection after its removal found it to be structurally sound, but it was nevertheless not reinstalled and sold at auction. Pieces of this chandelier have resurfaced over the years, and some of them are now displayed at the Tennessee State Museum. The four present chandeliers in the house chamber were installed during the capitol building's major restoration between February 1958 and January 1959. Additional gold leaf replicas of the originals were installed in the supreme court chamber, cabinet offices, and halls during a project from June 1987 to January 1988 that restored much of the building to its appearance in the 1850s. Some of these are composed of pieces of the originals that were discovered after their removal. Eight lampposts with sculptures of seminude female figures representing Morning, Noon, and Night were installed by the four entrances to the capitol in November 1859. They were plagued by severe rusting and were removed during the capitol's major restoration in 1958. One of these figures is now displayed at Rutledge Falls near Tullahoma, Tennessee.

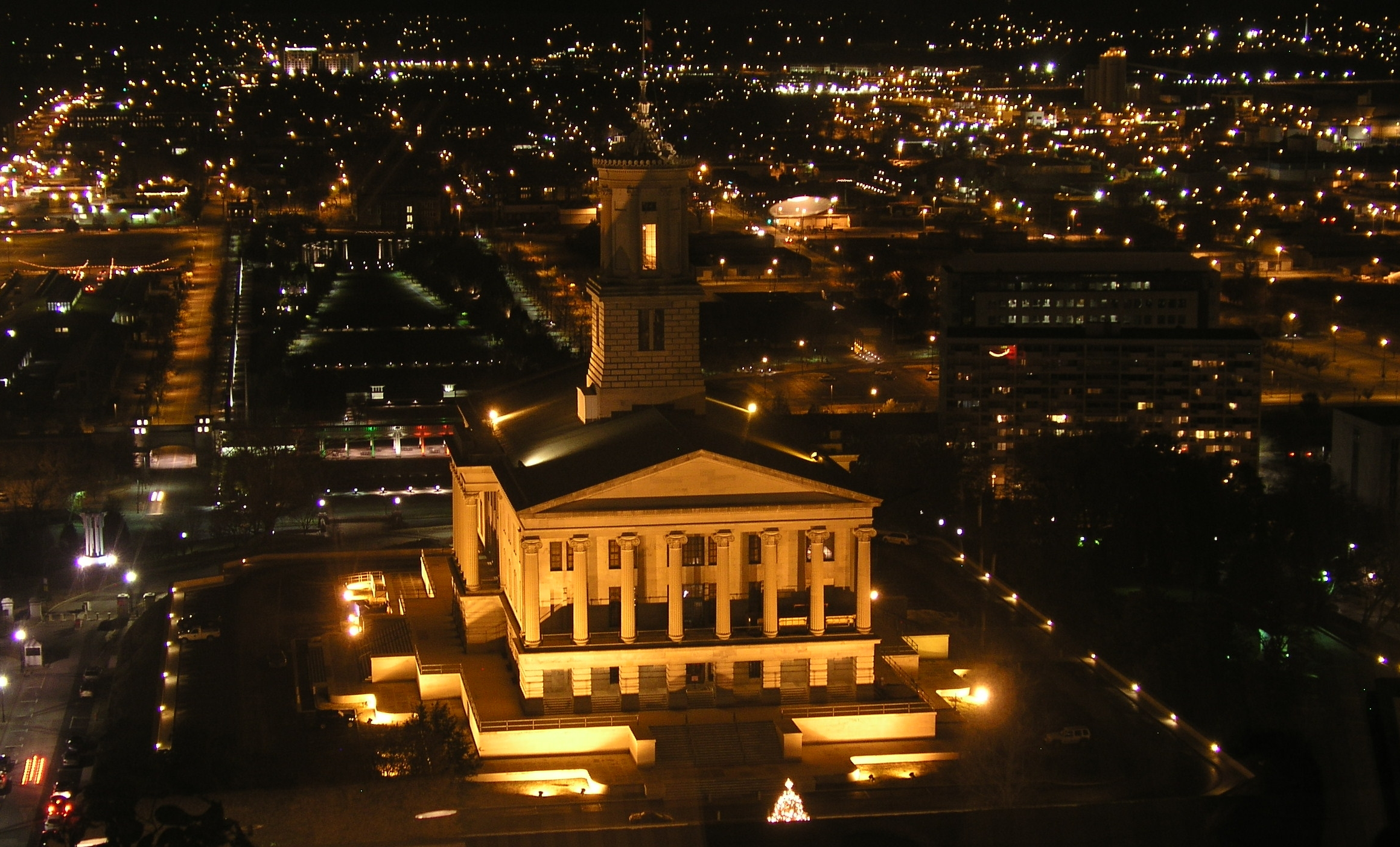
The Tennessee State Capitol illuminated at night in December 2008. The Capitol Christmas Tree is displayed in the foreground.

Each night of the year, the exterior of the capitol is decoratively illuminated by floodlights on the grounds. Electric lighting was first installed on the grounds in the summer of 1886. These were replaced by pole-mounted arc lamps in 1902. In early 1958, these fixtures were replaced by high-power ground-mounted floodlights. The fixtures illuminating the cupola were replaced with LED lighting in 2018 as part of a restoration of the cupola. The floodlights on the grounds that light the building were replaced with LED fixtures in 2020. Installation of LEDs allowed the capitol to be lit with different colors for the first time. The statehouse is now frequently lit with colors chosen to match seasonal events and holidays, and organizations are allowed to make requests. Each year during the Christmas and holiday season, a large Christmas tree, usually measuring between 30 and 40 feet (9.1 and 12.2 m) tall, is displayed atop the Motlow Tunnel entrance on the stairwell to the south capitol entrance. The tree is lit during a ceremony officiated by the Governor and First Lady, known as Christmas at the Capitol.

== Other nearby monuments and memorials ==
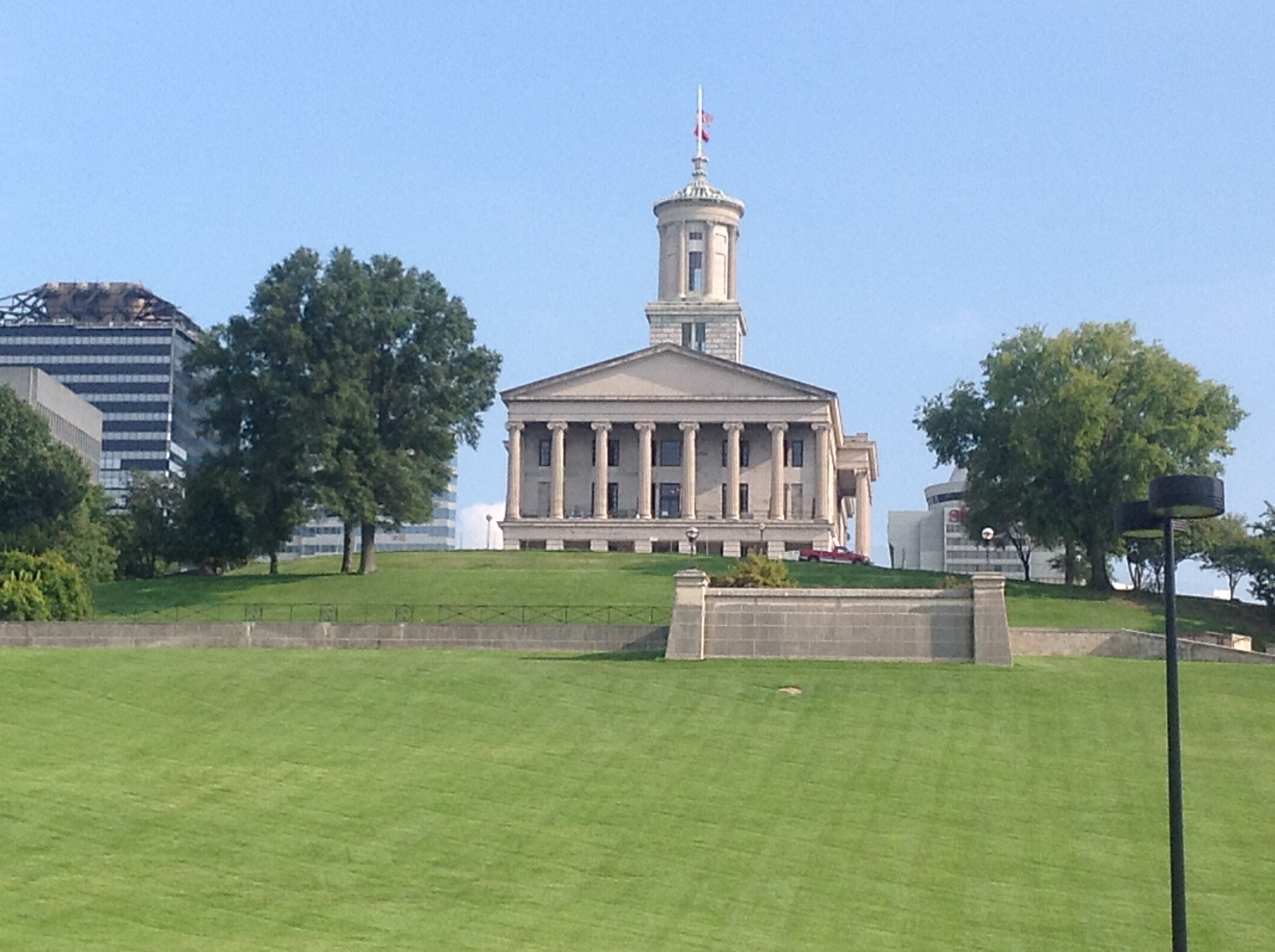
The Tennessee State Capitol as viewed from Bicentennial Capitol Mall State Park. This park is considered an extension of the capitol grounds and features several monuments and memorials.

Bicentennial Capitol Mall State Park is a state park located immediately north of the capitol grounds, separated by James Robertson Parkway. This park, modeled on the National Mall in Washington, D.C., is considered an extension of the capitol grounds, and was created to commemorate Tennessee's bicentennial in 1996. Like the main grounds, it also features several monuments and memorials, including a memorial to Tennesseans who served in World War II, a monument commemorating the Tennessee Centennial and International Exposition of 1897, a monument that recognizes the state's role in the civil rights movement, a monument honoring Tennesseans who served in the Civilian Conservation Corps, and a Statehood Memorial atop the site of the McNairy Spring, a hydrological sulfur spring that was used by settlers and residents of the area as a main source of water in the 18th and 19th centuries. Additional fragments from the Charles Warterfield Reliquary are found on the mall, and an obelisk that entails the history of the capitol building and the struggle to preserve it is nearby.

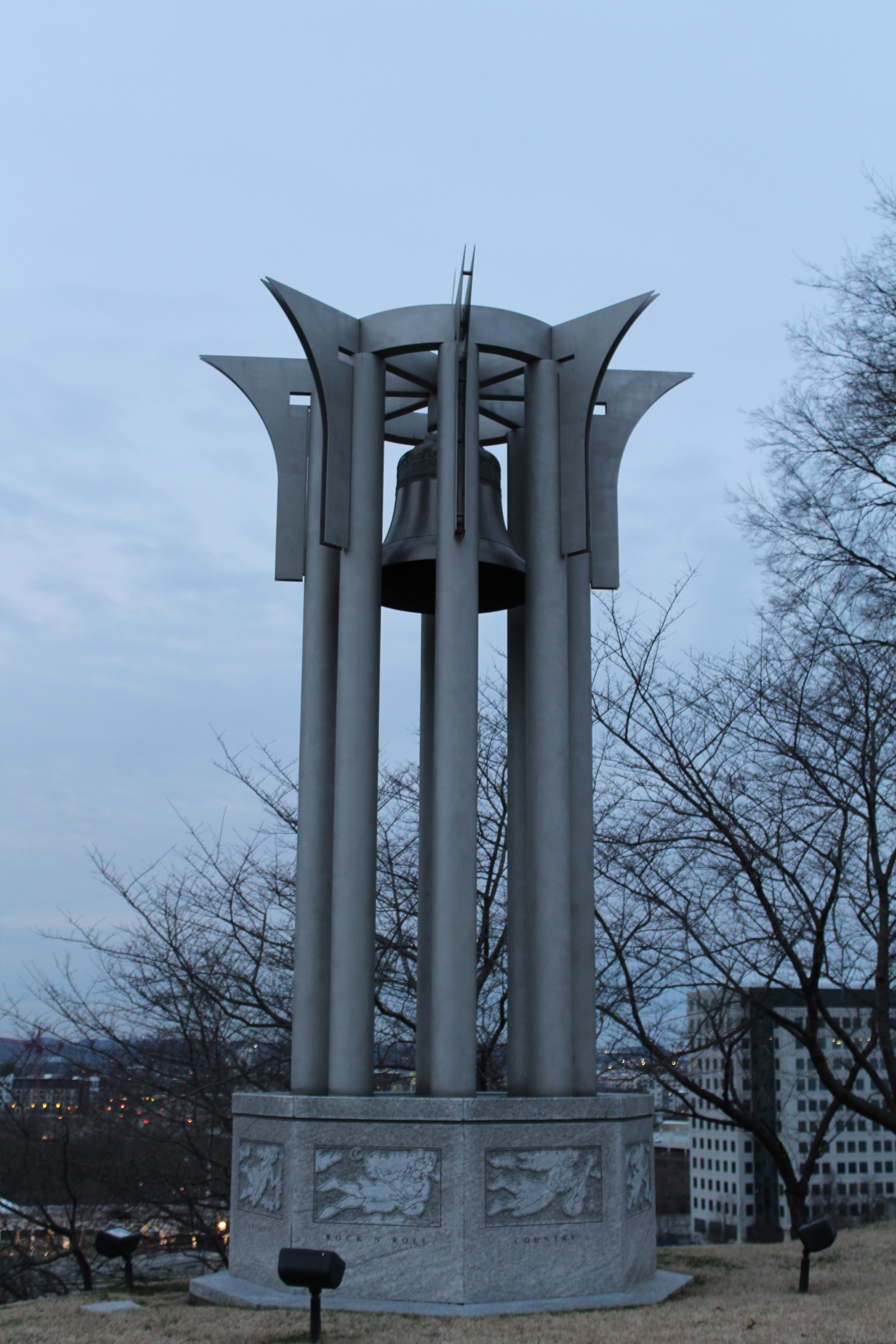
The Answer Bell on Capitol Hill complements a 95-bell carillon at Bicentennial Capitol Mall State Park. The tower that houses the bell is modeled on the Tower of the Winds in Athens.

The Answer Bell, also called the 96th Bell, is near the northwest corner of the capitol near the top of Capitol Hill. This bell, dedicated on statehood day, June 1, 2003, complements the 95-bell carillon on Bicentennial Mall. The Answer Bell joins in with the carillon at the top of each hour; the bell is meant to represent the government's commitment to the people. It also pays homage to the state's musical heritage. The stainless steel tower that houses this bell was inspired by the Choragic Monument of Lysicrates, like the cupola on the capitol, and the Tower of the Winds in Athens. On each face of the octagonal granite base are inscriptions of female angels, or "musicks", representing the major genres of music in Tennessee. This was designed by artist Paul Harmon, who took inspiration from the angelic figures on the Tower of the Winds. Legislative Plaza, directly south of the capitol, is also sometimes considered an extension of the capitol grounds. This public park has monuments and memorials to Tennesseans who served and died in various wars. Legislative Plaza is situated next to the War Memorial Building, which was built to memorialize Tennesseans who died in World War I. This plaza's predecessor, Victory Square Park, became the preferred location for war memorials after the War Memorial Building was completed in 1925, and new memorials have been consistently added since then.

== Controversies ==
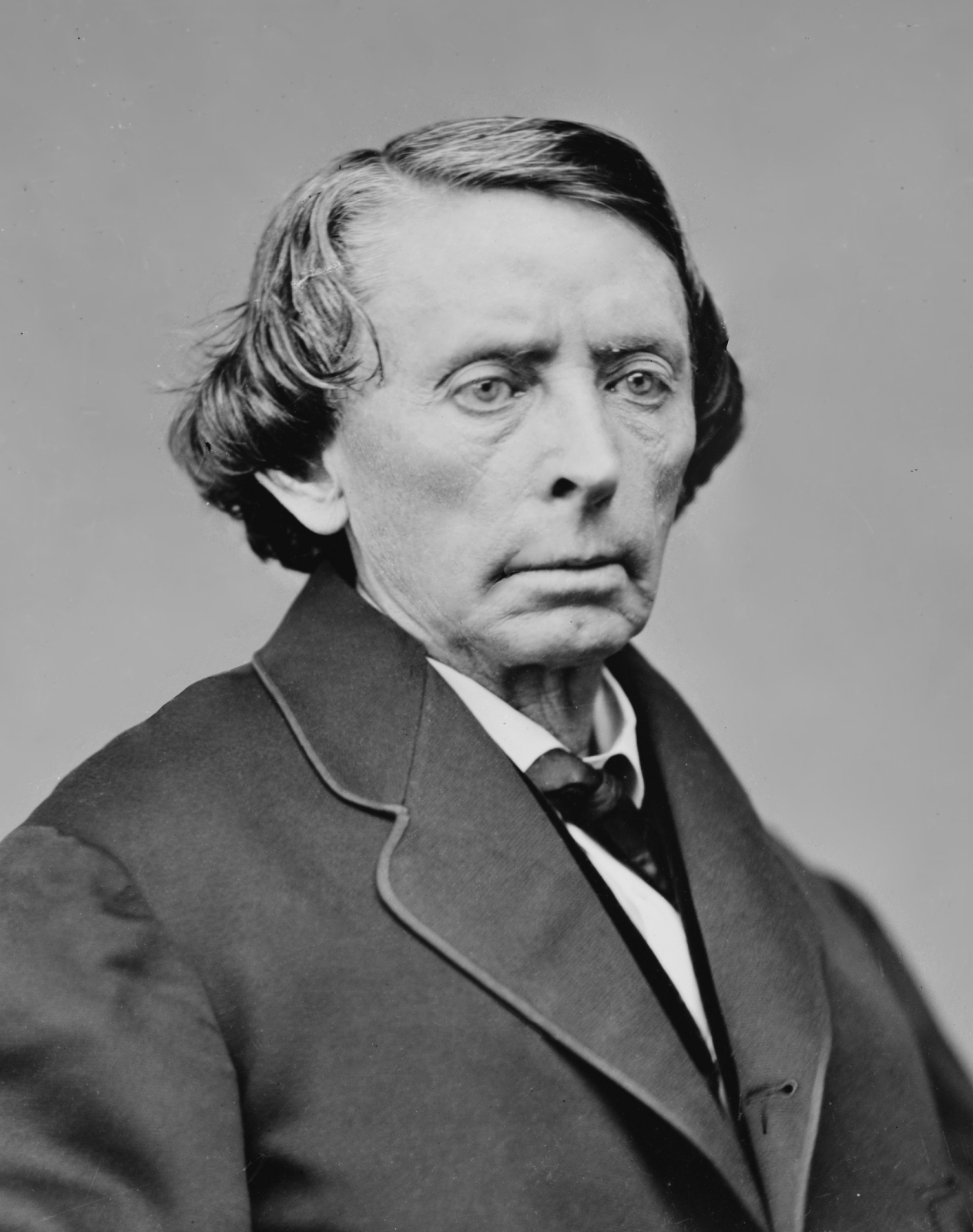
A portrait of Reconstruction era Tennessee Governor Parson Brownlow (pictured) was displayed in the capitol in the later 19th century, and was virulently opposed by Confederate sympathizers. It was reinstalled in 1987, and quickly drew fire from legislators who objected to its display because of Brownlow's treatment of former Confederates.

After the Civil War, many Confederate sympathizers objected to artwork in the capitol honoring Union leaders. Portraits of Reconstruction era governor Parson Brownlow and Union General George Henry Thomas by George Dury were installed in the house chamber shortly after the war, and moved to the library in 1870 after the legislature ordered their relocation. Many legislators were so offended by the Brownlow portrait that they would frequently spit on it, requiring the artist to retouch it. In 1905, the house passed a resolution to give the Thomas portrait to Union veteran and Tennessee Historical Society vice president Gates P. Thruston, but this failed in the senate. The portrait was eventually removed and placed in storage, but it is unknown when this occurred. The Brownlow portrait was moved throughout various state buildings before returning to the library room in April 1987 during the room's restoration. This immediately drew fire from several legislators, including state senator and Sons of Confederate Veterans member Douglas Henry, who objected because Brownlow disenfranchised Confederates during his administration. Henry later iterated that he did not object to its presence in the capitol, but did not want it displayed in "a place of prominence". The capitol restoration commission voted to move it a few weeks later, despite opposition from East Tennessee legislators. East Tennessee was heavily Unionist during the war. This decision was also criticized as racist and sympathetic to the Confederate cause. The portrait was removed on May 27, 1987, along with portraits of several governors as part of the renovation project, and installed in the state museum shortly thereafter.

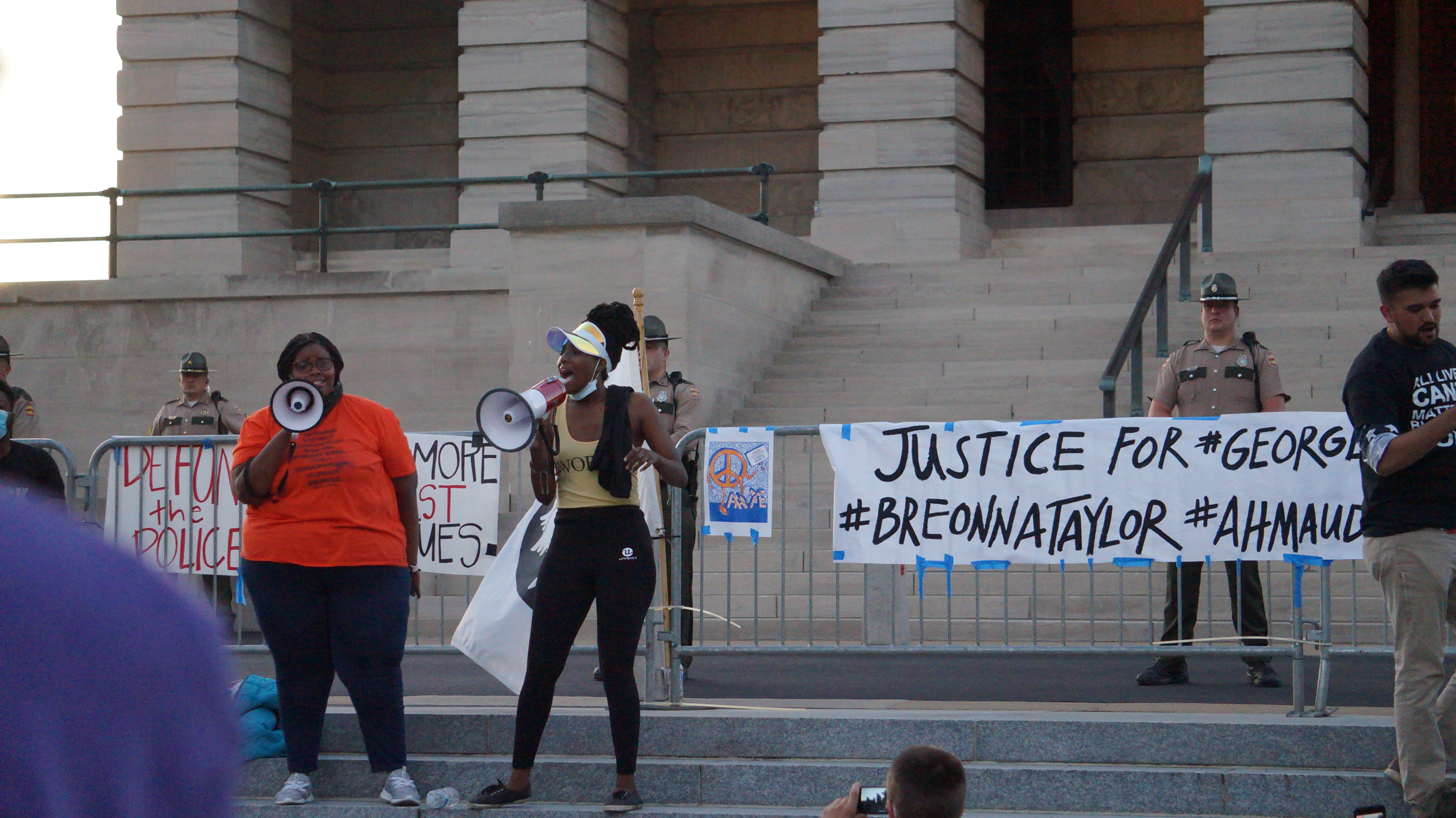
A demonstration against the murder of George Floyd on the capitol steps in 2020. This event renewed debate over Confederate monuments at the capitol, leading to removal of the Nathan Bedford Forrest Bust the following year.

The Statue of Edward W. Carmack by Nancy Cox-McCormack was unveiled on June 6, 1925, honoring a Tennessee journalist and U.S. Senator who was murdered nearby in 1908. It was controversial because of Carmack's racist views, particularly his calls for retaliation against Ida B. Wells. Calls for permanent removal occurred during its temporary relocation for the Motlow Tunnel construction in the late 1950s. On May 30, 2020, the statue was toppled by protestors demonstrating against the police murder of George Floyd and other acts of police brutality against African Americans. They unofficially claimed the area as "Ida B. Wells Plaza" in an attempt to set up an autonomous zone modeled on Capitol Hill Autonomous Zone in Seattle. The statue was not reinstalled, but its base was initially left in place and not removed until the Crockett statue was installed in 2026.

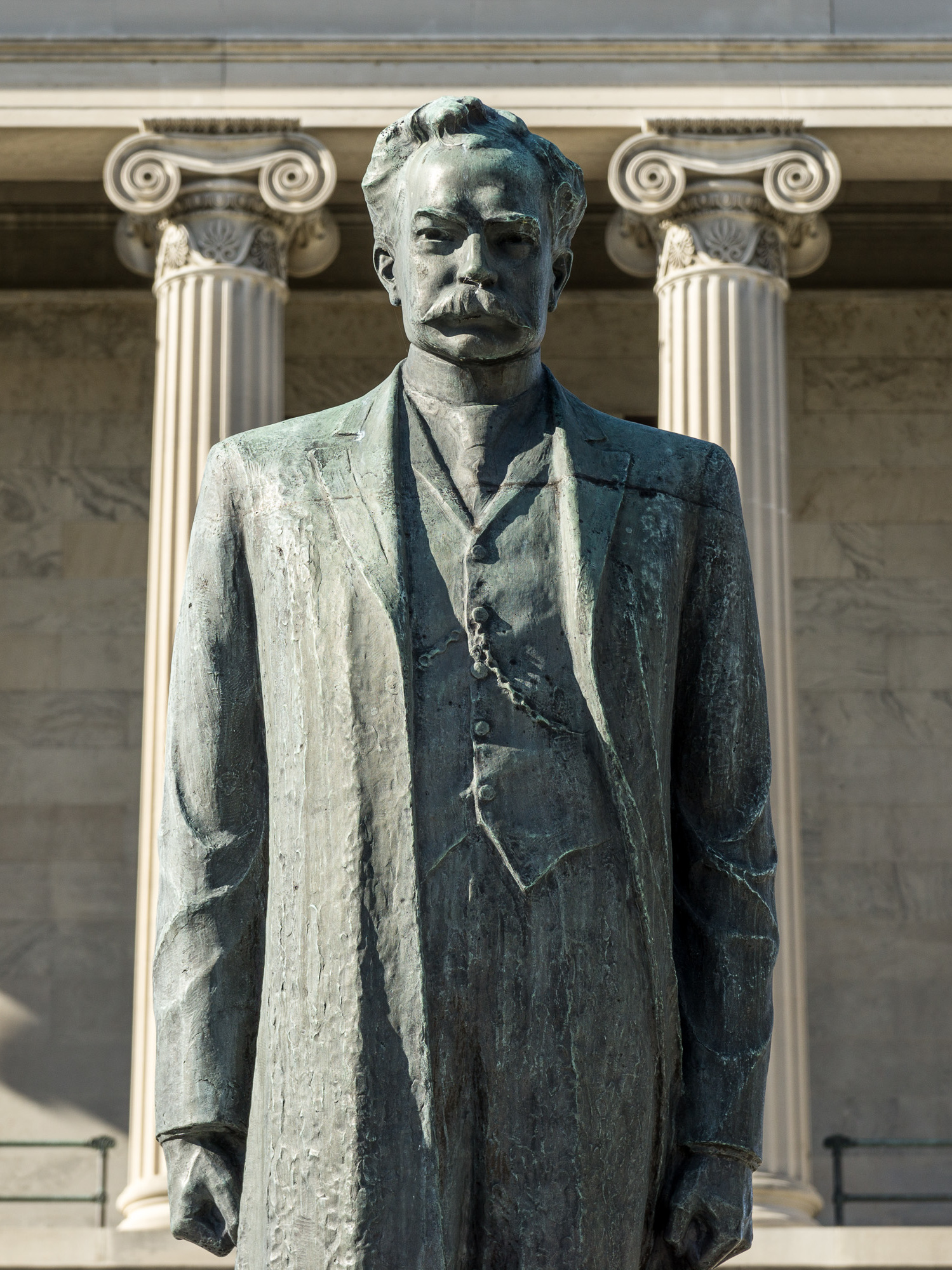
A statue of segregationist U.S. Senator Edward W. Carmack was removed by protestors in 2020, and not reinstalled.

In 1973, Henry introduced legislation to commission a bust of Nathan Bedford Forrest, a slave trader, Confederate general, and the first Grand Wizard of the Ku Klux Klan, for the capitol. He wanted a memorial to the Confederate counterpart to Farragut, who he considered the most influential Union officer from Tennessee. The Nathan Bedford Forrest Bust was sculpted by Loura Jane Herndon Baxendale and dedicated in the main hall on November 5, 1978. It was controversial from its inception, facing protests the day of its dedication. A movement to relocate the bust gained momentum after the Charleston church shooting and Unite the Right rally, and was supported by Governor Haslam. After Governor Bill Lee called for its removal following the social unrest of 2020, the Tennessee Historical Commission voted on March 9, 2021, to relocate it to the state museum, along with the Farragut and Gleaves busts. The busts were removed on July 23, 2021, and installed in the museum three days later.

For many years, there was strong opposition to honoring Andrew Johnson at the capitol because of his opposition to federally-guaranteed civil rights for African Americans and failures during the Reconstruction era, as well as from some people who considered him an enemy to southerners. This largely subsided by the time his statue was dedicated. The Middle Passage monument drew criticism from Sons of Confederate Veterans members shortly after its installation, who claimed some of the information on the plaque was inaccurate and accused the Black Caucus of trying to rewrite history. Of particular criticism, which was also levied by historians, was the inaccurate claims that slaves were first brought to the Americas around 1444 and that as many as 100 million slaves were transported to the Americas in the Middle Passage. The unborn children memorial drew controversy from abortion rights advocates and supporters before its installation, who argued that it stigmatizes women and takes a stance on the abortion debate. It was also criticized as a distraction from more pressing issues, such as the state's high infant and maternal mortality rate and low health ranking. Protests were held during the monument's dedication.

== See also ==
- Tennessee State Capitol
- Bicentennial Capitol Mall State Park
- War Memorial Building (Nashville, Tennessee)
- Legislative Plaza
- Centennial Park (Nashville)
