= Tennessee Monument to Unborn Children =

Monument in Nashville, Tennessee, United States

- Interactive map of Tennessee Monument to Unborn Children
- Location: Tennessee State Capitol, Nashville, Tennessee, United States
- Coordinates: 36°9′56″N 86°47′0″W
- Fabricator: Maryville Monument Company
- Material: Granite
- Dedicated date: June 24, 2026
- Dedicated to: Children who were not born due to abortion or miscarriage

The Tennessee Monument to Unborn Children is a monument on the grounds of the Tennessee State Capitol in Nashville, Tennessee, United States. It was dedicated in 2026 in recognition of children who were conceived but never born, as a result of either abortion or miscarriage.

Legislation for the monument was proposed in 2018 by two members of the Tennessee Republican Party in the Tennessee General Assembly. While popular among many Republican legislators, the proposal was largely opposed by members of the Tennessee Democratic Party and supporters of abortion rights. In 2025, several donations spurred renewed progress on the monument's erection. It was created by the Maryville Monument Company of Blount County, Tennessee, and consists of a granite block. It was dedicated on June 24, 2026, the fourth anniversary of the Supreme Court of the United States's decision Dobbs v. Jackson Women's Health Organization, which allowed abortion to become illegal in Tennessee.

== History ==
=== Legislation ===
The idea for a monument originated in 2018. In February of that year, Steve Southerland of the Tennessee Senate and Jerry Sexton of the Tennessee House of Representatives (both members of the Tennessee Republican Party) served as sponsors for legislation, HB 2381, that would allow for the erection of a monument on the grounds of the Tennessee State Capitol dedicated to "children who were not born due to miscarriage or abortion", per the legislation. The two had previously worked together in 2016 on legislation to make the Bible the official state book, which was ultimately vetoed by Governor Bill Haslam. Per HB 2381, the monument would not be erected using funding from the state government and would bear the following inscription:

Tennessee Monument to Unborn Children, In Memory of the Victims of Abortion: Babies, Women, and Men.

The legislation was largely supported by other Republicans in the Tennessee General Assembly, including Senator Janice Bowling and Representative Bill Dunn. In discussing the proposed monument, both Dunn and Sexton compared it to other memorials on the capitol grounds that recognized victims of the Holocaust and slavery. Members of the Tennessee Democratic Party, including those representing the capital city of Nashville, Tennessee, were largely opposed to the monument. Democratic Representative John Ray Clemmons of Nashville said of the purpose of the monument, "It's either to stigmatize women who've made the most difficult decision of their life, or those who didn't have a decision, or it's to make a political statement, or all of the above."

In mid-April, the House of Representatives voted 63–15 in favor of the legislation. Following this, the Senate subsequently voting 23–3 on a modified version of the legislation, prompting it to return to the House for another vote. Ultimately, the legislation was approved by the legislature and became law that year. If erected, it would be the second monument concerning abortion in the state, following the 1994 creation of the National Memorial for the Unborn in Chattanooga, Tennessee. At the time the legislation was introduced, abortion was legal in the state.

=== Creation efforts ===
In March 2023, HuffPost reported that there had been no donations made towards the monument's fund since the legislation had been presented approximately five years prior. By this time, abortion had become illegal in the state, following the 2022 repeal of Roe v. Wade by the Supreme Court of the United States in the case Dobbs v. Jackson Women's Health Organization. Additionally, in 2023, the government of Arkansas enacted legislation aiming to install a similar monument on the grounds of their capitol.

According to reporting from the Nashville Scene, erecting the monument was a major priority of Senator Tom Hatcher, who assumed office in 2024 and campaigned to raise money for the monument. In August 2025, the fund received a $4,000 donation from a private donor, and by December, the monument fund had received two donations. Hatcher raised money for the monument through a nonprofit he operated, Tom Hatcher Charity, with a majority of the donations coming from legislators. Additionally, the charity would accept donations for the monument's upkeep. Hatcher also negotiated with Maryville Monument Company of Blount County, Tennessee, on the monument's creation and installation, which cost $7,500 (equivalent to $7,700 in 2025). By December 2025, organizers planned to unveil the monument in June 2026. The project still remained largely unpopular with Democratic elected officials, with Senator Heidi Campbell requesting that the monument not be installed at the capitol.

=== Dedication ===
The monument was dedicated on June 24, 2026, on the fourth anniversary of the United States Supreme Court's overturning of Roe v. Wade. Approximately 125 people attended the ceremony, including about 50 elected officials, as well as representatives from the anti-abortion group Tennessee Right to Life. A protest against the monument was conducted at the same time as the dedication, led by Representative Aftyn Behn and involving the Tennessee Advocates for Planned Parenthood.

== Design and location ==
The monument is made of granite and, per reporting from Chris Davis of WTVF, has the appearance of "a cemetery marker". It bears the following inscription:

In Memory of the Unborn / The Baby whose life was lost / The Mother who regrets / The Father who couldn't protect / The Child who lost a sibling / & Society, which is coarsened by every deliberate attack on human life / Dedicated June 24, 2026

The monument was installed on the southeast section of the capitol grounds. Concerning the location, Sexton said, "It had to go here, because there's a Holocaust memorial on one side and a memorial to slavery on the other. What both of those have in common is that they weren't considered real people. Both of those memorials say, 'Never forget,' but here we are killing babies, and it's legal to do it."

== See also ==
- 2026 in art
- Abortion in Tennessee
- List of public art in Nashville, Tennessee
- Tennessee State Capitol artwork, monuments, and memorials
