= List of public art in Nashville, Tennessee =

This is a list of public art in Nashville, Tennessee, in the United States. This list applies only to works of public art on permanent display in an outdoor public space. For example, this does not include artworks in museums. Public art may include sculptures, statues, monuments, memorials, murals, and mosaics.

Image	Title / subject	Location and coordinates	Date	Artist / designer	Type	Material	Dimensions	Designation	Owner / administrator	Wikidata	Notes
More images	Confederate Private Monument	Centennial Park 36°8′52.37″N 86°48′45.39″W	1909	George Julian Zolnay	Statue	Bronze					
More images	Equestrian statue of Andrew Jackson	Tennessee State Capitol	1880	Clark Mills	Equestrian statue	Bronze					Reproduction of the original statue in Washington, D.C.
	Musica	Music Row 36°9′7.52″N 86°47′29.92″W	2003	Alan LeQuire	Sculpture	Bronze					
	Nathan Bedford Forrest Statue	36°3′42″N 86°46′17″W	1998	Jack Kershaw	Equestrian statue						
More images	Sam Davis Statue	Tennessee State Capitol 36°9′54.35″N 86°47′3.25″W	1909	George Julian Zolnay	Statue	Bronze					
	Statue of Edward W. Carmack	Tennessee State Capitol	1927	Nancy Cox-McCormack	Statue						Removed in 2020.
	Statue of Sam Davis	Montgomery Bell Academy 36.12856°N 86.8366°W	1999	Alan LeQuire	Statue	Bronze					
More images	Tennessee Confederate Women's Monument	Tennessee State Capitol	1926	Belle Kinney Scholz	Statue	Bronze					
