= Samuel Morgan =

American businessman and manufacturer (1798–1880)

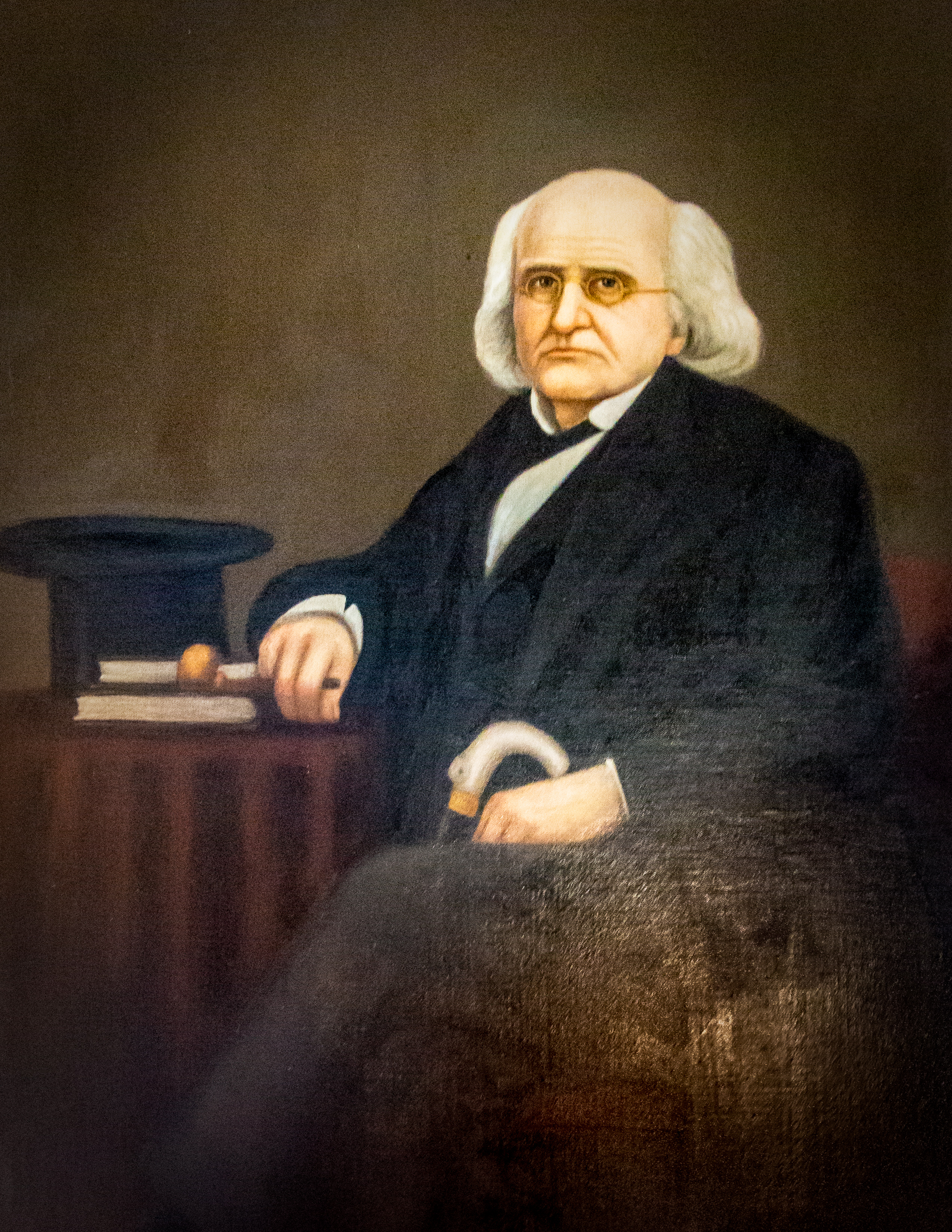
- Painting in the Tennessee State Capitol building
- Born: November 8, 1798; Staunton, Virginia, U.S.
- Died: June 10, 1880 (aged 81); Nashville, Tennessee, U.S.
- Occupation: Businessman
- Spouse: Matilda Grant Rose Mackintosh
- Children: 12

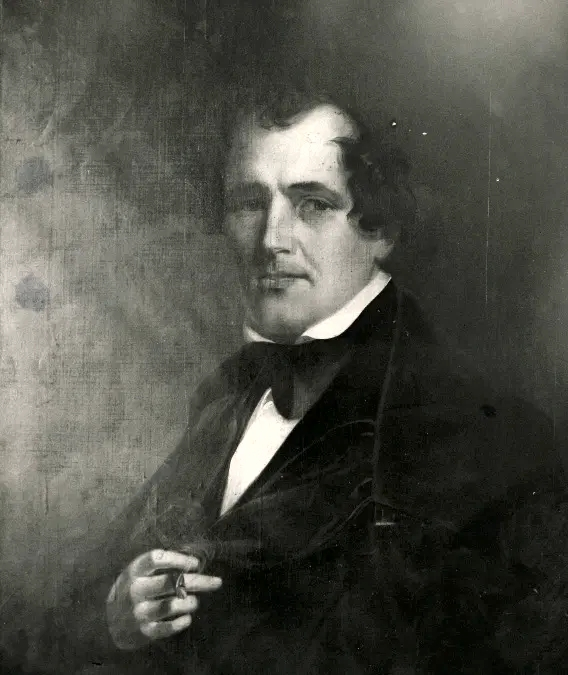
Young Samuel Morgan, by T. J. Odell, 1842

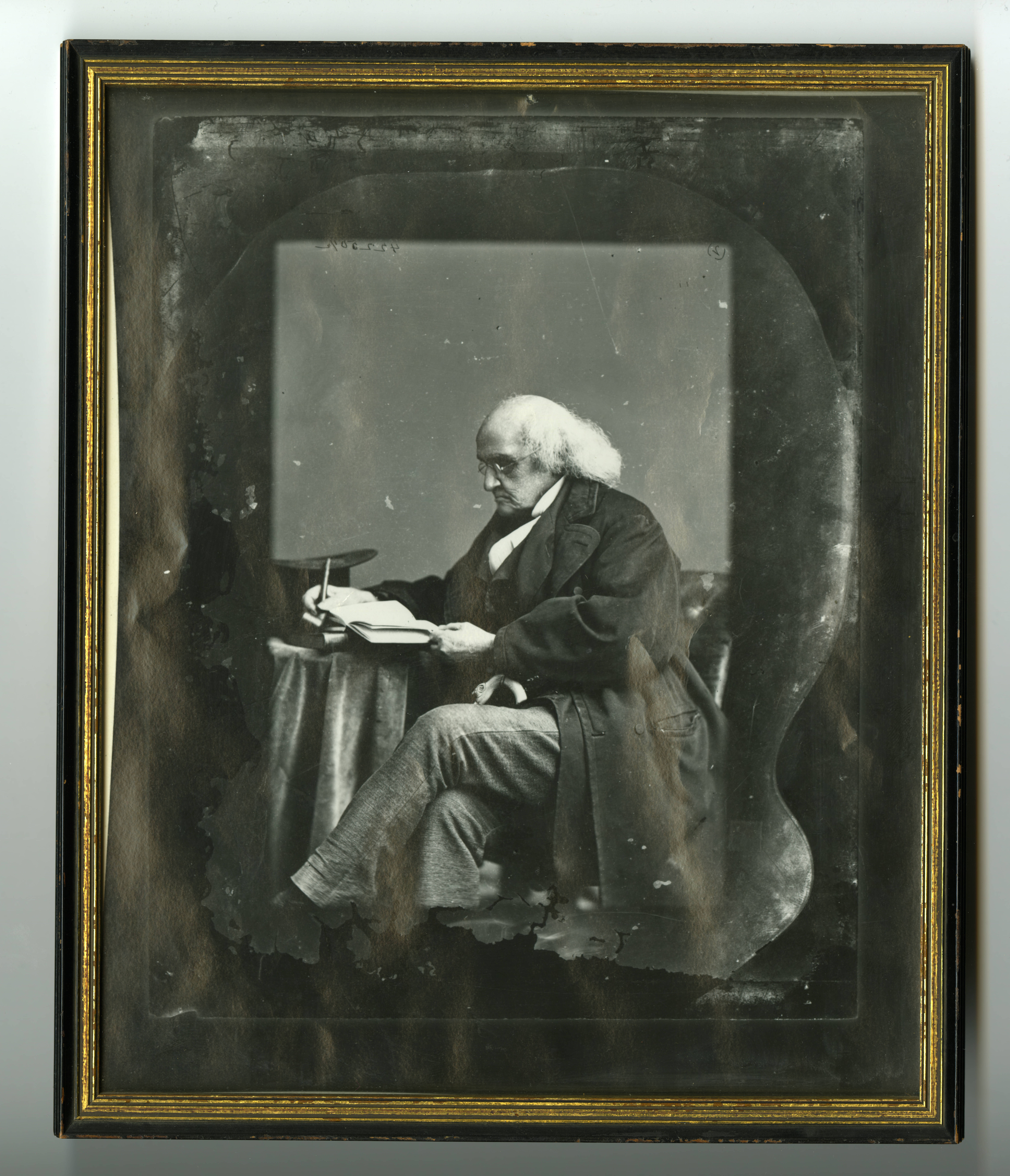
Samuel Morgan seated at a desk in his late years

Samuel Dold Morgan (November 8, 1798 – June 10, 1880), was an American businessman, builder, and manufacturer, known as "The Merchant Prince of Nashville".

== Early life ==
Samuel Dold Morgan was born in Staunton, Virginia.

== Career ==
Morgan moved to Nashville in January 1833, where he became involved in dry goods and banking. He was at once a merchant, architect and builder. His firm, Morgan and Company, was one of the largest wholesale importers of dry goods and a manufacturer of clothing; the business was sufficiently sound and respected to be permitted to issue script money during the Panic of January 30, 1844. He was appointed to the new commission charged with planning a new State Capitol for Tennessee, becoming its president in 1854, Morgan was instrumental in choosing William Strickland of Philadelphia as the architect of this monumental structure.

In 1856, his firm built the Italianate style Morgan-Reeves Building at 208-210 Public Square; the building survived until 1975.

During the American Civil War, Morgan engaged in manufacturing munitions for the Confederates until Nashville's occupation by Union forces. He was also a Confederate official, serving as chairman of the Central Bureau of Military Supplies in Nashville during the War. Morgan had two sons killed during the war serving in the Confederate States Army. His nephew, Brig. Gen. John Hunt Morgan of Alabama, served with the Confederate cavalry and gained fame as the leader of Morgan's Raiders. He was killed in 1864.

== Personal life ==
Morgan was married on November 2, 1819, to Matilda Grant Rose Mackintosh of Staunton. They had 12 children.

== Death and legacy ==
Morgan died in Nashville and his remains were interred in the southeast corner of the State Capitol.

Morgan Park in the historic Germantown section of Nashville was named in honor of Morgan.

On June 10, 1980, the hundredth anniversary of Samuel Morgan's death, a ceremony was held at the Tennessee Capitol Building in his honor. The State Legislature declared that day to be "Samuel Dold Morgan Day" (Senate Joint Resolution 351).
