= George Floyd protests in Tennessee =

2020 civil unrest after the murder of George Floyd

- Part of George Floyd protests
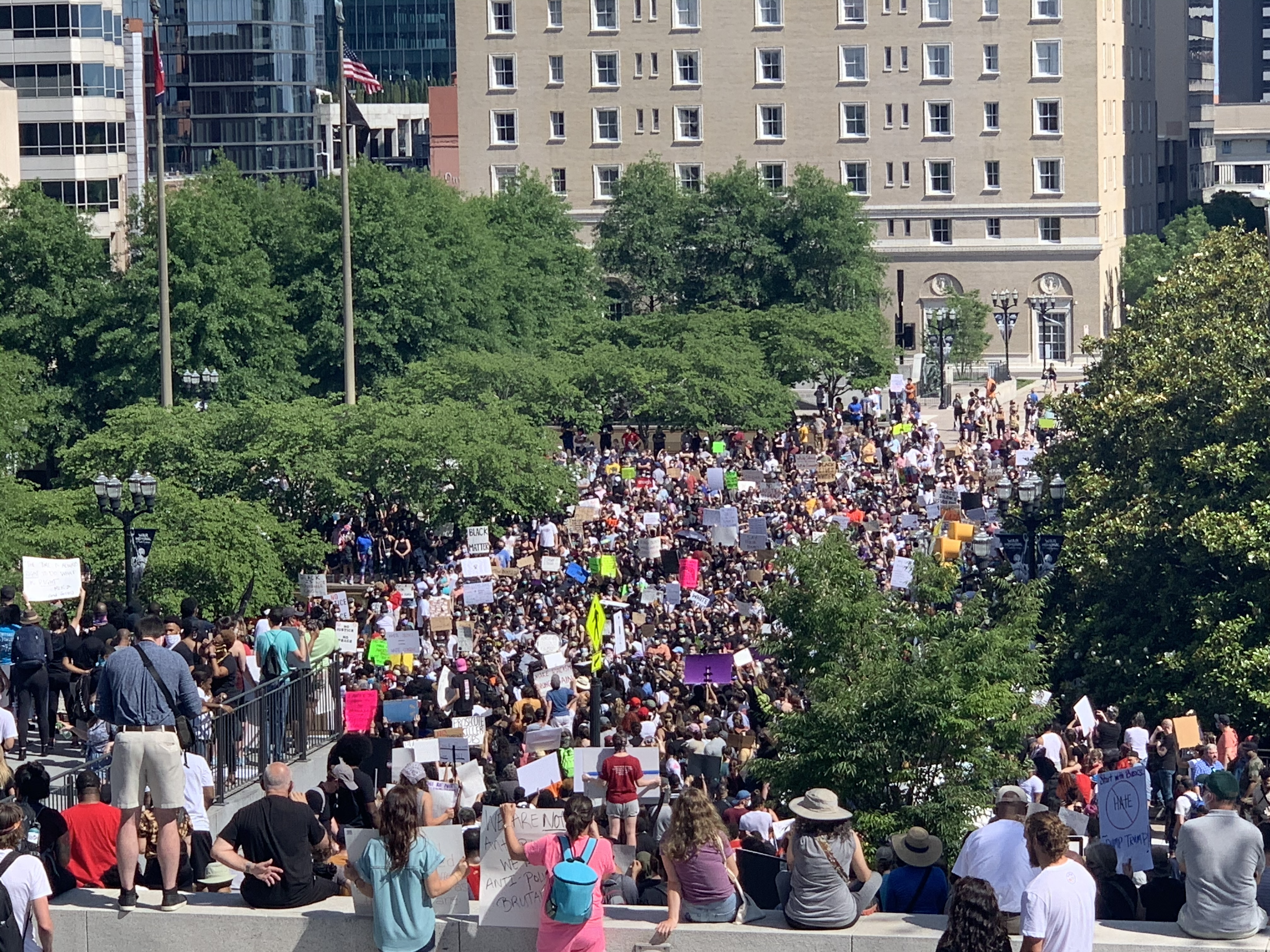
- Crowd of protesters in front of the Tennessee State Capitol in Nashville
- Date: May 27 – June 12, 2020 (2 weeks and 2 days)
- Location: Tennessee, United States
- Caused by: Police brutality; Institutional racism against African Americans; Reaction to the murder of George Floyd; Economic, racial and social inequality

Cities in Tennessee in which a protest with about 100 or more participants was held

The murder of George Floyd on May 25, 2020, triggered a wave of protests throughout Tennessee in late May and early June 2020. These protests continued throughout the year.

== Locations ==
=== Bristol ===
On June 1, about 200 people held a candlelight vigil for George Floyd on State Street in both Bristol, Tennessee and Bristol, Virginia. The protests were largely peacefully held across the Tri-Cities region of Southwest Virginia and East Tennessee.

=== Chattanooga ===
On May 30, there were three different protests which formed throughout the day. Around mid-day hundreds protested at Miller Park followed by a march across the Walnut Street Bridge site of the 1906 lynching of Ed Johnson. At 4pm a silent protest was held in Miller Park. Chattanooga Police Chief David Roddy met with protesters and listened to their concerns about police abuse. At 6pm protesters met again at Walnut Street Bridge led by newly formed activist organization I Can't Breathe Chattanooga but were blocked by police from marching into the North Shore neighborhood.

On May 31, protesters marched from Coolidge Park to the Hamilton County Courthouse. After protesters damaged a light fixture and tore down a banner near the courthouse, the National Guard, the Tennessee Highway Patrol, the Hamilton County Police Department and Chattanooga Police Department began arresting people and dispersing the crowds with tear gas. A statue of Confederate general A.P. Stewart was damaged by protesters during the event. On June 3, during the fifth day of protests, police arrested a man standing on a rooftop along the route of the march with multiple firearms including an AK-47 and six beers.

On June 9, 146 Chattanoogans spoke during a seven-hour-long city council meeting demanding effort to defund the police. Chattanooga's chapter of the Democratic Socialists of America put forward a proposed budget that would have led to millions in cuts from the police budget and movement of those funds to other city programs. In response to what the DSA denounced as "political stonewalling" members of Concerned Citizens for Justice (CCJ) and the DSA protested at Councilman Chip Henderson's house demanding he support the DSA's budget proposal. I Can't Breathe Chattanooga denounced the protest as an invasion of the city council's privacy.

In response to protests the Chattanooga Police updated policy requiring members to intervene in situations of police brutality. Mayor Andy Berke formed a new Office of Community Resilience. The OCR took $150,000 from the police budget to fund social work, recidivism reduction programs, job training for felons and youth mentorship programs. Cameron Williams, of I Can't Breathe Chattanooga, called it a "baby step in the right direction". In late June, 2020 local activists raised money to create a Black Lives Matter mural along Martin Luther King Jr Street in front of the Bessie Smith Cultural Center. The mural was completed on June 29.

=== Clarksville ===
On May 30, over 200 participated in a protest in Clarksville that shut down a major highway but remained peaceful. On June 3, over 100 protesters gathered on the Montgomery County Courthouse chanting "no justice, no peace, prosecute the police" and "I can't breathe". Leonia Tucker, president of community activist group Commission on Religion and Racism (CORR), spoke about the need "to bring awareness to potential problems and create a conversation".

=== Cleveland ===
Dozens protested in downtown Cleveland in front of the Bradley County Courthouse and headquarters of the Cleveland Police Department on May 31. The protest was peaceful, and included protesters discussing police brutality issues with local law enforcement.

In early June, students of Lee University circulated a petition calling for the removal of a local monument honoring the United Daughters of the Confederacy. The author of the petition, political science student Kelsey Osborne, received various death threats. President of the Jefferson Davis Chapter of the UDC Linda Ballew said, "[an] overwhelming majority of Cleveland residents are rallying around our beloved Cleveland monument." On June 30, City Councilman Bill Estes proposed a solution that would erect a monument to Union soldiers who fought in the Civil War to the north side of the Confederate statue on North Ocoee and Broad streets. Estes also proposed signage to be added to the monuments, providing appropriate context to the statues.

On August 10, members of local community activist group Emancipate Cleveland stood outside the city council meeting, asking for the confederate statue to be removed. Community activist Kezmond Pugh called the statue a "symbol of oppression, a symbol of hate". Vice Mayor Avery Johnson suggested City Council should form a task force with members of NAACP, Emancipate Cleveland, and the Cleveland City Council to talk about how to move forward. On August 24, Cleveland City Council voted 4–3 to create a task force to help decide what would happen to the Confederate monument near Lee University. On September 14, Emancipate Cleveland released a statement stating they supported the formation of a task force but the task force's unwillingness to remove the monument was an example of city council "ignoring and deflecting problems they don’t have the courage to face".

=== Jackson ===
Almost 200 protesters showed up to protest peacefully at Jackson City Hall on May 30. On June 10, dozens of protesters gathered in front of Old Hickory Mall for a peaceful demonstration.

=== Johnson City ===
Hundreds of protesters peacefully gathered in Johnson City on May 31. Several protesters were arrested after they refused to stop blocking a road. At a protest on July 13, a confrontation broke out between Black Lives Matter protesters and neo-nazi counter-protesters wearing shirts that read "National Socialist Club 131". Garon Archer, a white nationalist with ties to hate group League of the South and a participant in the Unite the Right rally in Charlottesville, Virginia, was arrested after assaulting a protester.

At a protest on September 13, a North Carolinian man named Jared Lafer drove his vehicle into a crowd of protesters leaving one protester with a concussion, brain bleed and two broken legs. He later turned himself in to the Johnson City Police Department. A Tennessee Grand Jury later dismissed the case. Lafer's attorney argued "he did what he felt was necessary to get out of a situation that he felt was dangerous to his family". Robin Ellis, president of the NAACP for Yancey and Mitchell Counties, called for the incident to be treated as a hate crime citing screenshots of Lafer's social media posts where he joked about running over protesters.

Protests against the Grand Jury decision continued throughout September and October. Victoria Hewlett, who was sitting in a parked car with her husband at an intersection just yards from the hit and run, told The Daily Beast that protesters were crossing the road in a pattern consistent with the walk signal. She says that Lafer pulled up behind her car, then swerved around her vehicle "pretty aggressively," before rounding the corner and driving "directly into where the protesters were in the crosswalk."

=== Knoxville ===
Hundreds of protesters demonstrated on May 29 in front of police headquarters and then marched through downtown Knoxville. The first night of protest remained overwhelmingly peaceful.

On the following night a group of around 50-100 protesters rallied in downtown. After confrontations with the police, protesters began to break windows, shot fireworks, throw trashcans and destroyed a port-a-potty. Two individuals were arrested after an officer was injured. Black Lives Matter Knoxville denounced the vandalism as a distraction from their mission. On June 2, University of Tennessee, Knoxville students organized a peaceful march along Gay Street. The Knoxville chapter of Black Lives Matter chose not to attend the event.

Over the July 4th weekend, activists began painting a Black Lives Matter mural in East Knoxville, on the 2800 block of Martin Luther King Jr. Avenue. They were asked to stop due to a lack of a permit, and could not finish the project. On July 10 the activists completed the mural after acquiring approval from the city.

At a June 6 rally in Worlds Fair Park, 10 Tennessee Volunteers football players and head football coach Jeremy Pruitt spoke in support of the protests. Pruitt announced in press conference that the Volunteers planned to wear black jerseys for the Nov. 7th matchup against Kentucky in Neyland Stadium. Following the game, the team planned to auction off the game-used jerseys and donate the proceeds to the Black Lives Matter movement. On September 3, over a thousand protesters, primarily UTK students, rallied on the University of Tennessee campus. The UT Knoxville football team and other student athletes led the protesters on a march around campus to show solidarity with the Black Lives Matter movement.

=== Memphis ===
Silent demonstrations of around 40 people protesting the murder of Floyd, the killing of Breonna Taylor in Kentucky, and the murder of Ahmaud Arbery, led to "verbal confrontations" with Memphis police and two counter-protesters from the Facebook group Confederate 901. On May 27, protesters shut down Union Avenue near McLean Boulevard. Just after midnight Saturday night, police in riot gear clashed with a large crowd on Beale Street. Shelby County Commissioner Tami Sawyer, who was on scene, tweeted: "Memphis police have threatened to use lethal force if we don't leave the parking lot. They have arrested our friends. We're not leaving." On Sunday Evening May 31, the fifth straight day of protests, more riot police attempted to disperse a crowd of 100 that were occupying Main Street. A curfew went into effect in Memphis, TN, on Monday, June 1, from 22:00 to 06:00, and was extended the following day to June 8.

=== Morristown ===
On May 30, a group of around 150 protesters gathered at 9 p.m. and peacefully marched up and down Morristown's Main Street District, chanting phrases such as “I can't breathe” and “no justice, no peace.” No buildings or property in the downtown area were damaged. One counter-protester with a thin blue line flag was struck in the face and taken away by ambulance. The protesters blocked off the parking garage to the city center at around 11 p.m. where a line of police officers were stationed. The protesters threw small rocks and water bottles at the officers' feet and were ordered to disperse around 12:40 a.m. One man was arrested on June 3 for allegedly assaulting the counter-protester during the protest, as well as for felony evading arrest and reckless endangerment. The man had escaped a police chase on June 1 and fled to Arkansas.

=== Murfreesboro ===
On May 31, a group of around 50 protesters marched toward a building on the Middle Tennessee State University campus named after Ku Klux Klan leader Nathan Bedford Forrest but were stopped by police in armored vehicles. Police accused protesters of vandalizing an armored car and throwing a brick through the window of a local business. A 12-year-old girl was injured by tear gas. Mayor Shane McFarland issued a state of emergency order. A curfew was in effect as of 6:30 pm. Earlier in the day, a peaceful vigil was held at the Rutherford County Courthouse with hundreds of participants.

=== Nashville ===
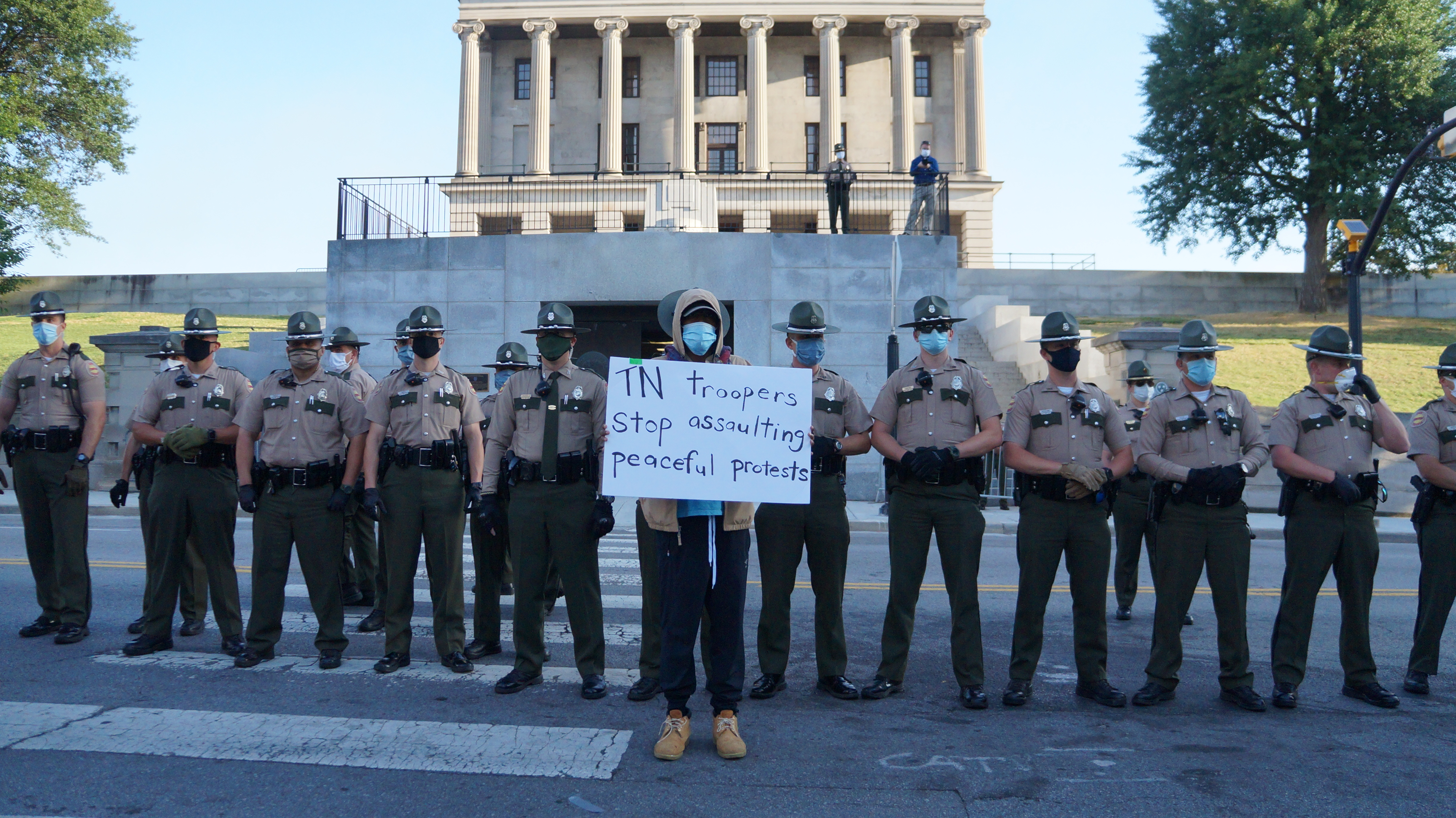
A protester poses in front of state troopers in Nashville, June 24, 2020

On May 30, thousands gathered for a protest in downtown Nashville, the capital of Tennessee; protesters peacefully demonstrated in Legislative Plaza and then marched to a police department. In the evening, the crowd damaged a police car, threw rocks and sprayed graffiti; at least 5 were arrested. Mayor John Cooper declared a state of emergency and called in the national guard after a spate of arsons, including the burning of Nashville's courthouse.

The Nashville Autonomous Zone, sometimes referred to as the Ida B. Wells Plaza, was an attempt to declare an autonomous zone on the Capitol grounds of Nashville, Tennessee. It was an attempt to mirror the Capitol Hill Autonomous Zone of Seattle, though this "zone" never actually formed and was more of an occupational protest of the Tennessee State Capitol. On June 12 local activists called for protesters to occupy the Capitol grounds, starting at 5:00 p.m. local time. Fliers circulated by organizers demanded "Fire Chief Anderson. Defund the Police. Demilitarize the Police. Remove Racist Statues." In the wake of Occupy Wall Street, the Tennessee State Legislature passed a law making the occupation of state land after 10:00 p.m. a Class A misdemeanor.

== Aftermath ==
In August 2020, Tennessee Governor Bill Lee signed legislation in response to the protests that made it a felony to participate in certain types of protest. Under the legislation, camping on state property is punishable by six years' imprisonment and the loss of the right to vote. Tennessee was the first state to pass anti-protest legislation in response to the George Floyd protests.
