= Legislative Plaza =

Public space and building in Nashville, Tennessee, United States

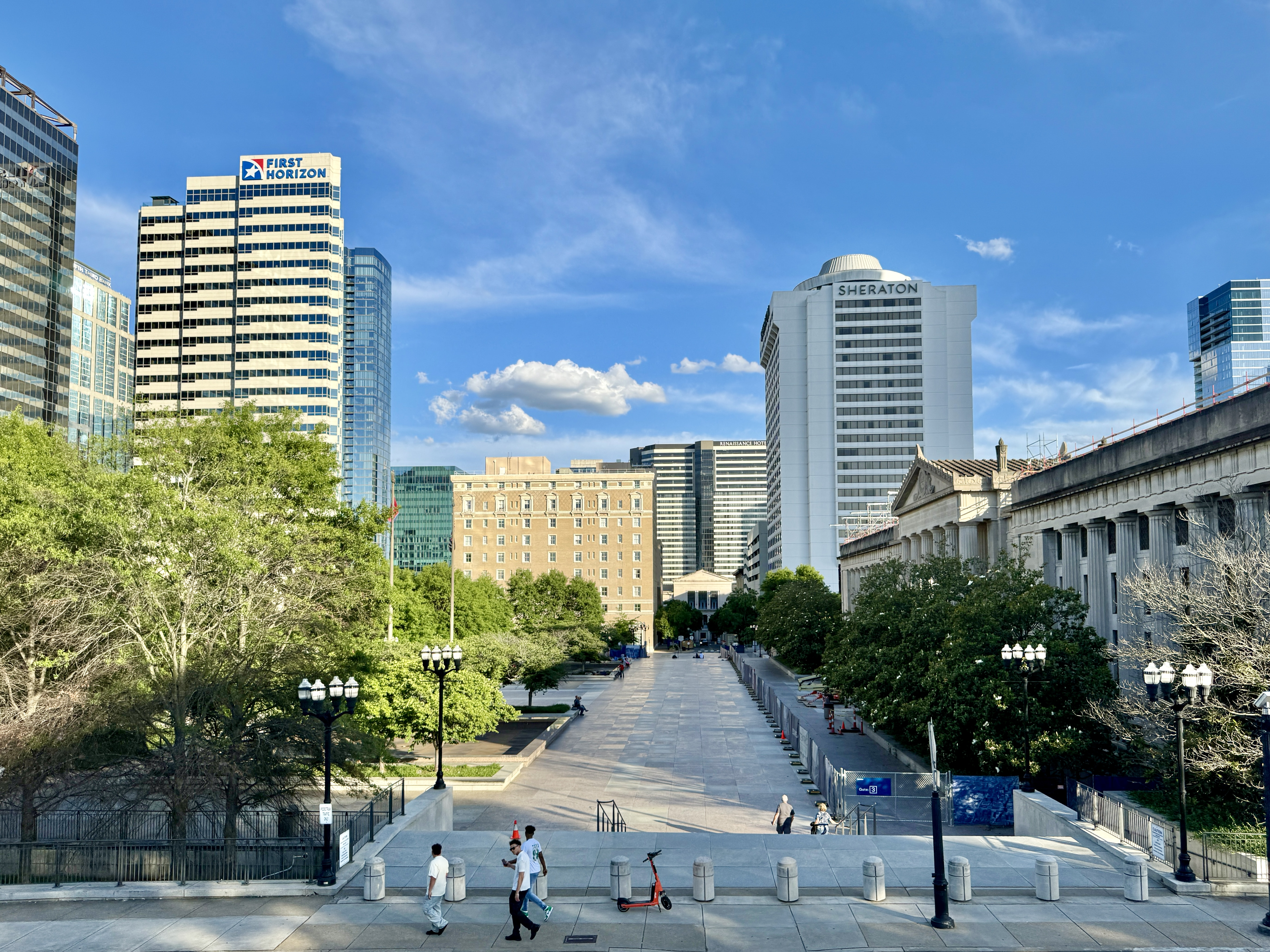
- Legislative Plaza, looking south from the steps to the Tennessee State Capitol.
- Interactive map of Legislative Plaza
- Type: Public plaza, subterranean office building
- Location: 301 6th Avenue North, Nashville, Tennessee, United States
- Coordinates: 36.164664°N 86.7836936°W
- Created: 1974
- Operator: Tennessee Department of General Services
- Open: Year-round

Legislative Plaza, also known as War Memorial Plaza, is an outdoor public plaza and subterranean office complex in Nashville, Tennessee, United States. The open-air space is located next to the War Memorial Building, and is separated from the James K. Polk State Office Building, Tennessee Performing Arts Center, and Rachel Jackson State Office Building by 6th Avenue. The plaza is situated adjacent to the Tennessee State Capitol to the north, and is considered part of the state capitol complex and an extension of the capitol grounds. It contains statues, plaques, and other monuments that honor and memorialize Tennesseans who served and died in various wars throughout the state's history, and a memorial wall to law enforcement officers from Tennessee killed in the line of duty. Three levels of office space for state legislators and parking decks are located beneath the plaza, and are connected to the War Memorial Building via an underground tunnel.

Legislative Plaza was constructed between 1971 and 1975 to meet the demands of the growing state government, and replaced an older outdoor plaza that was constructed with the War Memorial Building in the 1920s. The structure struggled with flooding and water damaged issues, and the office level was renovated and refurbished in the mid-2000s. A major renovation of the structure began in 2023, and is expected to be completed in 2027. This will include conversion of the office space into a new visitor center for the state capitol, military museum, and a conference center. Memorials have been placed on the site since its opening, and the plaza is a popular site for public events and political gatherings, demonstrations, and protests.

== Description ==
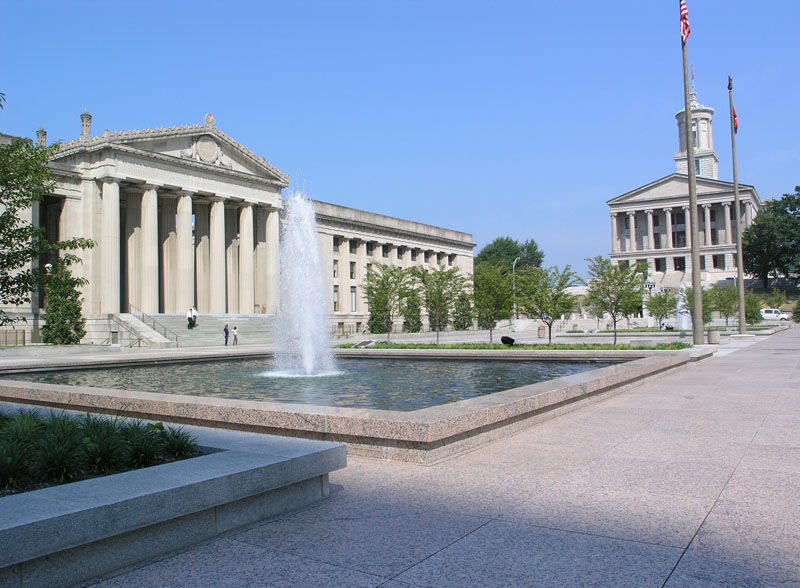
The south fountain at Legislative Plaza with the War Memorial Building and the Tennessee State Capitol in the background.

Legislative Plaza is located in downtown Nashville, Tennessee, slightly above or below the natural slope of the ground. It is bounded by the War Memorial Building on the west, Dr. Martin Luther King Jr. Boulevard on the north, 6th Avenue on the east, and Union Street on the south. It is oriented in a roughly north-northwest to south-southeast direction. The rectangular facility consists of an open plaza, officially named War Memorial Plaza, atop a three-story subterranean office building and parking garage, officially named Legislative Plaza. Both the above-ground plaza and the underground structure are most commonly referred to as Legislative Plaza, however. A short downward staircase provides access to the plaza on the north end from MLK Boulevard. This connects to a pedestrian crosswalk that crosses this street to the Motlow Tunnel and the south entrance to the state capitol. Due to its proximity, Legislative Plaza and its monuments and memorials are often considered an extension of the capitol grounds. Legislative Plaza is maintained by the State of Tennessee Real Estate Asset Management division of the Tennessee Department of General Services.

On the south end, a short upward staircase provides access from Union Street. A longer upward staircase provides access to the plaza from 6th Avenue across from an intersection with Deaderick Street. A wide pedestrian bridge connects the plaza to the Tennessee Performing Arts Center and James K. Polk State Office Building across 6th Avenue. The Rachel Jackson State Office Building is also situated across 6th Avenue from the plaza. The Hermitage Hotel and Sheraton Nashville Downtown are across from the plaza on Union Street. Retaining walls support the plaza above the grade of 6th Avenue and Union Street; On the north end, the plaza is slightly below grade. The west side of the plaza consists of a wide concrete, marble, and granite pedestrian walkway. The front of the War Memorial Building is accessible by a wide staircase approximately midway along this side. A narrow strip of the plaza called the Vietnam Veterans Plaza extends between the south end of the War Memorial Building and Union Street. The American flag and Tennessee flag are permanently flown at Legislative Plaza, with the flag of the Tennessee General Assembly displayed when the legislature is in session. The POW/MIA flag is also displayed at the plaza.

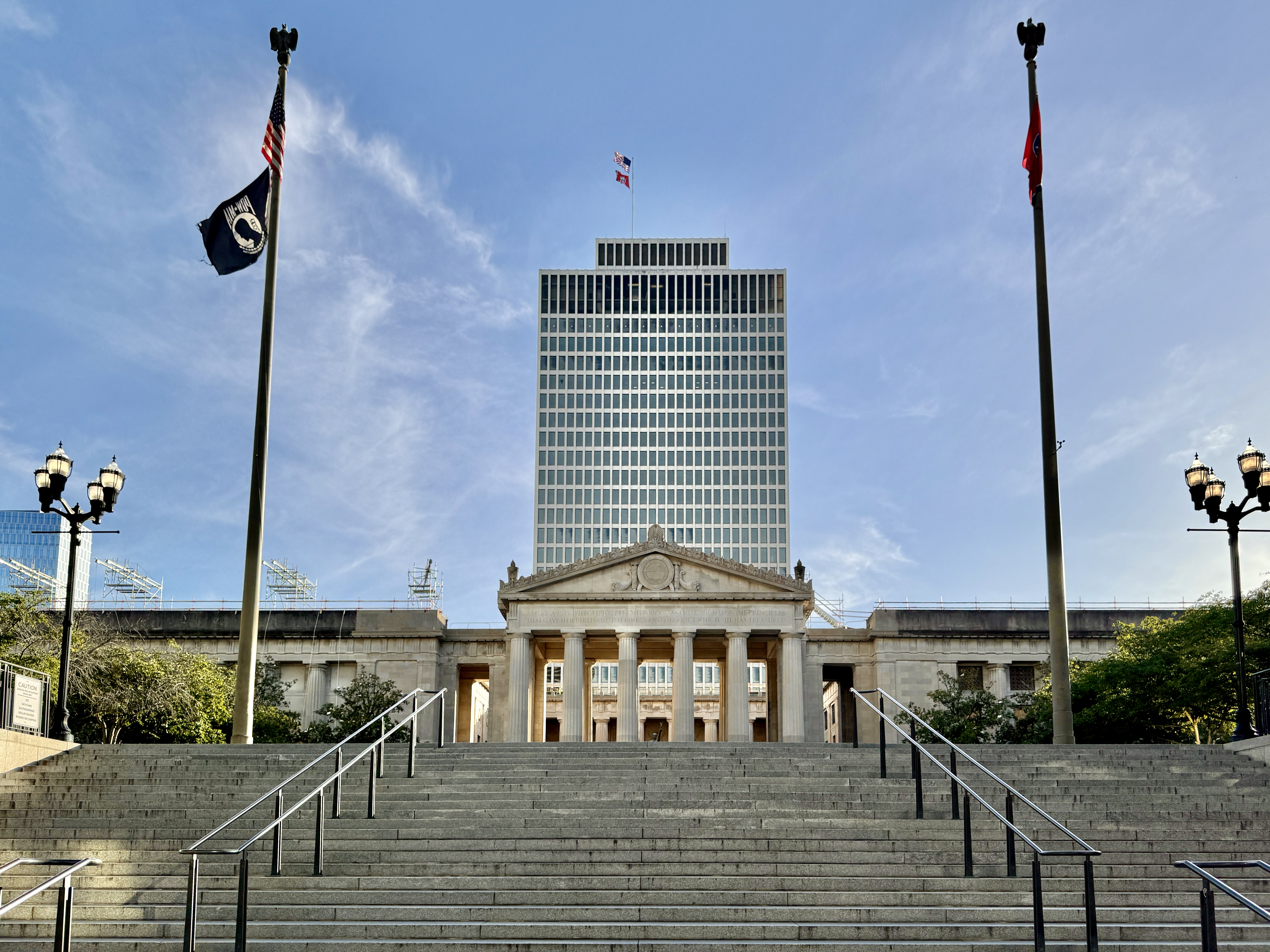
View of the 6th Avenue entrance to Legislative Plaza with the War Memorial Building and the William R. Snodgrass Tennessee Tower visible in the background.

The plaza has two large square fountains; one on the northeast side, and another just south of the midpoint on the east side. The northeast and southeast corners of the plaza are surrounded by large planters with trees, shrubs, and flowers, and additional parts of the plaza are landscaped. The memorials are located on the east side of the plaza near the fountains and landscaping. Near the southeast corner of the plaza, the top level is open to the ground below, and this is accessible from a staircase to the top level and from 6th Avenue. The below-grade portion of the structure consists of three levels. The first level, which is partially below grade on the south end, contains office space for state legislators and other government officials. Additional rooms include committee offices and hearing rooms, a cafeteria, and rooms for the press. The Nashville District Energy System provides heating and cooling to this part of the building. Below this floor is a two-level parking garage. This structure is accessible from 6th Avenue. A tunnel and elevator connect the subterranean structure to the War Memorial Building, and an escalator connects to the Motlow Tunnel to provide unimpeded access to the state capitol.

=== Monuments and memorials ===
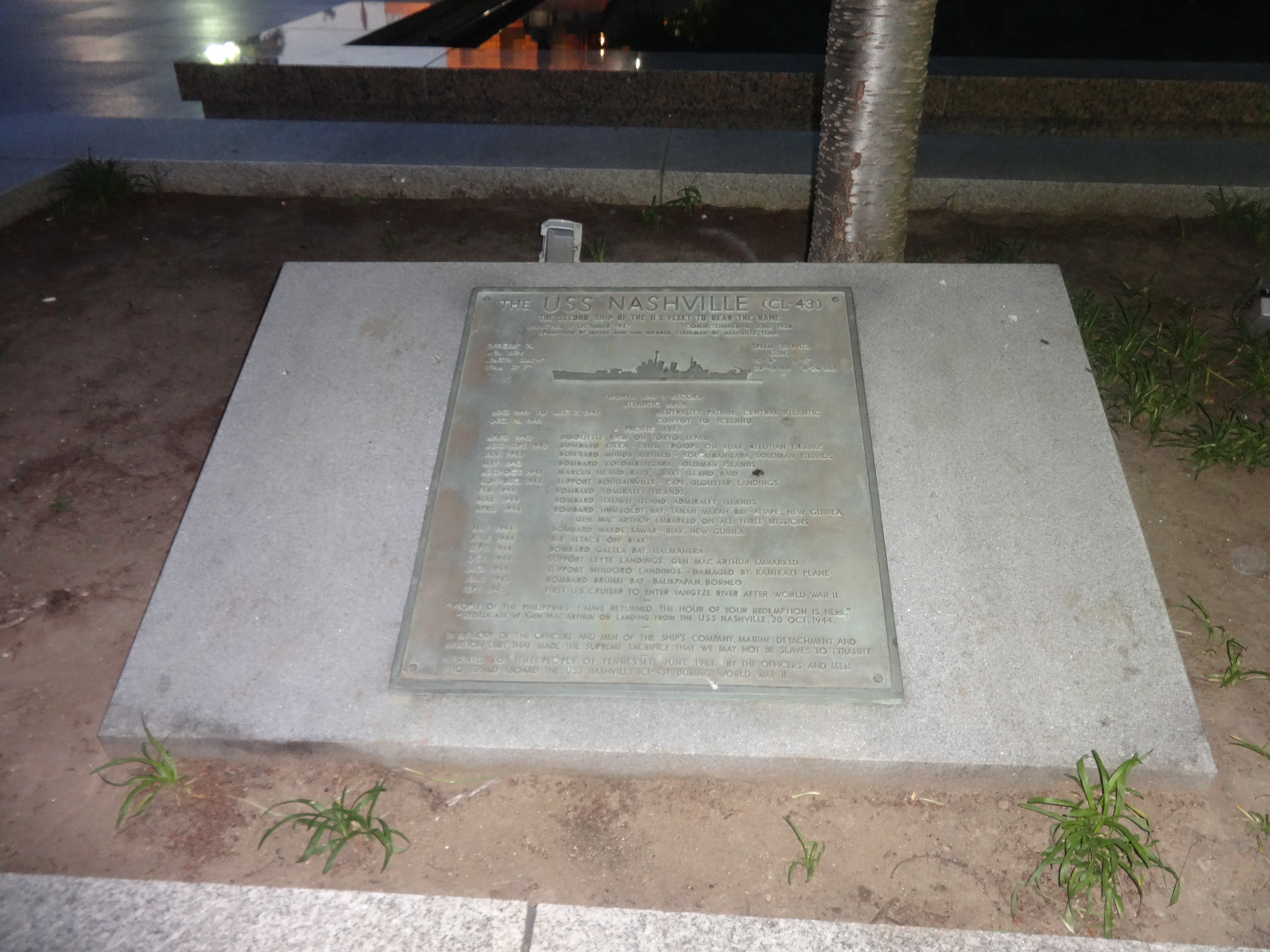
USS Nashville (CL-43) plaque.

Monuments commemorating the service of Tennesseans on the capitol grounds began in 1909. While additional ones have been installed since then, most war monuments and memorials have been placed at Legislative Plaza and its predecessor since the War Memorial Building's completion in 1925. This building was built to memorialize Tennessee servicemembers who died in World War I. These monuments have helped cement the plaza as an extension of the capitol grounds.

The north side of the north fountain contains three commemorative plaques. The first one honors the service of the crew of the USS Nashville (CL-43) during World War II. It was installed during a reunion of the crew's veterans in June 1983. Adjacent to this is a Blue Star Memorial By-Way plaque, which was presented by National Garden Clubs, Inc. A plaque to the right of this recognizes the site of Andrew Johnson's house during his term as Military Governor of Tennessee, and was placed by Woodmen of the World.

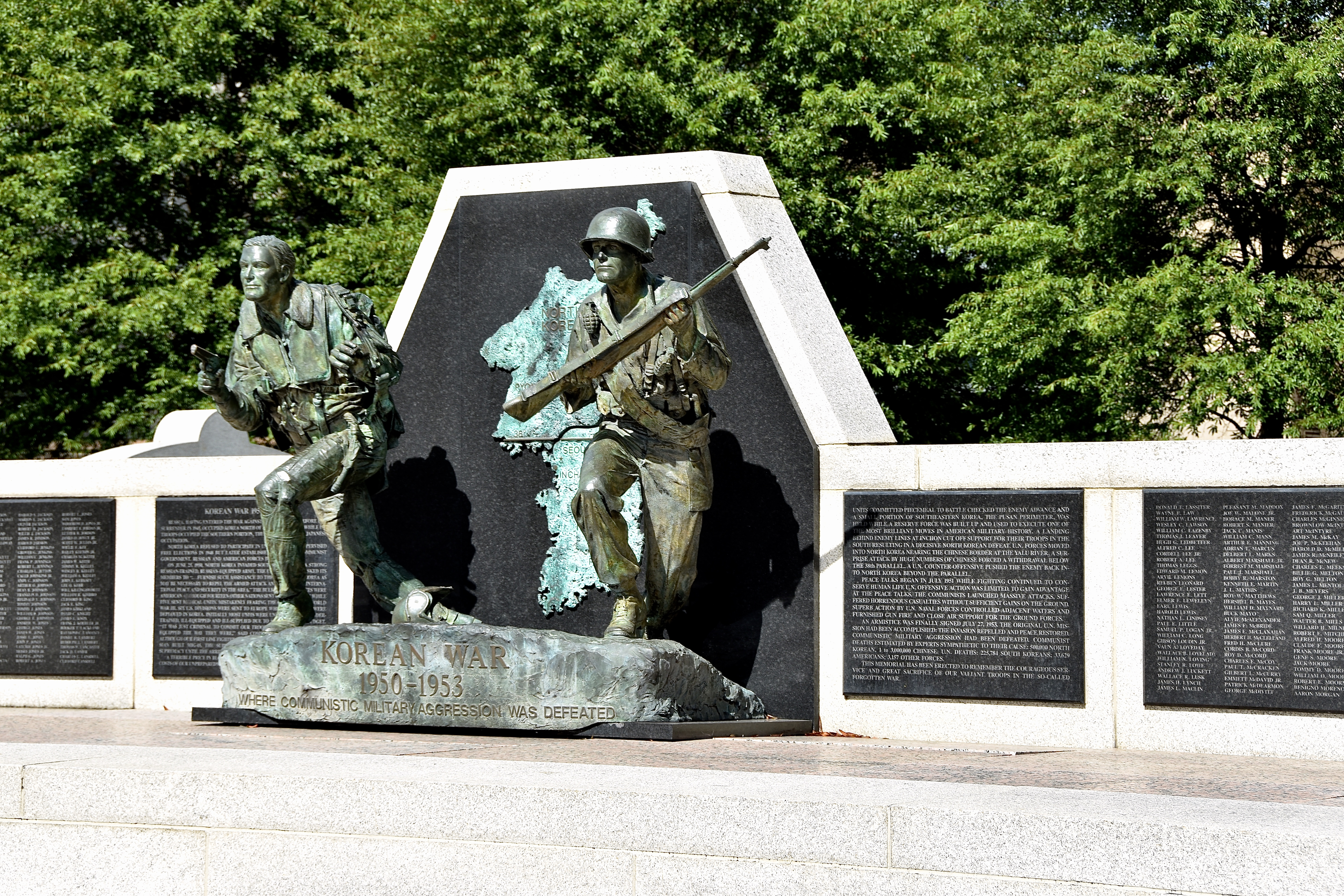
Korean War Memorial Wall and Statue.

The north side of the south fountain also has three plaques. Near the northwest corner is a plaque that honors the U.S. Navy Submarines still on patrol. A nearby plaque memorializes 31 Tennessee Air National Guard members who died in a plane crash on July 23, 1950. It was erected by the Nashville Banner. A plaque on the northeast corner honors all United States Merchant Marines who have served since 1775. It was installed in July 1999. The Purple Heart memorial is a plaque on the southwest corner of this fountain that honors all Tennesseans who have received a Purple Heart. The Korean War Memorial Wall and Statue consists of a bronze statue by sculptor Russ Faxon. This statue depicts a rifleman representing the Army and Marines, and an airman representing the Air Force and Navy. Behind this is a black granite wall with a bronze casting of the Korean peninsula and six plaques listing the names of the Tennesseans who died in the Korean War. It was dedicated on July 4, 1992. Nearby is the State Officers Memorial Wall, which honors law enforcement officers from Tennessee who died in the line of duty. This memorial was dedicated on May 17, 2000, by the local chapter of the National Fraternal Order of Police.

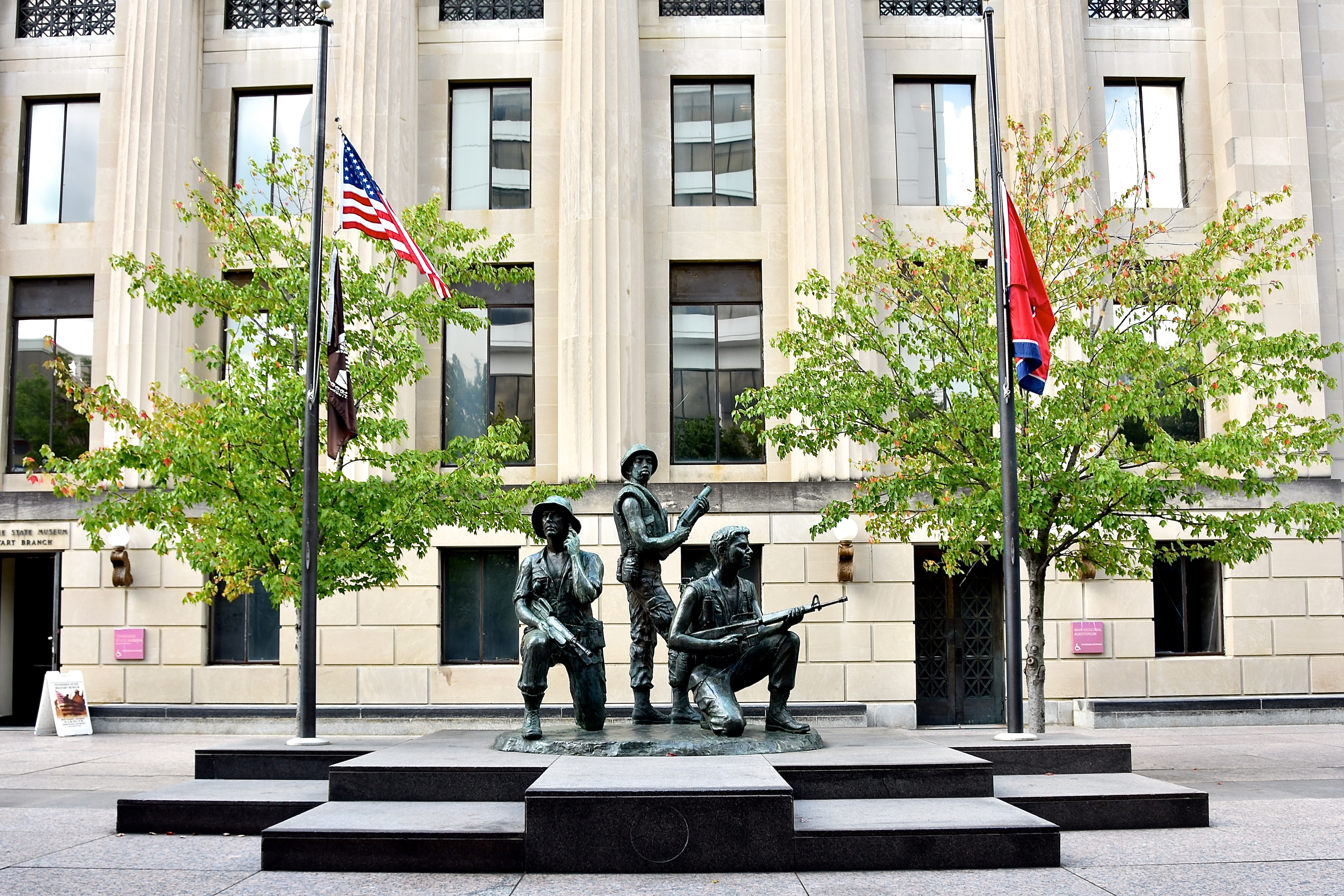
Statue at Vietnam Veterans Plaza

The southeast extension of the plaza, which is located adjacent to the south end of the War Memorial Plaza, is called Vietnam Veterans Plaza. This plaza contains three markers that commemorate the role of Tennessee in the Vietnam War. A plaque provides an overview of the plaza's history. The Vietnam War Memorial Wall lists the names of 1,289 Tennesseans who died in the Vietnam War. It was dedicated on Veterans Day, November 10, 1985. Nearby is a bronze statue, sculpted by Alan LeQuire, that depicts three soldiers representing servicemembers from the three Grand Divisions of Tennessee. This statue also includes one of the first depictions of an African American on state property in Tennessee. A time capsule is buried beneath the statue. It was dedicated on Memorial Day, May 26, 1986.

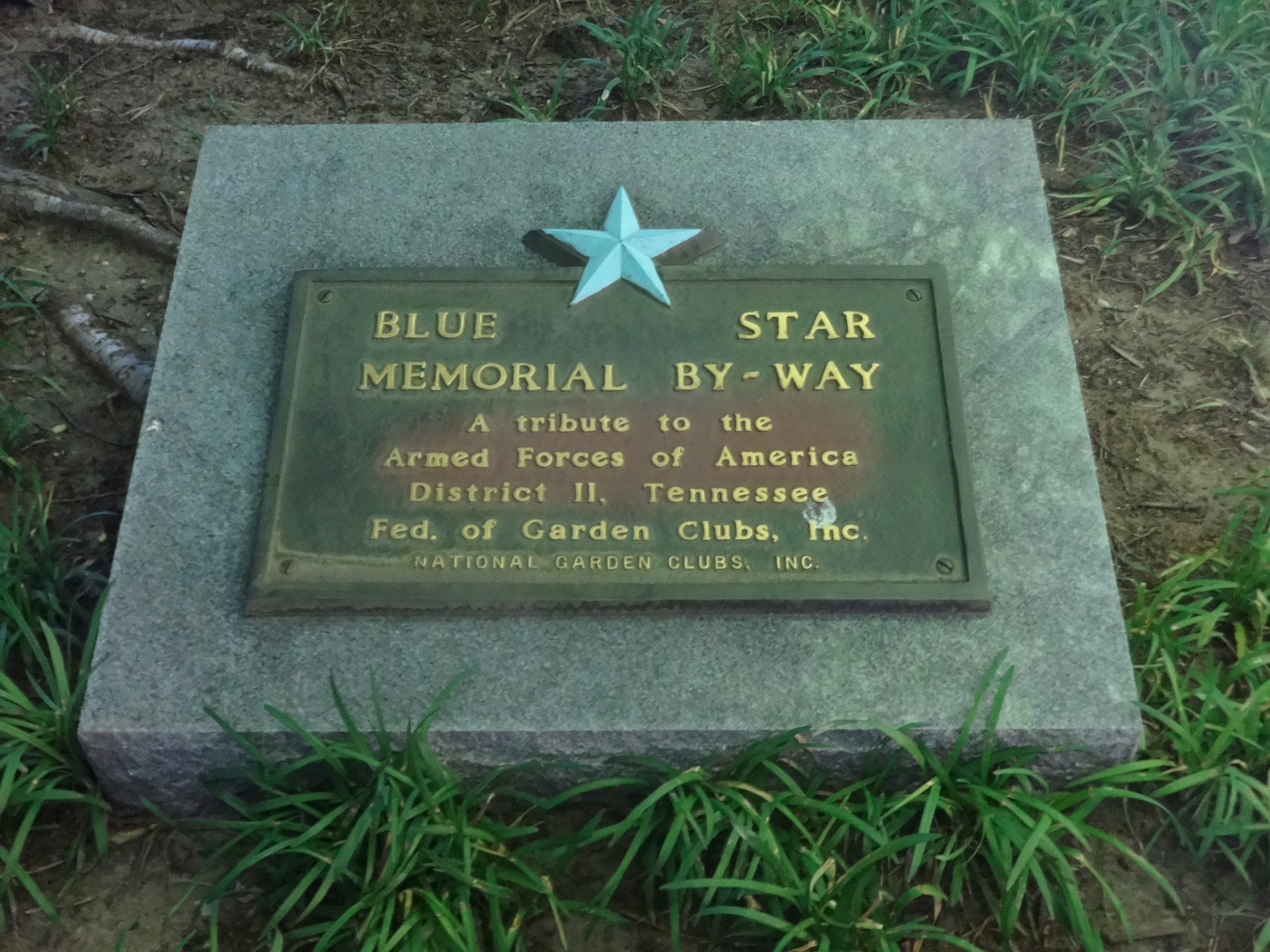
Blue Star Memorial By-Way monument.

The oldest monument at Legislative Plaza, the Tennessee Confederate Women's Monument, is also on the northwest corner of the Vietnam Veterans Plaza. This statue commemorates the work of Confederate women during the American Civil War, and was erected by the United Confederate Veterans. It was sculpted by Belle Kinney Scholz, and dedicated on October 10, 1926. The Gulf War and Global War on Terrorism Monument is the newest monument at Legislative Plaza. It was dedicated on September 11, 2019, the 18th anniversary of the September 11 attacks, and honors Tennesseans who served and died in the Gulf War, Iraq War, and the War on Terror.

== History ==
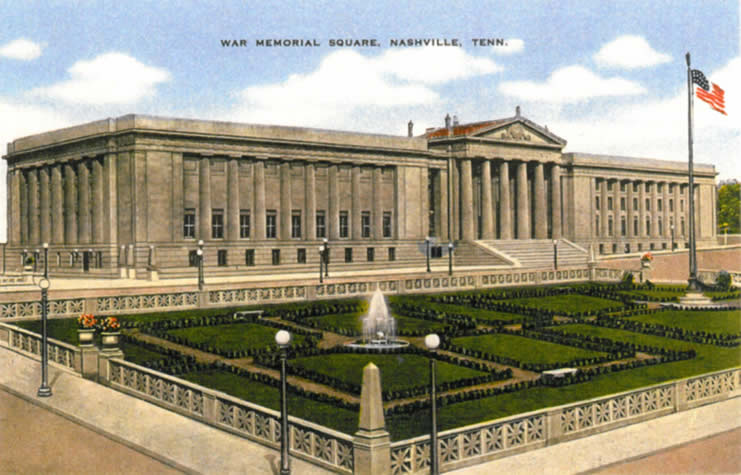
The original War Memorial Plaza.

When the War Memorial Building was built in 1925, an open area consisting of a courtyard and fountain was built to the east. This became known as "Victory Square", "Victory Plaza", "Memorial Square", "War Memorial Plaza", and other names. In 1958, the Nashville Chamber of Commerce was asked to survey the site for a potential redevelopment called "Presidential Plaza". As the state government grew in the mid-to-latter 20th century, additional office space was constructed in the area. The redevelopment of the original plaza was planned for many years, and in 1969 drew criticism from the American Legion Post 5 and Veterans of World War I of the USA. That year, the title of the site was returned from the city of Nashville to the state government. The facility was designed by Steinbaugh, Harwood, and Rogers. Preliminary construction began in September 1971, with completion originally slated for January 1974. By September 1974, the above-ground plaza was nearly complete, and organizations began using it for special events. The state legislature began moving into the complex on January 1, 1975, and final work was finished over the next few weeks. The final cost was approximately $8 million. (Note: Equivalent to $37.1 million in 2025)

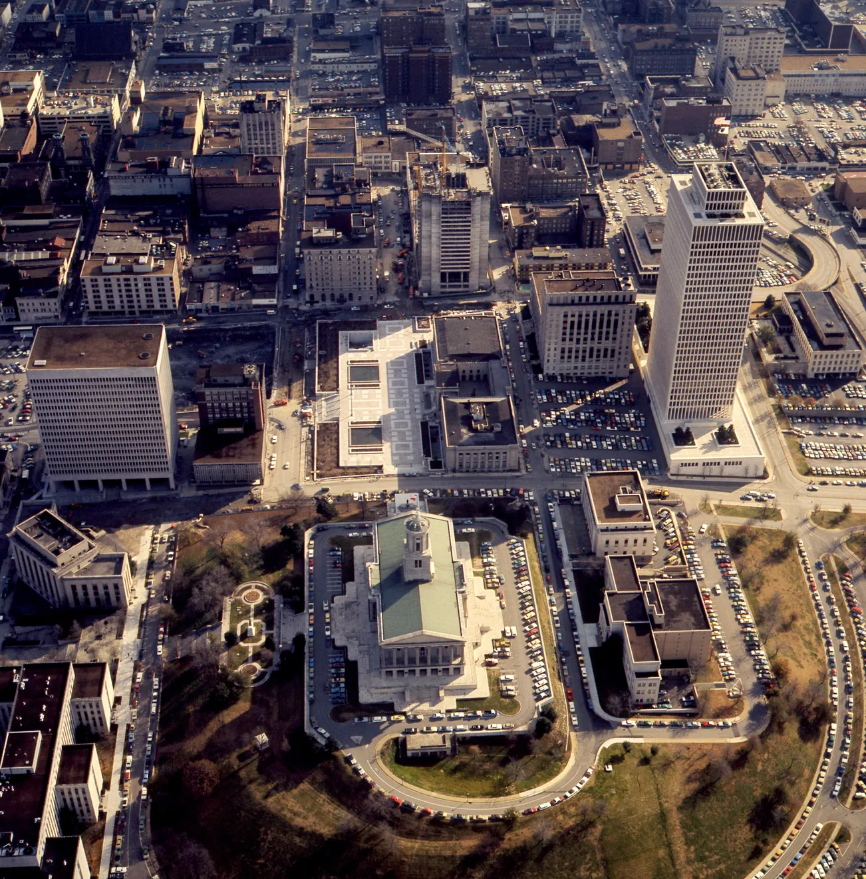
Aerial view of downtown Nashville in December 1974 with Legislative Plaza effectively complete.

Before the construction of Legislative Plaza, there was a severe shortage of offices and committee rooms, and scheduling was often a source of frustration and confusion for lawmakers. Members of the general assembly were often forced to work out of their hotel rooms. The new office complex was credited with enabling the legislature to develop a more coordinated response to legislation and budgets. It also provided more space for the legislature to hire additional professional staff. It was one of the most spacious state legislative facilities in the United States at the time of its completion. In 1979, the pedestrian bridge across 6th Avenue was constructed to provide access to the then-under construction James K. Polk State Office Building and Tennessee Performing Arts Center. Despite its early successes, the underground complex struggled with flooding, water damage, and mold issues from its early years. The public plaza part of the structure was officially named War Memorial Plaza by the state legislature in 1995; however, the entire structure continues to be most commonly referred to as Legislative Plaza. In 2001, the state legislature banned smoking in the office complex after several years of failed attempts to do so. This was one of the last state facilities where smoking was banned. On December 23, 2003, repairs were completed on the fountains, and they were turned back on after nearly two years of sitting empty. Lights were installed in the fountains for the first time as part of this work.

By the 2000s, the water damage, mold, and cigarette smoke residue were so severe that the state began a multi-phase renovation and rehabilitation of the structure. The problem became so severe that parts of the subterranean complex were closed off to the public in early 2004, and contractors were hired to clean 40 areas with high mold levels. Dehumidifiers and air filters were installed as a temporary solution. The fountains were rehabilitated in the spring of 2004 with new linings. In early June 2004, the next project began with temporary relocation of the plaza surface slabs to allow repairs to leaks in the ceilings in the offices below. This included replacement of a plastic waterproofing membrane with a new membrane made of rubberized asphalt sandwiched around a fiberglass sheet. As part of this work, the magnolia, willow oak, and Bradford pear trees on the plaza, whose roots had contributed to the leakage problem, were felled, and new cherry trees were planted. Inside the structure, water damage was repaired, carpet was replaced, and the walls were repainted. The interior work was completed in January 2005, and the plaza work was finished in the summer for $8.2 million. (Note: Equivalent to $13 million in 2025) The next renovation project upgraded the hearing rooms and offices with new wood trim, improved lighting, climate controls, sound systems, more seating for the public, and installed wireless internet for the first time and new multi-media presentation systems. It was completed in January 2006 at a cost of $3 million. (Note: Equivalent to $4.6 million in 2025) This phase went over budget by $1.5 million, (Note: Equivalent to $2.3 million in 2025) reportedly due to change orders. Part of the project was criticized as pork barrel spending by the Tennessee Center For Policy Research and Citizens Against Government Waste in an April 2006 report. Criticism was particularly directed at the senate's "cloakroom" with new expensive chairs and an expensive flat screen television, which was an emerging technology at the time. The final phase, completed in late 2006 at $2.2 million, (Note: Equivalent to $3.38 million in 2025) repaired the damaged elevators and escalators. While two of the senate rooms were made compliant with the Americans With Disabilities Act (ADA) in 2005, disability advocates noted in early 2007 that most of the facility was still not ADA compliant.

In 2014, the electrical system in Legislative Plaza was upgraded, which included installing light switches in the offices for the first time. Prior to this, the lights were kept on all the time, costing an estimated $300,000 extra per year. (Note: Equivalent to $401,307 in 2025) Some offices were relocated to the Cordell Hull State Office Building when a renovation was completed there in 2017. The fountains were reportedly last used in 2021. In the summer of 2023, work began on a $126 million renovation of Legislative Plaza. The project consists of the replacement of some of the surface, removal of the fountains, expanded walking space, and renovations to the War Memorial Building and Motlow Tunnel. As part of this work, the office level of the subterranean building will be renovated in to a new visitors center for the state capitol, the new location for the Tennessee State Military Museum, and a conference center. New office space for veterans groups, the Tennessee Historical Society and other organizations will also be constructed on this level. The second phase began in January 2025, and final work is expected to be complete in January 2027.
