= Memorial Auditorium =

Memorial Auditorium may refer to:

- Buffalo Memorial Auditorium, Buffalo, New York
- Burlington Memorial Auditorium, Burlington, Vermont
- Greenville Memorial Auditorium, Greenville, South Carolina, 1958–1997
- Kitchener Memorial Auditorium Complex ("The Aud"), Kitchener, Ontario
- Sacramento Memorial Auditorium, Sacramento, California
- Memorial Auditorium (Louisville, Kentucky)
- Memorial Auditorium (Moorhead, Minnesota)
- Raleigh Memorial Auditorium, part of the Duke Energy Center for the Performing Arts in Raleigh, North Carolina
- Soldiers and Sailors Memorial Auditorium, Chattanooga, Tennessee
- Soldiers and Sailors Memorial Hall, Pittsburgh, Pennsylvania
- Stanford Memorial Auditorium, Stanford University, Stanford, California
- Utica Memorial Auditorium, Utica, New York
- War Memorial Auditorium (Nashville, Tennessee), Nashville, Tennessee

== See also ==
- Veterans Memorial Auditorium (disambiguation)
- War Memorial Auditorium (disambiguation)
