= Cordell Hull State Office Building =

Building in Nashville, Tennessee, US

Coordinates: 36.167°N 86.783°W

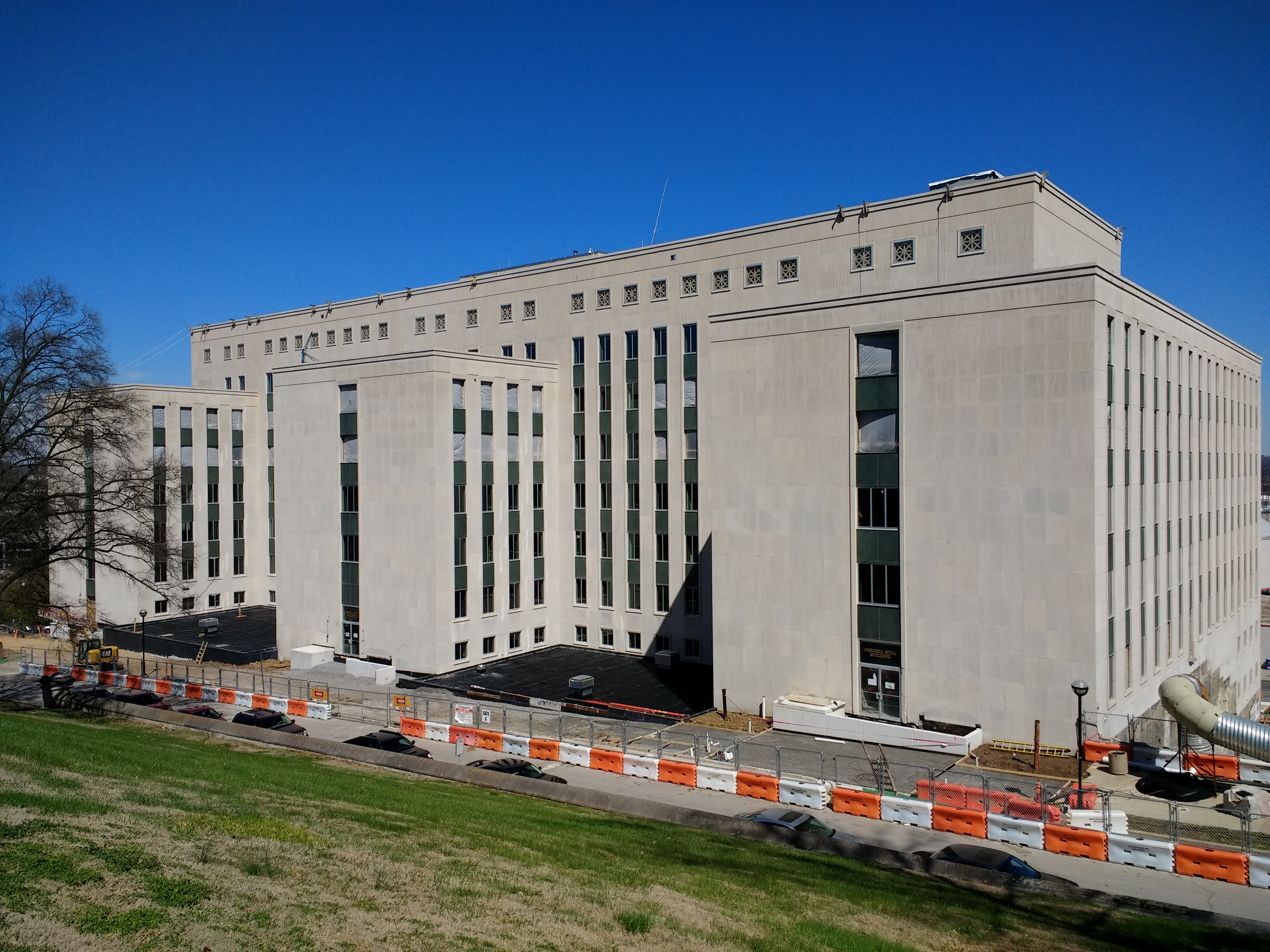
- Interactive map of the Cordell Hull State Office Building area

General information
- Status: Completed
- Location: 425 5th Avenue North, Nashville, Tennessee, USA
- Construction started: 1952
- Completed: 1954

Technical details
- Floor count: 10

The Cordell Hull State Office Building is a historic building in Nashville, Tennessee.

== Location ==
The building is located on the grounds of the Tennessee State Capitol, at 425 Rep. John Lewis Way North in Nashville, Tennessee.

== History ==
The building was constructed from 1952 to 1954. It is 120 feet in height, an area of 348,606 square feet, with ten stories. It was designed in the Art Deco architectural style. It was named in honor of Cordell Hull (1871–1955), a Tennessean who served as the 47th United States Secretary of State from 1933 to 1944, under President Franklin D. Roosevelt.

In 2013, Jones Lang LaSalle (NYSE: JLL) suggested it should be demolished, although the plan was questioned by journalists and preservationists. After a petition from preservationists and a study by Centric Architecture suggesting it would cost more to demolish it and build a new building instead of refurbishing it, it was stalled.

It was announced in 2015 that the Cordell Hull Building would be renovated, and the Legislature would move its scattered offices from the Legislative Plaza, War Memorial Building, and Rachel Jackson Building. A new tunnel to connect Cordell Hull to the Capitol was under construction in 2016. Projected completion for the entire project was Fall 2017.
