= War Memorial (disambiguation) =

A war memorial is a monument, or other edifice, to celebrate a war or victory, or to commemorate those who died or were injured in a war.

War Memorial may also refer to:

== Memorials ==
- War Memorial to the Unknown Soldier, Victoria, British Columbia, Canada
- War Memorial of Montreal West, Quebec, Canada
- War Memorial, Portland, on the Isle of Portland, Dorset, England
- War Memorial, Lancaster Cemetery, Lancashire, England
- War Memorial (Poulton-le-Fylde), Lancashire, England
- War Memorial (Thornton-Cleveleys), Lancashire, England
- War Memorial, Stanwick, North Northamptonshire, England
- War Memorial, Mells, in Somerset, England
- War Memorial (Falkland Islands), in Stanley, Falkland Islands
- War memorials (Western Somme), near Abbeville, France
- War Memorial, Chennai, or Victory War Memorial, in Chennai, India
- War Memorial (Floriana), Malta
- War Memorial of Brugherio, Italy
- War Memorial of Musocco, Milan, Italy
- War Memorial of Korea, in Seoul, Korea
- War Memorial of Mid America, Bardstown, Kentucky, United States
- War Memorial (Oregon, Illinois), United States
- War Memorial Arena (Syracuse), New York, United States
- War Memorial of the Royal Monmouthshire Royal Engineers, Wales

== Other uses ==
- War Memorial (album), a 1973 album by Pink Floyd
- War Memorials (Local Authorities' Powers) Act 1923, an Act of Parliament in the United Kingdom

== See also ==
- War Memorial Auditorium (disambiguation)
- War Memorial Building (disambiguation)
- War Memorial Gymnasium (disambiguation)
- War Memorial Park (disambiguation)
- War Memorial Stadium (disambiguation)
