= Memorial Field =

Memorial Field may refer to:

== Airports ==
- Memorial Field Airport, serving Hot Springs, Arkansas, United States (FAA: HOT)
- Archer Memorial Field, serving St. Johns, Michigan, United States (FAA: 2S3)
- Chapman Memorial Field, serving Centerburg, Ohio, United States (FAA: 6CM)
- Dexter B. Florence Memorial Field, serving of Arkadelphia, Arkansas, United States (FAA: M89)
- Ed Carlson Memorial Field, also known as South Lewis County Airport, serving Toledo/Winlock, Washington, United States (FAA: TDO)
- Frankfort Dow Memorial Field, serving Frankfort, Michigan, United States (FAA: FKS)
- H. A. Clark Memorial Field, serving Williams, Arizona, United States (FAA: CRM)
- James G. Whiting Memorial Field, serving Mapleton, Iowa, United States (FAA: MEY)
- Karl Stefan Memorial Field, also known as Norfolk Regional Airport, serving Norfolk, Nebraska, United States (FAA: OFK)
- Kevin Burke Memorial Field, also known as Anita Municipal Airport, serving Anita, Iowa, United States (FAA: Y43)
- Lenzen-Roe Memorial Field, also known as Granite Falls Municipal Airport, serving Granite Falls, Minnesota, United States (FAA: GDB)
- Miley Memorial Field, serving Big Piney/Marbleton, Wyoming, United States (FAA: BPI)
- Noble F. Lee Memorial Field, also known as Lakeland Airport, serving Minocqua/Woodruff, Wisconsin, United States (FAA: ARV)

== Sporting ==
- Kearney Memorial Field, baseball field for University of Nebraska at Kearney
- Memorial Field (Dartmouth), the football field at Dartmouth College
- Alumni Memorial Field, the football field at the Virginia Military Institute
- Memorial Field (New Jersey), running track in Morristown, New Jersey and the site of the women's 1958 USA Outdoor Track and Field Championships

== See also ==
- Memorial Coliseum (disambiguation)
- Memorial Gymnasium (disambiguation)
- Memorial Park (disambiguation)
- Memorial Stadium (disambiguation)
