= Veterans Memorial Park =

Veterans Memorial Park may refer to:

- Veterans Memorial Park (Auburn, New York)
- Veterans Memorial Park (Bay City, Michigan)
- Veterans Memorial Park (Beaverton, Oregon)
- Veterans Memorial Park (Boise, Idaho)
- Veterans Memorial Park (Davenport, Iowa)
- Veterans Memorial Park (Leesburg, Florida)
- Veterans Memorial Park (New Castle, Delaware)
- Veterans Memorial Park (Port St. Lucie, Florida)
- Veterans Memorial Park (St. Louis), Missouri, a park in Greater St. Louis
- Eagle Field at Veterans Memorial Park, Harrisonburg, Virginia
- Klamath Falls Veterans Memorial Park, Klamath Falls, Oregon
- Little Falls Veterans Memorial Park, Little Falls, New York
- Seekonk Veterans Memorial Park, Seekonk, Massachusetts
- Vietnam Veterans Memorial State Park, Angel Fire, New Mexico
- Veterans Memorial Community Regional Park, Sylmar, Los Angeles, California

== See also ==
- Veterans Park (disambiguation)
