= Veterans Memorial Auditorium =

Veterans Memorial Auditorium may refer to:

- Veterans Memorial Auditorium (Des Moines, Iowa), previous home arena of the Iowa Barnstormers
- Veterans Memorial Auditorium (Columbus, Ohio)
- Veterans Memorial Auditorium (Providence, Rhode Island)

== See also ==
- Memorial Auditorium (disambiguation)
- War Memorial Auditorium (disambiguation)
