= Bruce Crabtree =

American architect and politician

- Born: Bruce Isbester Crabtree Jr. September 1, 1923; Chattanooga, Tennessee, U.S.
- Died: May 3, 2014 (aged 90)
- Education: Vanderbilt University; Clemson University; Virginia Polytechnic Institute
- Occupations: Architect, politician
- Spouse: Dolly Nance Fischer
- Children: 5

Bruce Crabtree (September 1, 1923 – May 3, 2014) was an American architect and politician. He designed many buildings in Nashville, Tennessee, including the Andrew Jackson State Office Building and the James K. Polk State Office Building. He served as the vice mayor of Belle Meade, Tennessee.

== Early life ==
Crabtree was born on September 1, 1923, in Chattanooga, Tennessee. He attended Vanderbilt University in 1942, Clemson University in 1943–1944, and the Virginia Polytechnic Institute, where he earned a bachelor's degree in architecture in 1948.

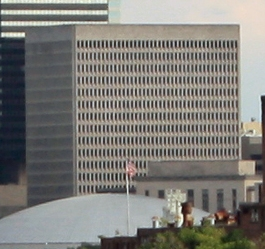
The Andrew Jackson State Office Building, designed by Taylor & Crabtree.

== Career ==
Crabtree co-founded the architectural firm Taylor & Crabtree in 1952. They designed Ben West Library (then the Nashville Public Library) in 1966, the Andrew Jackson State Office Building in 1969, the James K. Polk State Office Building in 1981, and the Rachel Jackson State Office Building in 1985. He was elected as a fellow of the American Institute of Architects in 1983. With fellow architects David and Ed Johnson, Crabtree co-founded Johnson Johnson Crabtree Architects, another architectural firm, in 1991. Crabtree also designed the St. Henry Catholic Church.

Crabtree first served on the planning zoning boards of Belle Meade, Tennessee, where he was the chairman of the zoning board of appeals for six years. In 1988, he succeeded John Clay as interim commissioner of Belle Meade, Tennessee, and he was elected in November of the same year. He served as its vice mayor by 1992. He "shaped the community and rewrote its zoning ordinance", and made it look like "an almost Norman Rockwellesque community" according to his son.

Crabtree was awarded the Medal of Merit by the Tennessee Society of Architects.

== Personal life and death ==
Crabtree married Dolly Nance Fischer in 1948. They had five children. They resided in Belle Meade.

Crabtree died on May 3, 2014. His funeral was held at the St. Henry Catholic Church in Nashville.
