= Andrew Jackson State Office Building =

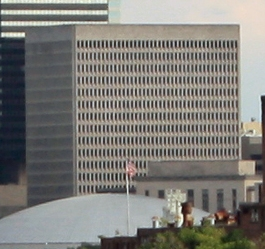
- Interactive map of the Andrew Jackson State Office Building area

General information
- Location: Nashville, United States
- Coordinates: 36.16540228391189°N 86.78221465568322°W
- Completed: 1969

Design and construction
- Architects: Taylor & Crabtree

Andrew Jackson State Office Building is a skyscraper in Nashville, Tennessee, U.S.. It was designed in the International Style by Taylor & Crabtree, and completed in 1969. Its construction cost $10 million (equivalent to $65.4 million in 2024).

Initial tenants in 1970 included the "Tennessee Department of Personnel, Revenue and Corrections, Higher Education Commission, Industrial Development, and some branches of the State's Comptroller's Office" as well as the Tennessee Department of Safety.

It was named for President Andrew Jackson. The adjacent Rachel Jackson State Office Building is named for the first lady.
