= Tennessee Department of Transportation =

Department of transportation for the U.S. state of Tennessee

Tennessee Department of Transportation (TDOT)
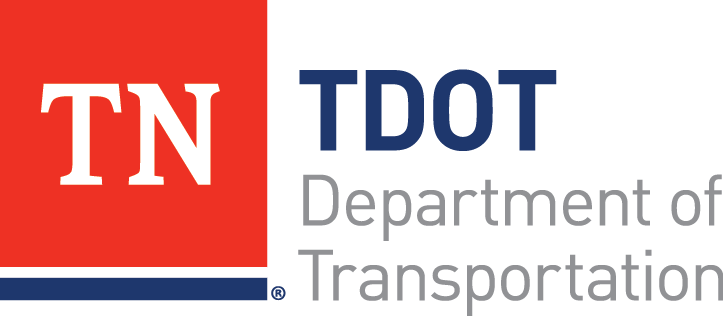

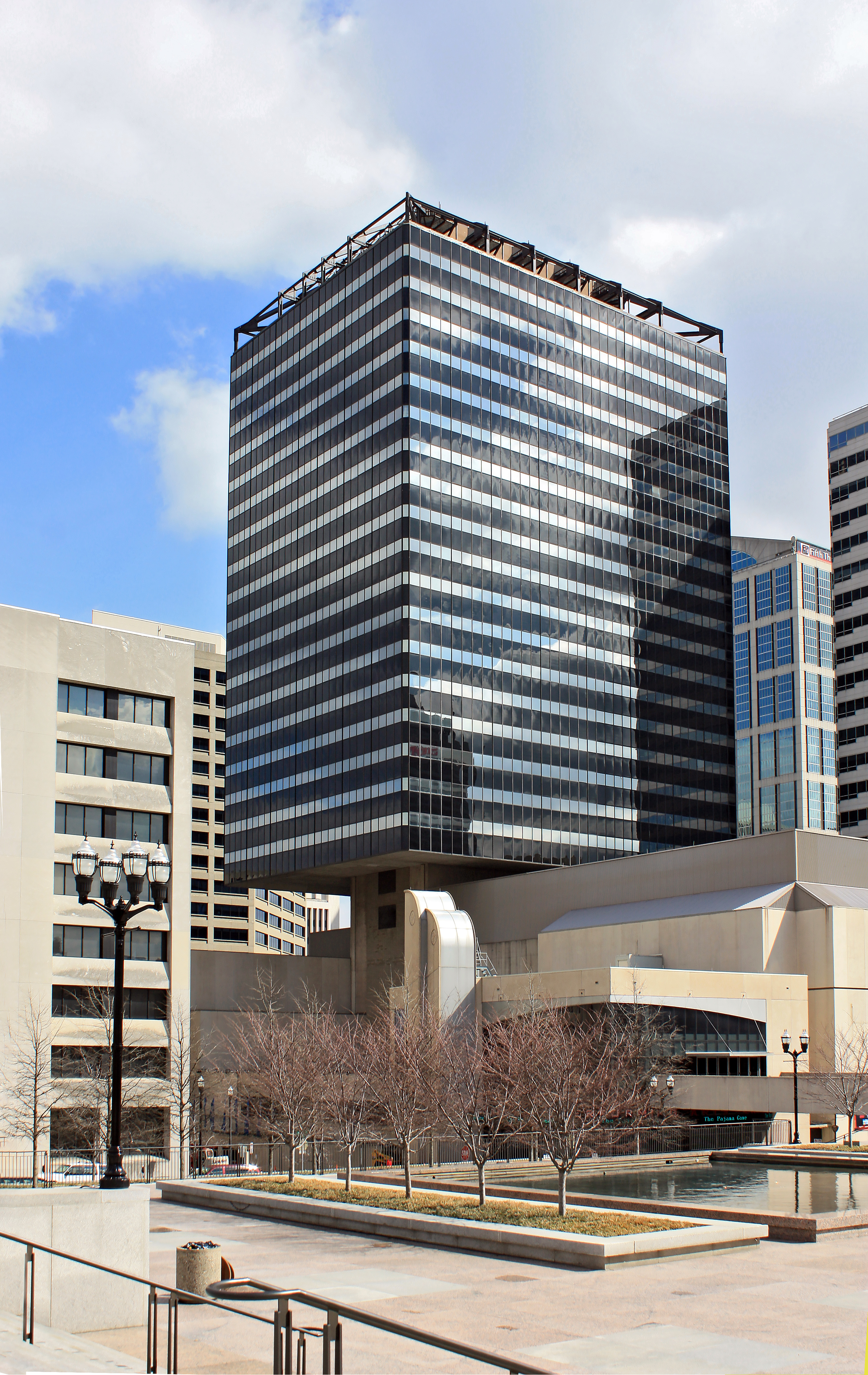
- The administrative headquarters of TDOT is located inside the James K. Polk State Office Building in Nashville

Department of transportation overview
- Formed: 1915
- Superseding Department of transportation: Tennessee Department of Highways (1915-1972)
- Jurisdiction: State of Tennessee
- Headquarters: * James K. Polk State Office Building, Nashville (Main); Knoxville (Region 1); Chattanooga (Region 2); Nashville (Region 3); Jackson (Region 4); 36.1649°N 86.7817°W
- Motto: "To provide a safe and reliable transportation system that supports economic growth and quality of life."
- Employees: 3,400
- Annual budget: $2.1 billion
- Commissioner responsible: Butch Eley, Commissioner; Steve Townsend, Chief of Staff; Paul Degges, Chief Policy Advisor; Joe Galbato, Chief Financial Officer; Preston Elliott, Chief of Environment and Planning; Will Reid, Chief Engineer
- Department of transportation executives: Steve Borden, Assistant Chief Engineer (Region 1); Joe Deering, Assistant Chief Engineer (Region 2); Jay Norris, Assistant Chief Engineer (Region 3); Jason Baker, Assistant Chief Engineer (Region 4)
- Website: tn.gov/tdot

The Tennessee Department of Transportation (TDOT) is the department of transportation for the State of Tennessee, with multimodal responsibilities in roadways, aviation, public transit, waterways, and railroads. It was established in 1915 as the Tennessee Department of Highways and Public Works, and renamed the Tennessee Department of Transportation in 1972. The core agency mission of TDOT is to provide a safe and reliable transportation system for people, goods, and services that supports economic prosperity in Tennessee. Since 1998, TDOT has been ranked amongst the top five in the nation for quality highway infrastructure. It is primarily headquartered in downtown Nashville and operates four regional offices in Chattanooga, Jackson, Knoxville, and Nashville.

== Major responsibilities ==
The major duties and responsibilities of TDOT are to:

- plan, build, and maintain the state-owned highway and Interstate system of over 14,000 miles (23,000 km);
- administer funding and provide technical assistance in the planning and construction of state and federal aid road programs for cities and counties;
- provide incident management on Tennessee's Interstate system through TDOT SmartWay, an intelligent transportation network of cameras and dynamic message signs;
- staff transportation management centers in the four largest urban cities in Tennessee;
- provide motorist information;
- construct and maintain 19 rest area facilities and 17 welcome centers;
- administer program for control of outdoor advertising adjacent to Interstate and state highways;
- issue and administer special permits for movement of overweight and over-dimensional vehicles;
- prepare and distribute city, county, and state road maps, aeronautical charts, and airport directories;
- promote safe driving behaviors on highways;
- provide management, technical and financial assistance, and supervision to public, private, and nonprofit public transportation agencies in the state
- administer funding and assistance in location, design, construction, and maintenance of the state's 80 public airports;
- support improvements in Tennessee's railroads and rail service;
- inspect over 19,000 bridges, 80 public airports, and all of the state's railroads;
- maintain state park roads;
- operate Reelfoot Airpark and ferry operations;
- respond to initiatives of the Tennessee Aeronautics Commission;
- provide aerial photography and mapping services to all state agencies;
- provide aircraft for state executive transportation and economic development recruiting;
- administer highway beautification programs;
- provide grants to all Tennessee counties for litter abatement and litter prevention education; and
- provide cycling trails that connect or go through state parks and natural areas.

== History ==
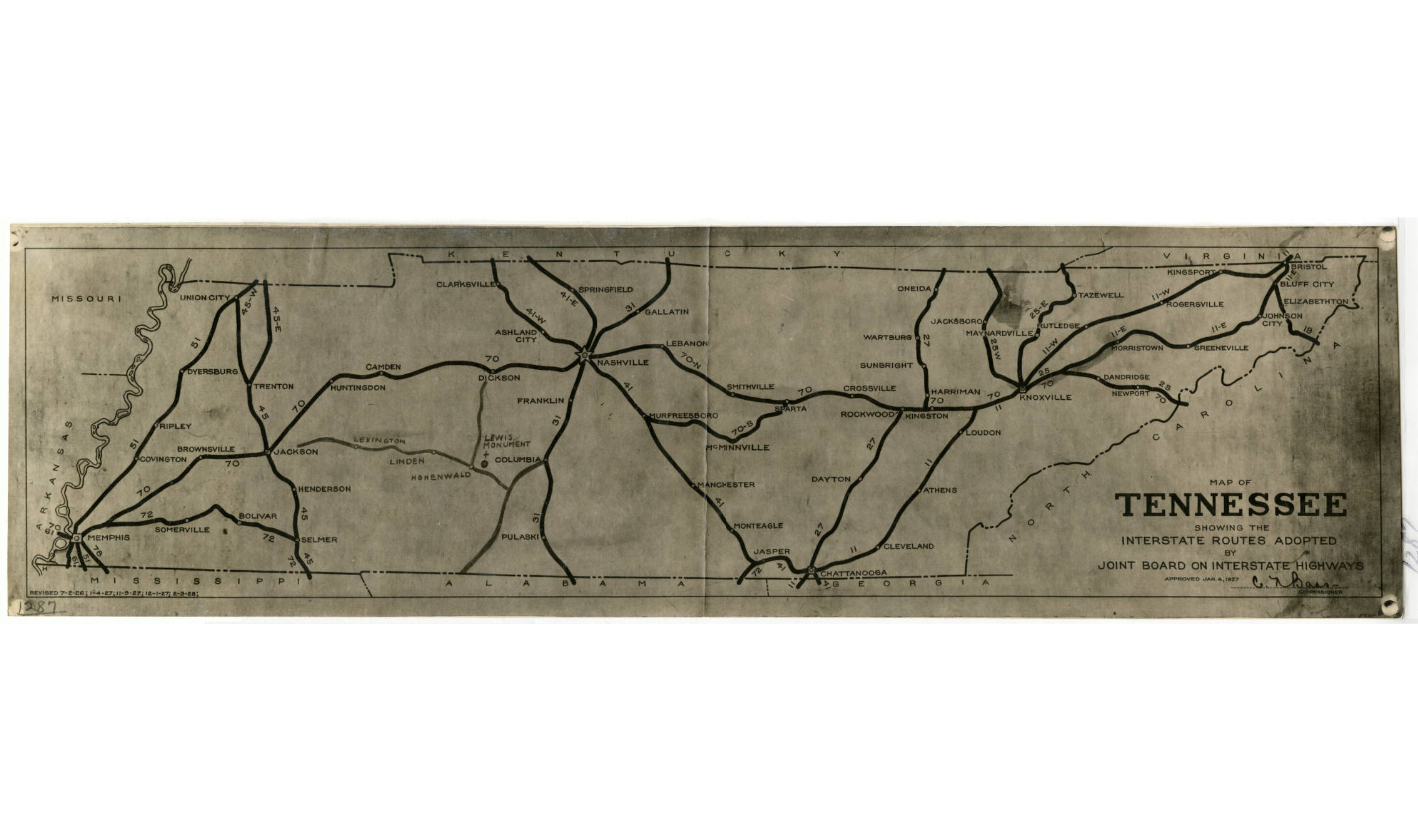
Map of early federal--"interstate" highway system in Tennessee, circa 1927

Prior to 1915, the state had no central authority governing construction and maintenance of roads. The governor, legislature, other road associations, and local governments all attempted to serve these tasks, leading to a lack of planning and management. In 1915, a State Highway Commission was created to organize transportation services. The original commission consisted of six volunteer members. As responsibilities of the commission grew, this became inadequate, and in 1919 the commission was replaced with three paid members. By 1922, roads in Tennessee were behind surrounding states. Governor Austin Peay created a new Department of Highways and Public Works and appointed J.G. Creveling, Jr. as the single commissioner. Peavy also implemented a tax of two cents per gallon to fund the new department. The collapse of the banking system in 1930 resulted in significant losses for the state and led to an inability to fund the department. All of its workers had to be released. However, in 1933 the New Deal projects gave $11 million of federal money for highway projects. Diversion of federal funds and military enlistment of personnel during World War II again crippled the department.

Following the war, the construction of the new Interstate Highway system brought a massive boom to the department. In 1972, due to its expanding role in all modes of transportation, it was renamed the Tennessee Department of Transportation. In the 1980s, TDOT began the $3.3 billion Better Roads Program to clear a backlog of projects and improve aging roads. In 1989, the gas tax was set at 21.40 cents per gallon to help fund this project. Through the 1990s and early 2000s, the department began working on ways to improve efficiency and involve communities.

== Organization ==
TDOT is headed by a single commissioner who is appointed by the governor. The leadership level also includes the Deputy Commissioner, and leaders for legal, aeronautics, community relations, and legislation. Three bureaus exist under this level. Most administrative offices operate from the TDOT headquarters in downtown Nashville, the state's capital city. There are also four regional offices across the state. Each region is further divided into districts which are then subdivided into county facilities.

The following table lists the regions, district offices, maintenance and construction offices for each region, and counties served.

TDOT regions with their constituent districts
Region	District	District office	Counties
1 (Knoxville)	17	Johnson City	Carter, Greene, Hamblen, Hancock, Hawkins, Johnson, Sullivan, Unicoi, Washington
1 (Knoxville)	18	Knoxville	Anderson, Cocke, Grainger, Jefferson, Knox, Sevier, Union
1 (Knoxville)	19	Harriman	Blount, Campbell, Claiborne, Loudon, Monroe, Morgan, Roane, Scott
2 (Chattanooga)	27	Cookeville	Clay, Cumberland, DeKalb, Fentress, Jackson, Overton, Pickett, Putnam, White
2 (Chattanooga)	28	Tullahoma	Bledsoe, Cannon, Coffee, Franklin, Grundy, Marion, Sequatchie, Van Buren, Warren
2 (Chattanooga)	29	Chattanooga	Bradley, Hamilton, McMinn, Meigs, Polk, Rhea
3 (Nashville)	37	Nashville	Davidson, Macon, Smith, Sumner, Trousdale, Wilson, Williamson
3 (Nashville)	38	McEwen	Cheatham, Dickson, Hickman, Houston, Humphreys, Maury, Montgomery, Robertson, Stewart
3 (Nashville)	39	Belfast	Bedford, Giles, Lawrence, Lewis, Lincoln, Marshall, Moore, Perry, Rutherford, Wayne
4 (Jackson)	47	McKenzie	Benton, Carroll, Decatur, Dyer, Gibson, Henry, Lake, Obion, Weakley
4 (Jackson)	48	Jackson	Chester, Crockett, Hardeman, Hardin, Haywood, Henderson, Madison, McNairy
4 (Jackson)	49	Arlington	Fayette, Lauderdale, Tipton, Shelby

=== Bureau of Administration ===
This bureau serves the administrative tasks of the department. It is further divided into the following divisions:

- Division of Central Services
- Division of Finance
- Division of Internal Audit
- Division of Human Resources
- Division of Strategic Planning
- Division of Information Technology
- Division of Procurement and Contracts

=== Bureau of Environment and Planning ===
This bureau studies environmental effects and ensures compliance with environmental policy. It also collects and analyses data to develop long range project and safety plans. It contains the following divisions:

- Environmental Division
- Long Range Planning Division
- Freight and Logistics Division

=== Bureau of Engineering ===
This bureau designs, constructs, and maintains the state's highway system. This Bureau is directed by the Chief Engineer. The majority of the bureau is split into two categories: Design and Operations, with each overseen by an Assistant Chief Engineer.

The Assistant Chief Engineer of Design oversees the following divisions:

- Roadway Design Division
- Right of Way Division
- Structures Division

The Assistant Chief Engineer of Operations is responsible for overseeing the four regional offices. They also oversee the following divisions:

- Traffic Operations Division
- Materials and Tests Division
- Construction Division
- Maintenance Division

Additionally, there are three independent divisions that report directly to the Chief Engineer:

- Bid Analysis and Estimating Office
- Program Administration and Development Division
- Strategic Transportation Investments Division

== Transportation system ==
As of 2026, TDOT reports the following as Tennessee's transportation system:

=== Highway system ===
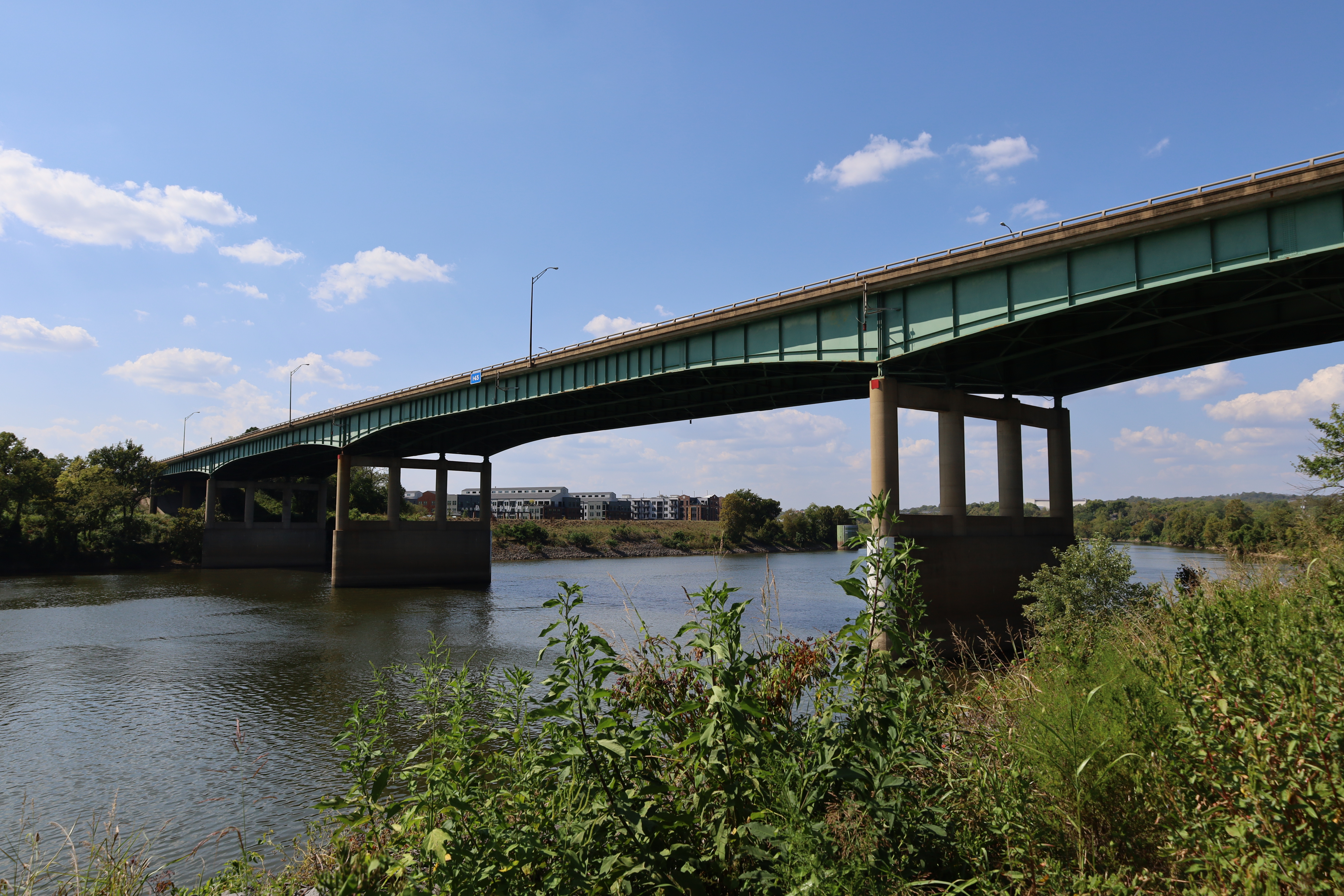
Lyle H. Fulton Bridge (Interstate 65) over the Cumberland River

- Bridges: 20,253, including 8,500 state-owned bridges and 11,753 locally-owned bridges
- Interstates: 1,201 miles (1,933 km)(Centerline miles)
- 19 Interstate rest areas
- 16 Interstate and U.S. Route welcome centers
- 9 truck weigh stations
- State highways, 14,463 miles (23,276 km)(Centerline miles)
- Total highways, 96,187 miles (154,798 km)(Lane miles)

=== Airport system ===
- 70 general aviation
- 6 commercial

=== Rail system ===
- 19 shortline railroads on 817 miles (1,315 km) of rail
- 6 major rail lines on 2,138 miles (3,441 km) of rail

=== Transit system ===
- 28 transit systems serving all 95 counties

=== Waterways ===
- 976 miles (1,571 km) of main channel navigable waterways
- 2 ferries

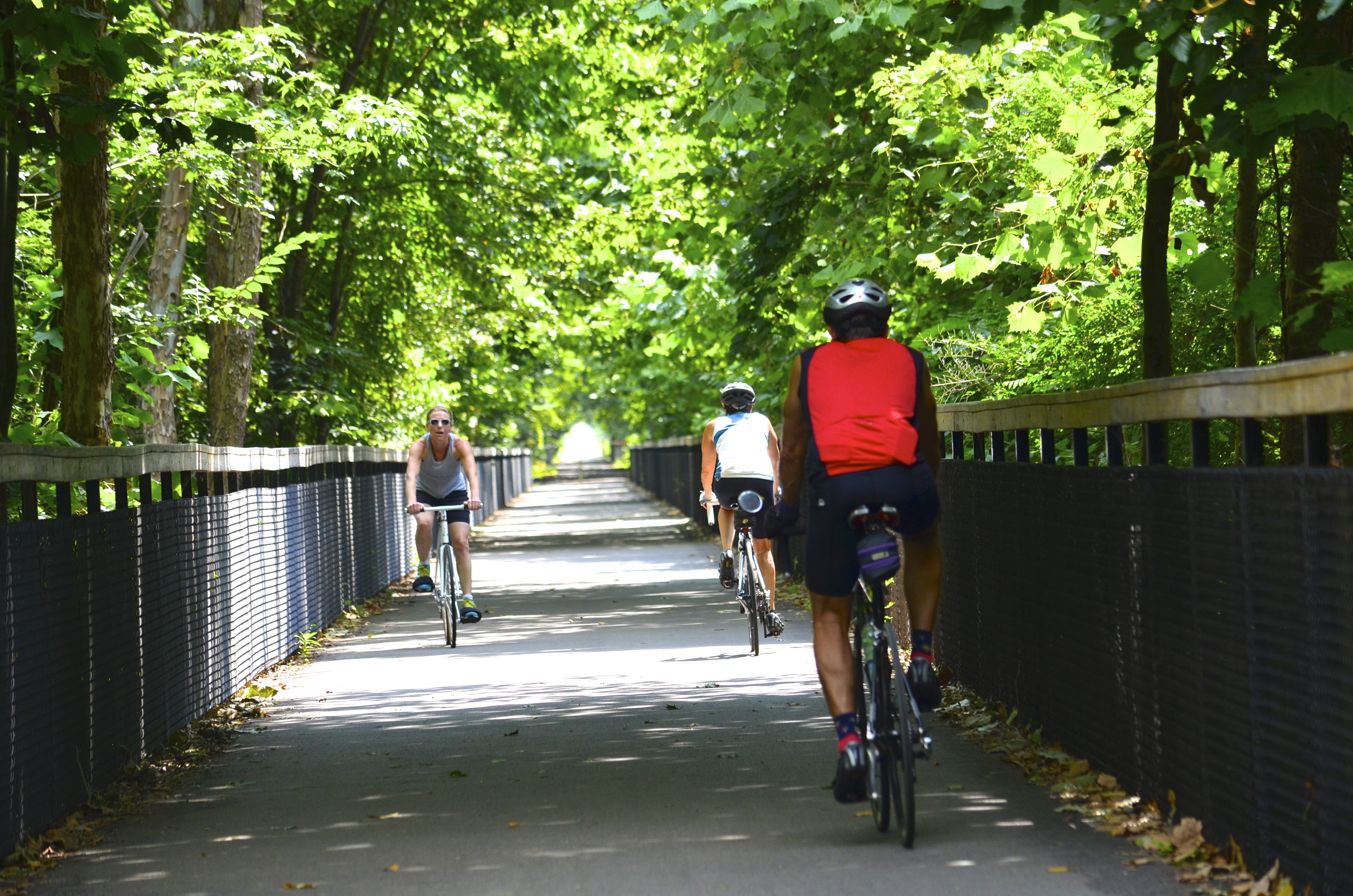
Cyclists on Shelby Farms Greenline

=== Bicycle and pedestrian system ===
- 4,557 miles (7,334 km) highway miles with 4 ft (1.2 m) or greater shoulders to accommodate bicycles
- 216 miles (348 km) of state routes with designated bike lanes
- 487 miles (784 km) of greenways, sidewalks, and trails
- 172 miles (277 km) miles of designated U.S. Bicycle Routes
- 934 miles (1,503 km) of sidewalks on state routes

== Funding ==
Funding for the state transportation system in Tennessee comes from a fund that is separate from the state's general fund which operates most of the other state agencies in Tennessee. Transportation revenues come from both federal transportation monies and from state funding resources. Those state funds come from a combination of dollars collected from gas and diesel tax revenues, titling and registration fees. Tennessee operates on a "pay as you go" system by using available revenues resulting in no debt service. Tennessee is one of three states in the nation that does not finance transportation through bonding. Critics of this mechanism claim that it inhibits the ability of the department to sufficiently complete necessary infrastructure improvements.

== Leadership history ==
The leaders of the department and its preceding organizations have been:

Tennessee Department of Transportation Commissioners
- Thomas Clarke Rye, A.H. Purdue, Charles, E. Ferris, Authur Crownover, Charles W. Williams, William H. Crox, 1915–1919
- W.P. Moore, W.W. House, W.T. Testerman, 1919–1923
- J.G. Creveling, Jr., 1923–1925
- C.N. Bass, 1925–1928
- Harry S. Berry, 1928–1929
- R. H. Baker, 1929–1933
- F.W. Webster, 1933–1934
- H.S. Walters, 1934–1935
- Briggs Smith, 1935–1937
- M.O. Allen, 1937–1939
- C.W. Phillips, 1939–1949
- E.W. Eggleston, 1949–1950
- Charles Wayland, 1950–1951
- C.W. Bond, 1951–1952
- Herbert A. McKee, 1952–1953
- W.M Leech, 1953–1958
- Herbert M. Bates, 1958–1959
- D.W. Moulton, 1959–1963
- David M. Pack, 1963–1967
- E.W. Speight, 1967–1971
- Robert F. Smith, 1971–1975
- Eddie L. Shaw, 1975–1979
- William B. Sansom, 1979–1981
- Robert E. Farris, 1981–1985
- Dale R. Kelley, 1985–1987
- Jimmy M. Evans, 1987–1992
- Carl Johnson, 1992–1994
- Carl Wood, 1994–1995
- Bruce Saltsman, 1995–2003
- Gerald F. Nicely, 2003–2011
- John Schroer, 2011–2019
- Clay Bright, 2019–2021
- Joe Galbato [interim], 2021–2022
- Butch Eley, 2022–2025
- Will Reid, P.E., 2025-present
