= War Memorial Park =

War Memorial Park may refer to:

- War Memorial Park (West Bridgewater, Massachusetts)
- War Memorial Park, Coventry, England
- War Memorial Park, Singapore
- Kangaroo Ground War Memorial Park, Kangaroo Ground, Victoria, Australia
- Irish National War Memorial Gardens

== See also ==
- War Memorial (disambiguation)
