= Dial–Roberson Stadium =

Stadium in Ada, Ohio

- Interactive map of Dial–Roberson Stadium
- Address: 3768 Klinger Road; Ada, Ohio; United States
- Coordinates: 40.7641°N 83.8387°W
- Owner: Ohio Northern University
- Capacity: 3,500

Construction
- Years active: 2004-Present

Tenants
- Ohio Northern Polar Bears 2004-Present

Dial-Roberson All-Events Stadium is a stadium on the campus of Ohio Northern University in Ada, Ohio, United States. The stadium is the home of the Ohio Northern Polar Bears football team, and also houses facilities for other ONU athletic teams. The stadium has an official seating capacity of 3,500, but can accommodate more than 1,000 additional spectators on the lawn surrounding the field.

The first game at Dial–Roberson Stadium was held on September 4, 2004. The Polar Bears defeated Westminster College, 31–0. The stadium is named for Jim and Nidrah Dial, and for former ONU head football coach Arden Roberson. Roberson was represented by family friend and Ohio State Buckeyes football coach Jim Tressel at the dedication of the facility, held September 25, 2004.

Prior to the opening of the stadium, the Polar Bears played at Ada War Memorial Stadium.
