= Veterans Memorial Park (Leesburg, Florida) =

Park in Leesburg, Florida

Coordinates: 28.8135°N 81.8779°W

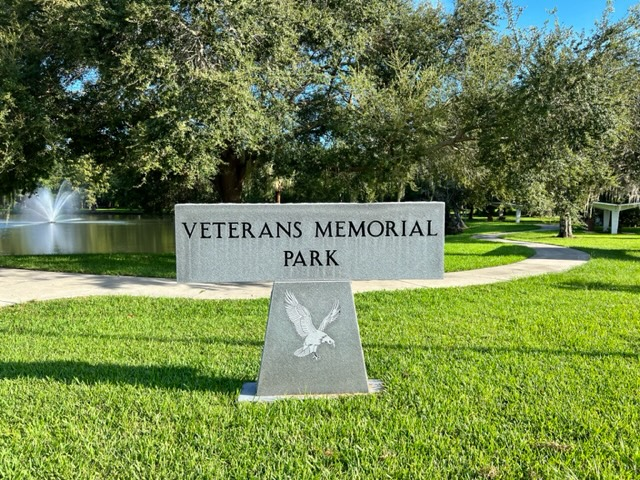
Marker located in front of Veterans Memorial Park in Leesburg, Florida.

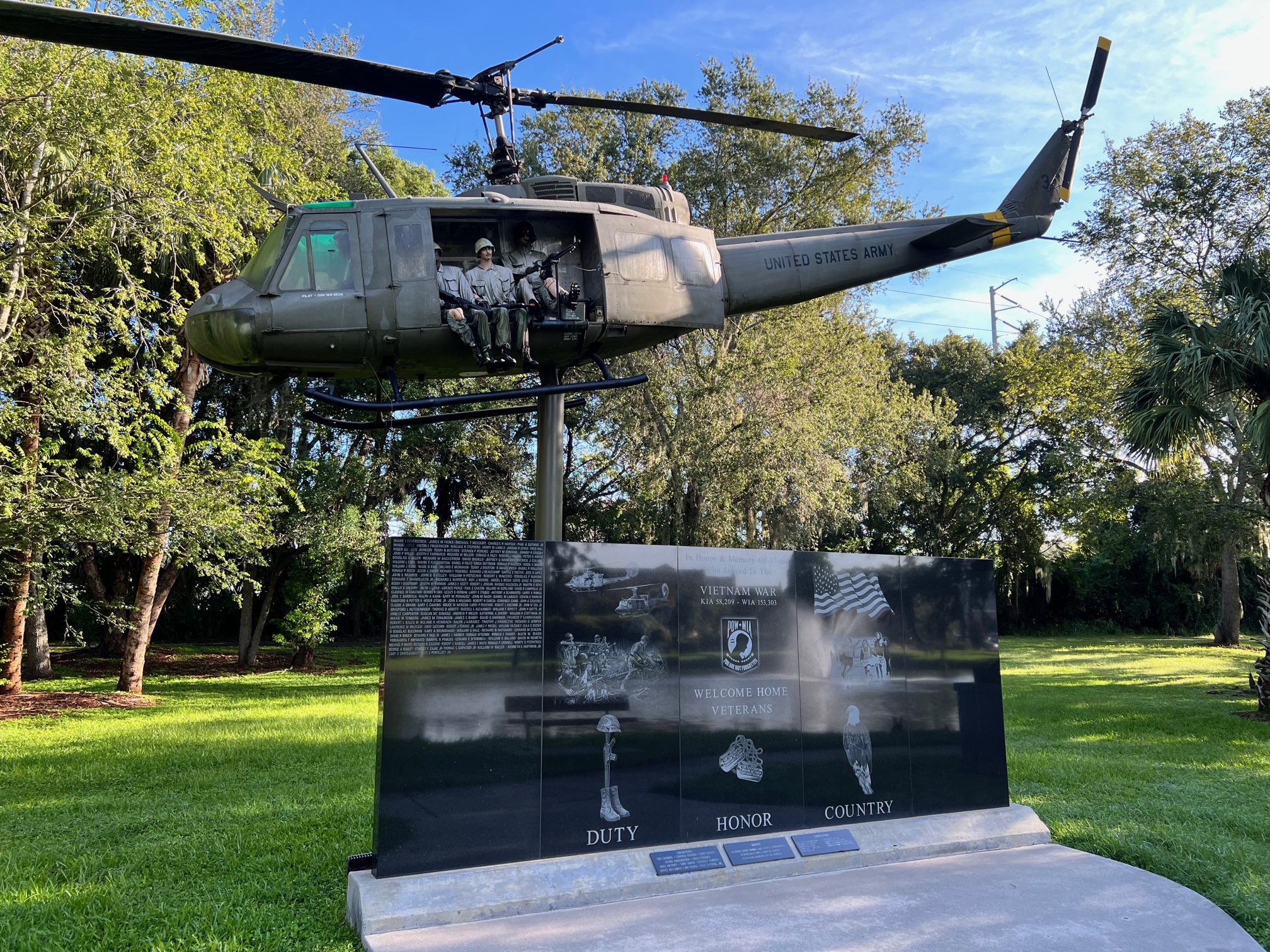
The Vietnam War Memorial located in Veterans Memorial Park in Leesburg, Florida.

Veterans Memorial Park is located at 600 W. Meadow Street in Leesburg, Florida, just north of City Hall. The park includes a small playground for young children, lighted walking path, covered seating, and several memorials celebrating the U.S. military and area veterans. It also contains a pond called Fountain Lake.

== History ==
The park, originally referred to as City Hall Park, was built shortly after City Hall opened in 1926. Leesburg City Commissioner A. H. Bourlay sold the property to the city in September 1926 for $1.00.

Initial plans for the park included a terraced stadium, band shell, and lagoon. The Leesburg City Commission considered bids for the band shell during a meeting in February 1927, but all bids received by the city manager were higher than had been approved. Thus, the commission unanimously passed a motion to reject all the bids, and no band shell was ever built. A small lake was later constructed, and an illuminated fountain was installed within it in 1928.

From the 1930s until the early 1980s, the Leesburg Chamber of Commerce had its own building in a corner of the park, which was renamed Fountain Lake Park.

The park was also home to several swans. In 1984, Daily Commercial columnist Norma Hendricks warned readers to beware of swan attacks during nesting time, after the parks and recreation department had similar signs installed around the lake.

In 2008, Donald Van Beck, a U.S. Army Veteran, organized an effort to transform the city park into a gathering place to memorialize local veterans. Van Beck helped raise $525,000 for the Veterans Memorial project, which was completed and dedicated in 2012.

The Leesburg City Commission voted to rename the park to Veterans Memorial Park during a meeting on March 23, 2015

Led by Van Beck, area veterans continued to fund and construct additional memorials in the park, including the Korean War Memorial, Vietnam War Veterans Memorial and the World War II Memorial. The Vietnam War Memorial, dedicated on November 11, 2016, includes a Vietnam-era Huey helicopter complete with mannequins in uniform.

The city of Leesburg dedicated the Don Van Beck Memorial Walkway in the center of the park in 2019 to honor the late veteran.
