= Veterans Park =

Veterans Park may refer to:

- Veterans Park (Mount Vernon, Illinois), a former sports facility in Mount Vernon, Illinois
- Veterans Park (Holyoke, Massachusetts), a city park in Holyoke, Massachusetts
- Veterans Park (Charlotte, North Carolina), a city park Charlotte, North Carolina
- Veterans Park (Hamilton Township, Mercer County, New Jersey), a municipal park in Hamilton, New Jersey
- Veterans Park Amphitheatre, an amphitheater in Albany, Georgia

== See also ==
- Veterans Field (disambiguation)
- Veterans Memorial Park (disambiguation)
- Veterans Stadium, a former multi-purpose stadium located in Philadelphia, Pennsylvania, U.S.
