= Memorial Coliseum =

Memorial Coliseum (or Veterans Memorial Coliseum in some cases) may refer to:

- Alexander Memorial Coliseum, Atlanta
- Allen County War Memorial Coliseum, Fort Wayne, Indiana
- Arizona Veterans Memorial Coliseum, Phoenix, Arizona
- PeoplesBank Arena Veterans Memorial Coliseum, Hartford, Connecticut
- Jacksonville Veterans Memorial Coliseum, Jacksonville, Florida
- Los Angeles Memorial Coliseum, Los Angeles, California
- Lawrence Joel Veterans Memorial Coliseum, Winston-Salem, North Carolina
- Memorial Coliseum (Corpus Christi), Corpus Christi, Texas
- Memorial Coliseum (University of Kentucky), Lexington, Kentucky
- Nassau Veterans Memorial Coliseum, Uniondale, New York
- New Haven Veterans Memorial Coliseum, New Haven, Connecticut
- Winston-Salem Memorial Coliseum, Winston-Salem, North Carolina
- Veterans Memorial Coliseum (Marion, Ohio)
- Veterans Memorial Coliseum (Portland, Oregon)
- Veterans Memorial Coliseum (Madison, Wisconsin)

Memorial Coliseum is the former name of:

- Beard–Eaves–Memorial Coliseum, Auburn, Alabama
- Coleman Coliseum, Tuscaloosa, Alabama

== See also ==
- Memorial Field (disambiguation)
- Memorial Gymnasium (disambiguation)
- Memorial Stadium (disambiguation)
