= Memorial Stadium =

Memorial Stadium may refer to:

== United States ==
- Memorial Stadium (Bakersfield), Bakersfield, California
- California Memorial Stadium, University of California, Berkeley, California
- Memorial Stadium (Storrs), University of Connecticut, Storrs, Connecticut
- Historic Sanford Memorial Stadium, Sanford, Florida
- A. J. McClung Memorial Stadium, Columbus, Georgia
- Memorial Stadium (Savannah), Savannah, Georgia
- Memorial Stadium (Waycross), Georgia
- Memorial Stadium (Boise), Boise, Idaho
- Gies Memorial Stadium, University of Illinois, Champaign, Illinois
- Memorial Stadium (Indiana University old), Indiana University (1925–1959), now known as Tenth Street Stadium
- Memorial Stadium (Indiana University), Bloomington, Indiana
- Memorial Stadium (Fort Wayne), Fort Wayne, Indiana
- Memorial Stadium (Terre Haute), Indiana State University, Terre Haute, Indiana
- David Booth Kansas Memorial Stadium, Lawrence, Kansas
- Memorial Stadium (Kansas State), Manhattan, Kansas
- Memorial Stadium (Maine), Portland, Maine
- Baltimore Memorial Stadium, Baltimore, Maryland
- Memorial Stadium (University of Minnesota), Minneapolis, Minnesota (1924–1981)
- Mississippi Veterans Memorial Stadium, Jackson, Mississippi
- Faurot Field at Memorial Stadium, Columbia, Missouri
- Memorial Stadium (Lincoln), University of Nebraska, Nebraska
- Memorial Stadium (Wayne State), Wayne State College, Wayne, Nebraska
- Memorial Stadium (Dartmouth), Dartmouth College, Hanover, New Hampshire
- Memorial Stadium (Asheville), North Carolina
- American Legion Memorial Stadium, Charlotte, North Carolina
- Memorial Stadium (University of North Dakota), Grand Forks, North Dakota
- Memorial Stadium (Kent State), Kent State University, Kent, Ohio
  - Dix Stadium, Kent State University, known as Memorial Stadium from 1969 to 1971, Kent, Ohio
- Gaylord Family Oklahoma Memorial Stadium, University of Oklahoma, Norman, Oklahoma
- Christy Mathewson–Memorial Stadium, Bucknell University, Lewisburg, Pennsylvania
- Memorial Stadium (Clemson), Clemson University, Clemson, South Carolina
- Simmons Bank Liberty Stadium, Memphis, Tennessee, formerly known as Memphis Memorial Stadium and Liberty Bowl Memorial Stadium
- Memorial Stadium (Johnson City, Tennessee), formerly listed on the National Register of Historic Places (NRHP) in Washington County, Tennessee
- Memorial Stadium (Alice, Texas), Alice, Texas
- Memorial Stadium (Arlington, Texas), University of Texas at Arlington
- Darrell K Royal–Texas Memorial Stadium, University of Texas at Austin
- Memorial Stadium (Texas A&M–Commerce), Commerce, Texas
- Memorial Stadium (Mesquite, Texas), Mesquite, Texas
- Pasadena Memorial Stadium, also known as Veterans Memorial Stadium, Pasadena, Texas
- Memorial Stadium (Tarleton State), Stephenville, Texas
- Memorial Stadium (Wichita Falls), Wichita Falls, Texas
- Memorial Stadium (Seattle), Seattle, Washington
- Memorial Stadium (Spokane), original name of Joe Albi Stadium in Spokane, Washington

== Elsewhere ==
- Memorial Stadium (St. John's), St. John's, Newfoundland and Labrador, former home of the St. John's Maple Leafs
- Memorial Stadium (Bristol), Bristol Rovers F.C., Bristol form home of Bristol Rugby Club in England

== See also ==
- Memorial Coliseum (disambiguation)
- Memorial Field (disambiguation)
- Memorial Gymnasium (disambiguation)
- Veterans Memorial Stadium (disambiguation)
- War Memorial Stadium (disambiguation)
