= War Memorial Stadium =

War Memorial Stadium may refer to:

- Ada War Memorial Stadium, in Ada, Ohio, also known as War Memorial Stadium
- War Memorial Stadium (Arkansas), Little Rock, Arkansas
- War Memorial Stadium (Austin, Texas), original name of Darrell K Royal–Texas Memorial Stadium
- War Memorial Stadium (Buffalo, New York), former stadium, now demolished
- War Memorial Stadium (Virginia), in Hampton, Virginia
- War Memorial Stadium (Wyoming), in Laramie, Wyoming
- War Memorial Stadium (Hawaii), home of the Hula Bowl
- World War Memorial Stadium, Greensboro, North Carolina, also known as War Memorial Stadium

== See also ==
- Memorial Stadium (disambiguation)
- Veterans Memorial Stadium (disambiguation)
- War Memorial Auditorium (disambiguation)
