= War Memorial Gymnasium (disambiguation) =

War Memorial Gymnasium at the Sobrato Center is an athletic venue on the University of San Francisco campus in San Francisco, California.

War Memorial Gymnasium may also refer to:

- UBC War Memorial Gymnasium, on the University of British Columbia campus
- War Memorial Gymnasium (Virginia Tech)
- War Memorial Gymnasium (Wailuku, Hawaii)

== See also ==
- War Memorial (disambiguation)
