= Veterans Memorial Stadium =

Veterans Memorial Stadium is the name of several different facilities, mostly located in the United States:

- Veterans Memorial Stadium (Cedar Rapids), Iowa
- Veterans Memorial Stadium (Pago Pago), American Samoa
- Veterans Memorial Stadium (Long Beach), California
- Veterans Memorial Stadium (Quincy), Massachusetts
- Veterans Memorial Stadium (La Crosse), Wisconsin
- Veterans Memorial Stadium (Lawrence), Massachusetts
- Veterans Memorial Stadium (Troy University), Alabama
- Veterans Memorial Stadium (League City), Texas
- Veterans Memorial Stadium (Erie), Pennsylvania

== See also ==
- Memorial Stadium (disambiguation)
- Mississippi Veterans Memorial Stadium, Jackson, Mississippi
- Pasadena Veterans Memorial Stadium, Pasadena, Texas
- Veterans Field (disambiguation)
- Veterans Memorial Field, Altoona, Pennsylvania
- Veterans Stadium, Philadelphia, Pennsylvania
- Veterans Stadium (New Britain, Connecticut)
- VyStar Veterans Memorial Arena, Jacksonville, Florida
