= Tennessee Department of Personnel =

The Tennessee Department of Personnel is a Cabinet-level agency within the state government of the U.S. state of Tennessee, headed by Nat E. Johnson, the Acting Commissioner of Personnel. The agency administers the employment applications process for Tennessee's state departments, assists other agencies with personnel practices, and advises the governor on personnel policy, and meeting the needs of the government's 38,000 employees in Tennessee's 95 counties. The Department is housed in the James K. Polk State Office Building.

The Department has the power to temporarily transfer employees from one department to another when necessary, and it is required by statute to establish and maintain a training program for administrative judges and hearing officers. It assists state departments in planning and conduct of training workshops, to prevent sexual harassment from occurring, and designs orientation sessions which are made available to each department for each new employee. It is required to make a study of the civil service system and provide periodic reports to the governor on recommendations for improvements. The Department makes annual reports, and special reports if they deem it to be necessary, on the personnel administration for the governor and commissioner.

The Department carries out its duties through eleven divisions: the Examinations Division, the Applicant Services Division, the Technical Services Division, the Classification/Compensation Division, the Employee Relations Division, the Research Division, the Administrative Services division, the Information Services Division, the Equal Employment Opportunities/Affirmative Action division, the Americans with Disabilities division, and the Employee Development and Equal Opportunity division.
