= Memorial Gymnasium =

Memorial Gymnasium may refer to:

In the United States:

- Memorial Athletic and Convocation Center at Kent State University in Kent, Ohio, known as Memorial Gym from 1956 to 1991
- Memorial Gymnasium (Grambling State), Grambling, Louisiana
- Memorial Gymnasium (University of Idaho), Moscow, Idaho
- Memorial Gymnasium (University of Maine), Orono, Maine
- Memorial Gymnasium (McNeese State), Lake Charles, Louisiana
- Memorial Gymnasium (University of Texas at El Paso), El Paso, Texas
- Memorial Gymnasium (Vanderbilt University), Nashville, Tennessee
- Memorial Gymnasium (Virginia), at the University of Virginia, Charlottesville, Virginia
- Scotty Robertson Memorial Gymnasium, Ruston, Louisiana

== See also ==
- War Memorial Gymnasium, at the University of San Francisco
- Memorial Coliseum (disambiguation)
- Memorial Stadium (disambiguation)
