= Veterans Field =

Veterans Field may refer to:

- Veterans Field (Massachusetts), a baseball venue located in Chatham, Massachusetts, U.S.
- Veterans Field (Texas), a baseball venue located in Laredo, Texas, U.S.

== See also ==
- Veterans Memorial Field, a baseball venue in Altoona, Pennsylvania, U.S.
- Veterans Park (disambiguation)
- Veterans Stadium, a former multi-purpose stadium located in Philadelphia, Pennsylvania, U.S.
