= Memorial Auditorium (Moorhead, Minnesota) =

Indoor arena in Moorhead, Minnesota

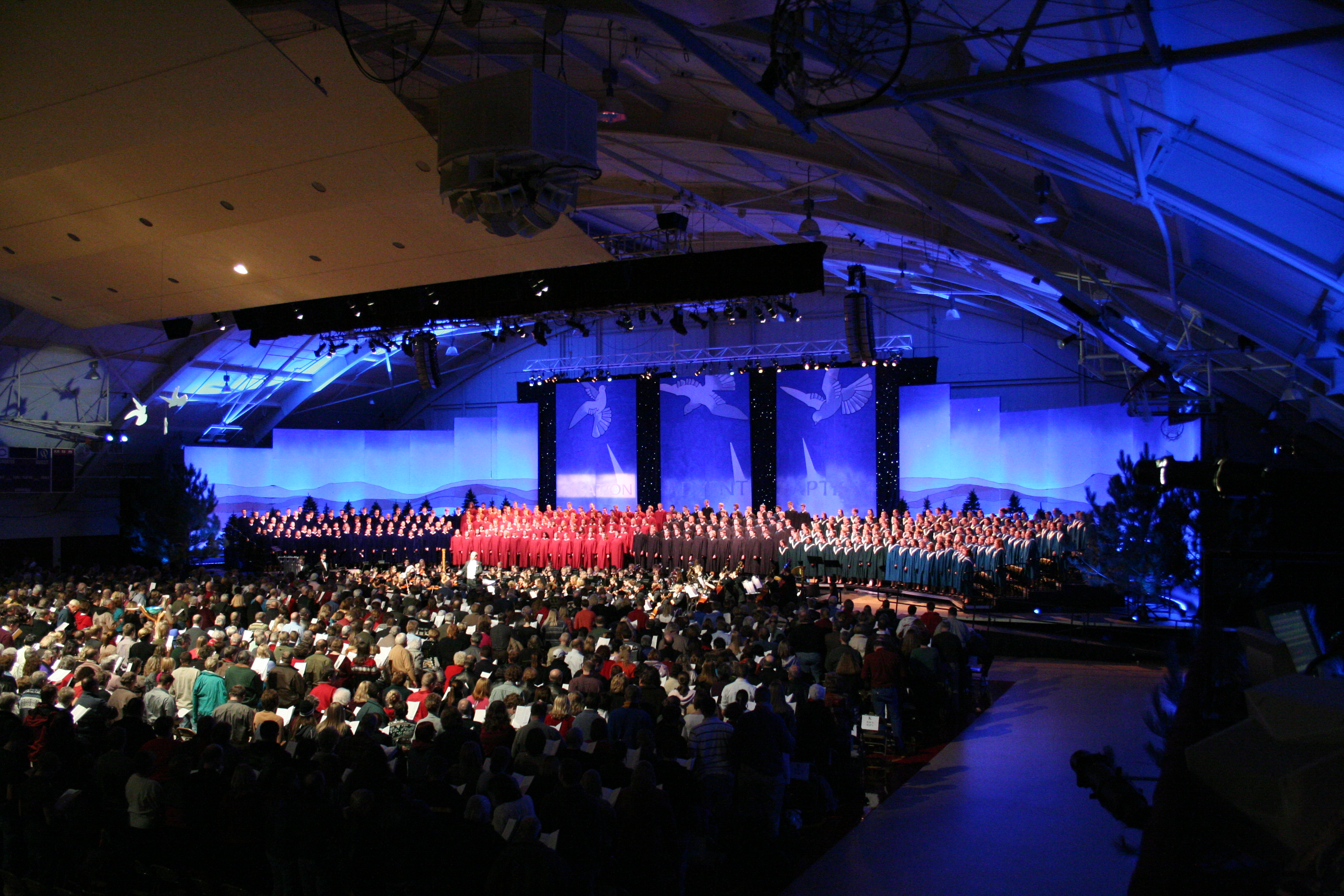
- 2005 Concordia Christmas Concert in Memorial Auditorium

- Location within Minnesota
- Address: 901 8th Street S
- Location: Moorhead, Minnesota, U.S.
- Coordinates: +46.86244°N 96.77064°W
- Owner: Concordia College

Construction
- Opened: December 2, 1952

Memorial Auditorium is a 6,000-seat indoor arena located in Moorhead, Minnesota. It was built in 1952 and dedicated to Moorhead-area residents who fought and served the United States during World War II and the Korean War, and until the Fargodome was built forty years later, was the largest indoor venue in the Fargo-Moorhead area. It remains the largest arena in the area to be used primarily for basketball, and has been the home of the Concordia College Cobbers basketball, volleyball and wrestling teams for decades.

The arena contains only 1800 permanent seats, with the remaining seats in bleachers. For concerts, floor seating can be brought in, bringing the total capacity to up to 7,000. The arena features a wood parquet hardwood floor, while the adjacent practice facility features a synthetic floor. The original locker rooms, located in the lower level of the arena, were rebuilt in anticipation of the venue's 60th anniversary in 2012. Memorial Auditorium is also home to the offices of Concordia's athletic department.

Memorial Auditorium's first sporting event, played on December 2, 1952, was a 69-59 Cobbers victory over North Dakota State University, attended by 5,500 fans. It has hosted concerts by many recording artists over the decades.

Memorial Auditorium's roof suffered uneven snowloads, resulting in a basketball hoop being lowered by an inch early in 2013. Due to these structural concerns, several events normally held at the Auditorium were moved to other venues, including the Fargodome, Bison Sports Arena and Scheels Arena, all of which are located in Fargo, North Dakota.

== Competition ==
In addition to the FargoDome and Bison Sports and Scheels Arenas, Memorial Auditorium's competition includes, in the surrounding area, the Alerus Center and Ralph Engelstad Arena in Grand Forks, North Dakota and, to a lesser extent, Target Center in Minneapolis and MTS Centre in Winnipeg.
