= Norma Hendricks =

First female mayor in Leesburg, FL

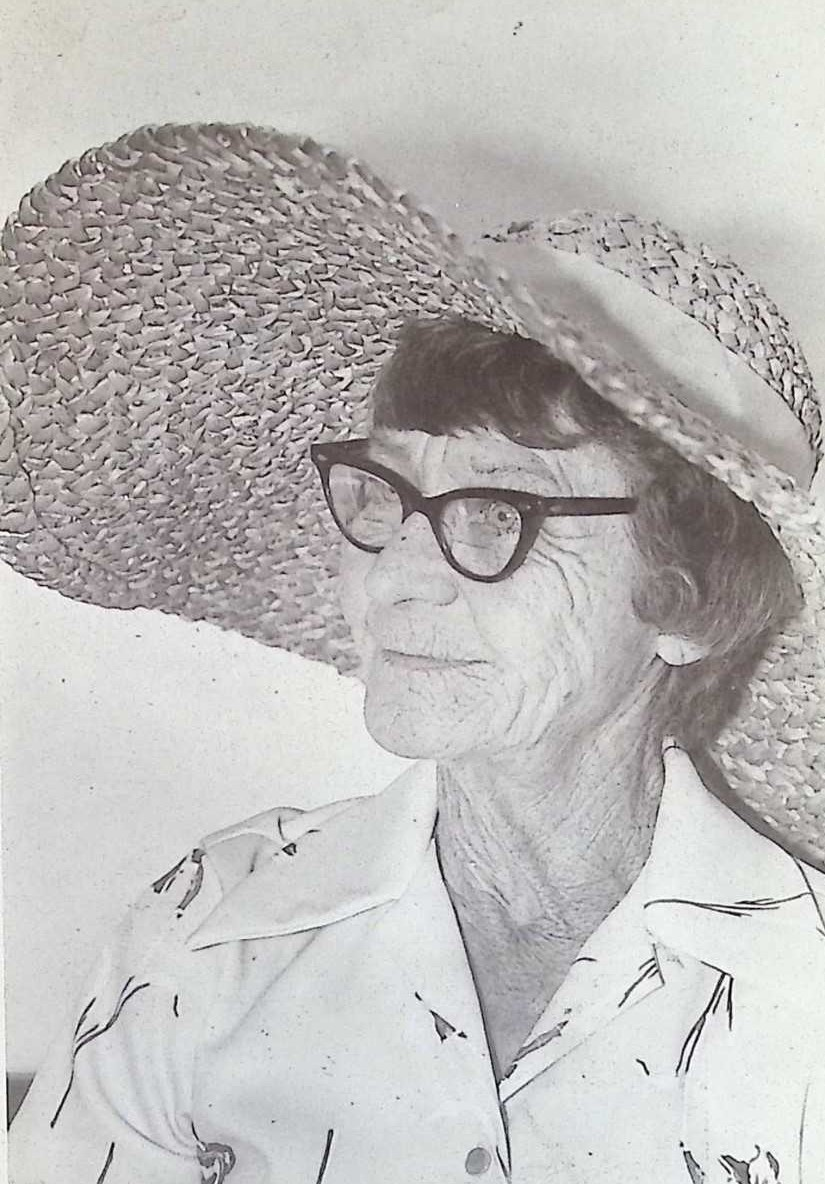
- Norma Hendricks, wearing one of her many hats.

Career
- Journalist: Journalist from 1951-Late 1960s
- Mayor: Mayor of Leesburg, Florida in 1965

Personal details
- Born: Norma Carroll Canaday; March 26, 1911 Florida
- Died: August 15, 1990 (aged 79) Leesburg, Florida
- Resting place: Lone Oak Cemetery, Leesburg, Florida
- Spouse: Leonard G. Hendricks
- Children: C. Gay Hendricks, Michael Hendricks
- Education: Leesburg High School
- Occupation: Politician, journalist, columnist
- Nickname: Hat Lady

Norma Carroll Hendricks (26 March 1911– 15 August 1990) was a columnist/journalist for the Lake Sentinel (an edition of the Orlando Sentinel) and the Daily Commercial as well as the first female mayor of Leesburg, Florida (the second in all of Lake County, Florida). In 2005, she was inducted into Lake County Women's Hall of Fame by the Lake County Commission.

== Journalistic career ==
Hendricks had a family history of journalism with a grandfather from Chattanooga, Tennessee who worked on a local paper there as editor and a sister who worked on the Daily Commercial's society page. Her sister was the one to help get Hendricks connected with the Daily Commercial, which eventually led her to getting on the staff full time in 1951.

In high school, Hendricks' first experience in the journalism field came from working for the school's paper, Lake Breezes. After becoming windowed in 1944, Hendricks found an interest in journalism while working as a society editor with her local newspaper, where she encountered cops on a regular basis by spending time at the police station and following them to scenes they were called to.

While on the staff of the Daily Commercial, Hendricks reported on many topics, such as police reporting and local goings-on that would later become local history.

== Political career ==
While working for the Orlando Sentinel, Hendricks frequently reported on city commission meetings, becoming familiar with how cities were run. In 1962, she decided to run for city council, becoming the first woman to be on the Leesburg City Commission. During her time on the council, the mayor at the time died unexpectedly. Norma then became the first female mayor of Leesburg, Florida, pro tem.

== Personal life ==
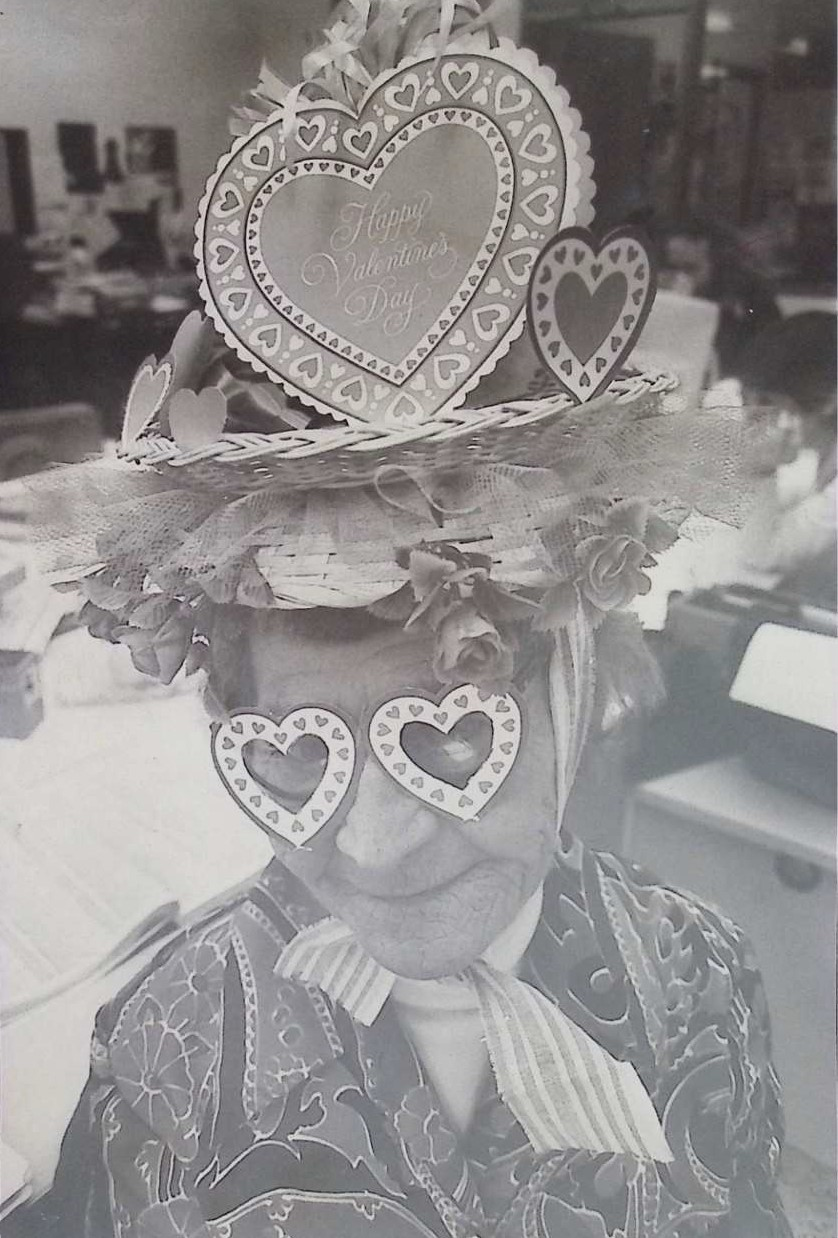
Norma celebrating Valentine's Day with one of her hats.(Courtesy of the Leesburg Heritage Society)

Hendricks was married to her husband, Leonard Gay Hendricks, in January 1936 and was widowed in 1944. While Leonard was still alive, the two of them had two sons, Calvin Michael Hendricks and Carroll Gay Hendricks. She farmed the small orange grove her husband had gifted her a few years after they had been married for a short time after Leonard's death but did not make a profit. Due to the low funds being brought in by the groves, Hendricks went into bookkeeping and secretary work.

Hendricks was known within her community, specifically among her readership, as the "Hat Lady" due to the amount of hats she would cycle through wearing. Her signature when writing her columns was a picture of her wearing a different kind of hat.

She was also involved in multiple clubs and societies, such as the Lake County Historical Society, which she was president of from 1983 to 1984, a member of the United Daughters of the Confederacy, an active member of her church, and working in local radio.

The Leesburg Board of Realtors awarded Hendricks with the Citizen of the Year title in 1983.
