= War Memorial Building (Nashville, Tennessee) =

Building in Tennessee, US

- U.S. National Register of Historic Places
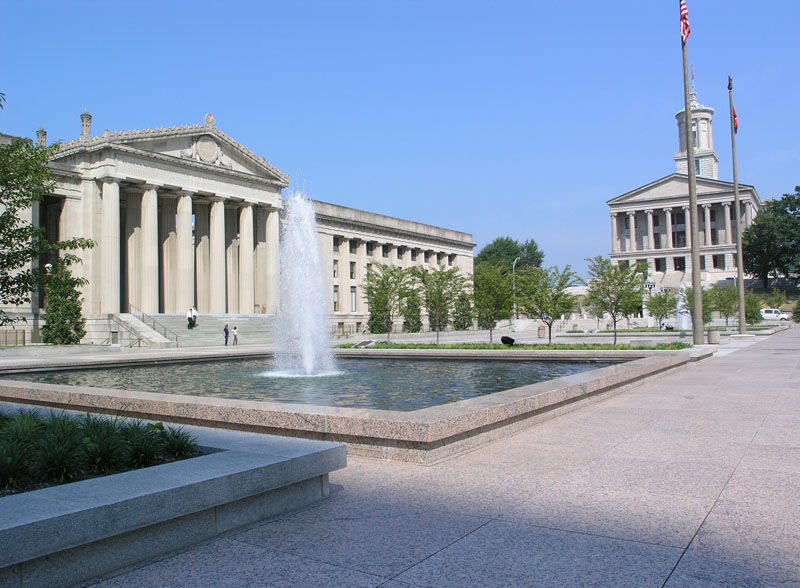
- the War Memorial Building in 2005

- Location within Tennessee Location within the United States
- Location: 301 6th Avenue North, Nashville, Tennessee
- Coordinates: 36.1644°N 86.7837°W
- Built: 1925
- Architect: Edward Emmett Dougherty
- Architectural style: Neoclassical
- NRHP reference No.: 100001822
- Added to NRHP: November 16, 2017

The War Memorial Building is a state office building in Nashville, Tennessee. It contains a 2,000-seat performance hall called the War Memorial Auditorium. Built in 1925, it served as home of the Grand Ole Opry between 1939 and 1943. It is also known as the Tennessee War Memorial or simply the War Memorial. It is located across the street from, and is governed by, the Tennessee Performing Arts Center, and is also adjacent to the Tennessee State Capitol and Legislative Plaza. It received an architectural award at the time of its construction, and was listed on the National Register of Historic Places in 2017.

== History ==
After the conclusion of World War I, the Tennessee Historical Society, the Nashville Engineering Association, and veterans groups began plans to erect a building in Nashville to memorialize the soldiers who had lost their lives in the conflict. This effort soon found an ally with the Tennessee Capitol Association, which required space for state offices and the storage of states collection of memorabilia. While there was some public support for building a classical structure adjacent to the Parthenon in Centennial Park, Governor Albert H. Roberts supported construction of a building on land between Union, Sixth, Seventh, and Cedar (now Charlotte) streets, very close to the State Capitol building designed by William Strickland. Chapter 122 of The Public Acts of 1919, also known as the Tennessee Memorial Act, enabled the state to acquire this land and build a memorial hall for offices and public assembly. The act also included provisions for memorial parks to be constructed next to the building and ensured that the names of the 3,400 Tennesseans killed in World War I would be etched on the exterior of the hall. The cost of construction, which exceeded $2.5 million, was paid for with $600,000 from the city of Nashville, $1,000,000 from Davidson county, and $1 million from the state of Tennessee.

A three-person committee of out-of-state architects was commissioned to choose an architect and designer for the project. The committee designed a competition that would narrow the field to three in-state and three out-of-state finalists, who would then compete for the final design. The ultimate winner was Nashville architect Edward Dougherty, affiliated as an associate with McKim, Mead, and White of New York. He designed a memorial in the classical architectural style consisting of an auditorium and an office block separated by a court of honor. The central courtyard is surrounded by Doric colonnade and portico recalling the entrance through the Propylaeon to the Athenian Acropolis. Above the front steps to this entrance, a carving reads:

AMERICA IS PRIVILEGED TO SPEND HER BLOOD AND HER MIGHT FOR THE PRINCIPLES THAT GAVE HER BIRTH AND HAPPINESS AND THE PEACE WHICH SHE HAS TREASURED. WOODROW WILSON

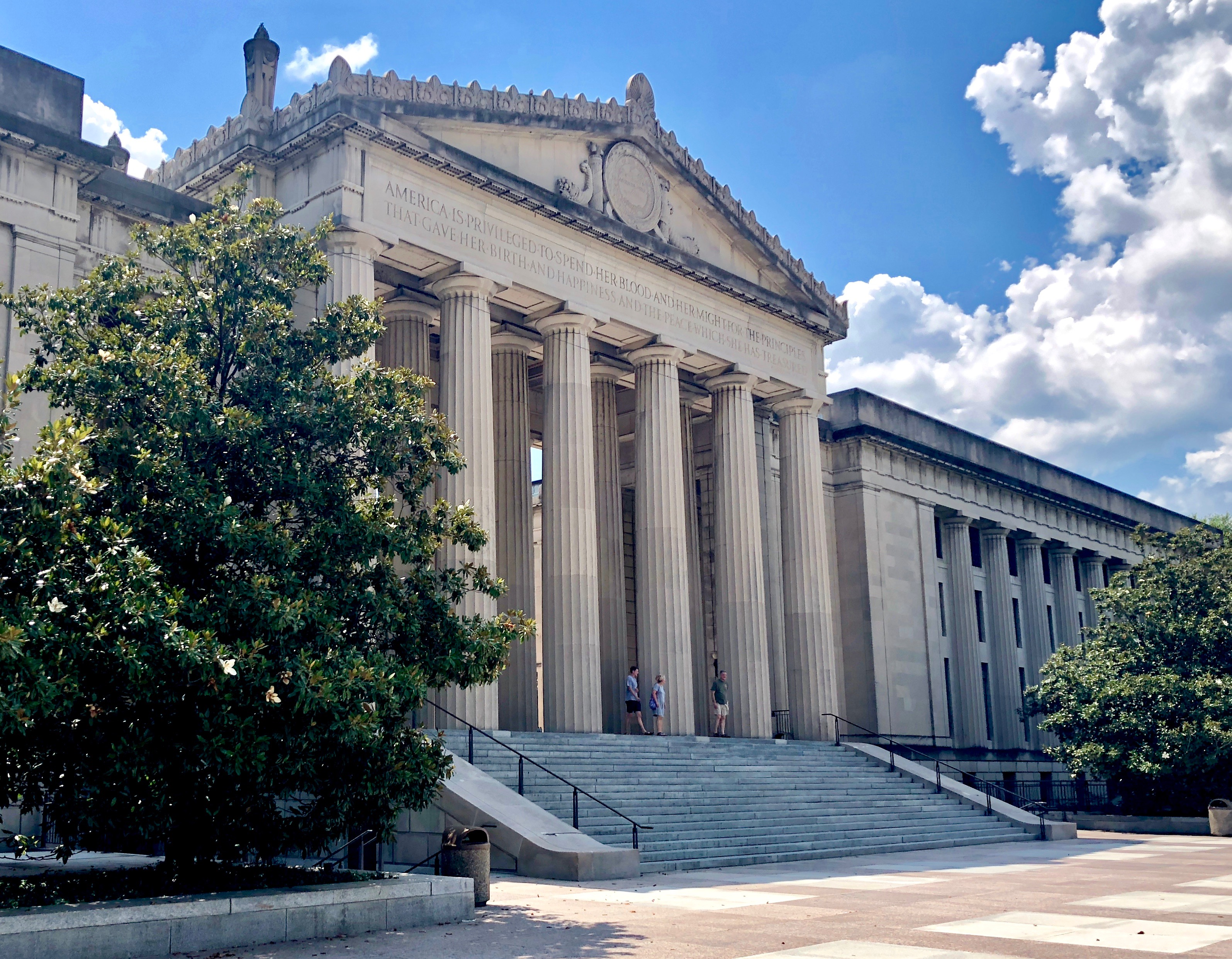
War Memorial Auditorium Nashville, July 4, 2018, showing inscription above colonnade

The above statement is a reference from 8:30 p.m. on April 2, 1917, where President Woodrow Wilson delivered his message before a joint session of Congress, recommending that a state of war be declared between the United States and the imperial German government. Realizing that the war looming ahead would be a costly one, Wilson said, "The day has come when America is privileged to spend her blood and her might for the principles that gave her birth and happiness and the peace which she has treasured." Almost a decade later, on the September 21, 1925, the War Memorial Building was dedicated. During the dedication ceremony Tennessee's World War I hero, Sgt. Alvin C. York, was escorted down the aisle as the band played Dixie.

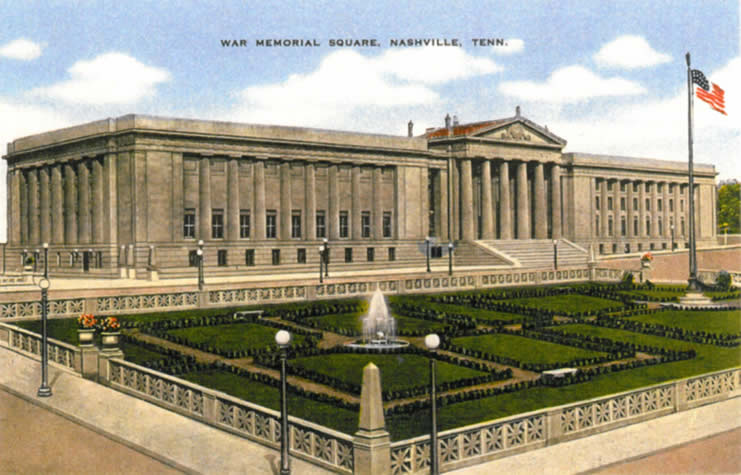
War Memorial Plaza

The auditorium originally seated 2,200, with stunning design features and near perfect acoustics. "Youth" is the name of the heroic statue which stands in the center of the courtyard holding a Nike in his open left palm, symbolizing victory in the war. Belle Kinney Scholz was the sculptor of the statue. She also built the Confederate Women's Monument at the southwest corner of the building. To the south end of the large plaza in front of the War Memorial are monuments to the Korean War (built by Russ Faxon in 1992; Faxon also built the Oh Roy statue that sits inside of the Ryman Auditorium) and the Vietnam War Monument (built by Alan LeQuire in 1986; LeQuire also built the Parthenon's Athena and the Music Circle's Musica). The military branch of the Tennessee State Museum is on the ground floor of the southern end of the building.

The building was recognized with a Gold Medal Award by the American Institute of Architecture (AIA) in 1925, the highest honor that the AIA can bestow.

From 1939 to 1943, the War Memorial Auditorium served as the fourth home of the Grand Ole Opry.

The Grand Ole Opry was performed here from about 1939 through 1943, when the Opry moved to the larger Ryman Auditorium. The Opry members who were inducted into the Grand Ole Opry family during this time at War Memorial Auditorium include Ernest Tubb, Bill Monroe, and Minnie Pearl, just to name a few. On May 3, 2010, after the current Grand Ole Opry House flooded, the Opry returned to the War Memorial Auditorium for its first public performance there in over 66 years, and continued as one of the venues that hosted the Opry until the current Opry House was restored.

Nashville's Capitol Hill and grounds that surround War Memorial Auditorium has changed greatly since the early days. The area in which the War Memorial Building resides was originally known as Memorial Square, and it consisted of the War Memorial Building, the courtyard and fountain, and the State Capitol Building. The building has hosted three United States Presidents on their campaign trails, one United States Vice President, numerous Tennessee Governor Inaugurations, and an untold array of artists across all genres. From 1971 to 1974, the original War Memorial Plaza was reconstructed into Legislative Plaza.

== Present ==
The auditorium features both open floor and seated configuration, which gives the option of sitting or standing during a performance. A wooden stage and proscenium meet an open floor with a surrounding balcony. The ceiling of the auditorium is adorned with square patterned art deco inlays. Charlie Daniels put on his first Volunteer Jam on October 4, 1974, featuring performances by members of The Allman Brothers Band and Artimus Pyle. In recent years the venue was featured in Carrie Underwood's 2006 single "Don't Forget to Remember Me" and Jewel's 2010 single, "Satisfied." It has hosted such acts as Ryan Adams and the Cardinals, Mumford & Sons, Jason Mraz, The Dead Weather and more. Live from the Artists Den filmed their 2010 Robert Plant and the Band of Joy DVD performance during a two night stay at the auditorium.

The building was listed on the National Register of Historic Places in 2017 as Tennessee War Memorial.

== See also ==
- Blue Cross Arena, formerly known as "Rochester War Memorial Auditorium"
- War Memorial Stadium
- Memorial Auditorium
- National Register of Historic Places listings in Davidson County, Tennessee
