= Ada War Memorial Stadium =

Football stadium in Ada, Ohio, U.S.

- Interactive map of Ada War Memorial Stadium
- Former names: Alumni Field (1904-1942)
- Address: 401 N Park Drive; Ada, Ohio; United States
- Coordinates: 40°45′50.9364″N 83°49′7.377″W
- Owner: Ada War Memorial Park
- Capacity: 2,283
- Scoreboard: Yes

Construction
- Groundbreaking: 1904
- Opened: 1923

Tenant
- Ada High School Football 1922-Present Ohio Northern Polar Bears Football (OAC) 1947-2004 Ada High School Soccer 2022-Present

Ada War Memorial Stadium is a football stadium located in Ada, Ohio. Also known simply as War Memorial Stadium, it is the current home of the Ada High School football, track and field, and soccer teams.

== History ==
The stadium first broke ground in 1904, after the land was purchased by Ohio Northern University President Belt. Formerly the site of the Tri-County Fair, the area was developed into Alumni Field. In 1923, ground broke to build the football field, track, and the neighboring tennis courts.

Following World War II, the stadium was renamed to Ada War Memorial Stadium, as a nod to village residents who had served in the war.

The stadium is formerly home to the Lima Warriors semi-professional football team from 2003 to 2006, and the Ohio Northern University Polar Bears football team for 57 years before the opening of Dial-Roberson Stadium in 2004. In 2010, the stadium got a new Fair-Play scoreboard with a videoboard. In 2021, the stadium was further renovated, as an artificial turf field was added to the site.

On October 25, 2019, a Guinness World Record was achieved at the stadium. 950 members of the local community came together to set the record for "Most people throwing an American football simultaneously".
