= War Memorial Building =

War Memorial Building or War Memorial Auditorium may refer to:

- San Francisco War Memorial and Performing Arts Center, San Francisco, California
- War Memorial Auditorium (Fort Lauderdale, Florida)
- War Memorial Building (Baltimore, Maryland), on the War Memorial Plaza
- War Memorial Building (Jackson, Mississippi), included on List of Mexican-American War monuments and memorials
- Adirondack Bank Center at the Utica Memorial Auditorium, New York
- Blue Cross Arena, Rochester, New York, also known as War Memorial Auditorium
- Buffalo Memorial Auditorium, Buffalo, New York, occasionally given the misnomer "War Memorial Auditorium" (in confusion with Buffalo War Memorial Stadium)
- Greensboro Coliseum Complex, Greensboro, North Carolina, also known as War Memorial Auditorium
- Onondaga County War Memorial, also known as War Memorial Building or War Memorial Auditorium and now known as Upstate Medical University Arena at Onondaga County War Memorial, Syracuse, New York
- War Memorial Auditorium (Nashville, Tennessee), also known as War Memorial Building
- Community Building (Sparta, Tennessee), also known as War Memorial Building
- War Memorial Building (New Martinsville, West Virginia)
- War Memorial Building, Belfast in Northern Ireland

== See also ==
- War Memorial Stadium (disambiguation)
