= Rachel Jackson State Office Building =

Government building in Nashville, Tennessee

- Interactive map of the Rachel Jackson State Office Building area

General information
- Location: 436 Sixth Avenue, Nashville, United States
- Coordinates: 36.1652°N 86.7828°W
- Completed: 1985

Design and construction
- Architects: Taylor & Crabtree

The Rachel Jackson State Office Building, also known as the Rachel Jackson Building, is an eight-story building in Nashville, Tennessee, U.S. It was built on the site of the 1925 Cotton States Building, and completed in 1985. It was designed in the modernist style by Taylor & Crabtree.

The building was named for First Lady-designate Rachel Jackson. When it was completed in 1985, it was "the first state-owned building in the [state] capital to memorialize a woman." It is located next to the Andrew Jackson State Office Building, named for former President Andrew Jackson.

Initial tenants in 1985 included the Tennessee Arts Commission, the Tennessee Department of Economic and Community Development, the Tennessee Department of Tourist Development, the Tennessee Department of Correction, and the Tennessee Board of Parole.
