= James K. Polk State Office Building =

State government building in Nashville, Tennessee, U.S.

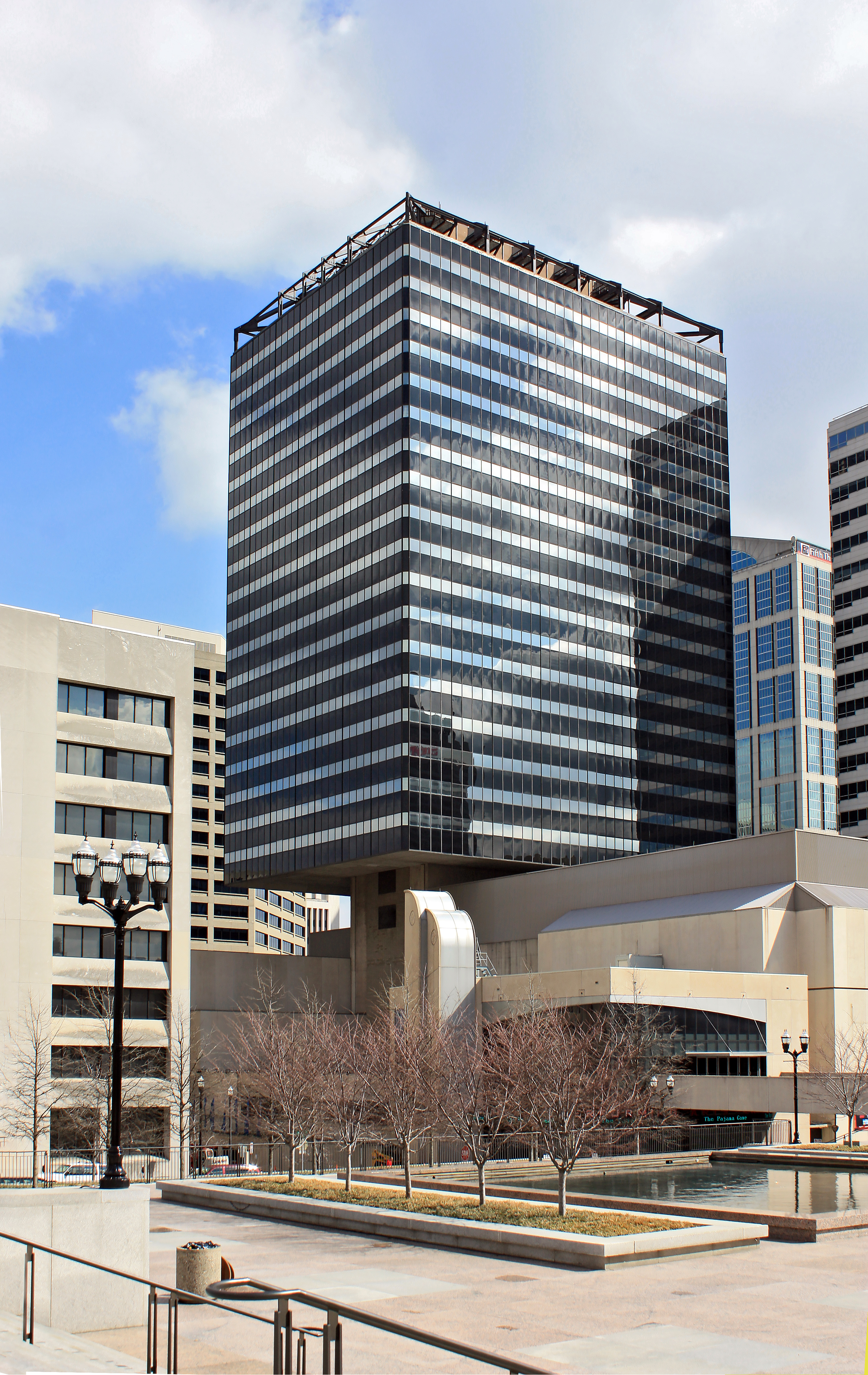
- The James K. Polk State Office Building in 2009

General information
- Type: Office
- Location: 505 Deaderick Street, Nashville, Tennessee, U.S.
- Coordinates: 36.1649°N 86.7817°W
- Completed: 1981

Height
- Roof: 392 feet (119 m)

Technical details
- Floor count: 24

Design and construction
- Architects: Taylor and Crabtree

The James K. Polk State Office Building is a 24-story, 392-foot (119 m) building in Nashville, Tennessee, United States.

The building's construction has a center core that resembles a box made from structural steel from the ground to top floor. Starting at the top, each floor is supported by hanging from the core. This design leaves the area surrounding the core on the ground levels open and free from any columns.
