= Ward–Belmont College =

Women's college in Nashville, Tennessee (1913–1951)

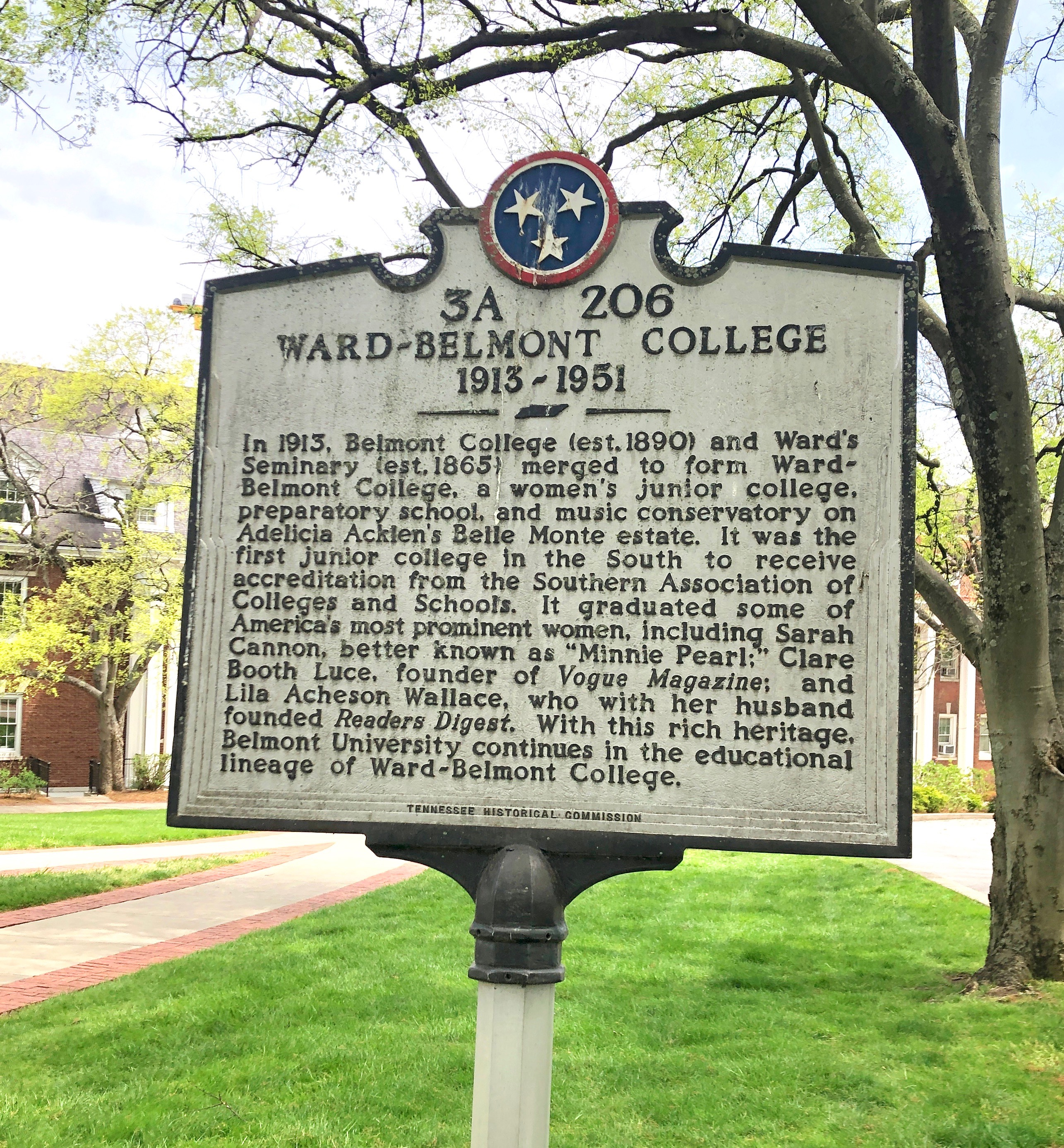
- Tennessee historical marker describing Ward-Belmont College
- Former name: Belmont College for Young Women (1890–1913)
- Type: Private university
- Active: September 4, 1890; 136 years ago (as Belmont College for Young Women) – 1951; 75 years ago (sold to the Tennessee Baptist Convention to establish Belmont College, later Belmont University)
- Founders: Susan L. Heron and Ida E. Hood
- Religious affiliation: Tennessee Baptist Convention
- Location: Nashville, Tennessee, United States; 36.1349°N 86.7948°W
- Campus: 15-acre (6.1 ha); Urban

Ward–Belmont College was a women's college located in Nashville, Tennessee. It formed from the merger of the Ward Seminary for Young Ladies and Belmont College for Young Women in 1913. The college was located on the grounds of the Belmont Mansion, the antebellum estate of Adelicia Hayes Franklin Acklen Cheatham. It was the first junior college in the South to receive full accreditation by the Southern Association of Colleges and Secondary Schools. The college was sold for financial reasons in 1951. Its grounds were used to create Belmont College (later Belmont University).

== History ==
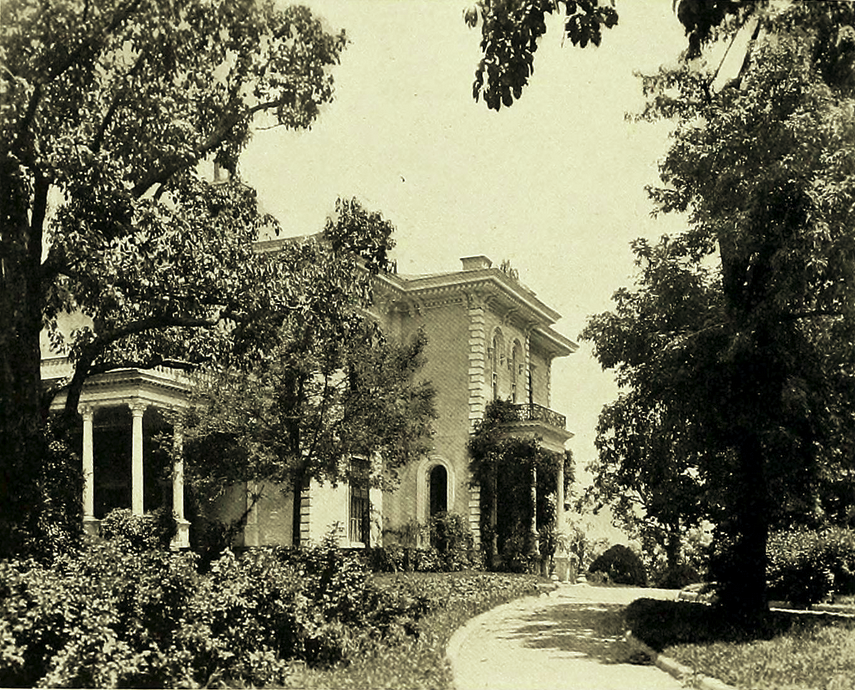
The Ward Seminary in 1911

In 1865, William E. Ward and his wife, Eliza Hudson Ward, opened the Ward Seminary for Young Ladies in Nashville, Tennessee. The Education Bureau in Washington, DC, ranked Ward Seminary among the top three educational institutions for women in the nation. The school also emphasized athletics, organizing the first girls' varsity basketball team in the South and one of the first in the nation.

Belmont College for Young Women, founded by Susan L. Heron and Ida E. Hood, opened on September 4, 1890. Modeled on the women’s colleges of the Northeast, the school was established on a 15-acre (6.1 ha) site centered on Belmont, the former home of Adelicia Hayes Franklin Acklen Cheatham, which was built in 1850.

Ward Seminary and Belmont College for Young Women merged in 1913 to form Ward-Belmont, the first junior college in the South to receive full accreditation by the Southern Association of Colleges and Secondary Schools. Dr. John Diell Blanton was the first president of Ward-Belmont; he was previously the president of Ward Seminary since 1883. In 1914, an academic building was dedicated to Dr. Blanton; however, it burned down in 1972. By the 1920s, it had an enrollment of more than 1,200 women. The Preparatory School was a four-year secondary high school program.

Entrance to the College and its Conservatory of Music was for students who had completed high school. The College and Conservatory of Music were two-year junior college programs that prepared students for senior universities. To accommodate the large number of students, three new dormitory buildings were built: Pembroke (1913), Heron (1916), and Hail (1923). These dormitories are still in use at Belmont University.

In 1951, under financial constraints, Ward-Belmont's campus was sold to the Tennessee Baptist Convention. The campus was used to establish Belmont College (now Belmont University). A new, modern, nonresidential girls' high school, Harpeth Hall School, was established on the Estes estate in the affluent Green Hills section of Nashville to take the place of Ward-Belmont.

The original campus remained under the aegis of the Tennessee Baptist Convention until 2007 when Belmont University became independent of its control.

== Social activities ==
Club Village was a collection of ten houses that were made for Ward-Belmont's social clubs. The social clubs included Anti-Pandora, Twentieth Century, Del Vers, Tri K, Penta Tau, X. L., Osiron, Agora, A.K., and F.F. Each of the houses included a formal club room, kitchen, game room, and music room. At the start of the academic year, students would engage in a "rushing" period in which they would learn about the different clubs. Every student who participated in this period was accepted into one of the clubs.

May Day Festival was one of the outstanding social events of the spring. This marks the culmination of the Physical Education Program, in which every student participates. The grand parade, picturesque costumes of the dancers, and the May Queen with her Court add a dramatic touch to the celebration, which is viewed by several thousand friends, parents, and alumnae.

It had a chapter of Alpha Sigma Alpha from December 15, 1905, to 1909, a chapter of Sigma Iota Chi from 1905 to 1914, and a chapter of Phi Mu Gamma from 1914 to 1915.

== Notable people ==
=== Alumnae ===
- Sophia Alcorn, educator who invented the Tadoma method of communication with people who are deaf and blind
- Birdie Alexander, musician and educator
- Carman Barnes, writer
- Elizabeth Lee Bloomstein, a history professor and club woman
- Fermine Baird Catchings, genealogist
- Mildred Sartor Compton, chemist and museum executive
- Sara Ward Conley, artist
- Nancy Cox-McCormack, sculptor
- Lura Harris Craighead, author, parliamentarian, civic worker, and club woman
- Jean Faircloth, philanthropist
- Cornelia Fort, aviator
- Elizabeth P. Farrington, publisher of the Honolulu Star-Bulletin and Congressional Delegate
- Iris Kelso, newspaper journalist and television news correspondent
- Clare Boothe Luce, editor and playwright
- Mary Martin, actress
- Olive Stokes Mix, actress
- Grace Moore, singer
- Minnie Pearl (Sarah Colley Cannon), country music comedian
- Mary U. Rothrock, librarian and president of the American Library Association
- Daisy Elizabeth McQuigg Sewell, religious leader and dean of women for Abilene Christian College
- Patricia Walton Shelby, 32nd President General of the Daughters of the American Revolution
- Mildred T. Stahlman, neonatologist
- Lila Acheson Wallace, co-founder of Reader's Digest
- Amelia Worthington Williams, historian

=== Faculty and staff ===
- Ira Landrith, college president and Presbyterian minister

== See also ==
- List of current and historical women's universities and colleges in the United States
