= George Oberkirsh Seilhamer =

American historian (1839–1916)

- Born: November 12, 1839; Franklin County, Pennsylvania, U.S.
- Died: January 12, 1916 (aged 76); Franklin Township, Pennsylvania, U.S.
- Resting place: Cedar Grove Cemetery, Chambersburg, Pennsylvania, U.S.
- Occupation: Historian
- Spouse: Mary Virginia "Jennie" Perry (m. 1860–1910; her death)

George Oberkirsh Seilhamer (November 12, 1839 – January 12, 1916) was an American historian. He was known for his documentation of early American theater and local Pennsylvania genealogy. He published several books as well as a noted periodical. His 1904 publication, Chambers: Missing Branches of Our Oldest Family, and his 1908 book The Bard Family: A History and Genealogy of the Bards of "Carroll's Delight", Together With a Chronicle of the Bards, and Genealogies of the Bard Kinship, are in the possession of the Library of Congress.

== Life and career ==
Seilhamer was born in 1839 in Franklin County, Pennsylvania, to John Seilhamer and Elizabeth Overcash. He was youngest of their eight known children, followed by John, William, Mary, James (died at five months), Aaron (died at nine months), James and Reuben. He was educated in the public schools of Franklin County, then at Milnwood Academy in Shade Gap, Pennsylvania, and the Chambersburg Academy. Before he reached the age of sixteen, he was teaching in the public schools. He taught three terms: 1855 to 1858.

In 1860, Seilhamer married Mary Virginia Perry, who was known as Jennie. They had three children: Blanche (who died in infancy), Alvin and Randall (who died aged 9).

He studied law with Nill & Kennedy in Chambersburg and was admitted to the bar in Franklin County in 1861.

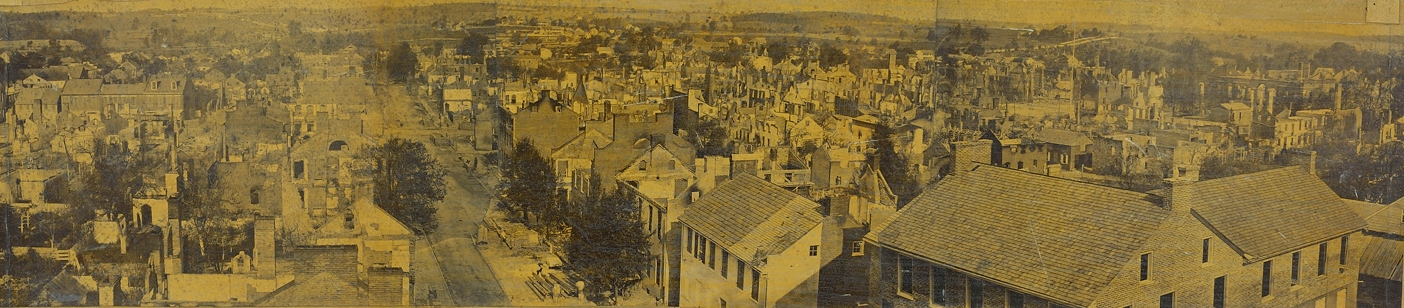
A destroyed Chambersburg in 1864

On July 30, 1864, a large portion of Chambersburg was burned down by Confederate Brig. Gen. John McCausland for failing to provide a ransom of $500,000 in U.S. currency, or $100,000 in gold.

Between 1864 and 1866, he was deputy prothonotary. He was also local editor of the Franklin Repository newspaper. In 1866, he moved to New York City to work for the New York Tribune. Between 1869 and 1870, he was editor of the Providence Press and founded the Providence Star. He went on to become a member of the New York Herald staff for a decade.

In 1872, Seilhamer published Negro Life in Jamaica in the volume XLIV, no. 262 issue of Harper's Monthly.

After returning from London on a year-long "confidential mission" in 1886, Seilhamer settled in Philadelphia for a decade, working for both the Philadelphia Times (1886–1892) and the Philadelphia Inquirer (1892–1896). With his health beginning to fail, he returned to Chambersburg, Pennsylvania, in the fall of 1896 and worked with the Kittochtinny Historical Society. Between 1888 and 1891, he published three volumes under the title History of American Theatre. In 1898, Seilhamer published History of the Republican Party. In 1905, Seilhamer began publishing a periodical titled The Kittochtinny Magazine, dedicated to the local history and genealogy of Cumberland Valley.

In 1908, Seilhamer published The Bard Family: A History and Genealogy of the Bards of "Carroll's Delight", Together With a Chronicle of the Bards, and Genealogies of the Bard Kinship. 300 copies of the book were published, with no. 151 being in the archives of the Library of Congress. In her 1918 book Baird and Beard Families: A Genealogical, Biographical and Historical Collection of Data, Fermine Baird Catchings states that much of its historical and geographical information was taken from the Seilhamer's book.

== Death ==
Seilhamer died in 1916, aged 76. He had been a widower for six years, and was interred beside his wife in Cedar Grove Cemetery in Chambersburg.
