= Mary Elvira Weeks =

American chemist and historian of science

- Born: April 10, 1892; Lyons, Wisconsin
- Died: June 20, 1975 (aged 83); Detroit, Michigan
- Education: Ripon College, University of Wisconsin–Madison, University of Kansas
- Awards: Dexter Award for Outstanding Achievement in the History of Chemistry
- Scientific career
- Fields: Chemistry, History
- Workplaces: University of Kansas

Mary Elvira Weeks (April 10, 1892 – June 20, 1975) was an American chemist and historian of science. Weeks was the first woman to receive a Ph.D. in chemistry at the University of Kansas and the first woman to be a faculty member there.

Her book Discovery of the Elements is considered the "first connected narrative of how scientists unraveled the mysteries of matter" and a "classic of chemistry". It went through seven editions and was published in multiple languages. Weeks also published A History of the American Chemical Society (1952) with Charles Albert Browne, completing it after his death in 1947.

== Education and career ==
In 1913 Weeks earned a bachelor's degree in chemistry from Ripon College where she worked with Albert F. Gilman. In 1914 she received a master's degree from the University of Wisconsin–Madison where she worked with Joseph Howard Mathews.

For seven years (1914–1921), Weeks worked as a high school teacher and chemical technician. In 1921, she took a job as a college instructor, teaching quantitative analysis at the University of Kansas while continuing to study. She completed her Ph.D. at the University of Kansas in 1927, writing a thesis on the role of hydrogen ion concentration in the precipitation of calcium and magnesium.

Once she had her Ph.D. Weeks became an assistant professor and in 1937, an associate professor. She remained in Kansas for 22 years, carrying a heavy teaching load and doing a limited amount of laboratory research. Her research tended to be in the areas of physical and analytic chemistry. While in Kansas, she began researching and writing about the history of chemistry, and published Discovery of the Elements (1933).

In 1944, Weeks left Kansas to become a research librarian at the Kresge-Hooker Science Library of Wayne State University in Detroit, Michigan. There she became head of the translation department.

Weeks retired from Wayne State in 1954 and continued to live in Detroit. Weeks continued to be active as a translator and as an editor after her retirement, working with the Record of Chemical Progress (?-1971) and Chymia (1956-1967).

Weeks was a member of the American Chemical Society, the American Association for Advancement of Science, the History of Science Society, the Special Libraries Association, the Swedish History of Science Society, Phi Beta Kappa, and Sigma Xi.

== Discovery of the Elements ==
Because her interests leaned to the humanities, Weeks was drawn to the history of chemistry. Initially, she wrote about the elements as a hobby. From 1932-1933, while at the University of Kansas, Weeks wrote a series of 21 articles on the discovery of the elements for the Journal of Chemical Education.

Due to demand for reprints, the articles were collected and published in book form in 1933. Discovery of the Elements went through multiple editions. Both book and the earlier articles were liberally illustrated with pictures of chemists from the collection of Frank B. Dains, an older Kansas colleague of Weeks.

By 1968, Discovery of the Elements had appeared in seven editions, and had been updated to include the 94 elements that were discovered between 1524 and 1964. Editions included a wartime release in limited numbers due to restrictions on use of paper. The book had been translated into multiple languages. Weeks, who spoke French, German, Italian, Japanese, Spanish, Swedish, and Russian, focused on translation for much of her time at Wayne State University.

The seventh edition was identified as a "classic of chemistry". It was hailed as "a new edition of an old favorite", a "definitive and unique work" whose "value is well established and recognized by all". Revised by Weeks and Henry M. Leicester, it contained 2,688 references and 373 illustrations. (Leicester's contribution was a chapter on the known synthetic elements — the chapter was first published in the 6th edition.) Weeks's work was one of the inspirations for The Lost Elements: The Periodic Table's Shadow Side (2015).

== A History of the American Chemical Society ==
In 1946 or 1947, Weeks began collaborating with Charles A. Browne on a retrospective history of the American Chemical Society. Browne was responsible for the structure of the project and the first nine chapters. After Browne's death in 1947, Weeks brought the project to completion, and A History of the American Chemical Society—Seventy-five Eventful Years was published in 1952. It was welcomed as avoiding the pitfalls common to commissioned histories.

The authors have assembled a scholarly work which records the accomplishments of the Society without gloating over them. They have even given attention to the difficulties of the Society and the disagreements within its membership. –Aaron J. Ihde

== Recognition ==
In 1967, Weeks won the Dexter Award for Outstanding Achievement in the History of Chemistry from the American Chemical Society.
