= Daisy Elizabeth McQuigg Sewell =

American religious leader (1876–1944)

Daisy Elizabeth McQuigg Sewell (June 19, 1876 - May 17, 1944) was an American religious leader who was active in the Churches of Christ movement in the early half of the twentieth century. She served as dean of women for Abilene Christian College from 1912 to 1924.

The daughter of Mr. and Mrs. J. Y. McQuigg, Daisy McQuigg was born in Bonham, Texas, and attended Carlton College in Bonham. She continued her education at the Ward Seminary and David Lipscomb College in Nashville, Tennessee, and the John Longman Art School in New York. Daisy McQuigg met her future husband, Jesse P. Sewell, while a student at David Lipscomb College.

Daisy Sewell assisted her husband in his work to elevate Abilene Christian from a junior college to a senior college. After leaving Abilene Christian College, Jesse P. Sewell became a preacher for the Grove Avenue Church of Christ in San Antonio, Texas, and Daisy Sewell enlarged her reputation as a Christian writer. Much of her writing was not under her name, but she wrote three well-known books: The Life of Christ, Ideal Womanhood, and The Home as God Would Have It, and was a regular contributor to the periodical The Christian Woman (Wichita, Kansas).

Daisy Sewell died at her home in San Antonio, following a stroke on May 17, 1944.

== Works ==
- Sewell, Daisy Elizabeth McQuigg. 1922. The life of Christ. Abilene, Tex: Christian College Pub. Co.
- Sewell, Daisy Elizabeth McQuigg. 1927. Ideal womanhood: a Bible study of womanhood : including a study of the women of the Old and New Testaments. Austin, Tex: Firm Foundation Pub. House.
- Sewell, Daisy McQuigg. 1937. The home as God would have it. Austin, Tex: Firm Foundation Pub. House.
