= Tennessee Baptist Children's Homes =

Tennessee Baptist Children's Homes, Inc, a non-profit organization founded in 1891, is a ministry of the churches of the Tennessee Baptist Convention which provides residential care and foster care support for children, as well as family care resources in the state. The organization has locations in all three regions of Tennessee, including campuses in Millington, Brentwood, and Chattanooga.

== History ==
In 1891, a group of women from Nashville's First Baptist Church, led by Mrs. Georgia Eastman, founded the Tennessee Baptist Orphans' Home. The Tennessee Baptist Orphans' Home was first housed in the Delaware Hotel in West Nashville. In 1911, a land was purchased from Major C.T. Cheek and the orphans' home was moved to its present location in Brentwood. For many years, children were served at this one location. In 1950, a second campus was opened in Memphis, and in 1954 one followed in Chattanooga. By the 1950s, most of the children in residence were from homes in crisis, not orphans, so board members decided in 1953 to rename the ministry to more accurately reflect its work—Tennessee Baptist Children's Homes.

The TBCH does not accept government funding. Instead, it relies on individual donors, churches, foundation, business and civic charitable contributions, and Estate planning.

== Services ==
- Residential Care

TBCH provides on-campus homes for children who are not in state custody, but whose parents or family members cannot currently provide the day-to-day care they need. These family-style homes are staffed by Christian couples serving as houseparents for up to eight resident children.

- Foster Care

TBCH, through The George Shinn Foster Care Program, partners with Tennessee’s Department of Children’s Services (DCS) to provide certified foster families for children who are in state custody. The program includes on-going support, direction and advocacy for foster parents by Foster Care Case Managers employed by TBCH.

- Family Care

TBCH provides resources for families in communities across Tennessee. They compile and maintain a network of supportive and equipping resources available through churches and other local organizations.

== Locations ==
When family crisis prevents a child from remaining in his/her home or with other family members, the Tennessee Baptist Children's Homes is there to accept children into its residential care program. Through this program, eight children live together as an active, giving family unit in campus cottages with a married couple who serve as houseparents. Each cottage is a large, family-style home with a kitchen, family room, study area, an apartment in each cottage for the houseparents, and four bedrooms for up to eight children (two children per room).

These residential campuses are located in the three regions across Tennessee:

- Brentwood: The Brentwood campus is also the location of the administrative home office for the organization.
- Chattanooga
- Millington: Millington hosts The Ranch at Millington, not just a residential campus, but also a working ranch.

Other locations include offices for their Foster Care in Jackson, and Knoxville, and approved foster care homes in dozens of other cities and towns.

== Sources ==
- Tennessee Baptist Children’s Homes
- A 'copycat' bill would allow adoption agencies to deny Tennessee gay couples. Here's who's behind it
