= Sara Ward Conley =

American artist (1859–1944)

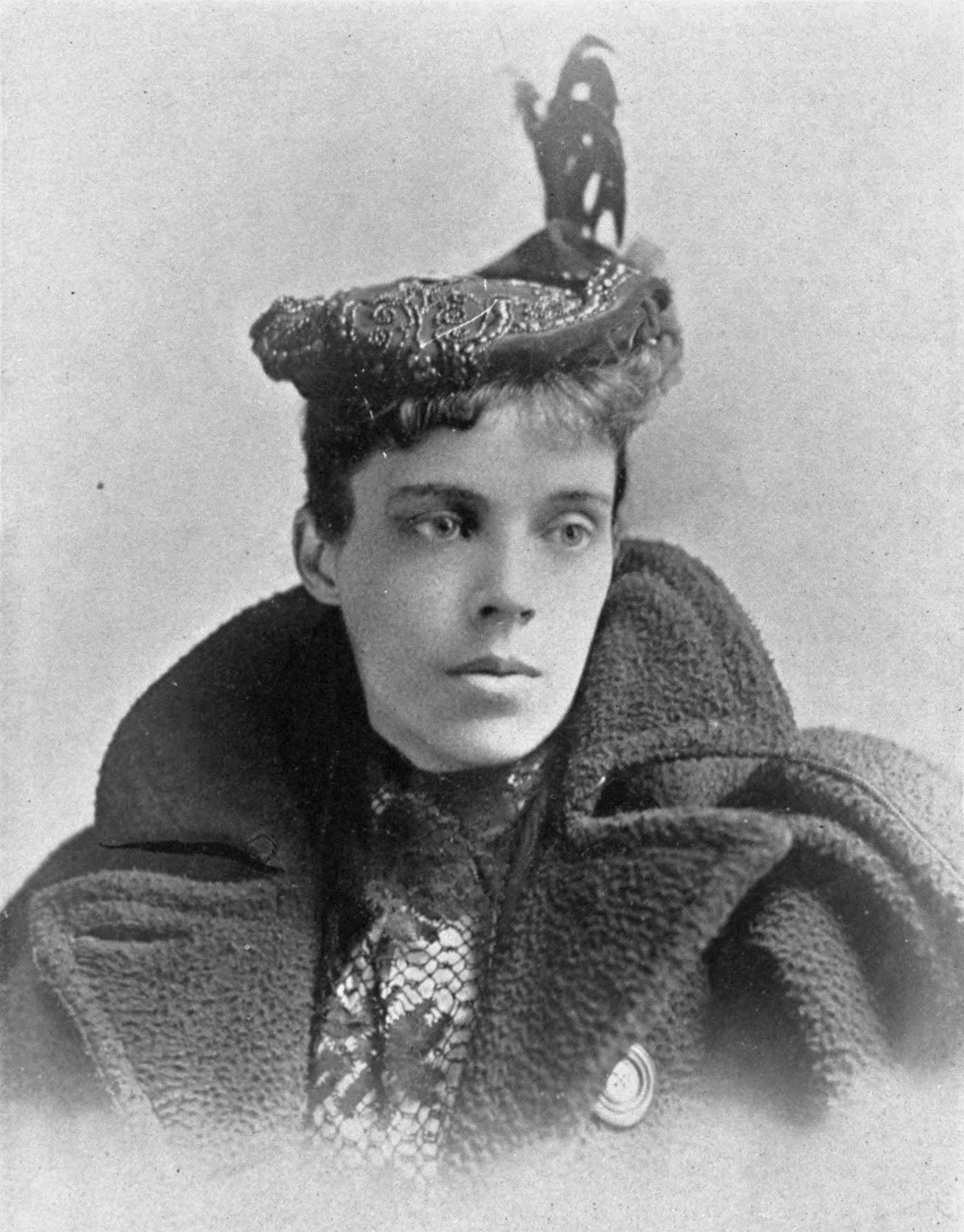
- Sara Ward Conley, from an 1896 publication.
- Born: Sara Ward; December 21, 1859; Nashville, Tennessee, US
- Died: May 6, 1944; Nashville, Tennessee, US
- Other names: S. W. Conley
- Occupation(s): artist, designer

Sara Ward Conley (December 21, 1859 – May 6, 1944) was an American artist from Nashville, Tennessee.

== Early life ==
Sara Ward Conley was born in Nashville, Tennessee, on December 21, 1859, the daughter of William Eldred Ward and Amanda Eliza Hudson Ward. She was educated at the Nashville school her father founded and ran, Ward Seminary, with further art studies in Paris and Rome.

== Career ==
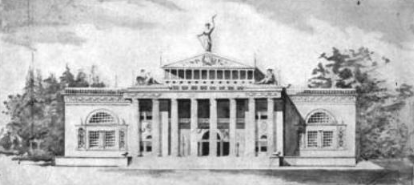
The Woman's Building at the Tennessee Centennial and International Exposition, 1896, designed by Sara Ward Conley.

Ward painted society portraits in Nashville. She also taught art as director of Ward-Conley Studios. In 1896 she designed the large two-story Woman's Building at the Tennessee Centennial and International Exposition, modeled on Andrew Jackson's Nashville home, the Hermitage. She also chaired the Fine Arts Committee that chose art for display at the exposition. "Her plans for the Woman's Building were selected by the judges without a dissenting voice," according to a report at the time.

She contributed illustrations to several issues of The Olympian magazine in 1903. In 1910, she loaned historical objects to the Appalachian Exposition. While staying at the Battle Creek Sanitarium for health reasons in 1913, she painted a mural and decorative panels in the institution's lobby and parlors. Her art was displayed at the Tennessee State Fair in 1920, and at the fifth annual exhibit of Tennessee artists in Nashville in 1924. Four of her paintings were included in the Spring Art Exhibit of the Centennial Club in 1925.

She and her sister, Mrs. John DeWitt, hosted meetings of the Ward Seminary alumnae association, and both served as officers in the organization.

== Personal life ==
Sara Ward married John Withrin Conley in 1882; her husband died in 1883. Their only child died as a young girl in 1886. Conley survived typhoid fever in 1897 and "a severe surgical operation" in New York in 1900. She used a wheelchair for the rest of her life. She died in 1944, aged 84 years, in Nashville. Her portraits of Willie Blount and William Blount were displayed at William Blount Mansion in Knoxville.
