= Birdie Alexander =

American educator and music teacher

- Born: March 24, 1870; Lincoln County, Tennessee, U.S.
- Died: August 2, 1960 (aged 90); El Paso, Texas, U.S.
- Known for: Educator

Birdie Alexander (March 24, 1870 – August 2, 1960) was an American educator and music teacher. She was a charter member of the Music Supervisors' National Conference. Alexander is credited with laying the foundations of music education in the Dallas public schools.

== Biography ==
Alexander was born on March 24, 1870, in Lincoln County, Tennessee. Later, she and her family moved to Texas and she attended school in Forney, Texas and also at Mary Nash College. She returned to Tennessee to study piano and voice at Ward Seminary, graduating in 1891. When she graduated, she and her family moved to Dallas. Alexander became the Dallas Public School's music supervisor and worked there for twelve years during which she established a "first rate system of music education." She organized special concerts for students with conductor Walter Fried. Alexander was a charter member of the Music Supervisors' National Conference, founded in 1907. When officials cut back on music programs, Alexander created her own music textbook, published in 1912, called Songs We Like to Sing. Alexander was also instrumental in bringing a victrola to play music for her students. She was also invited to lecture on music education at the University of Texas.

Alexander moved to El Paso for health reasons in 1913 after contracting tuberculosis. Her brother-in-law, Robert B. Homan, Sr., was a physician and ran a sanatorium in El Paso called Homan's San. Alexander stayed at the sanatorium for four years where she worked in the office and didn't feel that she would be able to go back to teaching music. Eventually, Alexander began to give piano lessons for her niece and word began to spread and soon Alexander had many students. There were times when she had more students than she could teach and in those situations, she would refer them to other teachers.

Alexander was made an honorary life member of the National Music Teachers' Association of Texas in 1941. Formerly, she had served as president of the organization. In addition, she put together the music department for the Texas State Teachers Association.

== Death and legacy ==
Alexander died in her home in El Paso on August 2, 1960. She was buried in Evergreen Cemetery in El Paso. An elementary school named after Alexander was dedicated in Dallas in March 1970.
