= Statue of Edward W. Carmack =

Statue formerly installed in Nashville, Tennessee, U.S.

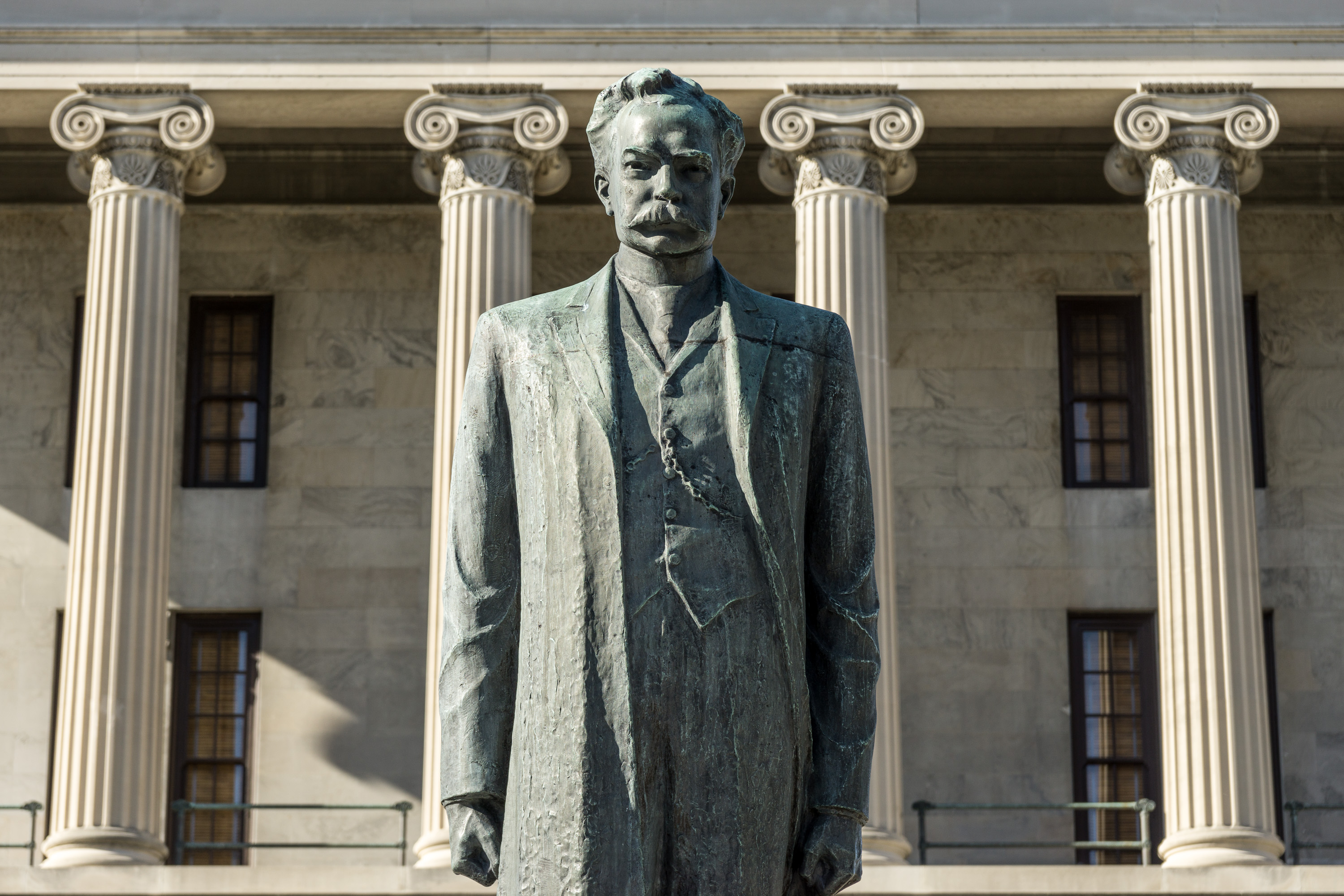
- The statue in 2016
- Artist: Nancy Cox-McCormack
- Year: 1927
- Subject: Edward W. Carmack
- Location: Nashville, Tennessee, U.S.; 36.1652°N 86.7838°W

A statue of Edward W. Carmack was installed in Nashville, Tennessee, United States in 1924. The statue was the work of American sculptor Nancy Cox-McCormack. Carmack was an opponent of Ida B. Wells and encouraged retaliation for her support of the civil rights movement.

== History ==
Carmack — formerly a US Senator — was shot and killed on November 9, 1908, by Duncan Brown Cooper and their son, Robin Cooper. Both were tried & convicted of murder, then pardoned by Governor Malcolm R. Patterson; in 1909, the Tennessee legislature provided for the creation of a memorial sculpture of him by Nancy Cox-McCormack, to be placed on the grounds of the Capitol. It was erected in 1927.

The monument was toppled by demonstrators during the George Floyd protests in 2020.

== See also ==
- List of monuments and memorials removed during the George Floyd protests
