= Temple Cemetery =

Historic Jewish cemetery in Davidson County, Tennessee, US

- U.S. National Register of Historic Places
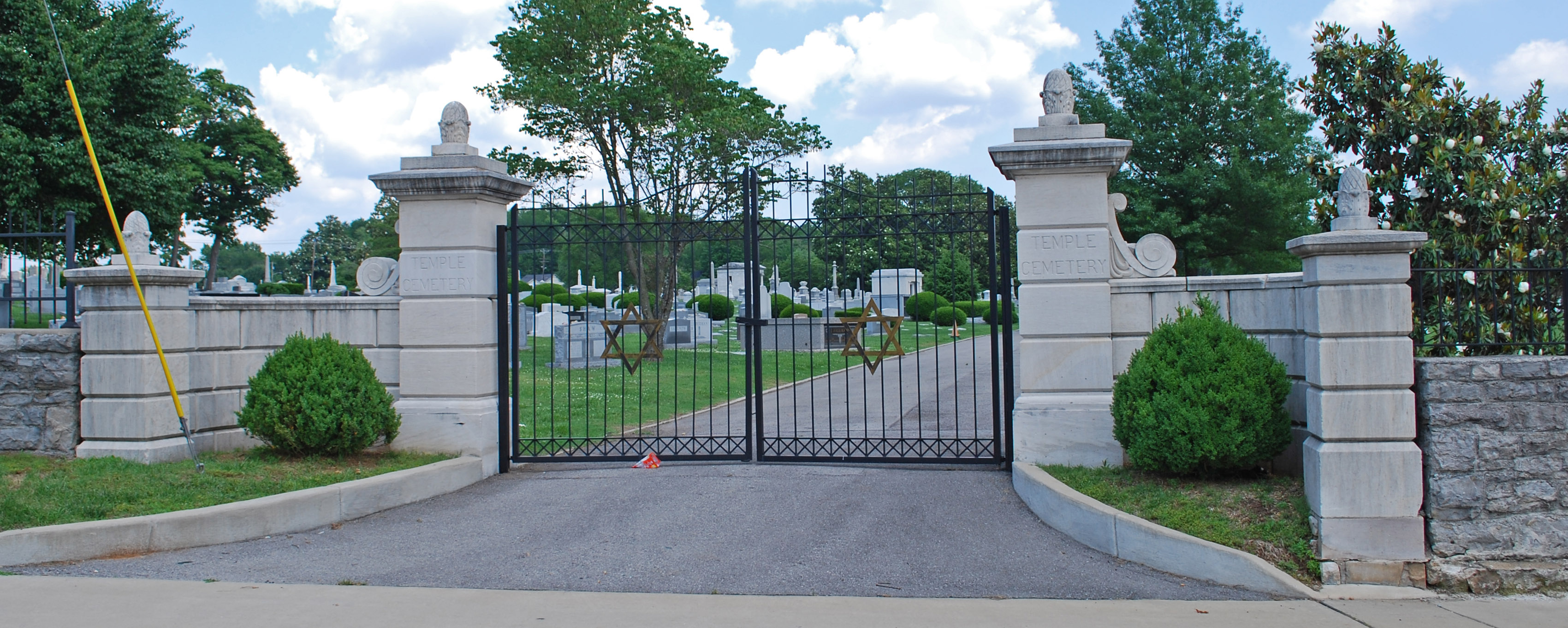
- The Temple Cemetery in 2010

- Location within Tennessee Location within the United States
- Location: 2001 15th Avenue North, Nashville, Tennessee
- Coordinates: 36°11′04″N 86°48′41″W
- Area: 9.3 acres (3.8 ha)
- Architect: Coen, William; et.al.
- NRHP reference No.: 04000440
- Added to NRHP: May 12, 2004

The Temple Cemetery is a historic Jewish cemetery in Nashville, Tennessee, United States. Established in 1851, it is the oldest Jewish cemetery in Tennessee. It spans 9.25 acres in North Nashville, and it is owned by Congregation Ohabai Sholom. It is listed on the National Register of Historic Places.

== History ==
The cemetery was established in 1851, when Isaac Garritson, Jacob Mitchell, and Michael Powers of the Hebrew Benevolent Burial Society purchased three acres of land from James C. Owen. Owen was the co-owner of the Buena Vista Turnpike Company. The layout of the cemetery was designed by Wilbur F. Foster (the founder of the Foster and Creighton Company), and the main road was built by William Coen. The first tombstone was installed in 1854. Over the years, the cemetery expanded to 9.25 acres, with over 3,000 burials. It includes six mausolea, designed in the Classical Revival or Egyptian Revival architectural styles. Alongside Stars of David, there are Masonic symbols.

The cemetery has been listed on the National Register of Historic Places since May 12, 2004. A historical marker was installed in 2005. With grants from the Tennessee Historical Commission and private donations, it was refurbished and rededicated in 2007. It is owned by Congregation Ohabai Sholom, a Reform congregation based in Belle Meade, Tennessee.

== Notable interments ==
- Elizabeth Lee Bloomstein (1859—1927) American history professor, clubwoman, and suffragist
