= Henry M. Leicester =

American biochemist

Henry Marshall Leicester (December 22, 1906, San Francisco – April 29, 1991, Menlo Park) was an American biochemist and historian of chemistry.

== Biography ==
Henry M. Leicester grew up in San Francisco. His parents were among the earliest members of the Sierra Club and he was the youngest of their three children. At age 16 he graduated from San Francisco's Lowell High School. At Stanford University, he studied chemistry and graduated with a bachelor's degree in 1927, a master's degree in 1928, and a doctorate in biochemistry in 1930. His doctoral dissertation is entitled Aromatic selenonium salts and the relative electronegativities of organic radicals. During Leicester's years of study at Stanford, Robert E. Swain was the head of the chemistry department.

From 1930 to 1938 during the Great Depression, Leicester travelled in Europe (including research in Zurich and London); he spent a year as an instructor at Oberlin College, part of a year at the Carnegie Institution, and one year as a research associate at Stanford. From 1929 to 1936 he co-authored six papers with Francis William Bergstrom on selenium compounds, a paper with Leopold Ružička on betulin derivatives, a paper with Thomas Midgley Jr. on polystyrene, and two papers with Albert Leon Henne on organic fluorine compounds. From 1938 to 1940 Leicester was a research associate at Ohio State University. There he became interested in the history of chemistry in Russia. Leicester corresponded extensively with chemists in the Soviet Union and gathered a large collection of Russian books on the history of science. He eventually donated his collection to Stanford University.

At the College of Physicians and Surgeons, San Francisco (now the University of the Pacific Arthur A. Dugoni School of Dentistry), Leicester was a professor of biochemistry from 1941 to 1977, when he retired as professor emeritus. He chaired the departments of physiology and biology and also headed the college's research program. From 1947 to 1951 he chaired the Division of the History of Chemistry (HIST) of the American Chemical Society (ACS). He was one of the founders of the journal Chymia and served as the journal's editor-in-chief from 1950 to 1967. He was the author, editor, or translator of seven books. With his long-term collaborator Herbert S. Klickstein (1921–1975), he edited the book A Source Book in Chemistry, 1400-1900 (McGraw-Hill, 1952). The book contains selection from 82 authors and ends with a bibliography of biographies from periodicals and books. Leicester and Klickstein published in 1947 a 42-page article Philately: A Chapter In The History Of Chemistry in the Journal of the History of Medicine and Allied Sciences. The article deals with the chemical composition of stamps and the role of chemistry in stamp production. For the 6th and 7th editions of the book Discovery of the Elements by Mary Elvira Weeks, Leicester contributed a chapter on the discovery of synthetic elements.

Leicester was a prolific author on the history of chemistry. He contributed one article to Collier's Encyclopedia Americana, 7 articles to the Encyclopaedia Britannica, and 21 biographies to the Dictionary of Scientific Biography (1970–1978). He also was an authority on caries and, during the 1950s and 1960s at California community meetings, strongly advocated water fluoridation.

Leicester gained an international reputation as an expert on the history of chemistry in Russia. In 1962 he received the Dexter Award (now renamed the "HIST Award for Outstanding Achievement in the History of Chemistry"); he entitled his acceptance address Some Aspects of the History of Chemistry in Russia.

In 1941 Henry Leicester married Leonore Azevedo (1914–1974). They had a son and two daughters. Their son, Henry Marshal Leicester Jr. (b. 1942), became a professor of English literature at the University of California, Santa Cruz and wrote The Disenchanted Self: Representing the Subject in the Canterbury Tales (1990, University of California Press).

== Selected publications ==
=== Articles ===
- Leicester, Henry M. (1940). "Alexander Mikhaĭlovich Butlerov". Journal of Chemical Education. 17 (5): 203. Bibcode:1940JChEd..17..203L. doi:10.1021/ed017p203.
- Leicester, Henry M. (1941). "Vladimir Vasil'evich Markovnikov". Journal of Chemical Education. 18 (2): 53. Bibcode:1941JChEd..18...53L. doi:10.1021/ed018p53.
- Leicester, Henry M. (1943). "The New Almaden mine, the first chemical industry in California". Journal of Chemical Education. 20 (5): 235. Bibcode:1943JChEd..20..235L. doi:10.1021/ed020p235.
- Leicester, Henry M. (1945). "Tobias Lowitz—Discoverer of basic laboratory methods". Journal of Chemical Education. 22 (3): 149. Bibcode:1945JChEd..22..149L. doi:10.1021/ed022p149.
- Leicester, Henry M. (1947). "The history of chemistry in Russia prior to 1900". Journal of Chemical Education. 24 (9): 438. Bibcode:1947JChEd..24..438L. doi:10.1021/ed024p438.
- Klickstein, Herbert S.; Leicester, Henry M. (1947). "Philately—A Chapter in the History of Chemistry". Journal of the History of Medicine and Allied Sciences. 2 (3): 337–378. doi:10.1093/jhmas/II.3.337. JSTOR 24619622. PMID 20266807.
- Leicester, Henry M. (1948). "Factors Which Led Mendeleev to the Periodic Law". Chymia. 1: 67–74. doi:10.2307/27757115. JSTOR 27757115.
- Leicester, Henry M. (1948). "Mendeleev and the Russian Academy of Sciences". Journal of Chemical Education. 25 (8): 439. Bibcode:1948JChEd..25..439L. doi:10.1021/ed025p439. 1948
- Leicester, H. M. (1951). "History of Chemistry". Industrial & Engineering Chemistry. 43 (5): 1053–1056. doi:10.1021/ie50497a017.
- Leicester, Henry M. (1951). "Germain Henri Hess and the foundations of thermochemistry". Journal of Chemical Education. 28 (11): 581. Bibcode:1951JChEd..28..581L. doi:10.1021/ed028p581.
- Leicester, Henry M. (1951). "Dumas, Davy, and Liebig". Journal of Chemical Education. 28 (7): 352. Bibcode:1951JChEd..28..352L. doi:10.1021/ed028p352.
- Leicester, H.M. (1957). "The Historical Background of Chemistry". Soil Science. 83 (5): 413. Bibcode:1957SoilS..83..413L. doi:10.1097/00010694-195705000-00009.
- Leicester, Henry M. (1959). "Contributions of Butlerov to the development of structural theory". Journal of Chemical Education. 36 (7): 328. Bibcode:1959JChEd..36..328L. doi:10.1021/ed036p328.
- Leicester, Henry M. (1959). "The Spread of the Theory of Lavoisier in Russia". Chymia. 5: 138–144. doi:10.2307/27757181. JSTOR 27757181.
- Leicester, Henry M. (1961). "Chemistry, Chemical Technology, and Scientific Progress". Technology and Culture. 2 (4): 352–356. doi:10.2307/3100890. JSTOR 3100890.
- Schatz, Albert; Martin, Joseph J.; Fosdick, L.S.; Leicester, Henry M. (1962). "The proteolysis-chelation theory of dental caries". The Journal of the American Dental Association. 65 (3): 368–375. doi:10.14219/jada.archive.1962.0265. PMID 14498070.
- Leicester, Henry M. (1966). "Kekulé, Butlerov, Markovnikov: Controversies on Chemical Structure from 1860 to 1870". Kekulé Centennial. Advances in Chemistry. Vol. 61. pp. 13–23. doi:10.1021/ba-1966-0061.ch002. ISBN 978-0-8412-0062-3.
- Leicester, Henry M. (1967). "Boyle, Lomonosov, Lavoisier, and the Corpuscular Theory of Matter". Isis. 58 (2): 240–244. doi:10.1086/350230.
- Leicester, Henry M. (1975). "Lomonosov's Views on Combustion and Phlogiston". Ambix. 22: 1–9. doi:10.1179/amb.1975.22.1.1.

=== Books ===
- Leicester, Henry Marshall (1949). Biochemistry of the teeth. St. Louis: C. V. Mosby. LCCN 49001359.
- Leicester, Henry Marshall; Klickstein, Herbert S., eds. (1952). A Source Book in Chemistry, 1400-1900. Harvard University Press. ISBN 978-0-674-82230-6. LCCN 51012625.
  - title page, 1963 edition LCCN 63-16776
- Leicester, H. M. (1956). The Historical Background of Chemistry. Wiley. LCCN 56008001.
  - pbk Dover reprint. Courier Corporation. 1971. ISBN 978-0-486-61053-5. LCCN 79166426.
- Mikhail Vasil'evich Lomonosov on the Corpuscular Theory. Harvard University Press. 1970. ISBN 0674574206. LCCN 73095927; translated, with an introduction, by Henry Marshall Leicester
- Leicester, Henry M., ed. (1968). A sourcebook in chemistry 1900-1950. Harvard University Press. LCCN 68014263.
- Leicester, Henry Marshall (1974). Development of Biochemical Concepts from Ancient to Modern Times. Harvard University Press. ISBN 0674200187. LCCN 73083965.
- Weeks, Mary Elvira (1968). Discovery of the Elements (7th ed.). Easton, Pennsylvania: Journal of Chemical Education. LCCN 68015217; completely revised with new material added by Henry M. Leicester; illustrations collected by Frank B. Dains
