= Nancy Cox-McCormack =

American sculptor (1885–1967)

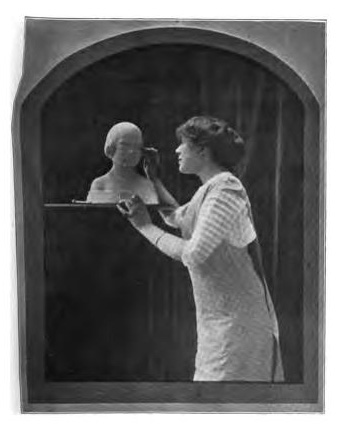
- Nannie M. McCormack, ca.1912
- Born: Nancy Mal Cox; August 15, 1885; Nashville, Tennessee, U.S.
- Died: February 17, 1967 (aged 81); Ithaca, New York, U.S.
- Occupations: Sculptor; Author
- Spouses: Mark McCormack; Charles Thomas Cushman
- Parents: Herschel McCullough Cox; Nancy Morgan Cox

Signature
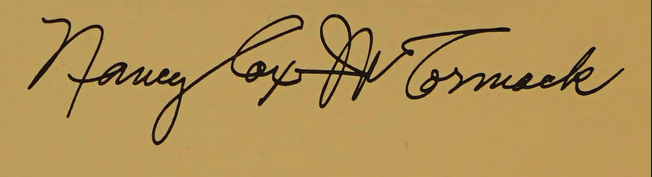

Nancy Cox-McCormack, later Cushman (August 15, 1885 – February 17, 1967), was an American sculptor, writer and socialite. Between 1910 and 1953 she sculpted bronze and terra cotta busts and bas reliefs of more than seventy sitters, including such notables as social reformer Jane Addams, lawyer Clarence Darrow, poet Ezra Pound, Italian dictator Benito Mussolini, Spanish dictator Miguel Primo de Rivera and Indian politician Mohandas K. Gandhi. Of the works she is known to have created, the location of only half is currently known.

== Early life ==
Nancy "Nannie" Mal (or Mai) Cox was born in Nashville, Tennessee, on August 15, 1885, the second of three children of Herschel McCullough Cox and Nancy Morgan Cox, a well-off Virginia couple. Nancy and her siblings contracted polio when Nancy was about three, and her sister and brother died of the disease in May 1888. Nancy's mother died of tuberculosis on December 13, 1888.

Herschel McCullough Cox remarried and had a son, Henry Herschel Cox, with his second wife, Lena Lillian Warren. Herschel died in an accident when Cox-McCormack was a teenager on December 31, 1899.

Cox-McCormack lived at a boarding school in Arkansas, then briefly with her stepmother in Nashville, Tennessee where she attended Ward Seminary. There she studied with artist Willie Betty Newman, working in pastels and watercolors.

In 1909, Cox-McCormack enrolled briefly in the St. Louis School of Fine Arts at Washington University in St. Louis. where she worked with Victor Holm.

== Career ==
=== Chicago ===
In 1910, Cox-McCormack moved to Chicago, and enrolled at the Art Institute of Chicago, where she studied sculpture with Charles Mulligan. She opened a studio in the Tree Studio Building in Chicago. She lived and worked primarily in Chicago until 1920 during which time she sculpted over twenty-five pieces and wrote Peeps, The Really Truly Sunshine Fairy, a children's book published in 1918. It was during this time in Chicago that her life intersected with many well known people such as Clarence Darrow, Grace Hegger Lewis, Alice Gerstenberg, Eunice Tietjens, and Frank Lloyd Wright.

The first sculpture that she sold, entitled "Harmony", was shown at the January 1913 Chicago Artists Exhibition at the Art Institute of Chicago. She also entered and won the Edward Ward Carmack Memorial Competition, Nashville. She was chosen to create panels on the themes "Woman in the Home" and "Woman in Civics" for the Rockford Women's Club in Rockford, Illinois. She also created altar panels of "The Annunciation" and "The Birth of Christ" for Trinity Episcopal Church in Chicago. She created a number of portrait sculptures during this period, including George and Frederick Woodruff of the First National Bank, and at least one death mask.

Her entry in the Chicago social and club register of 1921 reads:

McCORMACK, Nancy Mai (Cox). Educated Ward Seminary, Nashville, Tenn.; Clubs Member of Art Institute; Activities Sculptor, principal works "Harmony", McCormack Memorial on capitol grounds, Nashville, Tenn., bust of W. H. Mitchell, also various statues, portraits of children, etc. Residence 19 E. Pearson St.

=== Europe ===
During the 1920s, Cox-McCormack traveled extensively in Europe. She visited France, Germany, Italy, Spain, and England, and established studios at Via Margutta 48 in Rome, Italy (1922–1924). She sculpted figures of a number of important people including Benito Mussolini, U. S. Ambassador Henry P. Fletcher, archaeologist Giacomo Boni, and political saloniste Lydia Rismondo.

In Paris in July 1921, Cox-McCormack met Ezra Pound. In December 1921, she cast a life-mask of him, and modeled a small portrait-bust. In 1922 and 1923 she met Ezra Pound and his wife Dorothy again in Siena and in Rome.

Through a chain of friendships, Cox-McCormack was able to meet and model Benito Mussolini, who had just risen to power in Italy, evoking widespread excitement among Cox-McCormack and her friends. Cox-McCormack had been in Rome during Mussolini's March on Rome, and had seen what was happening at first hand. "Every artist I knew... was enthusiastic about the 'stellone' (great star) who had appeared in the sky 'to save Italy from utter ruin.'" She considered him "a creative force" and "the inspiration of the new epoch in Europe". She completed his bust in ten sittings during May and June 1923. It was the first bust made of the new ruler. (Years later, she became disenchanted with Mussolini's regime).

During the 1920s, Cox-McCormack exhibited in Rome, Paris, New York, and Chicago. Pieces produced during this time were exhibited in Paris at the Galleries Jacques Seligman, the Salon of 1923, and at the 1923-24 Exposition Biennale Internationale des Beaux Arts in Rome.

Her one-woman shows then included:

- the Jacques Seligman Galleries in both Paris and New York
- the National Gallery in Washington
- the Art Institute of Chicago
- the California Palace of the Legion of Honor in San Francisco.

In 1931, she traveled to England to model Mahatma Gandhi, who was then attending the Indian Conference in London.

=== Writing and later career ===
Cushman returned to the United States in 1924 settling in New York and Pennsylvania where she wrote her memoirs and a book, Pleasant Days in Spain, which includes an account of modeling the Spanish dictator, Miguel Primo de Rivera.

During the next eight years she sculpted a number of portrait busts and a bas-relief memorial medallion of Jane Addams. She continued to work on her memoirs and traveled throughout the United States speaking of her experiences.

She appeared on the NBC Woman's Radio Review in 1936.

=== Legacy ===
Her work received little critical attention during her lifetime or since, but local newspapers covered her work and travels extensively.

== Personal life ==
Unhappy in her home life, Cox-McCormack married Mark McCormack in 1903, but separated from him in 1909 and divorced as of 1911.

Cox-McCormack married Charles Thomas Cushman of Brooklyn Heights, New York City on December 21, 1939. The couple settled at 62 Montague Street, Brooklyn Heights, New York City. In the 1950s, they returned to Europe together, visiting Sicily, Rome and Florence. In December 1955, they moved to Ithaca, New York. The pair traveled extensively until his death in 1962. Her last work was her husband's tombstone.

== Death ==
Nancy Cox-McCormack died in Ithaca, New York on February 17, 1967.

== Gallery ==
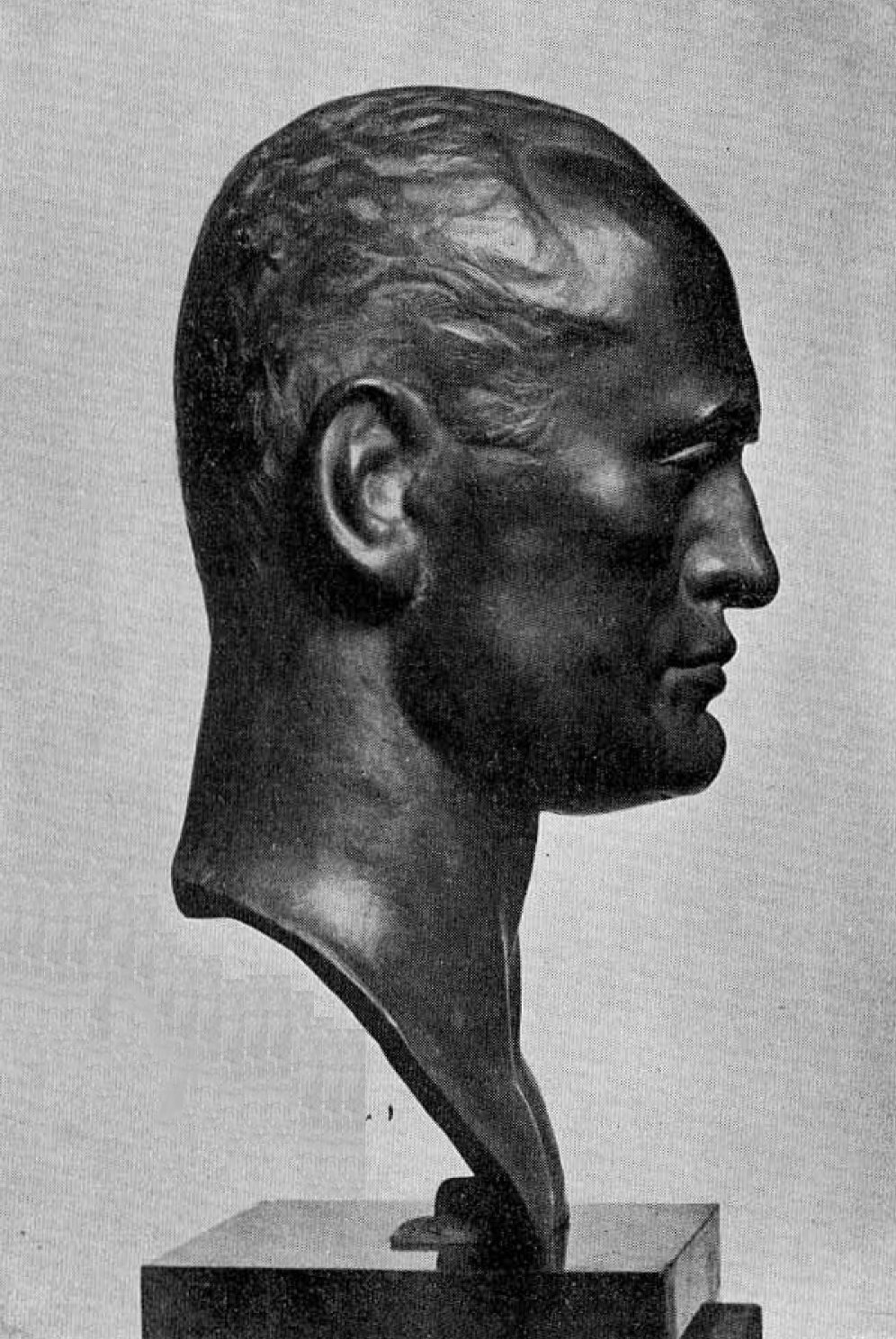
Benito Mussolini

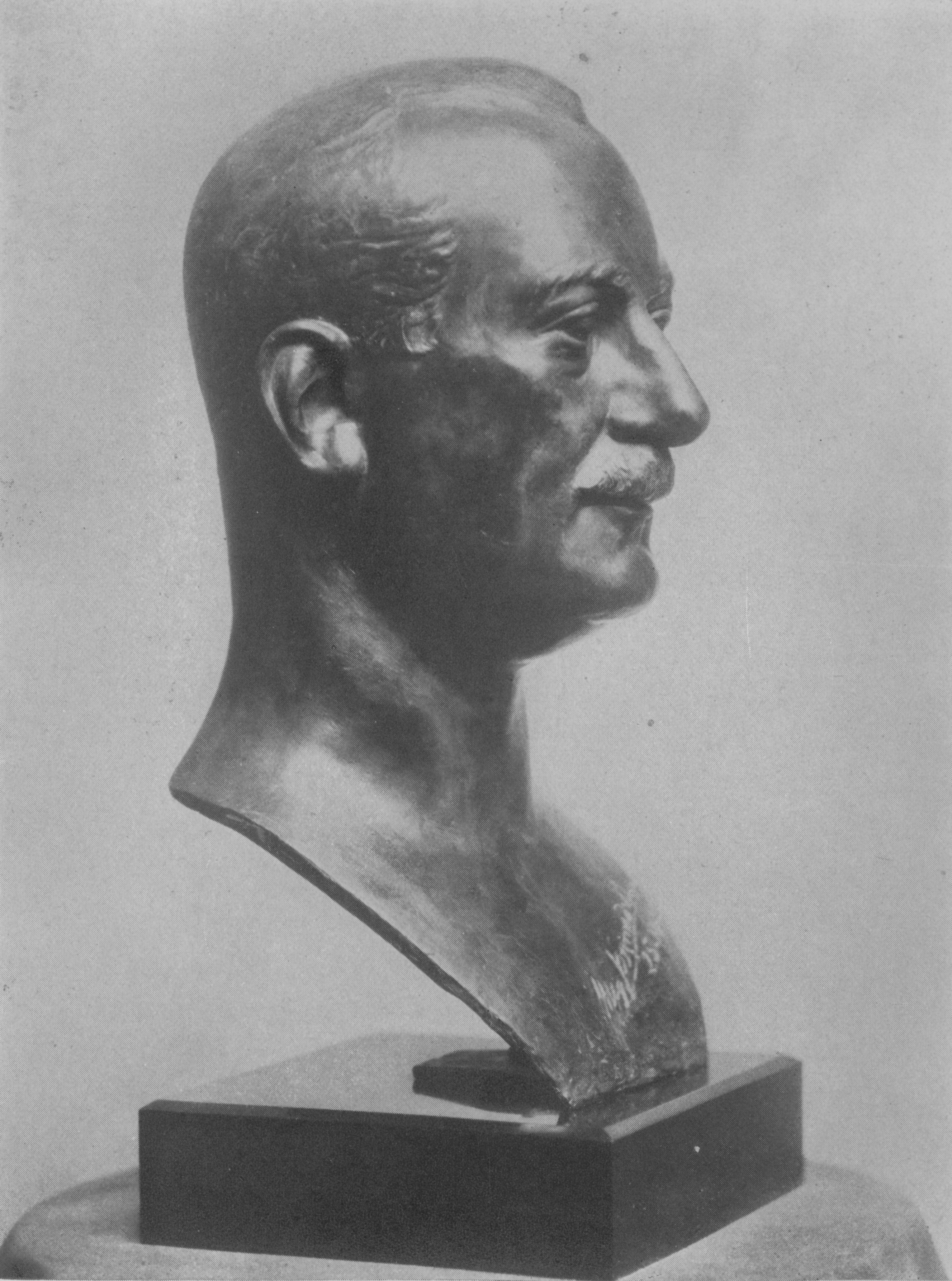
General Primo de Rivera

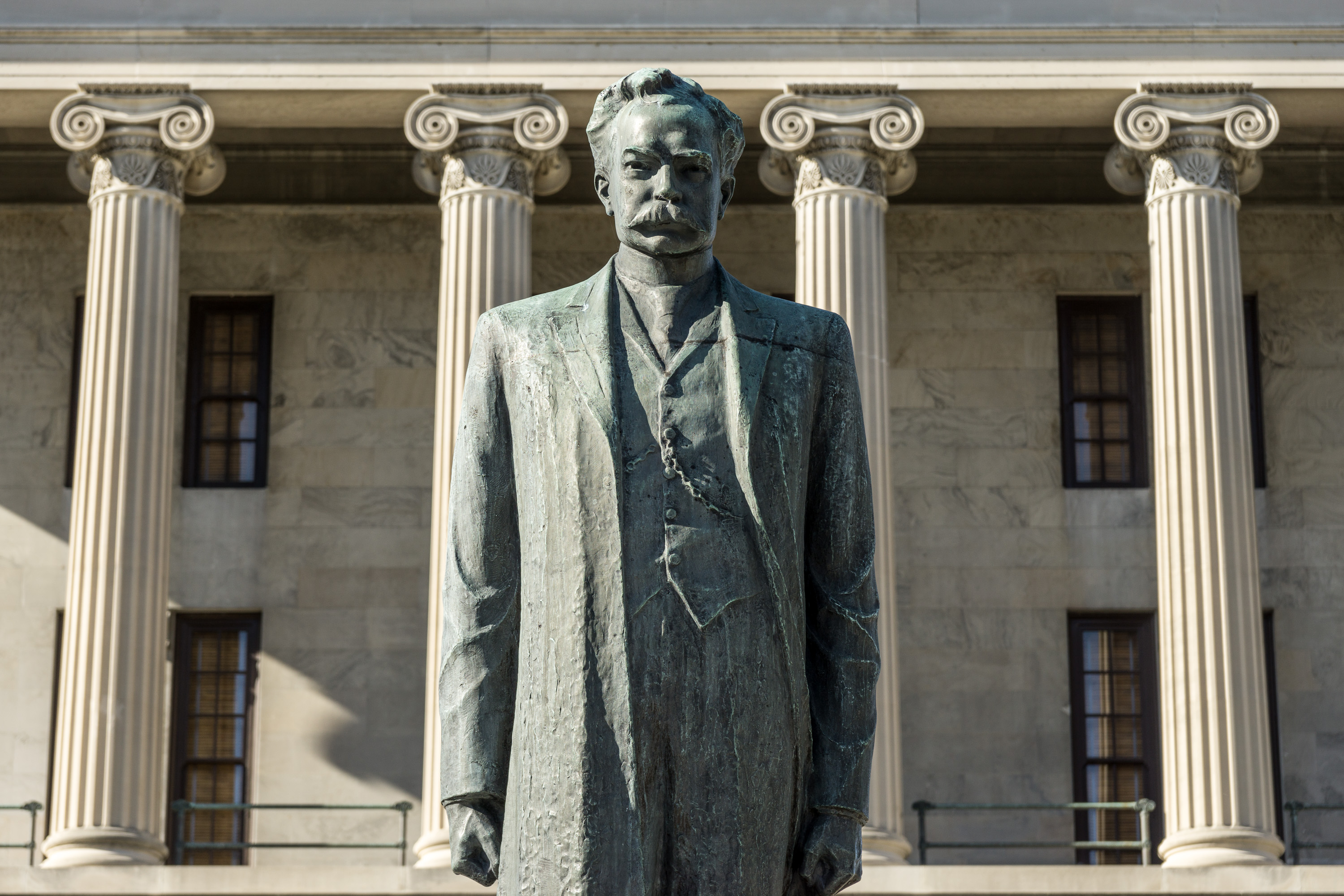
Statue of Edward W. Carmack, Nashville, Tennessee
