= Fermine Baird Catchings =

American historian (1858–1944)

- Born: December 20, 1858; Winchester, Tennessee, U.S.
- Died: January 16, 1944 (aged 85); Hempstead, New York, U.S.
- Resting place: Woodlawn Cemetery, Bronx, U.S.
- Occupations: Historian, genealogist
- Spouse: William Benjamin Catchings (m. 1879–1907; his death)

Fermine Baird "Fanny" Catchings (December 20, 1858 – January 16, 1944) was an American historian and genealogist. Her eight-volume, 230-page publication Baird and Beard Families: A Genealogical, Biographical and Historical Collection of Data (1918) was described as "an excellent compilation comprising chapters on [the] ancient history of the [Baird and Beard] family" and was "heartily recommended to all genealogical libraries." A copy of the book is in the possession of the Library of Congress.

== Life and career ==
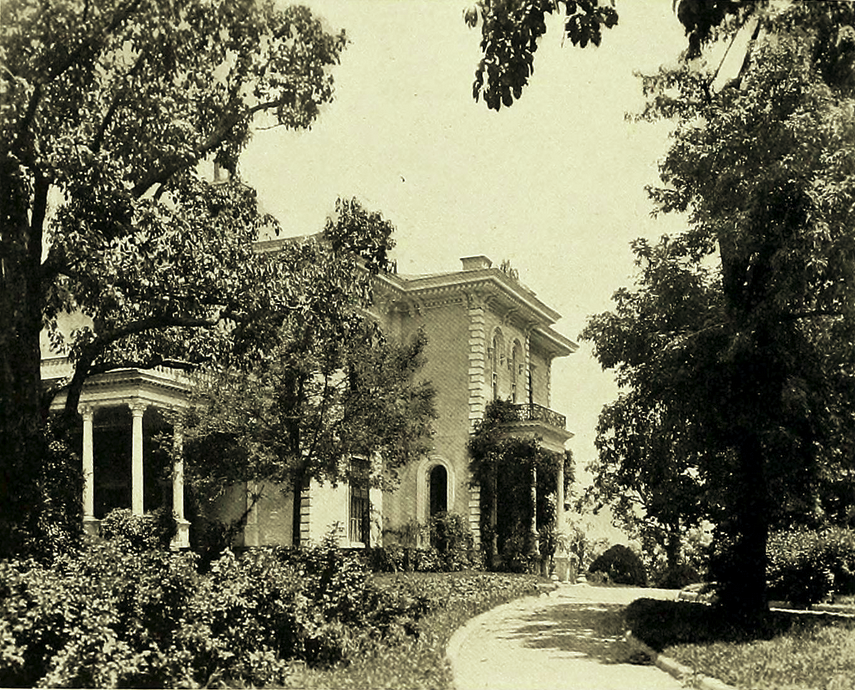
Ward Seminary in 1911

Fermine Baird was born in 1858 in Winchester, Tennessee, to Reverend Alexander Jackson Baird and Nellie Hibbets Britton. She was the youngest of their three children, following Susan and William, the latter of whom preceded her by three years. The family moved to Nashville, Tennessee, in 1865, when Baird's father took charge at First Cumberland Presbyterian Church. She attended Ward's Seminary (later Ward-Belmont College) in Nashville.

In 1879, Baird married William Benjamin Catchings, of Vicksburg, Mississippi, with whom she had seven children: Benjamin, Nellie (died in infancy), twins Baird and Silas (who died in infancy), Marjorie, Thomas and William.

In 1918, Catchings published her life's work, titled Baird and Beard Families: A Genealogical, Biographical and Historical Collection of Data. It traces the family back to 1066, when a member of the family traveled from France to England with William the Conqueror. In the book's preface, she states that much of its historical and geographical information was taken from the book A Chronicle of the Bards by George Oberkirsh Seilhamer.

When her book was published, Baird, by now a widow, was living at 507 Fifth Avenue in Manhattan, New York.

== Death ==
Catchings died in 1944, aged 85, in Hempstead, New York. She had survived her husband by 37 years, and was interred beside him in Woodlawn Cemetery in the Bronx, New York. Her brother, William, was killed in 1933, aged 78, after being struck by a car in Miami while crossing the street.
