= Elizabeth Lee Bloomstein =

American historian (1859–1927)

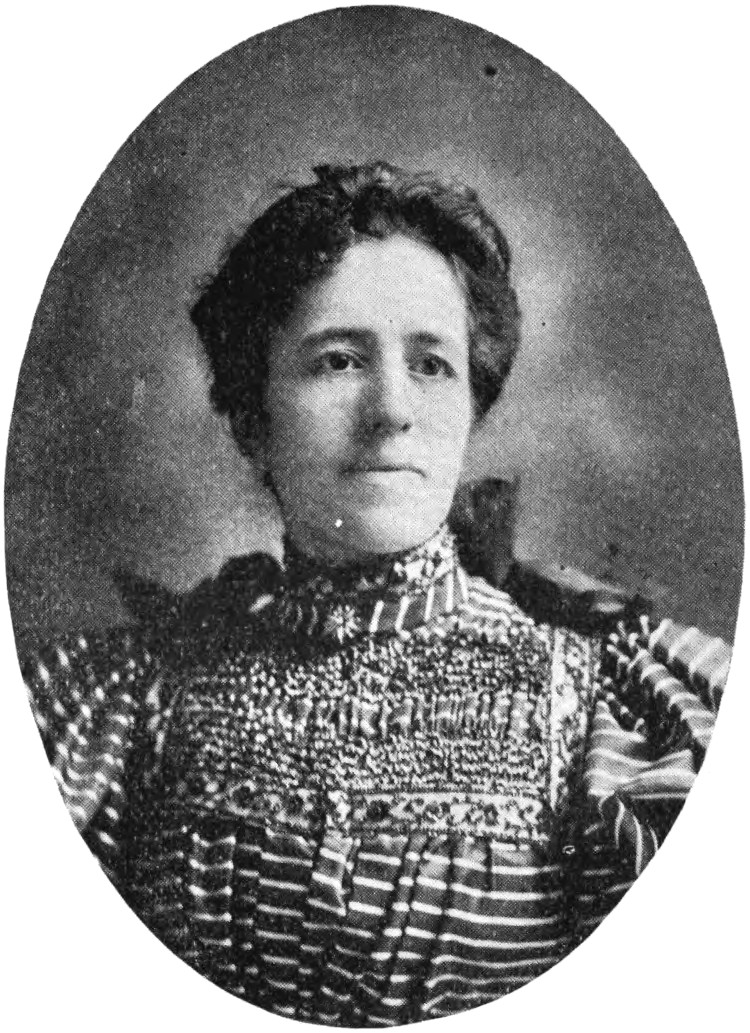
- Born: January 8, 1859; Nashville, Tennessee, U.S.
- Died: June 2, 1927 (aged 68); Nashville, Tennessee, U.S.
- Resting place: Temple Cemetery
- Education: Ward Seminary; George Peabody College for Teachers
- Occupation: Historian
- Employer: George Peabody College for Teachers

Elizabeth Lee Bloomstein (January 8, 1859 – June 2, 1927) was an American history professor, university librarian, clubwoman, and suffragist based in Nashville, Tennessee.

== Early life and education ==
Elizabeth Lee Bloomstein was born in 1859 into a prominent Jewish family in Nashville, Tennessee, the daughter of Jacob and Esther Miriam Bloomstein. She graduated from Ward Seminary before attending George Peabody College for Teachers. She was one of thirteen young women in the first graduation class from Peabody, the class of 1877. She pursued further studies during summers at other universities and during travel abroad.

== Career ==
Bloomstein served as professor of history at George Peabody College for Teachers. She was a member of the first executive committee of the Tennessee History Teachers' Association, when it was organized in 1912.

Off-campus, she was president of the Magazine Club, a women's literary organization in Nashville. She was also active in the Twentieth Century Club, the Ladies' Hermitage Association, the Women's Association of the University of Nashville, the Tennessee Women's Press Club, the Women's Historical Association, the Art Association, and the United Daughters of the Confederacy (UDC). She was also a member of the Southern Rejection League, a temperance organization, and the Housekeepers' Club, a public hygiene group. She chaired the education committee of the Tennessee Federation of Women's Clubs, and was on the education committee of the National Federation of Women's Clubs. "I believe that the women's club movement is the consciousness of a desire for larger relations of life," she explained. She was also a member of the United Daughters of the Confederacy (UDC).

In 1897, Bloomstein gave an address, "The Decoration of the Parthenon," at the Tennessee Centennial and International Exposition. During World War I, Bloomstein was a member of Nashville's Women's Committee of the Council of National Defense.

== Later life ==
Bloomstein died of pneumonia on June 2, 1927, at her Memorial Square Apartment home in Nashville. Her remains were interred at Temple Cemetery in Nashville. There is a Lizzie Lee Bloomstein Fellowship for graduate students at Vanderbilt University.
