= Sophia Alcorn =

Sophia Kindrick Alcorn
- Kentucky educator and inventor of the Tadoma method and the "Alcorn Symbols" still used by teachers of deaf students today
- Born: August 3, 1883; Stanford in Lincoln County, Kentucky
- Died: November 28, 1967 (aged 84); Stanford, Kentucky
- Occupations: Educator, Principal
- Parent(s): Sophie Ann Kindrick and James Walker Alcorn

Sophia Kindrick Alcorn (August 3, 1883 – November 28, 1967) was an educator who invented the Tadoma method of communication with people who are deaf and blind. She advocated for the rights of people with disabilities and upon retiring from her long career in teaching, she worked with the American Foundation for the Blind.

== Background ==
Sophia Kindrick Alcorn was born the youngest of seven children of James Walker and Sophie Ann (Kindrick) Alcorn in Stanford, Kentucky, on August 3, 1883. Annie Alcorn was the eldest of her siblings, marrying in November 1899 James N. Saunders who practiced law in her father's office. Her only brother, Kindrick Sommers Alcorn (1880–1966) graduated from Stanford Male Academy and then nearby Centre College, getting his law degree from the University of Virginia. He practiced law with his father and became a popular circuit judge from the 1930s-50s.

Alcorn attended Ward Seminary in Nashville, Tennessee and then went on to receive training in teaching the deaf at Clark School in Northampton, Massachusetts. She earned her M.A. degree from Wayne University in Detroit, Michigan. There she assisted in training teachers and served as a principal in the deaf school system.

== Career ==
Alcorn moved to Morganton, North Carolina to teach for one year at the North Carolina School for the Deaf (1908–09), then returned to Kentucky, teaching at the Kentucky School for the Deaf in Danville, Kentucky. The Kentucky School for the Deaf is the oldest state-supported school of its type in the U.S. and was the first school for the deaf west of the Alleghenies. Alcorn taught there from 1909 to 1920, and it was here that she first developed the Tadoma method.

In November 1910 the eight-year-old Oma Simpson came to the school. Oma had been deaf since birth and meningitis at age two had left her totally blind. She was the school's first deafblind student and was assigned to the charge of "Miss Sophie." Alcorn realized that the manual alphabet would not work and she started to teach her oral speech instead. Adopting the methods of the famous Anne Sullivan, teacher and lifelong companion to Helen Keller, Alcorn invented a system of touch on the cheek and neck to allow the child to imitate how to speak words. She taught Oma for ten years, working on U.S. history, geography and mathematics—as well as knitting, weaving and touch-typing. Oma was the first deafblind person in the world to be educated orally.

When the Simpson family left Kentucky, Alcorn moved with them to answer the plea of the father of a deafblind boy, Winthrop (Tad) Chapman. She began teaching at the South Dakota School for the Deaf and worked with Tad for four years, perfecting her system of what she called the Tadoma Tactile-Sense Method. She pioneered a system of visual symbols, first using pipe cleaners to easily create the shapes. She named her method Tadoma after these two children: Tad and Oma. (See more on Tad Chapman at his niece's blog.)

Alcorn had trained a colleague at the South Dakota school, Inis B. Hall, on the Tadoma method. Hall took over the education of Tad Chapman when Alcorn left for Detroit to research the use of vibration techniques in teaching language and speech to sighted deaf children. When Chapman was accepted in 1931 to attend the Perkins School for the Blind in Massachusetts, Hall accompanied him and introduced Alcorn's Tadoma system to the teachers there. Until the mid-1950s Tadoma was the preferred method of teaching oral speech to children who were deafblind.

After Alcorn left the South Dakota School for the Deaf, she taught at the Day School in Des Moines, Iowa (1925–25). She also taught at the Oral School in Cincinnati from 1927 to 1929. In 1930, she taught at the New Jersey School for the Deaf, and then moved to Detroit to work at the School for the Deaf where she stayed until she retired in 1953. In Detroit she served as teacher and supervising principal.

== Later years and retirement ==
When she retired, Alcorn returned to Stanford where she became a member of the Stanford Woman's Club and served as the first woman elder in the Stanford Presbyterian Church. The critical need for trained teachers drew Alcorn to begin work with the American Foundation for the Blind (AFB). Founded in 1921, this foundation was greatly supported and publicized throughout the 1920s by Keller and Sullivan. The Tadoma method required extensive training and highly skilled educators. In order to accommodate a greater diversity of teachers, the schools began supplementing the Tadoma method with the manual alphabet and sign language.

That year, in 1953, the American Foundation for the Blind and the Perkins School co-sponsored the first conference on education of the deafblind. Alcorn worked actively with the AFB until her death on November 28, 1967. She was buried at the Buffalo Spring Cemetery in Stanford. Alcorn died only one year before Helen Keller.

== See also ==
- Tadoma
- Helen Keller
- Anne Sullivan
- Kentucky School for the Deaf
