= Clara de Milt =

American chemist (1891–1953)

- Clara de Milt, from a 1926 newspaper
- Born: May 8, 1891; New Orleans, Louisiana, U.S.
- Died: May 10, 1953 (aged 62); New Orleans, Louisiana, U.S.
- Occupations: Chemist, historian of science, college professor

Clara Marie de Milt (May 8, 1891 – May 10, 1953) was an American chemist, historian of science, and college professor. She taught at Newcomb College from 1919 to 1953, and chaired the division of physical sciences at Tulane University.

== Early life and education ==
De Milt was born in New Orleans and raised in Biloxi, Mississippi, the daughter of Daniel de Milt and Carrie Barnard de Milt. She graduated from H. Sophie Newcomb Memorial College in 1911, and earned a master's degree from Tulane University in 1921, and completed her Ph.D. in chemistry at the University of Chicago, with a dissertation titled "Phenylstearic Acid" (1925). She was a member of Phi Beta Kappa. Later, she was director of the Newcomb Alumnae Loan Fund.

== Career ==
De Milt taught high school after college, to help her younger sisters attend college. She returned to Newcomb College as a chemistry instructor in 1919, and became an assistant professor in 1926. She was promoted to full professor status in 1930, and was head of the chemistry department. De Milt was named chair of the chemistry department in Tulane's graduate school in 1941, and in the university's division of physical sciences in 1946.

In 1937 de Milt was elected a fellow of the American Association for the Advancement of Science (AAAS); she was also active in the American Association of University Women (AAUW). In 1946 she was elected vice-chair of the Louisiana section of the American Chemical Society. She was on the editorial board of Chymia, a journal in the history of chemistry.

== Personal life ==
De Milt organized an 8500-mile road trip through Western states with three other women in 1923. She died in 1953, at age 62, at her home in New Orleans. Her papers are at Tulane University.

== Publications ==
=== Scientific ===
- "A Phenylstearic Acid from Oleic Acid" (1927, with Ben H. Nicolet)
- "Diazotization of Weakly Basic and Insoluble Amines: The Use of Pyridine, Quinoline and Isoquinoline as Solvents for the Amines" (1936, with Gertrude van Zandt)
- "The Preparation of 4,4'-Dicyano-diphenyl and Certain Diketones of Diphenyl" (1940, with Mildred Sartor)

=== Historical and pedagogical ===
- A Laboratory Outline of General Chemistry (1933, with Ann Hero Northrup)
- A Laboratory Manual of Preliminary Experiments in Qualitative Analysis (1934)
- A Laboratory Manual of Organic Chemistry (1934)
- A Laboratory Manual of General Chemistry (1939, with Elsie Grueber)
- "Robert Hook, chemist" (1939)
- "Early chemistry at le Jardin du Roi" (1941)
- "Christopher Glaser" (1942)
- "The Origins of our Numeral Notation" (1947)
- "Carl Weltzein and the Congress at Karlsruhe" (1948)
- "The value of the historical approach in the teaching of general chemistry" (1949)
- "The Congress at Karlsruhe" (1951)
- "Auguste Laurent—Guide and inspiration of Gerhardt" (1951)
- "The value of the history and philosophy of science in the training of graduate students in chemistry" (1952)
- "Auguste Laurent, Founder of Modern Organic Chemistry" (1953)
