= Mildred Sartor Compton =

American museum executive (1917–1993)

- Born: July 18, 1917; Bicknell, Indiana, U.S.
- Died: August 8, 1993 (aged 76); Indianapolis, Indiana, U.S.
- Occupations: Chemist, museum executive
- Known for: Executive director, The Children's Museum of Indianapolis (1964–1982)

Mildred Sartor Compton (July 18, 1917 – August 8, 1993) was an American chemist and museum professional. She was executive director of the The Children's Museum of Indianapolis from 1964 to 1982, and first president of the Association of Indiana Museums. She was also president of the American Association of Youth Museums.

== Early life and education ==
Sartor was born in Bicknell, Indiana, the daughter of Noble P. Sartor and Dora P. Mason Sartor. Her father was a bank president. She graduated from Ward-Belmont College in 1936, and the University of Michigan in 1938, and earned a master's degree from Tulane University in 1940.

== Career ==
Compton was an organic chemist at Eli Lilly from 1940 to 1946. She joined the Indianapolis Children's Museum Guild as a cataloging volunteer in 1952, when her children were young. She became the guild's president in 1956, executive secretary of the museum in 1962, and succeeded Grace Blaisdell Golden as executive director of the museum in 1964.

Under Compton's leadership, the Indianapolis Children's Museum built a larger space in 1976, became the largest children's museum in the world, and expanded its programming and fundraising. It became one of the first organizations accredited by the American Alliance of Museums in 1971. She was named Indianapolis Woman of the Year in 1973. In 1975 she received an honorary doctorate from Vincennes University. She retired from the Children's Museum in 1982.

Compton was president of the American Association of Youth Museums, vice president of the American Alliance of Museums, and one of the founders of the Association of Indiana Museums. She was also active in the Midwest Museums Conference (now the Association of Midwest Museums). She was president of the Women's Council of the Indianapolis Chamber of Commerce. In 1971 she participated in the White House Conference on Children and Youth. In 1988 she received a lifetime achievement award from the American Alliance of Museums.

== Publications ==
- "The Preparation of 4,4'-Dicyano-diphenyl and Certain Diketones of Diphenyl" (1940, with Clara de Milt)
- "A Training Program for Museum Volunteers" (1965)

== Personal life ==
Sartor married John Henry Compton in 1944. They had two children. Her husband died in 1961, her son died from cancer in 1974, and she died in 1993, at the age of 76, in Indianapolis.
