= Tennessee Baptist Mission Board =

Protestant Christian organization

The Tennessee Baptist Mission Board (formerly Executive Board of the Tennessee Baptist Convention) is the Tennessee mission board that serves the statewide network of churches that comprise the Tennessee Baptist Convention. It maintains offices in Franklin, Tennessee. Members include 66 Baptist associations and about 3,200 churches.

== Other ministries ==
The convention operates two camp/conference centers. The Linden Valley Baptist Conference Center, commonly called Camp Linden, is located in Linden, Tennessee. The Carson Springs Baptist Conference Center, commonly called Camp Carson, is located in Newport, Tennessee.

The Tennessee Baptist Mission Board publishes a bi-weekly state newspaper called The Baptist & Reflector. It features editorials by Baptist leaders, as well as features about Baptist work around the world. It also features stories about the work of local Tennessee churches.

As with all Southern Baptist state conventions, the Woman's Missionary Union, or WMU, is a part of churches statewide as well as the convention.

The Royal Ambassadors, or RAs, are a part of Southern Baptist churches across Tennessee.

The Tennessee Baptist Mission Board coordinates statewide events such as the annual Youth Evangelism Conference, the annual Missions Get-Together, women's ministry events, the National Day of Prayer, the Tennessee Men's Chorale & Ladies Chorus, Sunday school training events, Bible Drill competitions, numerous missions & ministries, disaster relief, chaplains, as well as numerous children's ministry opportunities.

Affiliated educational institutions include Carson-Newman University, Union University, and Harrison-Chilhowee Baptist Academy. The Tennessee Baptist Convention also supports health systems in the Knoxville and Memphis areas.

== Affiliated organizations ==
- Tennessee Baptist Children's Homes
