= Tadoma =

Deafblind communication

Anne Sullivan demonstrating the use of the method with Helen Keller, 1929

Tadoma is a method of communication utilized by deafblind individuals, in which the listener places their little finger on the speaker's throat picking up the vibrations of the speaker's throat and their middle three fingers along the jawline. It is sometimes referred to as tactile lipreading, as the listener feels the movement of the lips with their thumb, the vibrations of the vocal cords, expansion of the cheeks and the warm air produced by nasal phonemes such as 'N' and 'M'. Hand positioning can vary, and it is a sometimes also used by hard-of-hearing people to supplement their remaining hearing.

In some cases, especially if the speaker knows sign language, the deafblind listener may use the Tadoma method with one hand on the speaker's face, and their other hand on the speaker’s signing hand to hear the words. In this way, the two methods reinforce each other, increasing the chances of the listener understanding the speaker.

The Tadoma method can also help a deafblind person retain speech skills they may have had otherwise. This can, in special cases, allow deafblind people to acquire entirely new words.

It is a difficult method to learn and use, and is rarely used nowadays. However, a small number of deafblind people still use the Tadoma method in everyday communication.

== History ==
The Tadoma method was invented by American teacher Sophie Alcorn and developed at the Perkins School for the Blind in Massachusetts. It is named after the first two children to whom it was taught: Winthrop "Tad" Chapman and Oma Simpson. It was hoped that the students would learn to speak by trying to reproduce what they felt on the speaker's face and throat while touching their own face.

Helen Keller was a famous user of the method.

== See also ==
- Tactile signing
