= Franklin Township, Pennsylvania =

In the U. S. state of Pennsylvania, Franklin Township may refer to:

- Franklin Township, Adams County, Pennsylvania
- Franklin Township, Beaver County, Pennsylvania
- Franklin Township, Bradford County, Pennsylvania
- Franklin Township, Butler County, Pennsylvania
- Franklin Township, Carbon County, Pennsylvania
- Franklin Township, Chester County, Pennsylvania
- Franklin Township, Columbia County, Pennsylvania
- Franklin Township, Erie County, Pennsylvania
- Franklin Township, Fayette County, Pennsylvania
- Franklin Township, Greene County, Pennsylvania
- Franklin Township, Huntingdon County, Pennsylvania
- Franklin Township, Luzerne County, Pennsylvania
- Franklin Township, Lycoming County, Pennsylvania
- Franklin Township, Snyder County, Pennsylvania
- Franklin Township, Susquehanna County, Pennsylvania
- Franklin Township, York County, Pennsylvania

== See also ==
- East Franklin Township, Armstrong County, Pennsylvania
- North Franklin Township, Pennsylvania
- South Franklin Township, Pennsylvania
- West Franklin Township, Pennsylvania
