= Chymia =

- Discipline: History of chemistry
- Language: English, French, German
- Edited by: Tenney L. Davis, Henry M. Leicester

Publication details
- History: 1948–1967 with omission of years 1951, 1952, 1954–1958, & 1963
- Publisher: University of Pennsylvania & History Division, American Chemical Society (United States)
- Frequency: Annual

Standard abbreviations
- ISO 4: Chymia

Indexing
- ISSN: 0095-9367
- LCCN: 48007051
- JSTOR: 00959367
- OCLC no.: 656252805

Links
- Online tables of contents

Chymia was an annual peer-reviewed academic journal published in 12 volumes from 1948 to 1967. In 1947 a committee chaired by Charles Albert Browne Jr. and consisting of four other members, Claude K. Deischer, Rudolf Hirsch, Herbert S. Klickstein, and Henry M. Leicester, established the journal. The first issue was published in 1948 with Tenney L. Davis (1890–1949) as editor-in-chief. Clara de Milt was a consulting editor in the 1940s. Almost all of the articles were in English, but with a few in French or German.

In 1969 Chymia was incorporated into the new journal Historical Studies in the Physical Sciences established by Russell McCormmach.
