= 2026 in Tennessee =

- Decades: 2000s; 2010s; 2020s
- See also: History of Tennessee; Historical outline of Tennessee; List of years in Tennessee; 2026 in the United States

The following is a list of events of the year 2026 in Tennessee.

== Incumbents ==
=== State government ===
- Governor: Bill Lee (R)
- Speaker of the Senate and Lieutenant Governor: Randy McNally (R–Oak Ridge)
- Speaker of the House: Cameron Sexton (R–Crossville)
- Attorney General: Jonathan Skrmetti (R)
- Secretary of State: Tre Hargett (R)
- Treasurer: David Lillard (R)
- Comptroller: Jason Mumpower (R)

=== Federal government ===
- U.S. Senate:
  - Marsha Blackburn (R)
  - Bill Hagerty (R)
- U.S. House of Representatives:
  - Diana Harshbarger (R–1st district)
  - Tim Burchett (R–2nd district)
  - Chuck Fleischmann (R–3rd district)
  - Scott DesJarlais (R–4th district)
  - Andy Ogles (R–5th district)
  - John Rose (R–6th district)
  - Matt Van Epps (R–7th district)
  - David Kustoff (R–8th district)
  - Steve Cohen (D–9th district)

== Events ==
=== January ===
- January 5 – The NCAA Division I Football Championship Game is played at Vanderbilt University's FirstBank Stadium in Nashville. The Montana State Bobcats beat the Illinois State Redbirds 35–34.
- January 22 – Governor Lee declares a statewide state of emergency ahead of "Winter Storm Fern."
- January 25 – About 210,000 customers of Nashville Electric Service (NES) are reported to be without power amid the winter storm.
- January 28 – More than 99,000 NES customers are reported to still be without power.

=== February ===
- February 20 – Vanderbilt University Medical Center notifies patients that the facility will no longer provide gender-affirming surgeries.
- February 13 – The Tennessee State House approves a bill that requires public school districts to display the Ten Commandments.

=== March ===
- March 4 – Nashville Noticias journalist Estefany Rodriguez is detained by Immigration and Customs Enforcement in Nashville.
- March 10 – A bill that would allow women who get abortions to be prosecuted for homicide fails in a Tennessee House subcommittee.
- March 19 – The Tennessee State Senate approves a bill that requires public school districts to display the Ten Commandments.
- March 27 – Two students are killed and seven people are injured in a school bus crash in Carroll County.
- March 30:
  - Vice President JD Vance speaks at the Rockbridge Network spring conference at the Four Seasons Hotel in Nashville.
  - The Rutherford County Library board votes to remove library director Luanne James for refusing to move 132 children's books that the board deemed inappropriate for children into the adult section. James releases a statement saying that she believes her firing was an example of viewpoint discrimination and a violation of the First Amendment.

=== May ===
- May 7 – The Tennessee State House approves a bill that redraws Tennessee's districts in the House of Representatives to remove the one Democratic-leaning district in Memphis.
- May 12 – Tennessee House Speaker Cameron Sexton strips several Democratic state representatives of committee assignments for protesting during the special session on redistricting.
- May 13 – Dalton Eatherly, a streamer who calls himself "Chud the Builder", who is known for streaming racist content, is arrested and indicted for attempted murder, aggravated assault, reckless endangerment and other charges, after allegedly shooting a black man outside a courthouse in Clarksville.
- May 15 – U.S. Representative Steve Cohen (D–9th district) announces that he will not seem reelection after his district was carved up in redistricting.
- May 19 – The National Football League announces Nashville's Nissan Stadium (2027) as the site for Super Bowl LXIV in 2030.
- May 20 – The Perry County Sheriff's Office agrees to a $835,000 settlement with a former police officer who deputies arrested for posting a meme under a Facebook post honoring Charlie Kirk in September 2025.
- May 21 – The execution of Tony Carruthers is called off after executioners fail to find a vein for a backup intravenous line. Governor Lee announces a one-year stay of execution for Carruthers.
- May 22 – A federal judge dismisses charges against Kilmar Abrego Garcia, stating that they were vindictively filed as retaliation for Abrego Garcia filing a lawsuit against his illegal deportation to El Salvador.

=== June ===
- June 3 – Cherokee Removal Memorial Park in Meigs County is dedicated as Cherokee Trail of Tears State Park.
- June 24 – Patricia Head Moskal, chancellor on the Davidson County Chancery Court, issues a temporary restraining order preventing the Tennessee Department of Health from reporting information about disabled and critically ill children to the Tennessee Centralized Immigration Enforcement Division.
- June 28 – The Seamour and Gerte Shavin House in Chattanooga, the house designed by Frank Lloyd Wright in the state, is listed for sale for the first time with a $1.6 million pricetag.

=== July ===
- July 1 – The bill allowing schools to display the Ten Commandments comes into force.
- July 5 – National Guardsmen assigned to the Memphis Safe Task Force (MSTF) fatally shoot an man armed man from behind during a foot pursuit.
- July 8 – A DEA agent with the MSTF fatally shoots a suspect at a hotel.
- July 23 – Metropolitan Nashville Police lieutenant Mike Hotz saves 44-year old Gary Butler from jumping off the Victory Memorial Bridge.

=== August ===
- August 19 – Two member of the Milligan University cycling team are killed in a crash involving a vehicle in Carter County.
- August 22 – Blount County School District, Rutherford County Schools, Washington County Schools, White County Schools, Wilson County Schools Approve the display the Ten Commandments in schools.

=== September ===
- September 5 – A 5K run, called the "9to5K Run & Walk", is held in Nashville to honor Dolly Parton, who died on August 25.
- September 11 – The Metropolitan Nashville Airport Authority votes to rename the Nashville International Airport after Dolly Parton.
- September 28 – Three people, including two children, are killed in a house fire in Waynesboro.
- September 30 – A court halts the planned execution of Christa Pike, who murdered a classmate in 1995 at age 18. However, the Supreme Court of the United States overturns the ruling and allows the execution to take place. However, Pike survives two lethal injections. If carried out, Pike would have been the first woman executed in Tennessee in over 200 years. Governor Lee halts all executions as a result of Pike's survival.

=== October ===
- October 8 – A security officer fatally shoots a man armed with a gun and a knife at a federal courthouse in Nashville.
- October 11 – A Memphis Police officer driving to a call T-bones a vehicle that ran a red light, killing five people.
- October 25 – Convicted murderer Jacob Morley escapes from the Northwest Correctional Complex in Tiptonville.

=== November ===
- November 3 – 2026 Tennessee elections:
  - 2026 Tennessee House of Representatives election
  - 2026 Tennessee gubernatorial election: Senator Marsha Blackburn wins the election.
  - 2026 Tennessee Senate election
  - 2026 United States House of Representatives elections in Tennessee
  - 2026 United States Senate election in Tennessee: Bill Hagerty wins reelection.
  - 2026 Tennessee county mayoral elections

== Deaths ==
- August 25: Dolly Parton, 80, musician, actress, philanthropist, and businesswoman.

== See also ==
- 2026 in the United States
