= 2025 in Tennessee =

- Decades: 2000s; 2010s; 2020s
- See also: History of Tennessee; Historical outline of Tennessee; List of years in Tennessee; 2025 in the United States

The following is a list of events of the year 2025 in Tennessee.

== Incumbents ==
=== State government ===
- Governor: Bill Lee (R)

== Events ==
=== January ===
- January 22 – Antioch High School shooting: A 17-year-old student at Antioch High School shoots at students in the cafeteria, killing one, before killing himself.

=== February ===
- February 14 – Tennessee is impacted by the February 2025 North American storm complex.

=== March ===
- March 21 – 2025 Southwest United States measles outbreak: The Tennessee Department of Health confirms the first measles case of 2025 in the state.

=== June ===
- June 8 – A skydiving plane carrying twenty people crashes shortly after take-off from the Tullahoma Regional Airport. Four passengers are transported to hospitals, and there are no fatalities.
- June 9 – Representative Mark Green (R) announces he will be retiring from congress to take a job in the private sector.
- June 15 – A man scales a subdivision fence and rings the doorbell of Memphis Mayor Paul Young. The man is arrested three days later and charged with attempted kidnapping.
- June 18 – In United States v. Skrmetti, the Supreme Court rules that Tennessee can ban gender-affirming care for minors.

=== July ===
- July 29 – Four family members are found dead in a Tiptonville home, with the infant son of two of the victims found alive. A relative of the victims, Austin Drummond, has been arrested as of August 5, 2025.

=== August ===
- August 5 – Byron Lewis Black is executed by lethal injection at the Riverbend Maximum Security Institution for the murders of his girlfriend and her two daughters in 1988. Authorities refuse to deactivate Black's implanted defibrillator prior to his execution despite concerns it would administer unnecessary shocks.
- August 12 – Four people are killed by floods in Hamilton County, including a family of three who are killed by a falling tree in East Ridge.
- August 21 – A man accused of organizing the 2021 murder of Memphis-based rapper Young Dolph is found not guilty of first-degree murder.
- August 22 – Kilmar Abrego Garcia, a Salvadoran national who was wrongfully deported in March, is released from a Putnam County jail so he can serve home detention in Maryland. He is facing human smuggling charges.
- August 29 – Authorities announce that late McNairy County Sheriff Buford Pusser, whose wife Pauline's 1967 murder inspired the 1973 movie Walking Tall, was likely the one who killed his wife and staged the scene to make it appear they were ambushed.

=== September ===
- September 15 – Trump signs an executive order sending the National Guard and federal law enforcement agencies to Memphis.
- September 21 – The Perry County Sheriff's Office arrests a former law enforcement officer for posting a meme under a Facebook post honoring Charlie Kirk, who was assassinated on September 10. The meme consisted of a quote said by then-former President Donald Trump shortly after the 2024 Perry High School shooting in Iowa, which the local sheriff said constituted a threat to a local high school with a similar name.

=== October ===
- October 1 – Nashville SC beats Austin FC to win the 2025 U.S. Open Cup.
- October 10
  - A large explosion occurs at the Accurate Energetic Systems military explosives plant near Bucksnort, killing 16 people.
  - National Guardsmen begin patrolling in Downtown Memphis and other parts of the city.
- October 27 – An employee at a plastics plant in Cleveland kills two supervisors in a workplace shooting. Police locate the gunman at his home, where he commits suicide.

=== November ===
- November 16 – One Knoxville SC wins the 2025 USL League One Championship, defeating Spokane Velocity.

=== December ===
- December 2 – 2025 Tennessee's 7th congressional district special election: Republican Matt Van Epps defeats Democrat Aftyn Behn to win election to the 7th congressional district.

== See also ==
- 2025 in the United States
