= 2027 in Tennessee =

- Decades: 2000s; 2010s; 2020s
- See also: History of Tennessee; Historical outline of Tennessee; List of years in Tennessee; 2027 in the United States

The following is a list of events of the year 2027 in Tennessee.

== Events ==
=== Planned or predicted ===
- January 2 - 2027 Liberty Bowl
- February - Nissan Stadium (2027) is expected to open
