= Tennessean =

Tennessean refers to someone or something of, from, or related to the state of Tennessee, including:

- The Tennessean newspaper
- Tennessean (train)

== See also ==
- Demographics of Tennessee
- List of people from Tennessee
- Tennessine, named after the state of Tennessee, a similar sounding name for the chemical element number 117
