= 2023 in Tennessee =

- Decades: 2000s; 2010s; 2020s
- See also: History of Tennessee; Historical outline of Tennessee; List of years in Tennessee; 2023 in the United States

The following is a list of events of the year 2023 in Tennessee.

== Incumbents ==
=== State government ===
- Governor: Bill Lee (R)

== Events ==
- January 27 – Tyre Nichols protests: Authorities in Memphis release footage of 29-year-old Tyre Nichols being violently assaulted by multiple Memphis Police Department officers during a traffic stop on January 7.
- March 27 – 2023 Covenant School shooting: Six people are killed in a mass shooting at the Covenant School in Nashville. The suspect is later killed by responding police officers.
- April 6 – 2023 Tennessee House of Representatives expulsions: Two Democratic lawmakers are expelled from the Tennessee House of Representatives for participating in pro-gun control protests following the Covenant School shooting.
- December 9 – A series of tornadoes hits Tennessee, killing six people.

== See also ==
- 2023 in the United States
