= 2024 in Tennessee =

- Decades: 2000s; 2010s; 2020s
- See also: History of Tennessee; Historical outline of Tennessee; List of years in Tennessee; 2024 in the United States

The following is a list of events of the year 2024 in Tennessee.

== Incumbents ==
=== State government ===
- Governor: Bill Lee (R)

== Events ==
- January 21 – The death toll from the ongoing winter storms in the United States increases to 89, with most of the deaths reported in Oregon and Tennessee.
- March 5 –
  - Five people, with 3 children including pilot killed in a plane crash on Interstate 40 near Nashville.
  - Super Tuesday:
    - The Democratic Party holds presidential nominating contests in Tennessee, amongst other states.
    - The Republican Party holds presidential nominating contests in Tennessee, amongst other states.
- April 20 – Two people are killed and six more are injured in a shooting at a block party in Memphis.
- September 27 – Hurricane Helene: The Walters Dam was reported to have suffered a catastrophic failure due to ongoing heavy rainfall, with Cocke County Mayor Rob Mathis ordering the immediate evacuation of parts of the nearby city of Newport.The reports were later confirmed to have been false.
- October 2 – The Tennessee Bureau of Investigation announces an investigation into a plastic factory after six workers have died or went missing from flooding by Hurricane Helene.
- November 5 –
  - 2024 United States presidential election in Tennessee
  - 2024 Tennessee House of Representatives election

== See also ==
- 2024 in the United States
