= 2025 Tennessee manufacturing plant explosion =

Explosion in the United States

- Date: October 10, 2025
- Time: 7:48 a.m. CDT
- Location: Humphreys County, near Bucksnort, Tennessee, United States; 35°55′14″N 87°39′29″W
- Deaths: 16
- Injuries: 7
- Litigation: Wrongful death claim against AAC Investments LLC

On October 10, 2025, a series of explosions occurred at an Accurate Energetic Systems manufacturing facility in Humphreys County, Tennessee, killing sixteen people and injuring seven, one seriously. The facility, located near Bucksnort, was used to manufacture, store, and research high explosives for the Department of Defense and various other customers.

== Background ==
Accurate Energetic Systems (AES) was established in 1980. It is based in McEwen, Tennessee, and conducts research on and manufactures explosives, including demolition charges and high explosives. Their customers include aerospace, oil, and commercial demolition companies. The company had contracts with the Department of Defense for the manufacture of explosives. As recently as September 23, 2025, the department signed a $120 million contract with AES for "the procurement of TNT".

The president of the company is John Sonday. AES employed approximately 75 people prior to the explosion. AES held certifications as a Women-Owned Small Business by the Small Business Administration, and as a Women's Business Enterprise (WBE) by the Women's Business Enterprise National Council (WBENC).

In the surrounding community, the blast brought back memories of the lethal 1978 explosion of a tank car in nearby Waverly. The AES facility was located in Humphreys County, Tennessee, near the border with Hickman County, Tennessee. The plant took up 1,300 acres (530 ha) of land near Bucksnort spring. Across eight buildings of the facility, explosives were manufactured, stored, researched, and tested. The explosives manufactured included C-4 and TNT.

=== Safety record ===
After the explosion, the mayor of Hickman County claimed that the facility had no safety issues of record. However, there had been an explosion at the facility a decade earlier. On April 16, 2014, a Rio Ammunition employee was installing a blast shield between gunpowder hoppers when they exploded. Maxam Explosives owned Rio Ammunition, which leased the building on the AES site. It was one of several companies operating at the site. The explosion killed the employee installing the blast shield and injured three more. Two of the walls and a large portion of the AES facility's roof were destroyed.

The Occupational Safety and Health Administration partially inspected the McEwen plant in 2019. They found employees had not been given proper protective equipment. AES also failed to ensure that surfaces within the facility's break room were kept free of cyclonite. Exposure to the chemical was a potential cause of two employees experiencing seizures.

== Explosion ==
On October 10, 2025, at 7:48 a.m. Central Daylight Time, a large explosion destroyed a building at the Accurate Energetic Systems campus. The plume of smoke from the explosion was so large that the WSMV-TV First Alert Weather radar detected it. Helicopter video showed damaged vehicles and charred debris. Doorbell footage up to 20 mi (32 km) from the facility captured the sound of the explosion and the shaking of the camera. The Bureau of Alcohol, Tobacco, Firearms and Explosives (ATF), the Department of Homeland Security, the Tennessee Bureau of Investigation and the Federal Bureau of Investigation (FBI) were among the agencies that responded to the explosion. Emergency responders were initially unable to reach the site due to continuing explosions. Sixteen people inside the building were killed in the explosion. Seven other employees working around the complex were injured.

== Investigation ==
The sheriff of Humphreys County said during a press briefing on the day of the explosion that they had "a very big investigation" to conduct, noting it could take months to rule out foul play. Investigators from the Bureau of Alcohol, Tobacco, Firearms and Explosives (ATF) joined the effort to determine the cause of the explosion. Additional investigators from the Chemical Safety and Hazard Investigation Board (CSB) joined in efforts to root cause and analysis.

By October 25, the ATF determined the explosion was a chain reaction that began on the ground floor. The facility was making cast boosters for commercial mining. The explosive mixture usually includes TNT, RDX or cyclonite. The process is extremely dangerous as particles that are sensitive to heat, friction, and electrostatic discharge can become airborne.

The components were mixed in kettles on the mezzanine level of the AES building. The mixture was pumped to heating kettles on the main floor. It would then be packed by hand into cardboard tubes and left to cool. The main floor also contained a loading dock where other explosives were stored awaiting shipment. The ATF found the explosion occurred in the heating kettles on the main floor and detonated additional explosive products on the main floor of the AES building. More than 24,000 pounds of explosives detonated. In 2026, a seismological study conducted by researchers from Los Alamos National Laboratory reported an explosive yield of 11.8 tons of TNT equivalent, consistent with ATF inventory reports of 11-13 tons.

== Aftermath ==
Following the explosion, Accurate Energetic Systems paused operations. AES partnered with the Community Foundation of Middle Tennessee to create a fund to support people affected by the disaster. A lawsuit was filed on behalf of the 9-year-old daughter of one of the deceased employees. The lawsuit alleges that AES' parent company, AAC Investments LLC, owned and operated the factory. It further alleges that AAC did not maintain the factory properly.

In April 2026, the Tennessee Occupational Safety and Health Administration (TOSHA) concluded the largest investigation in its history and assessed AES the highest penalties in the state's history. TOSHA found 59 willful violations, 32 serious violations, and 4 repeated serious violations. AES was penalized $3,133,900. TOSHA reported that AES intentionally disregarded industry standards and found, "AES demonstrated plain indifference to employee safety by failing to limit personnel present, duration of employee exposure, and amount of explosive material present during operations in Building 602 that exposed employees to known explosion, fire, and blast hazards".
