= Demographics of Tennessee =

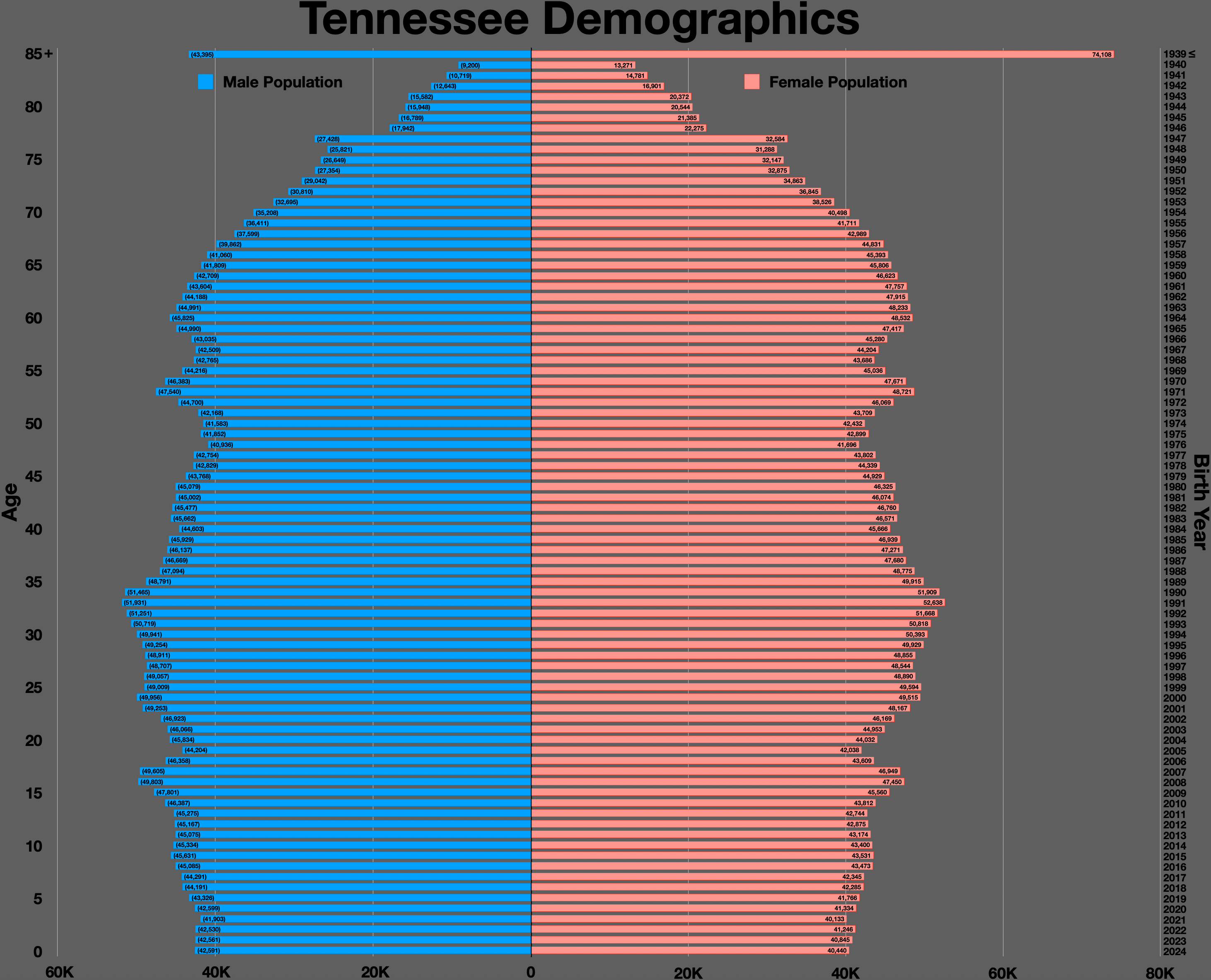
Tennessee population pyramid

Tennessee is the fifteenth most populous state in the United States with a population of 7,051,339 as of 2022, and has the twentieth-highest population density. The 2020 United States census reported its population to be 6,916,897.

== Population ==
Historical population
Census	Pop.	Note	%±
1790	35,691		—
1800	105,602		195.9%
1810	261,727		147.8%
1820	422,823		61.6%
1830	681,904		61.3%
1840	829,210		21.6%
1850	1,002,717		20.9%
1860	1,109,801		10.7%
1870	1,258,520		13.4%
1880	1,542,359		22.6%
1890	1,767,518		14.6%
1900	2,020,616		14.3%
1910	2,184,789		8.1%
1920	2,337,885		7.0%
1930	2,616,556		11.9%
1940	2,915,841		11.4%
1950	3,291,718		12.9%
1960	3,567,089		8.4%
1970	3,923,687		10.0%
1980	4,591,120		17.0%
1990	4,877,185		6.2%
2000	5,689,283		16.7%
2010	6,346,105		11.5%
2020	6,910,840		8.9%
2025 (est.)	7,315,076		5.8%
Source: 1910–2020; 2025

The 2020 United States census reported Tennessee's population at 6,910,840, an increase of 564,735 since the 2010 United States census, or 8.90%. Between 2010 and 2019, the state received a natural increase of 124,385 (584,236 births minus 459,851 deaths), and an increase from net migration of 244,537 people into the state. Immigration from outside the U.S. resulted in a net increase of 66,412, and migration within the country produced a net increase of 178,125.

According to the 2010 census, 6.4% of Tennessee's population were under age 5, 23.6% under 18, and 13.4% 65 or older. In recent years, Tennessee has been a top source of domestic migration, receiving an influx of people relocating from California, Illinois, New York, New Jersey, and New England due to the low cost of living, booming healthcare and automotive industries, and politically conservative governance and culture. Metropolitan Nashville is one of the fastest-growing areas in the country due in part to these factors. In 2010, about 4.4% of Tennessee's population was foreign-born, an increase of about 118.5% since 2000. Of the foreign-born population, approximately 31.0% were naturalized citizens and 69.0% non-citizens. The foreign-born population consisted of approximately 49.9% from Latin America, 27.1% from Asia, 11.9% from Europe, 7.7% from Africa, 2.7% from Northern America, and 0.6% from Oceania.

Tennessee's center of population is in Murfreesboro in Rutherford County.

== Race and ethnicity ==
Racial composition	1940	1970	1990	2000	2010	2019 est.
White	82.5%	83.9%	83.0%	80.2%	77.6%	77.6%
Black	17.4%	15.8%	16.0%	16.4%	16.7%	16.8%
Asian	-	0.1%	0.7%	1.0%	1.4%	1.8%
Native	-	0.1%	0.2%	0.3%	0.3%	0.3%
Native Hawaiian and other Pacific Islander	-	-	–	–	0.1%	0.1%
Other race	-	-	0.2%	1.0%	2.2%	1.4%
Two or more races	-	-	–	1.1%	1.7%	2.2%

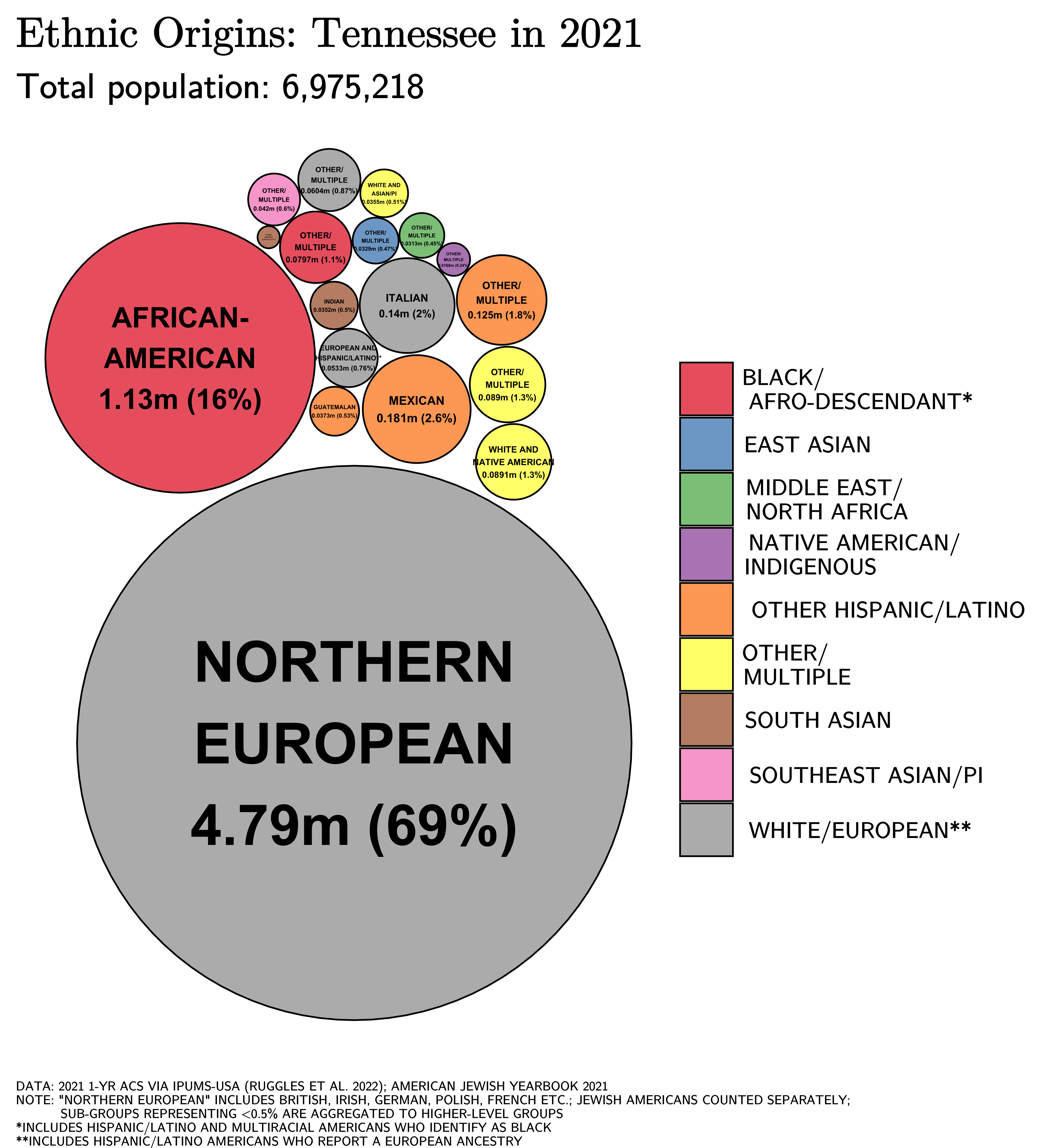
Ethnic origins in Tennessee

In 2010, 4.6% of the total population was of Hispanic or Latino origin (they may be of any race), up from 2.2% in 2000. Between 2000 and 2010, the Hispanic population in Tennessee grew by 134.2%, the third-highest rate of any state. That same year Non-Hispanic whites were 75.6% of the population, compared to 63.7% of the population nationwide.

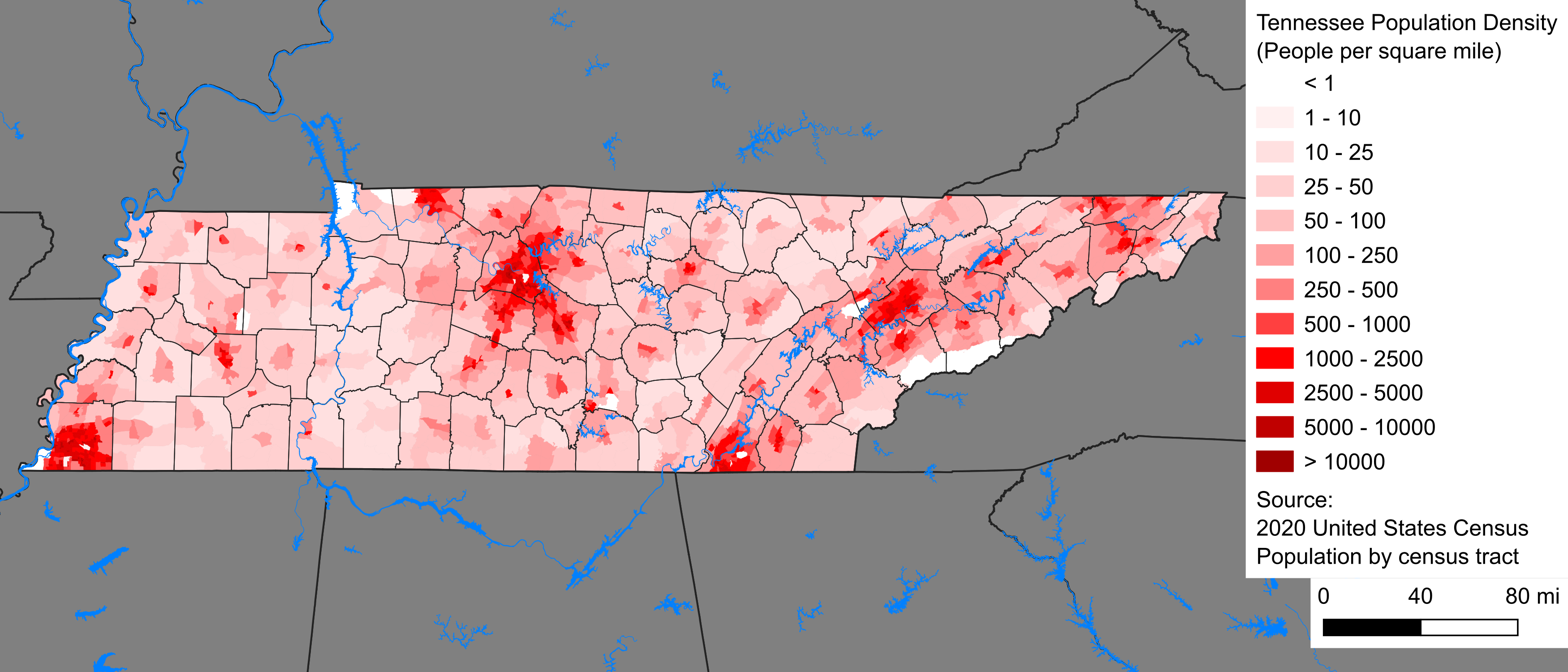
Population density as of 2020

In 2010, the five most common self-reported ethnic groups in the state were: American (26.5%), English (8.2%), Irish (6.6%), German (5.5%), and Scotch-Irish (2.7%). Most Tennesseans who self-identify as having American ancestry are of English and Scotch-Irish ancestry. An estimated 21–24% of Tennesseans are of predominantly English ancestry. In the 1980 census 1,435,147 Tennesseans claimed "English" or "mostly English" ancestry out of a state population of 3,221,354 making them 45% of the state at the time.

On June 19, 2010, the Tennessee Commission of Indian Affairs granted state recognition to six Native American tribes, which was later repealed by the state's Attorney General because the action by the commission was illegal. The tribes were as follows:

- The Cherokee Wolf Clan in western Tennessee, with members in Carroll County, Benton, Decatur, Henderson, Henry, Weakley, Gibson and Madison counties.
- The Chikamaka Band, based historically on the South Cumberland Plateau, said to have members in Franklin, Grundy, Marion, Sequatchie, Warren and Coffee counties.
- Central Band of Cherokee, also known as the Cherokee of Lawrence County.
- United Eastern Lenape Nation of Winfield.
- The Tanasi Council, said to have members in Shelby, Dyer, Gibson, Humphreys and Perry counties; and
- Remnant Yuchi Nation, with members in Sullivan, Carter, Greene, Hawkins, Unicoi, Johnson and Washington counties.

Most immigrants in Tennessee were born in Mexico. Springfield and Shelbyville have a significant Mexican population in the state.

== Vital statistics ==
Year	Population	Live births	Deaths	Natural change	Crude birth rate (per 1,000)	Crude death rate (per 1,000)	Natural change (per 1,000)	Crude migration change (per 1,000)
2000	5,703,719	79,611	55,246	24,365	14.0	9.7	4.3	
2001	5,750,789	78,340	55,151	23,189	13.6	9.6	4.0	4.2
2002	5,795,918	77,482	56,606	20,876	13.4	9.8	3.6	4.2
2003	5,847,812	78,890	57,313	21,577	13.5	9.8	3.7	5.2
2004	5,910,809	79,642	55,829	23,813	13.5	9.4	4.1	6.6
2005	5,991,057	81,747	57,260	24,487	13.6	9.6	4.0	9.3
2006	6,088,766	84,355	56,838	27,517	13.9	9.3	4.6	11.5
2007	6,175,727	86,711	57,087	29,624	14.0	9.2	4.8	9.3
2008	6,247,411	85,560	58,820	26,740	13.7	9.4	4.3	7.2
2009	6,306,019	82,211	58,288	23,923	13.0	9.2	3.8	5.5
2010	6,356,388	79,495	59,578	19,917	12.5	9.4	3.1	4.8
2011	6,404,657	79,588	60,541	19,047	12.4	9.5	2.9	4.6
2012	6,463,610	80,371	61,956	18,415	12.4	9.6	2.8	6.3
2013	6,508,290	79,992	63,406	16,586	12.3	9.7	2.6	4.3
2014	6,559,452	81,602	64,661	16,941	12.4	9.9	2.5	5.2
2015	6,613,679	81,685	66,570	15,115	12.4	10.1	2.3	5.9
2016	6,673,101	80,807	67,857	12,950	12.1	10.2	1.9	7.0
2017	6,740,060	81,016	70,096	10,920	12.0	10.4	1.6	8.3
2018	6,806,981	80,751	71,078	9,673	11.9	10.4	1.5	8.4
2019	6,862,615	80,450	71,935	8,515	11.7	10.5	1.2	6.9
2020	6,927,736	78,689	84,205	-5,516	11.4	12.2	-0.8	10.2
2021	6,966,687	81,717	91,130	-9,413	11.7	13.1	-1.4	6.9
2022	7,063,325	82,265	84,989	-2,724	11.6	12.0	-0.4	14.1
2023	7,153,029	83,021	79,601	3,420	11.6	11.1	0.5	12.1
2024	7,251,291	83,833	79,360	4,473	11.6	10.9	0.7	12.9
2025	7,315,076	84,176	80,171	4,005	11.5	11.0	0.5	8.2

Live births by single race/ethnicity of mother
Race	2014	2015	2016	2017	2018	2019	2020	2021	2022	2023	2024
White	55,499 (68.0%)	55,420 (67.8%)	53,866 (66.7%)	53,721 (66.3%)	53,256 (66.0%)	52,187 (64.9%)	50,668 (64.4%)	53,340 (65.3%)	52,818 (64.2%)	52,962 (63.8%)	53,217 (63.5%)
Black	17,791 (21.8%)	17,507 (21.4%)	15,889 (19.7%)	16,050 (19.8%)	15,921 (19.7%)	15,972 (19.9%)	15,413 (19.6%)	15,204 (18.6%)	14,514 (17.6%)	14,377 (17.3%)	13,004 (15.5%)
Asian	2,180 (2.7%)	2,153 (2.6%)	1,875 (2.3%)	1,905 (2.4%)	1,877 (2.3%)	1,811 (2.3%)	1,767 (2.2%)	1,760 (2.1%)	1,877 (2.3%)	1,804 (2.2%)	2,070 (2.4%)
American Indian	240 (0.3%)	211 (0.2%)	77 (0.1%)	150 (0.2%)	148 (0.2%)	161 (0.2%)	85 (0.1%)	65 (>0.1%)	87 (0.1%)	107 (0.1%)	101 (0.1%)
Hispanic (any race)	6,986 (8.6%)	7,264 (8.9%)	7,631 (9.4%)	7,684 (9.5%)	7,824 (9.7%)	8,437 (10.5%)	8,928 (11.3%)	9,451 (11.6%)	11,048 (13.4%)	11,895 (14.3%)	13,501 (16.1%)
Total	81,602 (100%)	81,685 (100%)	80,807 (100%)	81,016 (100%)	80,751 (100%)	80,450 (100%)	78,689 (100%)	81,717 (100%)	82,265 (100%)	83,021 (100%)	83,833 (100%)

Notes

- Births in table do not add up, because Hispanics are counted both by their ethnicity and by their race, giving a higher overall number.
- Since 2016, data for births of White Hispanic origin are not collected, but included in one Hispanic group; persons of Hispanic origin may be of any race.

== Religion ==
Religious affiliation (2014)
Evangelical Protestantism	52%
Unaffiliated	14%
Mainline Protestantism	13%
Historically Black Protestantism	8%
Catholic	8%
Other Christianity	3%
Other faiths	3%
Judaism	1%
Islam	1%

Tennessee has always been, and remains, predominantly Christian. About 81% of the population identifies as Christian, with Protestants making up 73% of the population. Of the Protestants in the state, Evangelical Protestants compose 52% of the population, Mainline Protestants 13%, and Historically Black Protestants 8%. Roman Catholics make up 8%, Latter-day Saints 1%, and Orthodox Christians less than 1%. The largest churches by number of adherents are the Southern Baptist Convention, the United Methodist Church, the Roman Catholic Church, and the Churches of Christ. Muslims and Jews each make up about 1% of the population, and adherents of other religions make up about 3% of the population. About 14% of Tennesseans are non-religious, with 11% identifying as "Nothing in particular", 3% as agnostics, and 1% as atheists.

Tennessee is included in most definitions of the Bible Belt, and is ranked as one of the nation's most religious states. It is home to several Protestant denominations, including the National Baptist Convention (headquartered in Nashville); the Church of God in Christ and the Cumberland Presbyterian Church (both headquartered in Memphis); and the Church of God and The Church of God of Prophecy (both headquartered in Cleveland). The Free Will Baptist denomination is headquartered in Antioch; its main Bible college is in Nashville. The Southern Baptist Convention maintains its general headquarters in Nashville. Nashville has publishing houses of several denominations.
