= Outline of Tennessee =

Overview of and topical guide to Tennessee

The flag of Tennessee

The location of the state of Tennessee in the United States of America

The following outline is provided as an overview of and topical guide to Tennessee:

Tennessee – U.S. state located in the Southeastern United States. Tennessee is the 36th most extensive and the 16th most populous of the 50 United States. Tennessee was admitted to the Union as the 16th state on June 1, 1796. Tennessee was the last state to leave the Union and join the Confederacy at the outbreak of the U.S. Civil War in 1861, and the first state to be readmitted to the Union at the end of the war. In the 20th century, Tennessee transitioned from an agrarian economy to a more diversified economy, aided at times by federal entities such as the Tennessee Valley Authority. Tennessee has played a critical role in the development of many forms of American popular music, including rock and roll, blues, country, and rockabilly.

== General reference ==
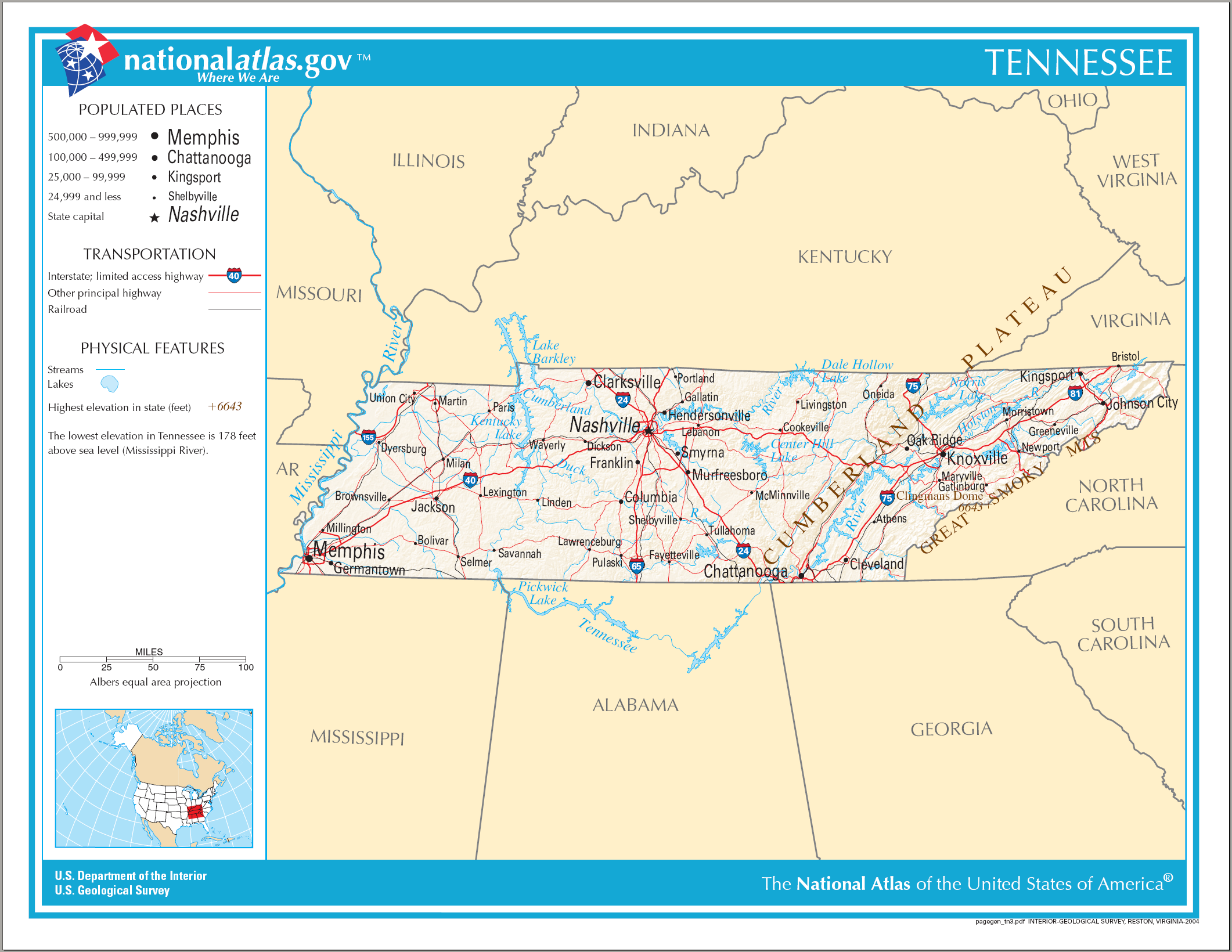
An enlargeable map of the state of Tennessee

- Names
  - Common name: Tennessee
    - Pronunciation: /tɛnɪˈsiː/
  - Official name: State of Tennessee
  - Abbreviations and name codes
    - Postal symbol: TN
    - ISO 3166-2 code: US-TN
    - Internet second-level domain: .tn.us
  - Nicknames
    - Big Bend State (refers to the Tennessee River)
    - Butternut State (refers to the tan color of the uniforms worn by Tennessee soldiers in the American Civil War)
    - Hog and Hominy State
    - The Mother of Southwestern Statesmen
    - Volunteer State (currently used on license plates)
- Adjectival: Tennessee
- Demonyms
  - Tennessean
  - Volunteer

== Geography of Tennessee ==
Geography of Tennessee

- Tennessee is: a U.S. state, a federal state of the United States of America
- Location
  - Northern Hemisphere
  - Western Hemisphere
    - Americas
      - North America
        - Anglo America
        - Northern America
          - United States of America
            - Contiguous United States
              - Central United States
                - East South Central States
              - Southern United States
                - Southeastern United States
- Population of Tennessee: 6,910,840 (2020 United States census)
- Area of Tennessee: 42,181 sq mi (109,247 km^{2})
- Atlas of Tennessee

=== Places in Tennessee ===
- Historic places in Tennessee
  - National Historic Landmarks in Tennessee
  - National Register of Historic Places listings in Tennessee
    - Bridges on the National Register of Historic Places in Tennessee
- National Natural Landmarks in Tennessee
- National parks in Tennessee
- State parks in Tennessee

=== Environment of Tennessee ===
Environment of Tennessee

- Climate of Tennessee
- Geology of Tennessee
- Protected areas in Tennessee
  - State forests of Tennessee
- Superfund sites in Tennessee

==== Natural geographic features of Tennessee ====
- Rivers of Tennessee

=== Regions of Tennessee ===
Grand Divisions of Tennessee

- Western Tennessee
- Middle Tennessee
- Eastern Tennessee

==== Administrative divisions of Tennessee ====
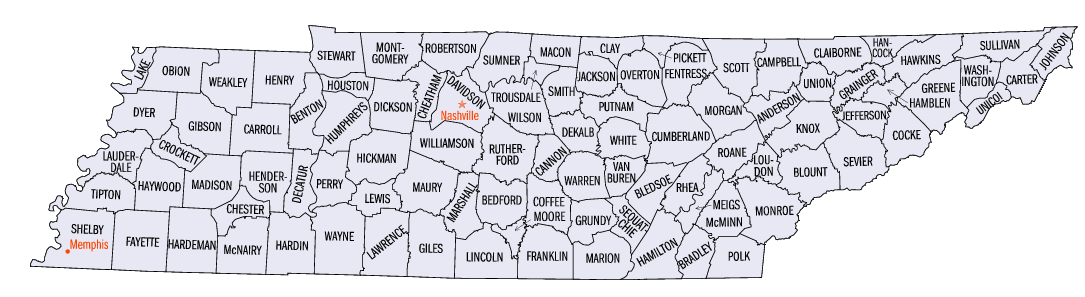
An enlargeable map of the 95 counties of the state of Tennessee

- The 95 counties of the state of Tennessee
  - Municipalities in Tennessee
    - Cities and towns in Tennessee
      - State capital of Tennessee: Nashville
      - City nicknames in Tennessee

=== Demography of Tennessee ===
Demographics of Tennessee

== Government and politics of Tennessee ==
Politics of Tennessee

- Form of government: U.S. state government
- Tennessee's congressional delegations
- Tennessee State Capitol
- Political party strength in Tennessee

=== Branches of the government of Tennessee ===
Government of Tennessee

==== Executive branch of the government of Tennessee ====
- Governor of Tennessee
  - Lieutenant Governor of Tennessee
  - Secretary of State of Tennessee
- State departments
  - Tennessee Department of Agriculture
  - Tennessee Department of Commerce and Insurance
  - Tennessee Department of Correction
  - Tennessee Department of Education
  - Tennessee Department of Environment and Conservation
  - Tennessee Department of Finance and Administration
  - Tennessee Department of Health
  - Tennessee Department of Intellectual and Developmental Disabilities
  - Tennessee Department of Labor and Workforce Development
  - Tennessee Department of Mental Health and Substance Abuse Services
  - Tennessee Department of Personnel
  - Tennessee Department of Revenue
  - Tennessee Department of Safety and Homeland Security
  - Tennessee Department of Tourist Development
  - Tennessee Department of Transportation
  - Tennessee Department of Veterans Affairs
  - Tennessee Military Department

==== Legislative branch of the government of Tennessee ====
- Tennessee General Assembly (bicameral)
  - Upper house: Tennessee Senate
  - Lower house: Tennessee House of Representatives

==== Judicial branch of the government of Tennessee ====
Courts of Tennessee

- Supreme Court of Tennessee

=== Law and order in Tennessee ===
Law of Tennessee

- Cannabis in Tennessee
- Capital punishment in Tennessee
  - Individuals executed in Tennessee
- Constitution of Tennessee
- Crime in Tennessee
- Gun laws in Tennessee
- Law enforcement in Tennessee
  - Law enforcement agencies in Tennessee
    - Tennessee State Police

=== Military in Tennessee ===
- Tennessee Air National Guard
- Tennessee Army National Guard

== History of Tennessee ==
History of Tennessee

=== History of Tennessee, by period ===
- Prehistory of Tennessee
- English Province of Carolina, 1663–1707
- French colony of Louisiane, 1699–1763
- British Province of Carolina, 1707–1712
- British Province of North Carolina, 1712–1776
- French and Indian War, 1754–1763
  - Treaty of Fontainebleau of 1762
  - Treaty of Paris of 1763
- British Indian Reserve, 1763–1783
  - Royal Proclamation of 1763
- American Revolutionary War, April 19, 1775 – September 3, 1783
  - United States Declaration of Independence, July 4, 1776
  - Treaty of Paris, September 3, 1783
- State of North Carolina since 1776
  - Cherokee–American wars, 1776–1794
- Territory South of the River Ohio, 1790–1796
  - Nickajack Expedition, 1794
- State of Tennessee becomes 16th State admitted to the United States of America on June 1, 1796
  - Creek War, 1813–1814
  - Andrew Jackson becomes 7th President of the United States on March 4, 1829
  - James K. Polk becomes 11th President of the United States on March 4, 1845
  - Mexican–American War, April 25, 1846 – February 2, 1848
    - Tennessee volunteers
  - American Civil War, April 12, 1861 – May 13, 1865
    - Tennessee in the American Civil War, 1861–1865
        - Eleventh state to declare secession from the United States on June 8, 1861
        - Eleventh state admitted to the Confederate States of America on July 2, 1861
      - Battle of Fort Donelson, February 11–16, 1862
      - Battle of Shiloh, April 6–7, 1862
      - Stones River Campaign, November 20, 1862 – January 2, 1863
        - Battle of Stones River, December 31, 1862 - January 2, 1863
      - Tullahoma Campaign, June 24 – July 3, 1863
      - Knoxville Campaign, September 22 – December 14, 1863
      - Chattanooga campaign, October 1 – November 27, 1863
        - Battle of Lookout Mountain, November 24, 1863
        - Battle of Missionary Ridge, November 25, 1863
      - Franklin-Nashville Campaign, October 5 – December 25, 1864
        - Second Battle of Franklin, November 30, 1864
        - Battle of Nashville, December 15–16, 1864
  - Andrew Johnson becomes 17th President of the United States on April 15, 1865
  - Tennessee in Reconstruction, 1865–1866
      - First former Confederate state readmitted to the United States on July 24, 1866
  - Great Smoky Mountains National Park established on June 15, 1934
  - Civil Rights Movement from December 1, 1955, to January 20, 1969
    - Assassination of Martin Luther King Jr. in Memphis on April 4, 1968

=== History of Tennessee, by region ===
- History of Nashville
- History of Memphis
- History of Knoxville
- History of Chattanooga
- History of Clarksville
- History of Murfreesboro
- History of Franklin
- History of Jackson
- History of Johnson City
- History of Kingsport

=== History of Tennessee, by subject ===
- History of sports in Tennessee
  - History of the Tennessee Titans

=== History publications on Tennessee ===
- Tennessee Encyclopedia of History and Culture

=== Historical museums and societies in Tennessee ===
- East Tennessee Historical Society

== Culture of Tennessee ==
Culture of Tennessee

- Museums in Tennessee
- Religion in Tennessee
  - The Church of Jesus Christ of Latter-day Saints in Tennessee
  - Episcopal Diocese of Tennessee
- Scouting in Tennessee
- State symbols of Tennessee
  - Flag of the State of Tennessee
  - Great Seal of the State of Tennessee

=== The arts in Tennessee ===
- Music of Tennessee

=== Sports in Tennessee ===
Sports in Tennessee

== Economy and infrastructure of Tennessee ==
Economy of Tennessee

- Communications in Tennessee
  - Newspapers in Tennessee
  - Radio stations in Tennessee
  - Television stations in Tennessee
- Health care in Tennessee
  - Hospitals in Tennessee
- Transportation in Tennessee
  - Airports in Tennessee
  - State routes in Tennessee
  - US and Interstate routes in Tennessee

== Education in Tennessee ==
Education in Tennessee

- Schools in Tennessee
  - School districts in Tennessee
    - High schools in Tennessee
  - Colleges and universities in Tennessee
    - University of Tennessee system
      - University of Tennessee
        - University of Tennessee Agriculture Farm Mound
        - University of Tennessee Anthropological Research Facility
        - University of Tennessee Arboretum
        - University of Tennessee Botanical Gardens
        - University of Tennessee College of Dentistry
        - University of Tennessee College of Law
        - University of Tennessee College of Medicine
        - University of Tennessee Fencing Club
        - University of Tennessee Health Science Center
        - University of Tennessee Medical Center
        - University of Tennessee Police
        - University of Tennessee Press
        - University of Tennessee Space Institute
      - University of Tennessee at Chattanooga
        - University of Tennessee at Chattanooga Marching Mocs
      - University of Tennessee at Martin
        - University of Tennessee at Nashville
    - Tennessee Board of Regents
      - State Universities
        - Austin Peay State University
        - East Tennessee State University
        - Middle Tennessee State University
        - Tennessee State University
        - Tennessee Technological University
        - University of Memphis
      - Community Colleges
        - Chattanooga State Community College
        - Cleveland State Community College
        - Columbia State Community College
        - Dyersburg State Community College
        - Jackson State Community College
        - Motlow State Community College
        - Nashville State Community College
        - Northeast State Community College
        - Pellissippi State Community College
        - Roane State Community College
        - Southwest Tennessee Community College
        - Volunteer State Community College
        - Walters State Community College
      - Tennessee Technology Centers

== See also ==
- Topic overview:
  - Tennessee
  - Index of Tennessee-related articles
