= History of Tennessee =

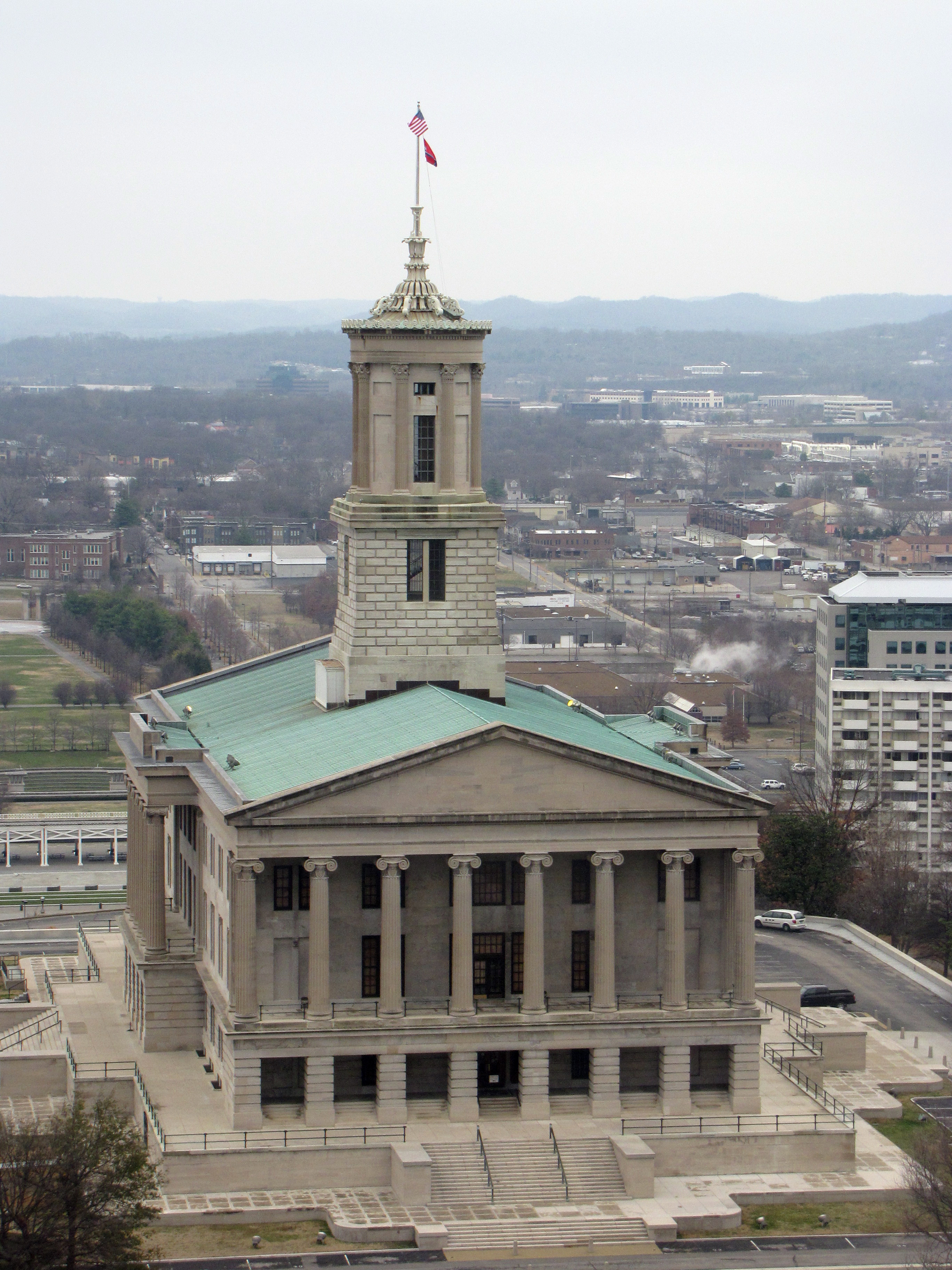
The Tennessee State Capitol in Nashville

Tennessee is one of the 50 states of the United States. What is now Tennessee was initially part of North Carolina, and later part of the Southwest Territory. It was admitted to the Union on June 1, 1796, as the 16th state. Tennessee earned the nickname "The Volunteer State" during the War of 1812, when many Tennesseans helped with the war effort, especially during the American victory at the Battle of New Orleans in 1815. The nickname became even more applicable during the Mexican–American War in 1846, after the Secretary of War asked the state for 2,800 soldiers, and Tennessee sent over 30,000 volunteers.

Tennessee was the last state to formally leave the Union and join the Confederacy at the outbreak of the American Civil War in 1861. With Nashville occupied by Union forces from 1862, it was the first state to be readmitted to the Union during Reconstruction. During the Civil War, Tennessee furnished the second most soldiers for the Confederate Army, behind Virginia. Tennessee supplied more units of soldiers for the Union Army than any other state within the Confederacy, with East Tennessee being mostly a Southern Unionist stronghold. During the Reconstruction era, the state had competitive party politics, but a Democratic takeover in the late 1880s resulted in passage of disenfranchisement laws that excluded most blacks and many poor whites from voting, with the exception of Memphis. This sharply reduced competition in politics in the state until after passage of civil rights legislation in the mid-20th century.

After 1900, Tennessee transitioned from an agrarian economy based on tobacco and cotton, to a more diversified economy. This was aided in part by massive federal investment in the Tennessee Valley Authority created in the 1930s by the New Deal, helping the TVA become the nation's largest public utility provider. The huge electricity supply made possible the establishment of the city of Oak Ridge to house the Manhattan Project's uranium enrichment facilities, helping to build the world's first atomic bombs. In 2016, the element tennessine was named for the state, largely in recognition of the roles played by Oak Ridge, Vanderbilt University, and the University of Tennessee in the element's discovery.

== Prehistory ==
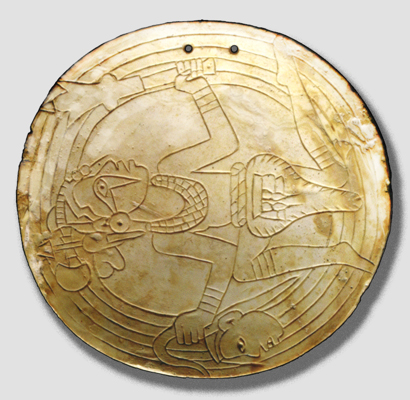
Mississippian-period shell gorget, Castalian Springs, Sumner County

Paleo-Indians are believed to have hunted and camped in what is now Tennessee as early as 12,000 years ago. Along with projectile points common for this period, archaeologists in Williamson County have uncovered a 12,000-year-old mastodon skeleton with cut marks typical of prehistoric hunters.

The most prominent known Archaic period (c. 8000 – 1000 BC) site in Tennessee is the Icehouse Bottom site located just south of Fort Loudoun in Monroe County. Excavations at Icehouse Bottom in the early 1970s uncovered evidence of human habitation dating to as early as 7,500 BC. Other archaic sites include Rose Island, located a few miles downstream from Icehouse Bottom, and the Eva site in Benton County. The Archaic peoples first domesticated dogs and created the first villages in the state, but were largely hunter-gatherers confined to smaller territories than their predecessors.

Tennessee is home to two major Woodland period (1000 BC – 1000 AD) sites: the Pinson Mounds in Madison County and the Old Stone Fort in Coffee County, both built c. 1–500 AD. The Pinson Mounds are the largest Middle Woodland site in the Southeastern United States, consisting of at least 12 mounds and a geometric earthen enclosure. The Old Stone Fort is a large ceremonial structure with a complex entrance way, situated on what was once a relatively inaccessible peninsula.

Mississippian (c. 1000 – 1600) villages are found along the banks of most of the major rivers in Tennessee. The most well-known of these sites include Chucalissa near Memphis; Mound Bottom in Cheatham County; Shiloh Mounds in Hardin County; and the Toqua site in Monroe County. Excavations at the McMahan Mound Site in Sevier County and more recently at Townsend in Blount County have uncovered the remnants of palisaded villages dating to 1200.

== European exploration and settlement ==
=== Early Spanish and French exploration ===
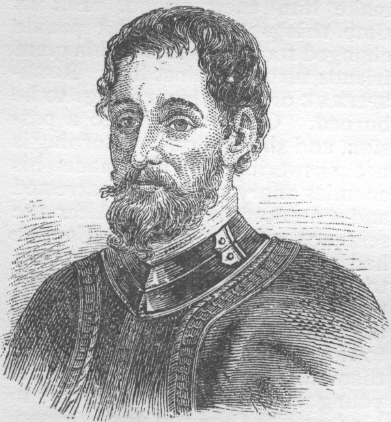
Conquistador Hernando de Soto, first European to visit Tennessee

In the 16th century, three Spanish expeditions passed through what is now Tennessee. The Hernando de Soto expedition entered the Tennessee Valley via the Nolichucky River in June 1540, rested for several weeks at the village of Chiaha (near the modern Douglas Dam), and proceeded southward to the Coosa chiefdom in northern Georgia. De Soto spent the winter of 1540-41 in camp on Pontotoc Ridge in extreme northern Mississippi. He may have entered Tennessee and gone west to the Mississippi at or near present-day Memphis. In 1559, the expedition of Tristán de Luna, which was resting at Coosa, entered the Chattanooga area to help the Coosa chief subdue a rebellious tribe known as the Napochies. In 1567, the Pardo expedition entered the Tennessee Valley via the French Broad River, rested for several days at Chiaha, and followed a trail to the upper Little Tennessee River before being forced to turn back. At Chiaha, one of Pardo's subordinates, Hernando Moyano de Morales, established a short-lived fort called San Pedro. It, along with five other Spanish forts across the region, was destroyed by natives in 1569, thereby opening the area to other European colonization.

Chronicles of the Spanish explorers provide the earliest written accounts regarding the Tennessee Valley's 16th-century inhabitants. Most of the valley, including Chiaha, was part of the Coosa chiefdom's regional sphere of influence. Inhabitants spoke a dialect of the Muskogean language, and lived in complex agrarian communities centered around fortified villages. Cherokee-speaking people lived in the remote reaches of the Appalachian Mountains, and may have been at war with the Muskogean inhabitants in the valley. The village of Tali, visited by De Soto in 1540, is believed to be the Mississippian-period village excavated at the Toqua site in the 1970s. The villages of Chalahume and Satapo, visited by Pardo in 1567, were likely predecessors (and namesakes for) the later Cherokee villages of Chilhowee and Citico, which were located near the modern Chilhowee Dam.

As of the 17th century, Tennessee was the middle ground for several different native peoples. Along the Mississippi River was the Chickasaw & Choctaw peoples, and inland of them were the Coushatta—all three were part of the Muskogean language family. Before European contact, they were supposedly all a loose collection of Mississippian culture city-states with their own leaders, but upon contact with Europeans, they merged into larger nations, spread out and adopted a European lifestyle, earning many of them the title of the "Civilized Tribes." During the height of the Mississippians, hundreds of walled cities extended throughout the American south from Louisiana to the east coast, up the Mississippi into Wisconsin & a few fringe cities along larger rivers on the Great Plains. They had complex society & agriculture. They did not build with stone, but made plenty of examples of sculpture work in clay, stone & copper. Most of what remains of these cities, however, are large, pyramidal, earthen hills (upon which chiefs & upper-classmen would build their homes) and artful burial mounds. These people did not develop the Mississippian culture, however, but adopted it from the Caddo people west of the Mississippi River.

To the east were the Yuchi & Iroquoian Cherokee, divided along the Tennessee River. In the north-central region of the state were the Algonquian Cisca. They later moved northeast and merged with the Shawnee, but were briefly replaced with a second native nation known as the Maumee, or Mascouten which were driven south during the Beaver Wars (1640-1680) from southern Michigan. They later merged with the Miami of Indiana & were, once again, replaced by the Shawnee. The Shawnee controlled most of the Ohio River Region until the Shawnee Wars (1811-1813).

In 1673, English trader Abraham Wood sent an expedition led by James Needham and Gabriel Arthur from Fort Henry in the Colony of Virginia into Overhill Cherokee territory in modern-day northeastern Tennessee. Needham was killed during the expedition, and Arthur was taken prisoner for more than a year. That same year, a French expedition led by missionary Jacques Marquette and trader Louis Jolliet explored the Mississippi River and became the first Europeans to map the Mississippi Valley.

French explorers and traders, led by Robert de La Salle, entered the region in 1682 at Fort Prudhomme. France briefly (1739–1740) established a presence at Fort Assumption during the Chickasaw Wars. In 1714, a group of French traders under Charles Charleville's command established a settlement at the present location of downtown Nashville near the Cumberland River, which became known as French Lick. These settlers quickly established an extensive fur trading network with the local Native Americans, but by the 1740s the settlement had largely been abandoned. In 1739, the French constructed Fort Assumption under Jean-Baptiste Le Moyne de Bienville on the Mississippi River at the present-day location of Memphis, which they used as a base against the Chickasaw during the 1739 Campaign of the Chickasaw Wars. It was abandoned the next year after the Chickasaw took hostage French troops stationed at the fort.

The Cherokee eventually moved south from the area now called Virginia. As European colonists spread into the area, the native populations were forcibly displaced to the south and west, including the Muscogee, Yuchi, Chickasaw and Choctaw peoples. Then, from 1838 to 1839, the US government forced the Cherokee to leave the eastern United States. Nearly 17,000 Cherokee were forced to march from eastern Tennessee to the Indian Territory west of the Arkansas Territory. This came to be known as the Trail of Tears, as an estimated 4,000 Cherokee died along the way. In the Cherokee language, the event is called Nunna daul Isunyi—"The Trail Where We Cried".

=== Early British exploration and settlement ===
In the 1750s and 1760s, longhunters from Virginia explored much of East and Middle Tennessee. In 1756, British soldiers from the Colony of South Carolina built Fort Loudoun near present-day Vonore, the first British settlement in what is now Tennessee. Fort Loudoun was the westernmost British outpost to that date, and was designed by John William Gerard de Brahm and constructed by forces under Captain Raymond Demeré. Shortly after its completion, Demeré relinquished command of the fort to his brother, Captain Paul Demeré. Hostilities erupted between the British and the Overhill Cherokees into an armed conflict that became known as the Anglo-Cherokee War, and a siege of the fort ended with its surrender in 1760. The next morning, Paul Demeré and a number of his troops were killed in an ambush nearby, and most of the rest of the garrison was taken prisoner. After the end of the French and Indian War, Britain issued the Royal Proclamation of 1763, which forbade settlements west of the Appalachian Mountains in an effort to mitigate conflicts with the Natives. Despite this proclamation, migration across the mountains continued, and the first permanent European settlers began arriving in the northeastern part of the state in the late 1760s. William Bean, a longhunter who settled in a log cabin near present-day Johnson City in 1769, is traditionally accepted as the first permanent European American settler in Tennessee. Most 18th-century settlers were English or of primarily English descent, but nearly 20% of them were Scotch-Irish.

=== Watauga Association ===
During 1772, the Watauga Association met with, and leased lands belonging to, the Cherokee at Sycamore Shoals (in the present day area of Elizabethton, Tennessee). In 1775, Sycamore Shoals was the site of the Transylvania purchase, conducted between the Cherokee and North Carolina land baron, Richard Henderson.

The Treaty of Sycamore Shoals, more popularly referred to as the Transylvania Purchase (after Henderson's Transylvania Company, which had raised money for the endeavor), consisted of two parts. The first, known as the "Path Grant Deed", regarded the Transylvania Company's purchase of lands in southwest Virginia (including parts of what is now West Virginia) and northeastern Tennessee. The second part, known as the "Great Grant," acknowledged the Transylvania Company's purchase of some 20,000,000 acres (81,000 km^{2}) of land between the Kentucky River and Cumberland River, which included a large portion of modern Kentucky and a significant portion of Tennessee north of present day Nashville. The Transylvania Company paid for the land with 10,000 pounds sterling of trade goods. After the treaty was signed, frontier explorer Daniel Boone came northward to blaze the Wilderness Road, connecting the Transylvania Purchase lands with the Holston and Watauga settlements.

Both the lease and the sale were considered illegal by the Crown Government, as well as by the warring Cherokee faction known as the Chickamauga, led by the war-chief, Dragging Canoe. The Chickamauga violently contested the westward expansion by European settlers across Tennessee throughout the Cherokee–American wars (1776–1794).

In April 1775, the Watauga Association was reorganized as the "Washington District," allied with the colonies that were declaring independence from Great Britain. The Washington District annexation petition was first rejected by Virginia in the spring of 1776, but a similar annexation petition presented by the district to the North Carolina legislature was approved in November 1776.

=== Government under North Carolina ===
In the days before statehood, Tennesseans struggled to gain a political voice and suffered for lack of the protection afforded by organized government. Six counties—Washington, Sullivan, and Greene in East Tennessee; and Davidson, Sumner, and Tennessee County in Middle Tennessee—had been formed as western counties of North Carolina between 1777 and 1788.

In 1780, the newly formed Cumberland Association, under the Cumberland Compact, established Fort Nashborough on the Cumberland River, opening up a second frontier of settlement within present-day Tennessee. The Cumberland River settlements were separated from those in the east by a substantial enclave of Cherokee territory that was not formally acquired from them until 1805.

After the American Revolutionary War, North Carolina did not want the trouble and expense of maintaining such distant settlements, embroiled as they were with hostile tribesmen during the Cherokee–American wars, and needing roads, forts, and open waterways. Nor could the far-flung settlers look to the national government; for under the weak, loosely constituted Articles of Confederation, it was a government in name only.

In 1775, Richard Henderson negotiated a series of treaties with the Cherokee to sell the lands of the Watauga settlements at Sycamore Shoals on the banks of the Watauga River in present-day Elizabethton. An agreement to sell land for the Transylvania Colony, which included the territory in modern-day Tennessee north of the Cumberland River, was also signed. Later that year, Daniel Boone, under Henderson's employment, blazed a trail from Fort Chiswell in Virginia through the Cumberland Gap, which became part of the Wilderness Road, a major thoroughfare for settlers into Tennessee and Kentucky.

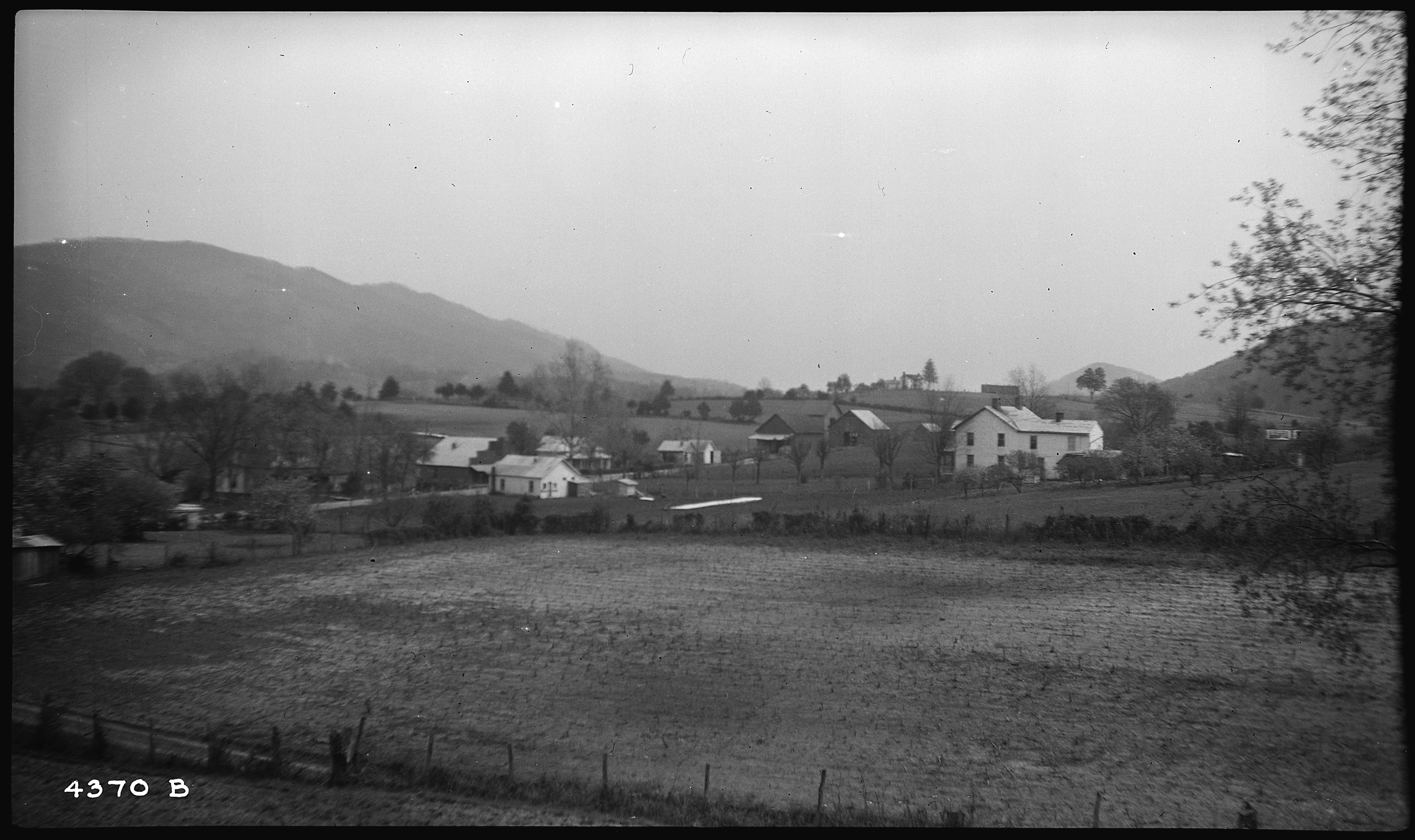
Bean Station in 1938, the first known permanent settlement of Tennessee.

The first permanent settlement in Tennessee, Bean Station, was established in 1776, but was explored by pioneers Daniel Boone and William Bean one year prior on a longhunting excursion. The duo first observed Bean Station after crossing the gap at Clinch Mountain along a southern expansion of the Wilderness Road from the Cumberland Gap, one of the main thoroughfares into Tennessee. After fighting in the American Revolutionary War one year later, Bean was awarded 3,000 acres (12 km^{2}) in the area he previously surveyed for settlement during his excursion with Boone. Bean would later construct a four-room cabin at this site, which served as his family's permanent home, and as an inn for prospective settlers, fur traders, and longhunters, thus establishing the first permanent settlement in Tennessee. The settlement was situated at the intersection of the Wilderness Road, that roughly followed what is present-day U.S. Route 25E, and the Great Indian Warpath, an east–west pathway that roughly followed what is now U.S. Route 11W. This heavily trafficked crossroads location made Bean Station an important stopover between Washington, D.C. and New Orleans for early American travelers entering Tennessee, with taverns and inns operating by the 1800s.

=== State of Franklin ===
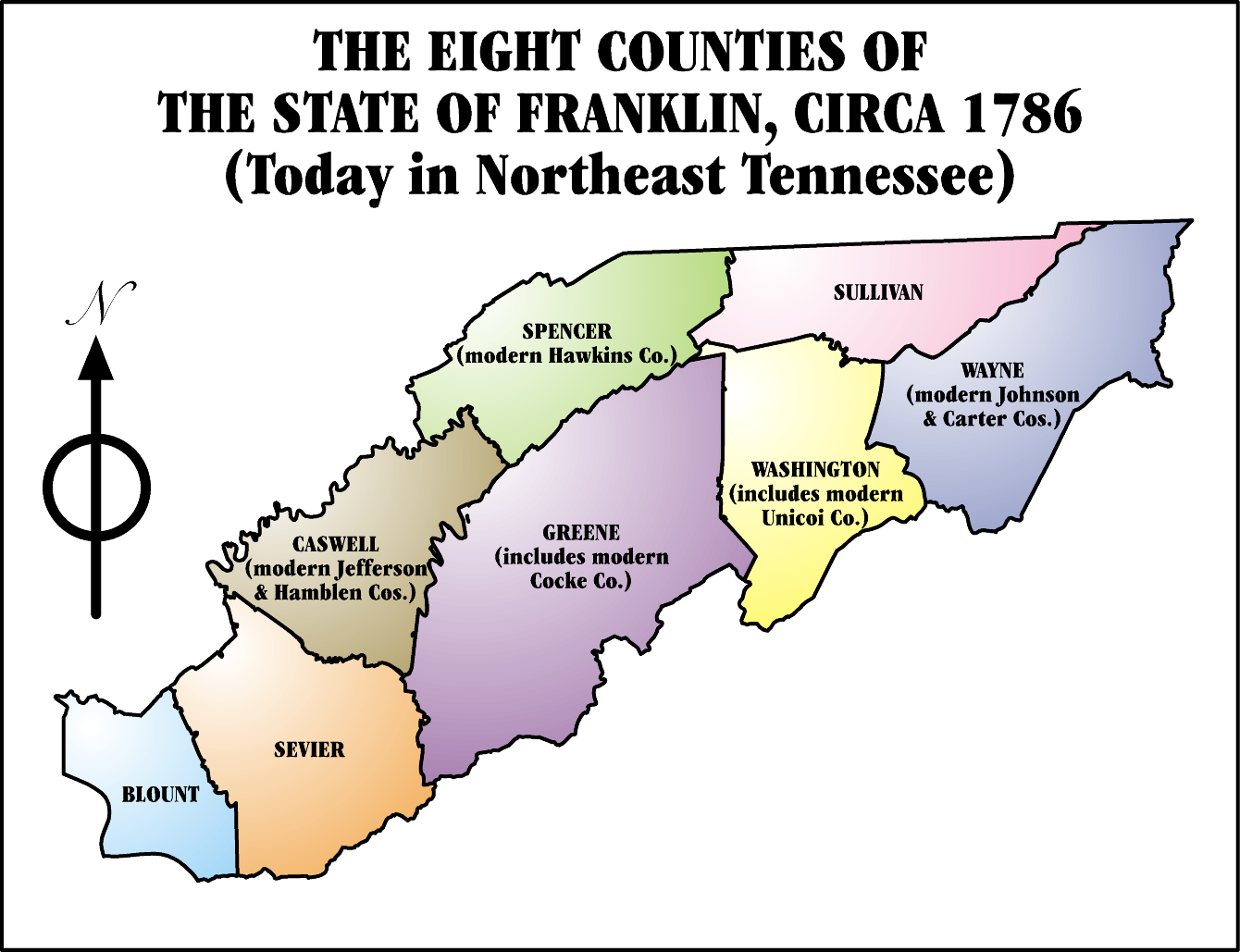

The westerners' two main demands—protection from the Indians and the right to navigate the Mississippi River—went mainly unheeded during the 1780s. North Carolina's insensitivity led frustrated East Tennesseans in 1784 to form the breakaway State of Franklin.

John Sevier was named governor, and the fledgling state began operating as an independent, though unrecognized, government. At the same time, leaders of the Cumberland settlements made overtures for an alliance with Spain, which controlled the lower Mississippi River and was held responsible for inciting the Indian raids. In drawing up the Watauga and Cumberland Compacts, early Tennesseans had already exercised some of the rights of self-government and were showing signs of a willingness to take political matters into their own hands.

Such stirrings of independence caught the attention of North Carolina, which began to reassert control over its western counties. These policies and internal divisions among East Tennesseans doomed the short-lived State of Franklin, which passed out of existence by early 1789.

=== Southwest Territory ===
When North Carolina ratified the Constitution of the United States in 1789, it also ceded its western lands, the "Tennessee country", to the Federal government. North Carolina had used these lands as a means of rewarding its Revolutionary War soldiers. In the Cession Act of 1789, it reserved the right to satisfy further land claims in Tennessee.

Congress designated the area as the "Territory of the United States South of the River Ohio", more commonly known as the Southwest Territory. The territory was divided into three districts—two for East Tennessee and one for the Mero District on the Cumberland—each with its own courts, militia and officeholders. President George Washington appointed William Blount, a prominent North Carolinian politician with extensive holdings in the western lands, territorial governor.

== Admission to the Union ==
In 1795, a territorial census revealed a sufficient population for statehood. A referendum showed a three-to-one majority in favor of joining the Union. Governor Blount called for a constitutional convention to meet in Knoxville, where delegates from all the counties drew up a model state constitution and democratic bill of rights.

The voters chose Sevier as governor. The newly elected legislature voted for Blount and William Cocke as Senators, and Andrew Jackson as Congressman.

Tennessee leaders thereby converted the territory into a new state, with organized government and constitution, before applying to Congress for admission. Since the Southwest Territory was the first Federal territory to present itself for admission to the Union, there was some uncertainty about how to proceed, and Congress was divided on the issue.

Nonetheless, in a close vote on June 1, 1796, Congress approved the admission of Tennessee as the sixteenth state of the Union. They drew its borders by extending the northern and southern borders of North Carolina, with a few deviations, to the Mississippi River, Tennessee's western boundary.

== Jacksonian America (1815–1841) ==
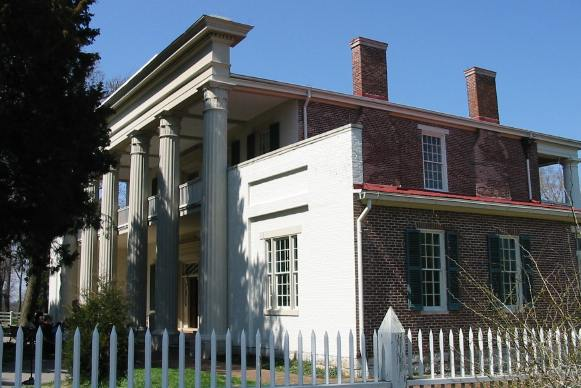
The Hermitage, plantation home of President Andrew Jackson, now a museum in Davidson County

In terms of voting patterns in the closely divided state during the Second Party System, the Whig Party attracted wealthier commercial farmers who lived in places with easy access to markets while the Democratic Party attracted poorer subsistence farmers with less access to markets.

== Black history ==
In the early years of settlement, planters brought African slaves with them from Kentucky and Virginia. These slaves were first concentrated in Middle Tennessee, where planters developed mixed crops and bred high-quality horses and cattle, as they did in the Inner Bluegrass region of Kentucky. East Tennessee had more subsistence farmers and few slaveholders. During the early years of state formation, there was support for emancipation. At the constitutional convention of 1796, "free negroes" were given the right to vote if they met residency and property requirements. Efforts to abolish slavery were defeated at this convention and again at the convention of 1834. The convention of 1834 also marked the state's retraction of suffrage for most freed slaves. By 1830 the number of African Americans had increased from less than 4,000 at the beginning of the century to 146,158. This was chiefly related to the invention of the cotton gin in 1793 and the development of large plantations and transportation of numerous enslaved people to the Cotton Belt in West Tennessee, in the area of the Mississippi River.

== Antebellum years (1841–1861) ==
Tennessee's economy was heavily agricultural, with the state serving as a "breadbasket" to the cotton plantations in the Deep South. Tennessee farmers grew a variety of crops, including corn, wheat, and tobacco, and raised a significant number of hogs, mules, and other livestock. While much commerce still relied on rivers, the period saw a boom in railroad construction. By 1860, over 1,200 miles of railroad track had been laid, primarily in East and Middle Tennessee. This new infrastructure connected different regions of the state and provided a vital link to the rest of the country, particularly to the markets of the Deep South and Virginia. This economic development, however, also deepened the economic differences between the regions of the state.

By 1860 the slave population had nearly doubled to 283,000, with only 7,300 free African Americans in the state. While much of the slave population was concentrated in West Tennessee, planters in Middle Tennessee also used enslaved African Americans for labor. According to the 1860 census, African slaves comprised about 25% of the state's population of 1.1 million before the Civil War. Rich white men increasingly invested their profits in adding more slaves.

== Civil War ==
=== Secession ===
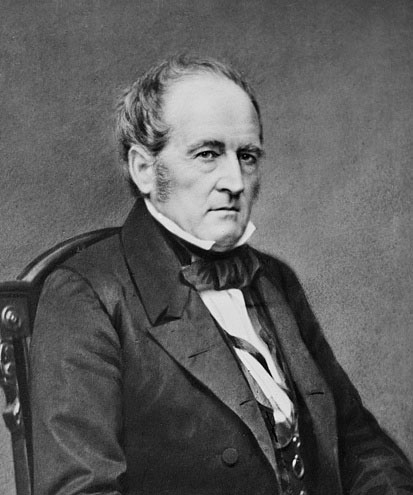
John Bell

Most Tennesseans initially showed little enthusiasm for breaking away from a nation whose struggles it had shared for so long. There were small exceptions such as Franklin County, which borders Alabama in southern Middle Tennessee; Franklin County formally threatened to secede from Tennessee and join Alabama if Tennessee did not leave the Union. Franklin County withdrew this threat when Tennessee did eventually secede. In 1860, Tennesseans had voted by a slim margin for the Constitutional Unionist John Bell, a native son and moderate who continued to search for a way out of the crisis.

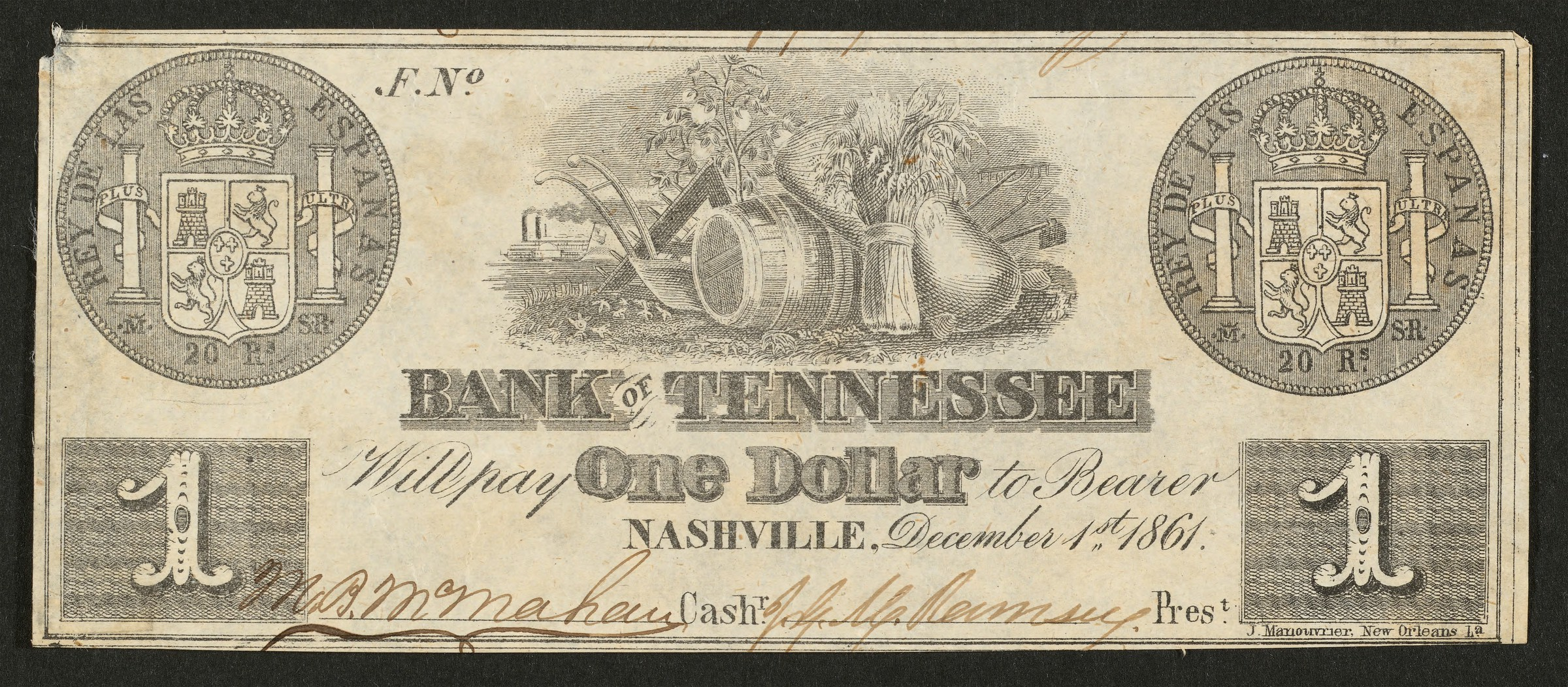
1861 Bank of Tennessee 1 dollar banknote

In February 1861, fifty-four percent of the state's voters voted against sending delegates to a secession convention. With the attack on Fort Sumter in April, however, followed by President Abraham Lincoln's call for 75,000 volunteers to coerce the seceded states back into line, public sentiment turned dramatically against the Union.

Historian Daniel Crofts wrote: "Unionists of all descriptions, both those who became Confederates and those who did not, considered the proclamation calling for seventy-five thousand troops 'disastrous.' Having consulted personally with Lincoln in March, Congressman Horace Maynard, the unconditional Unionist and future Republican from East Tennessee, felt assured that the administration would pursue a peaceful policy. Soon after April 15, a dismayed Maynard reported that 'the President's extraordinary proclamation' had unleashed 'a tornado of excitement that seems likely to sweep us all away.' Men who had 'heretofore been cool, firm and Union loving' had become 'perfectly wild' and were 'aroused to a phrenzy[sic] of passion.' For what purpose, they asked, could such an army be wanted 'but to invade, overrun and subjugate the Southern states.' The growing war spirit in the North further convinced southerners that they would have to 'fight for our hearthstones and the security of home.'

Governor Isham Harris began military mobilization, submitted an ordinance of secession to the General Assembly, and made direct overtures to the Confederate government. In a June 8, 1861, referendum, East Tennessee held firm against separation, while West Tennessee returned an equally heavy majority in favor. The deciding vote came in Middle Tennessee, which went from 51 percent against secession in February to 88 percent in favor in June.

Having ratified by popular vote its connection with the fledgling Confederacy, Tennessee became the last state to officially withdraw from the Union.

=== Unionism ===
Most people in East Tennessee were firmly against Tennessee's move to leave the Union; as were some in other parts of the Union, particularly in historically Whig portions of West Tennessee. Only about a third of the population in East Tennessee were in favor of secession. This was primarily due to the distribution of slavery throughout the state; Of the state's entire slave population, nearly 40% of West Tennessee and about 20% of Middle Tennessee's were slaves, but in East Tennessee, slaves made up only 8% of the population. The East Tennessee Convention, which met at Knoxville in May 1861 and at Greeneville in June 1861, consisted of 29 East Tennessee counties and one Middle Tennessee county (Scott County) that resolved to secede from Tennessee and form a separate state aligned with the Union. They petitioned the state legislature in Nashville, which denied their request to secede and sent Confederate troops under Felix Zollicoffer to occupy East Tennessee and prevent secession. Many East Tennesseans engaged in guerrilla warfare against state authorities by burning bridges, cutting telegraph wires, and spying. This led to widespread division and neighbor against neighbor conflict. The Union-backing State of Scott was also established at this time and remained a de facto enclave of the United States throughout the war, though it was never officially recognized by either sides of the war.

Tennessee provided more Union troops than any other Confederate state; more than 51,000 soldiers in total, more than 20,000 of whom were Black. Tennessee also provided 135,000 Confederate troops, the second-highest number after Virginia.

=== Battles ===
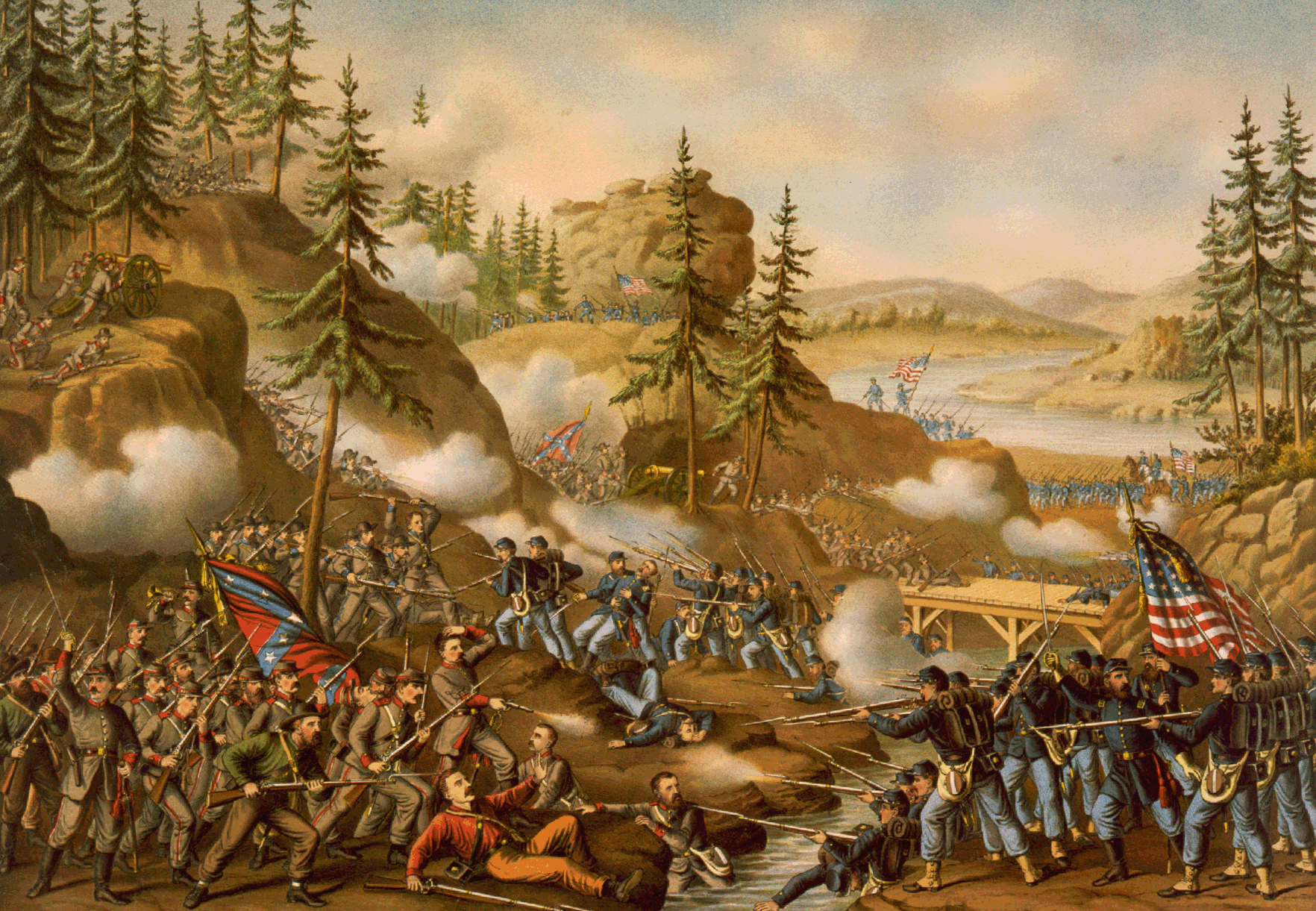
Third Battle of Chattanooga, November 23–25, 1863

Many battles were fought in the state – most of them Union victories. Ulysses S. Grant and the United States Navy captured control of the Cumberland and Tennessee Rivers in February 1862 and held off the Confederate counterattack at Shiloh in April of the same year. Capture of Memphis and Nashville gave the Union control of the Western and Middle sections. Control was confirmed at the Battle of Stones River at Murfreesboro in early January 1863.

After Nashville was captured (the first Confederate state capital to fall), Andrew Johnson, an East Tennessean from Greeneville, was appointed military governor of the state by Lincoln. The military government abolished slavery in the state and Union troops occupied much of the state through the end of the war.

The Confederates continued to hold East Tennessee despite the strength of Unionist sentiment there, with the exception of pro-Confederate Sullivan County. The Confederates besieged Chattanooga in early fall 1863 but were driven off by Grant in November. Many of the Confederate defeats can be attributed to the poor strategic vision of General Braxton Bragg, who led the Army of Tennessee from Shiloh to Confederate defeat at Chattanooga.

The last major battles came when the Confederates invaded in November 1864 and were checked at Franklin, then totally destroyed by George Thomas at Nashville in December.

== Reconstruction era and disenfranchisement ==
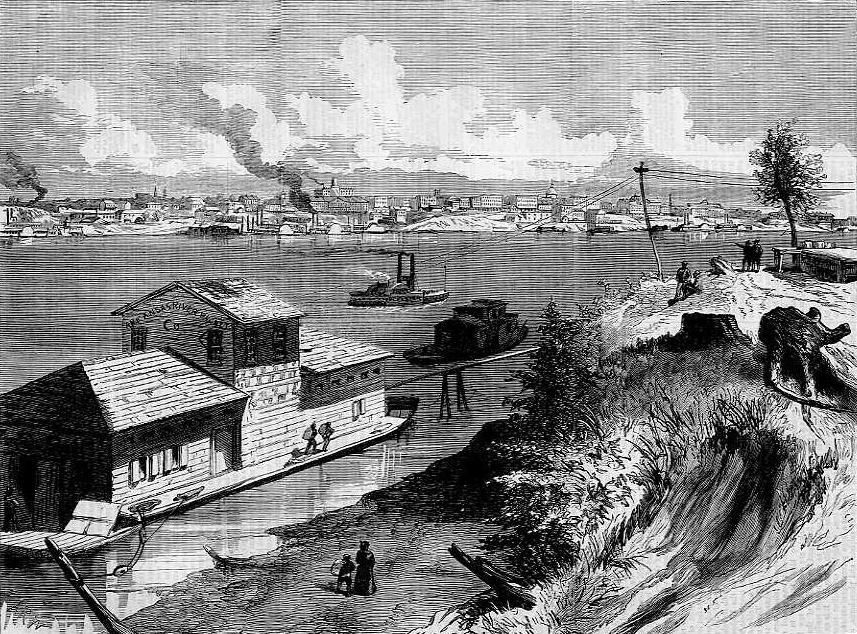
A View of Memphis, Tennessee, 1871

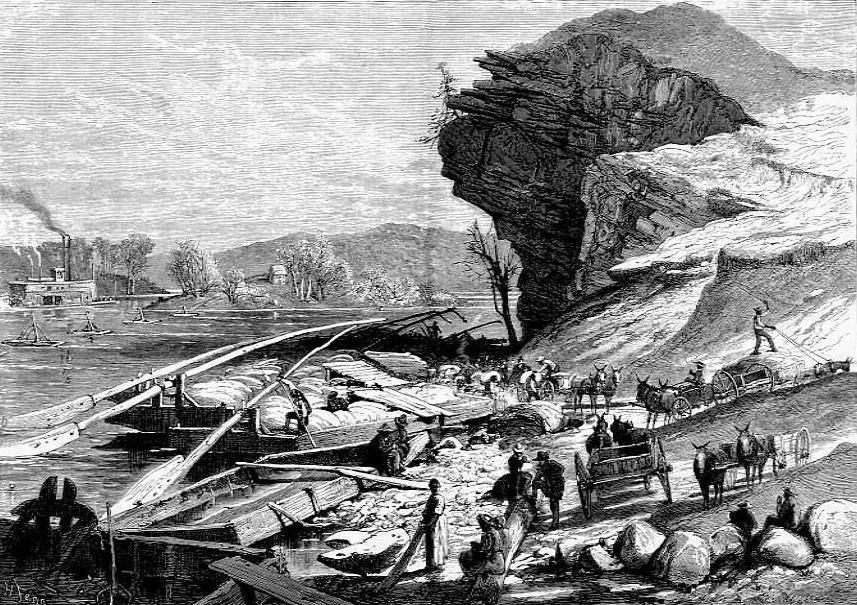
The Tennessee at Chattanooga, 1872, by Harry Fenn

After the war, Tennessee adopted the Thirteenth amendment forbidding slave-holding or involuntary servitude on February 22, 1865; ratified the Fourteenth Amendment to the United States Constitution on July 18, 1866, Under Republican governor Parson Brownlow it was the first Southern state readmitted to the Union on July 24, 1866.

Because it had ratified the Fourteenth Amendment, Tennessee was the only state that seceded from the Union that did not have a military governor during Reconstruction. "Proscription" was the policy of disqualifying as many ex-Confederates as possible. In 1865 Tennessee disfranchised upwards of 80,000 ex-Confederates.

There were only two or three African Americans in the Tennessee legislature during Reconstruction, though others served as state and city officers. With increased participation on the Nashville City Council, African Americans then held one-third of the seats.

In 1870, Southern Democrats regained control of the state legislature, and quickly reversed many of the reforms of the Parson Brownlow administration. In the political campaign of 1888, the Democrats waged a political battle and gained majorities in both houses of the legislature. The disenfranchising acts sailed through the 1889 general assembly, and Governor Robert Love Taylor signed them into law. These laws instituted a poll tax, required early voter registration, allowed secret ballots, and required separate ballot boxes for state and federal elections. The key provision was a poll tax. It was voluntary--the only penalty for not paying it was inability to vote in that year's election. In Memphis and Knoxville local bosses paid the poll tax and gave the receipts without charge to their Black supporters so they could vote without paying anything. Elsewhere Black voting declined precipitously in rural areas and small towns. The poll tax worked against poor whites as well until it was finally abolished in 1953.

Between 1877 and 1950, 236 lynchings of Black people in Tennessee have been documented, including hangings of Black politicians, journalists, businessmen and teachers. Lynchings were a form of social control whereby a victim's family, friends, and other community members were forced to adopt a public code of silence about the lynching or fear for their own lives. The identity of lynchers was almost always known, with local police often facilitating the act, and the local press praising it.

Tennessee divided three ways: the Democratic Party was in power in the Middle and Western sections; the Eastern mountain section was Republican based on its Unionist leanings before and during the war. In statewide elections the Democrats usually won unless factionalism split their supporters over issues like the prohibition of liquor.

== Tennessee Centennial ==
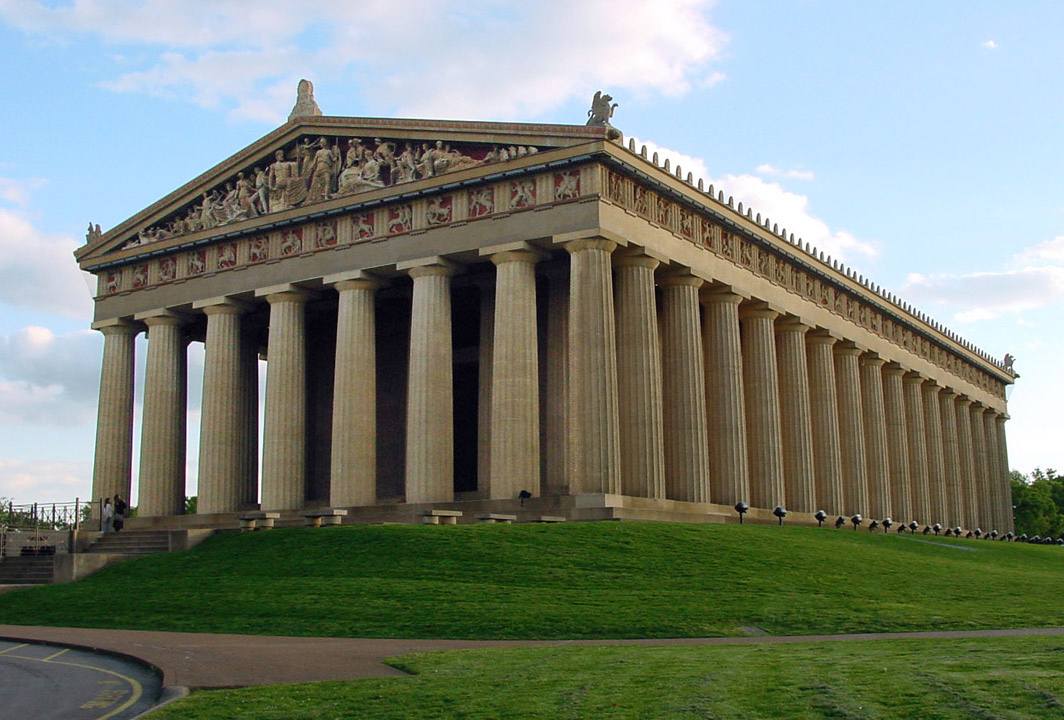
Nashville's replica of the Parthenon (built 1897)

In 1897, the state celebrated its centennial of statehood (albeit one year late) with a great exposition in Nashville. The Tennessee Centennial Exposition was the ultimate expression of the Gilded Age in the Upper South—a showcase of industrial technology and exotic papier-mâché versions of the world's wonders. The Nashville Parthenon, a full-scale replica of the Parthenon in Ancient Athens, Greece, was built in plaster, wood and brick. Rebuilt of concrete in the 1920s, it remains one of the city's attractions. During its six-month run at Centennial Park, the Exposition drew nearly two million visitors to see its dazzling monuments to the South's recovery. Governor Robert Taylor observed, "Some of them who saw our ruined country thirty years ago will certainly appreciate the fact that we have wrought miracles."

== Early 20th century ==
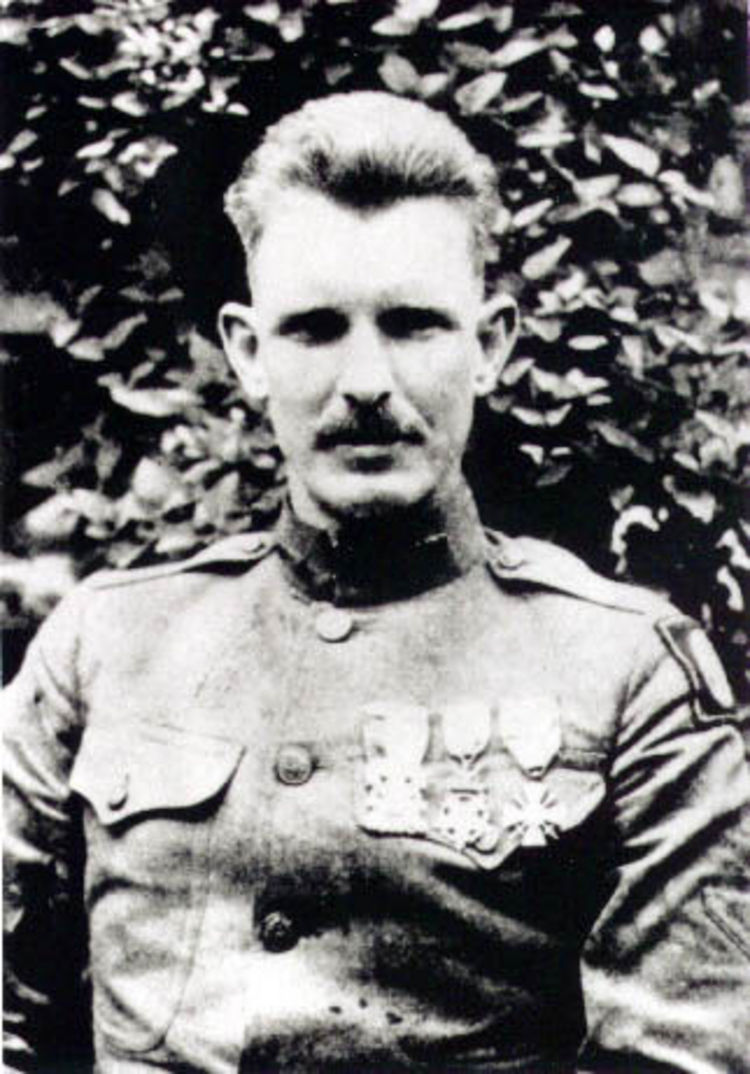
Alvin C. York

During the First World War (1914–1918), Tennessee provided the most celebrated American soldier, Alvin C. York, of Fentress County, Tennessee. He was a former conscientious objector who, in October 1918, subdued an entire German machine gun regiment in the Argonne Forest. Besides receiving the Medal of Honor and assorted French decorations, York became a powerful symbol of patriotism in the press and Hollywood film.

=== Women's rights ===
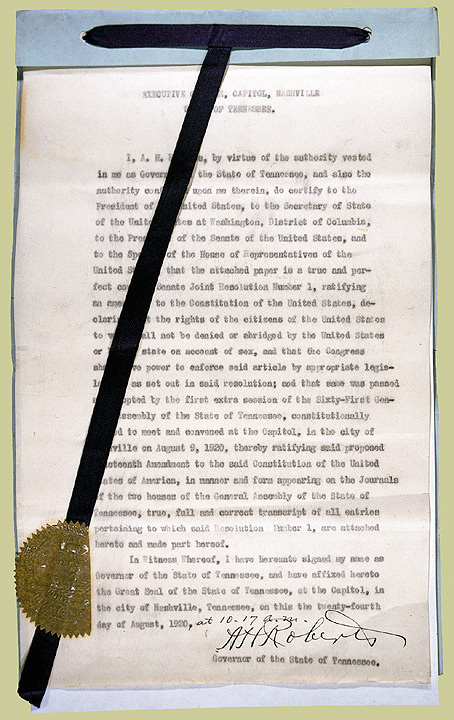
Tennessee's certificate of ratification of the Nineteenth Amendment

Tennessee became the focus of national attention during the campaign for women's voting rights. Like the temperance movement, women's suffrage was an issue with its roots in middle-class reform efforts of the late 19th century.

The organized movement came of age with the founding of the Tennessee Equal Suffrage Association in 1906, which gave the movement at least one national leader in Sue Shelton White from Henderson. There was a determined (and largely female) opposition, championed by the Chattanooga Times, the Nashville Banner and the Jonesboro Herald and Tribune. To overcome the opposition the Tennessee suffragists were moderate in their tactics and gained limited voting rights before the national question arose.

In August 1920, Governor Albert H. Roberts called a special session of the General Assembly to consider ratification of the Nineteenth Amendment to the U.S. Constitution. Leaders of the rival groups flooded into Nashville to lobby the General Assembly. In a close House vote, the suffrage amendment won passage when an East Tennessee legislator, Harry Burn, switched sides after receiving a telegram from his mother encouraging him to support ratification. On August 9, 1920, during a special session of the Sixty-First General Assembly, Tennessee's vote in favor of ratifying the Nineteenth Amendment, made it the pivotal state in the ratification process. Women immediately made their presence felt by swinging Tennessee to Warren Harding in the 1920 presidential election. It was the first time since 1868 that the state had voted for a Republican presidential candidate.

=== Scopes Trial ===
National attention came Tennessee's way during the trial of John T. Scopes, also called the Scopes Trial. In 1925, the General Assembly, as part of a general education bill, passed a law that forbade the teaching of evolution in the public schools. Some local boosters in Dayton, Tennessee concocted a scheme to have Scopes, a high school biology teacher, violate the law and stand trial as a way of drawing publicity and visitors to the town.

Their plan worked all too well, as the Rhea County Courthouse was turned into a circus of national and even international media coverage. Thousands flocked to Dayton to witness the high-powered legal counsels, William Jennings Bryan for the prosecution, and Clarence Darrow for the defense, argue their case.

Tennessee was ridiculed in the northeast and West Coast press as the "Monkey State," even as a wave of revivals defending religious fundamentalism swept the state. The trial was also given the name "Monkey Trial" by the same reporters. The legal outcome of the trial was inconsequential. Scopes was convicted and fined $100, a penalty later rescinded by the state court of appeals. The law itself remained on the books until 1967.

=== Country music birthplace ===
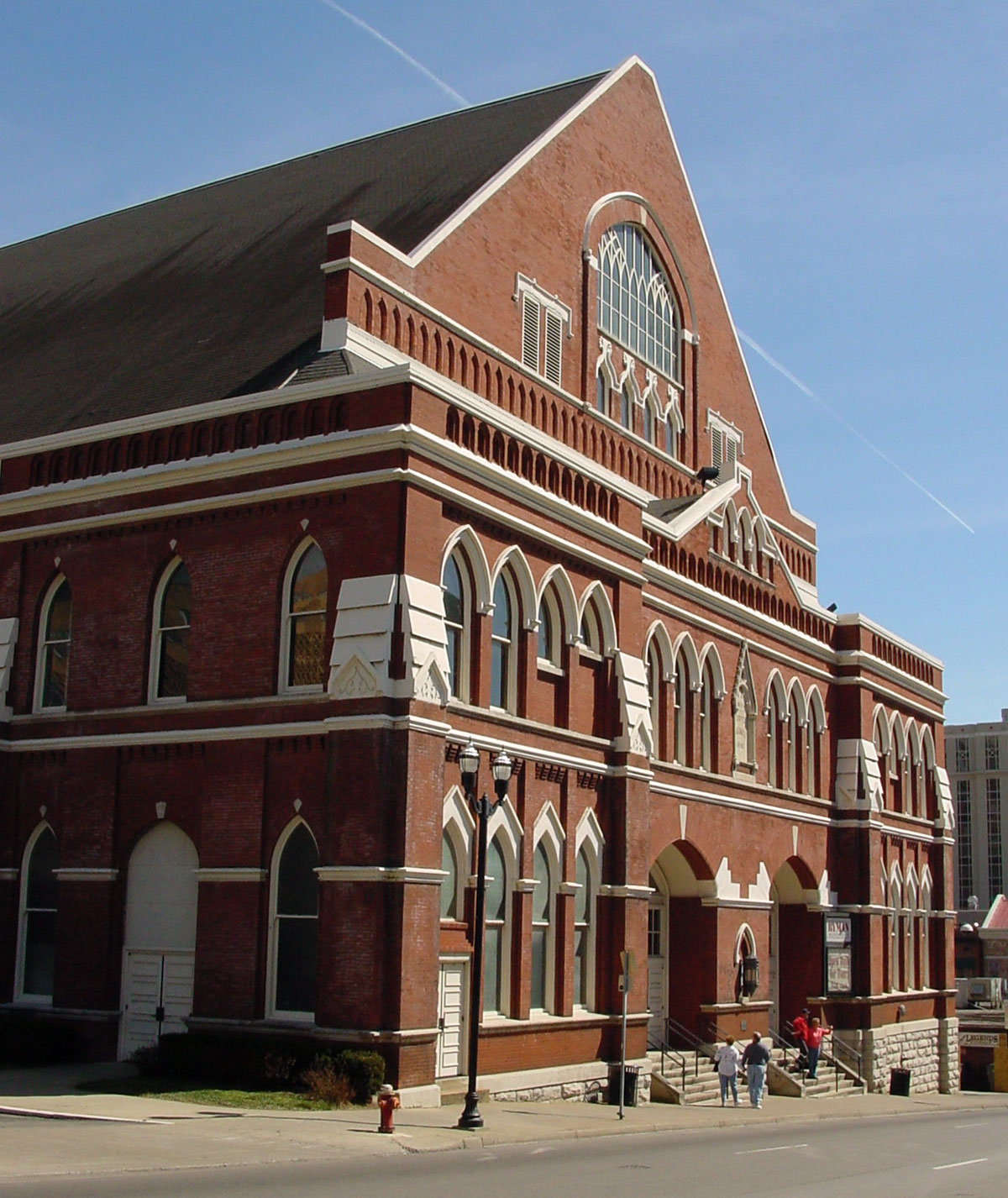
The Ryman Auditorium, home of the "Grand Ole Opry" in Nashville

At the very time that Tennessee's rural culture was under attack by urban critics, its music found a national audience.

In 1925, WSM, a powerful Nashville radio station, began broadcasting a weekly program of live music which soon was dubbed the "Grand Ole Opry." Such music came in diverse forms: banjo-and-fiddle string bands from Appalachia; family gospel singing groups; and country vaudeville acts (such as Murfreesboro native Uncle Dave Macon). As of 2014, the longest-running radio program in American history, the Opry used the new technology of radio to tap into a huge market for "old timey" or "hillbilly" music.

Two years after the Opry's opening, in a series of landmark sessions at Bristol, Tennessee, field scout Ralph Peer of the Victor Company recorded Jimmie Rodgers and the Carter Family to produce the first nationally popular rural records. Tennessee emerged as the heartland of traditional country music—home to many of the performers as well as the place from which it was broadcast to the nation.

=== The Great Depression and TVA ===
The need to create work for the unemployed during the Great Depression, the desire for rural electrification, and the desire to control the annual spring floods on the Tennessee River drove the federal government's creation of the Tennessee Valley Authority, the nation's largest public utility, in 1933. The TVA affected the lives of nearly all Tennesseans. The agency was created mainly through the persistence of Senator George Norris of Nebraska. Headquartered in Knoxville, it was charged with the task of planning the total development of the Tennessee River Valley. TVA sought to do this by building hydroelectric dams, constructing 20 between 1933 and 1951, as well as electricity-producing coal-fired power plants.

Inexpensive and abundant electrical power was the main benefit the TVA brought to Tennessee, particularly to rural areas that previously did not have electrical service. TVA brought electricity to about 60,000 farm households across the state. By 1945, TVA was the largest electrical utility in the nation, a supplier of vast amounts of power whose presence in Tennessee attracted large industries to relocate near one of its dams or steam plants. This incentive contributed to important economic development in the state.

== World War II and economic progress ==
Tennesseans participated in all phases of the war—from combat to civilian administration to military research. Dissent was minimal. The National policy emphasized production to help the Allies, and the state played its role while it recovered from depression and unemployment. Tennessee's home front experienced profound changes that transformed the state's economic landscape and social structure through several interconnected themes. The impact began in 1939, when President Franklin Roosevelt made supplying the Allies in their fight against Germany and Japan a high priority. By the time the United States entered the war in December 1941, most of the deleterious impact of the Great Depression had ended. Factories quickly retooled, shifting from civilian products to military supplies and equipment. Realizing that the draft that began in 1940 would eventually drain away most young men, companies hired as fast as they could, and government contracts paid the full wage bill. As a result, large numbers of previously underemployed women and blacks obtained good jobs. A third of the state's workers were women by 1945. Industrial Tennessee received war orders amounting to $1.25 billion. In chemicals key players included Du Pont, and Eastman Chemical Company. The new TVA operated at full blast to meet the immense power demands of war industries. It built or upgraded numerous dams and generating stations, which not only provided electricity but also improved navigation on the Tennessee River. A giant shell-loading plant was built at Milan. The Vultee Aircraft works in Nashville plant built O-49 observation planes and A-35 Vengeance dive bombers, and parts for the P-38 Lightning fighters. TVA projects also expanded in East Tennessee. The establishment of military bases and training facilities across Tennessee created massive economic benefits for local communities.

The war catalyzed significant social transformations throughout Tennessee. As men departed for military service, women and African Americans assumed positions in industries previously dominated by white males, embodying the "Rosie the Riveter" phenomenon. The new employment patterns generated social friction and adjustment challenges. Tennessee civilians actively supported the war effort through organized home front activities. Rationing required families to manage limited supplies of essential items including sugar, meat, and fuel using government-issued ration books. Communities organized extensive collection campaigns for metal, rubber, and paper materials needed for military production. Families cultivated Victory Gardens to supplement food supplies and save money.

A tenth of the population, 315,501 in all, served in the armed services. Farmers were exempt from the draft and worked to maximize agricultural output. Middle Tennessee residents played host to 28 Army divisions that swarmed over the countryside on maneuvers preparing for the D-Day invasion. Tennessee military personnel served with distinction in every theatre; 5,731 died during the war.

Very few at the time knew that Tennessee's greatest role was the Manhattan Project, the military's top secret project to build an atomic bomb. Research and production work for the first A-bombs were conducted at the huge scientific/industrial installation at Oak Ridge, Tennessee, a new community that was entirely a creation of the war. In four years it grew from empty woods in 1941 to a city of 70,000 (Tennessee's fifth largest).

With increased industrialization of the state's economy, the labor movement in the state gained momentum. It was already strong in the coal mines, but there John L. Lewis called a series of wartime strikes that deeply alienated public opinion.

In Washington, Cordell Hull was Secretary of State from 1933 to 1944. He received the Nobel Peace Prize in recognition of America's leadership in creating the United Nations. However all major foreign policy decisions were made in the White House, which rarely consulted Hull.

== Postwar progress 1945-1960 ==
The war accelerated the state's industrialization and the state led the nation in industrial growth rates between 1955 and 1965. By the 1950s, tens of thousands of Tennesseans left farms for Memphis, Nashville, Knoxville, and Chattanooga and smaller cities, and for the first time in its history, the state had more urban than rural dwellers. The post-war baby boom further acerated growth.

In 1950, workers at an American Enka Company factory near Morristown went on strike. Violence against strikebreakers forced Governor Gordon Browning to dispatch National Guard troops to restore order. By the end of the strike, the event had become the location of on-site congressional hearings and helped shape the nationwide image of troubled labor relations.

A moderate wing of the Southern Democrats gained influence, represented by Governor Frank G. Clement Senator Albert Gore Sr., and especially Senator Estes Kefauver. They welcomed labor unions and gave enough support to civil rights for Blacks as to anger the conservatives.

Sun Studio cut its first rock and roll recording in 1952, launching a cultural phenomenon that made Memphis the capital of a new music genre.

=== Poll tax issues ===
Disenfranchising legislation of the late 19th century had affected poor whites as well as blacks. The $2 poll tax was optional and few poor people paid it, and so they could not vote. Some county officers encouraged voting by providing easy opportunities to pay the tax (as they did in Knoxville). Other discouraged voting by making payment as difficult as possible. Crump in Memphis raised cash to buy blocks of poll tax receipts and distributed them to his supporters who could thereby vote. Anti-poll tax reformers had no success until in 1943 the legislature rescind the poll tax. However the Tennessee Supreme Court declared that action unconstitutional. It was not until 1953 that a new constitutional convention finally removed provisions for the poll tax.

== 1960s: Civil Rights Movement ==
Tennessee played an important and prominent role during the Civil Rights Movement. Many national civil rights leaders, such as Martin Luther King Jr., received training in methods of nonviolent protest at the Highlander Folk School in Monteagle, Tennessee. The same nonviolent methods which Mahatma Gandhi had used were taught here.

In the spring of 1960, after decades of segregation, Tennessee's Jim Crow laws were challenged by an organized group of Nashville college students from Fisk University, American Baptist Theological Seminary, and Vanderbilt University. The students, led by Jim Farmer, John Lewis, and ministers of local African-American churches, used methods of non-violent protest in anticipation of a planned and concerted effort to desegregate Nashville's downtown lunch counters through a series of sit-ins. Although many were harassed and beaten by vigilantes and arrested by the Nashville police, none of the students retaliated with violence.

The Nashville sit-ins reached a turning point when the house of Z. Alexander Looby, a prominent African-American attorney and leader, was bombed. Although no one was killed, thousands of protesters spontaneously marched to Nashville City Hall to confront Mayor Ben West. Meeting the mass of protesters outside city hall, West informally debated with them and concluded by conceding that segregation was immoral. The bombing, the march, and Mayor West's statement helped convince downtown lunch counters to desegregate. Although segregation and Jim Crow were by no means over, the episode served as one of the first successful events of mostly nonviolent protest.

The community leadership and activism of African Americans in the Civil Rights Movement across the South gained passage of the national Civil Rights Act of 1964 and the Voting Rights Act of 1965. African Americans gained more civil rights and the power to exercise their voting rights. Voting rights for all races were protected by provisions of the Voting Rights Act.

=== Martin Luther King Jr. assassination ===
In contrast to the successes of the movement in Tennessee, the 1968 assassination of Martin Luther King Jr., in Memphis was perceived as symbolic of hatred in the state. King was in the city to support a strike by black sanitary public works employees of AFSCME Local 1733. The city quickly settled the strike on favorable terms to the employees. Riots and civil unrest erupted in African-American areas in numerous cities across the country, resulting in widespread injuries and millions of dollars in property damages. In Memphis the long-term result was a systematic improvement in the political and economic position of the Blacks community.

== Latter half of 20th century ==
In 1953, voters approved eight amendments to the state constitution, which extended the governor's term from two to four years, prohibiting two successive terms, and outlawed the poll tax.

In the years following World War II, Tennessee's economy continued to industrialize, and demand for energy grew faster than ever before. TVA built additional dams and coal-fired power plants in the state during the postwar years.

By the 1960s and onward, the state experienced economic growth due to the construction of the Interstate Highway System. Most of the state's interstates were completed by the mid-1970s. The construction of Interstate 40 through Memphis became a national talking point on the issue of eminent domain and grassroots lobbying, when the Tennessee Department of Transportation (TDOT) attempted to acquire Overton Park from the city of Memphis for the highway's right-of-way. A local activist group spent many years contesting the project and filed a series of lawsuits to stop the construction through the park. The case made its way to the U.S. Supreme Court in the 1971 landmark case Citizens to Preserve Overton Park v. Volpe. The court sided in favor of the activist group, and established the framework for judicial review of government agencies.

In 1977, a state constitutional convention was held that recommended 13 amendments to the state's constitution, 12 of which votes approved the next year. The changes allowed governors to serve two consecutive terms, required the General Assembly to balance the state's annual budget, reformed county legislative bodies, and removed provisions that had been invalidated by federal legislation and court cases during the Civil Rights Movement.

TVA's construction of the Tellico Dam in Loudon County became the subject of national controversy in the 1970s when the endangered snail darter fish was reported to be affected by the project. After lawsuits by environmental groups, the debate was decided by the U.S. Supreme Court case Tennessee Valley Authority v. Hill in 1978, leading to amendments of the Endangered Species Act that same year.

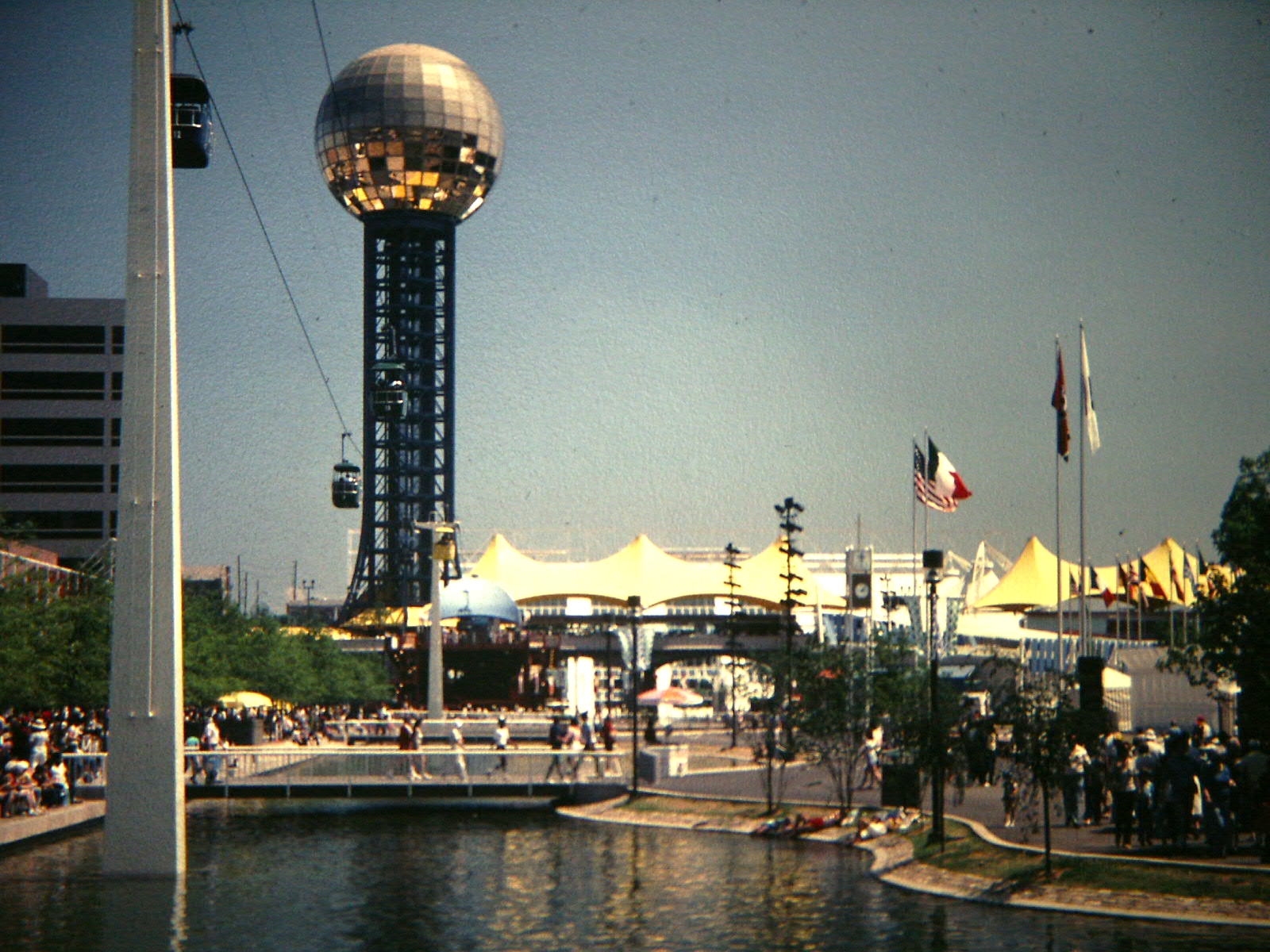
The 1982 World's Fair in Knoxville

The 1982 World's Fair was held in Knoxville. Also known as the Knoxville International Energy Exposition, the fair's theme was "Energy Turns the World". The exposition was one of the most successful, and the last world's fair to be held in the United States as of 2021. In 1986, Tennessee held a yearlong celebration of the state's heritage and culture called "Homecoming '86". As part of the celebration, citizens of individual communities throughout the state researched their history, set future goals, conducted projects to preserve, promote, or enhance the quality of their respective communities, and organized other celebratory events.

Tennessee celebrated its bicentennial in 1996 after a yearlong statewide celebration entitled "Tennessee 200" by opening a new state park—the Bicentennial Mall—at the foot of Capitol Hill in Nashville.

== 21st century ==
In 2002, Democrat Phil Bredesen became the 48th governor, and Tennessee amended the state constitution to allow for the establishment of a lottery; voters approved the lottery amendment in a statewide referendum that repealed the constitutional ban and authorized lottery proceeds to fund college scholarships and education programs. In 2006, Tennessee saw the only freshman Republican, Bob Corker, elected to the United States Senate in the midst of the 2006 midterm elections, defeating Democratic U.S. Rep. Harold Ford Jr. in a high-profile contest. That year, the Constitution was also amended to reject same-sex marriage through the Tennessee Marriage Protection Amendment, which passed with overwhelming voter support; the ban remained in force until it was struck down by the U.S. Supreme Court in 2015. In January 2007, Ron Ramsey became the first Republican to become Speaker of the State Senate since Reconstruction.

In 2010, during the historic 2010 midterm elections, Bill Haslam succeeded Bredesen, who was term-limited, to become the 49th Governor of Tennessee. Haslam's election, combined with Republican majorities in both chambers of the Tennessee General Assembly, gave the Republican Party a government trifecta in Tennessee for the first time since the Reconstruction era in 1869.

In April and May 2010, flooding in Middle Tennessee devastated Nashville and other parts of Middle Tennessee. In April 2011, parts of East Tennessee, including Hamilton and Bradley counties, were devastated by the 2011 Super Outbreak, the largest and costliest tornado outbreak in history.

In 2014, Tennessee voters approved Amendment 1, a legislatively referred constitutional amendment stating that "nothing in this Constitution secures or protects a right to abortion or requires the funding of an abortion," giving the state legislature broader authority to regulate abortion policy; the measure passed by approximately 53% of the vote.

In 2018, Republican Marsha Blackburn was elected to the U.S. Senate, becoming the first woman to represent Tennessee in the U.S. Senate when she defeated former Governor Phil Bredesen in a closely watched race; she succeeded Bob Corker. Bill Lee was elected governor to succeed Bill Haslam.

In 2020, Republican Bill Hagerty was elected to succeed outgoing senator and former governor Lamar Alexander.

Tennessee also faced significant challenges in the 2020s, including the COVID-19 pandemic, which reached the state in early March 2020 and led to widespread public-health responses and economic impacts across Tennessee communities. Additionally, the state experienced the deadly March 3, 2020 Nashville tornado, an EF3 twister that caused extensive damage and loss of life in Middle Tennessee amid the broader severe weather season.

Following the 2020 Census, the Republican-controlled Tennessee Legislature redrew the state’s congressional districts in 2021–22. The plan split Nashville—which had long been a part of a Democratic-leaning 5th District—into three districts, a move critics described as a partisan gerrymander that diluted urban and minority voting power. In the 2022 election, Republican Andy Ogles won the redrawn 5th District, becoming the first Republican to represent a major portion of Nashville in roughly 150 years.

In 2022, Tennessee's population grew to over 7 million.

In March 2023, a mass shooting at The Covenant School in Nashville resulted in the deaths of six people, including three children and three adults; the shooter, identified by police as a former student, carried out the attack before being killed by responding officers. The attack drew national attention to issues of school safety and prompted ongoing discussions about preventing mass violence.

In April 2023, the Tennessee House of Representatives voted on resolutions to remove three Democratic members — Reps. Justin Jones, Justin Pearson, and Gloria Johnson — from the chamber following their participation in a protest on the House floor calling for stronger gun‑control measures after the Covenant School shooting that killed six people. Jones and Pearson were expelled after the vote met the two‑thirds majority required, while the resolution to remove Johnson failed by one vote. Republican legislators described the action as enforcement of chamber decorum rules, saying the lawmakers' conduct violated procedural regulations, while critics characterized the expulsions as unprecedented in modern times and a partisan response to political protest. Both expelled members were later reinstated to their seats by local governing bodies and won special elections to return to the House later in 2023.

Construction of a new stadium for the Tennessee Titans began in early 2024 with a formal groundbreaking on February 29, marking the start of a roughly $2.1 billion project to replace the franchise’s longtime home at Nissan Stadium; the enclosed venue is planned to seat about 60,000 fans and is scheduled to open in February 2027. The project reached a major milestone in late 2025 when crews placed the final structural steel beam, completing the stadium’s main framework, and work is now focused on roofing and interior build‑out ahead of the planned 2027 debut.

In January 2025, a shooting at Antioch High School in Nashville resulted in the death of one student and the perpetrator’s suicide; the incident sparked renewed debate over school security and gun access in Tennessee.

On 10 October 2025, an explosion occurred at a military explosives handler in Hickman County, killing multiple workers and leaving over a dozen others unaccounted for as emergency agencies responded to the scene.

== See also ==
- African Americans in Tennessee
- History of the Southern United States
- Timeline of Tennessee
- List of historical societies in Tennessee

Cities in Tennessee

- Timeline of Chattanooga, Tennessee
- Timeline of Knoxville, Tennessee
- Timeline of Memphis, Tennessee
- Timeline of Nashville, Tennessee

== Bibliography ==
- Connelly, Thomas Lawrence (1979). Civil War Tennessee: Battles and Leaders. Knoxville: University of Tennessee Press. ISBN 9780870492617 – via Google Books.
- Corlew, Robert E.; Folmsbee, Stanley E.; Mitchell, Enoch (1981). Tennessee: A Short History (2nd ed.). Knoxville: University of Tennessee Press. ISBN 9780870496479 – via Internet Archive.
- Finger, John R. (2001). Tennessee Frontiers: Three Regions in Transition. Indiana University Press. ISBN 978-0-253-33985-0.
- Lamon, Lester C. (1980). Blacks in Tennessee, 1791–1970. University of Tennessee Press. ISBN 978-0-87049-324-9.
- Langsdon, Phillip R. (2000). Tennessee: A Political History. Franklin, Tennessee: Hillboro Press. ISBN 9781577361251 – via Internet Archive.
- Lyons, William; Scheb II, John M.; Stair, Billy (2001). Government and Politics in Tennessee. Knoxville: University of Tennessee Press. ISBN 9781572331419 – via Google Books.
- Moore, Harry (1994). A Geologic Trip Across Tennessee by Interstate 40. Knoxville: University of Tennessee Press. pp. 55–56. ISBN 9780870498329 – via Google Books.
- Safford, James M. (1869). Geology of Tennessee. Nashville: S.C. Mercer. ISBN 978-1-4585-0040-3 – via Google Books.
- Satz, Ronald (1979). Tennessee's Indian Peoples. Knoxville, Tennessee: University of Tennessee Press. ISBN 978-0-87049-285-3 – via Internet Archive.
