= List of Tennessee state symbols =

Location of the state of Tennessee in the United States of America

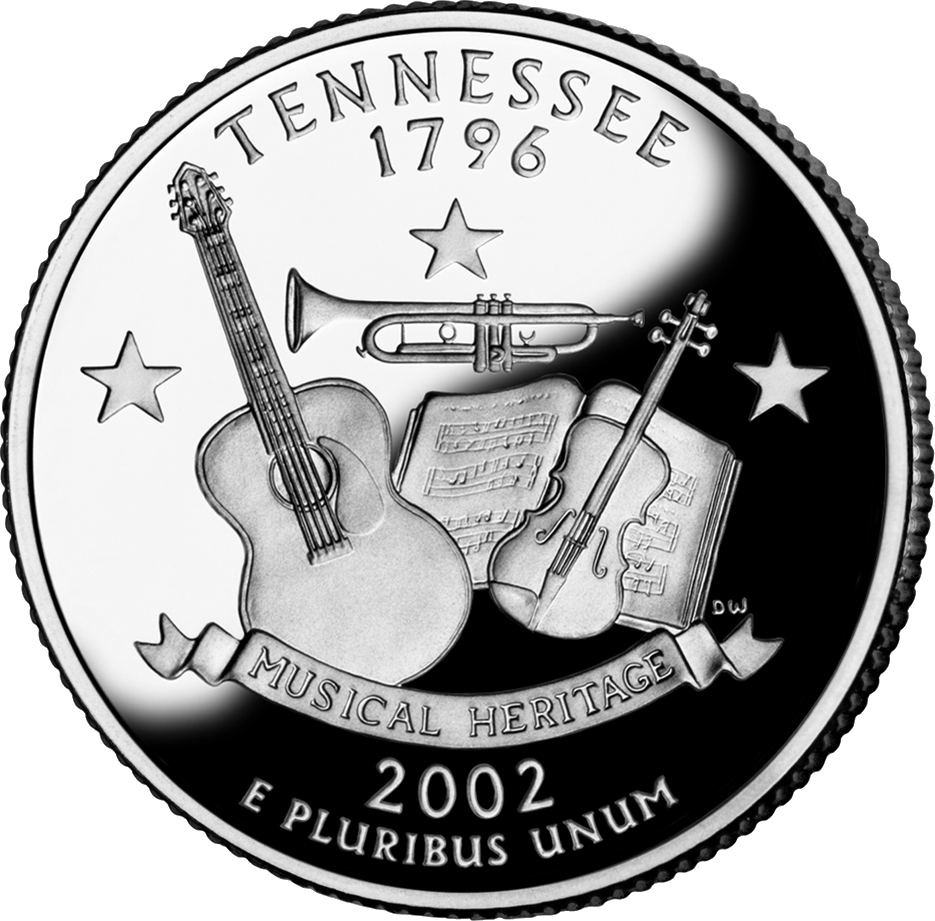

Tennessee, the Volunteer State, has many symbols.

Official symbols of the state are designated by act of the Tennessee General Assembly. The earliest state symbol was the first state seal, which was authorized by the original state constitution of 1796 and first used in 1802. The current seal design was adopted in 1987.

The General Assembly also has officially designated a state slogan, "Tennessee—America at Its Best", adopted in 1965, and a state motto, "Agriculture and Commerce", adopted in 1987 and based on the words on the state seal.

"The Volunteer State", was originated during the War of 1812 when many Tennesseans enlisted in the military in response to Governor Willie Blount's call for volunteers.

== Symbols ==
Flag

Main article: Flag of Tennessee

Tennessee's state flag, adopted in 1905, has three stars representing the state's three Grand Divisions: West, Middle, and East Tennessee. The designer was LeRoy Reeves of the Tennessee National Guard, who explained: "The three stars are of pure white, representing the three grand divisions of the state. They are bound together by the endless circle of the blue field, the symbol being three bound together in one – an indissoluble trinity."

Seal

Main article: Seal of Tennessee

Tennessee's current state seal, adopted in 1987, is a modernized version of the seal originally designed in 1801. The seal features the words "Agriculture" and "Commerce" and the date of the state's founding. The number 16 appears as a Roman numeral, signifying that Tennessee was the 16th U.S. state. The theme of Agriculture is illustrated by images of a plow, a bundle of wheat, and a cotton plant, while the theme of Commerce is illustrated by an image of a riverboat.

Tree

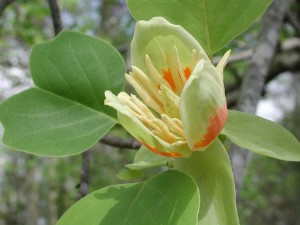
State tree - tulip poplar (Liriodendron tulipifera)

In 1947 the tulip poplar was designated as the official state tree of Tennessee. The General Assembly act stated that it was chosen "because it grows from one end of the state to the other" and "was extensively used by the pioneers of the state to construct houses, barns, and other necessary farm buildings."
Flowers

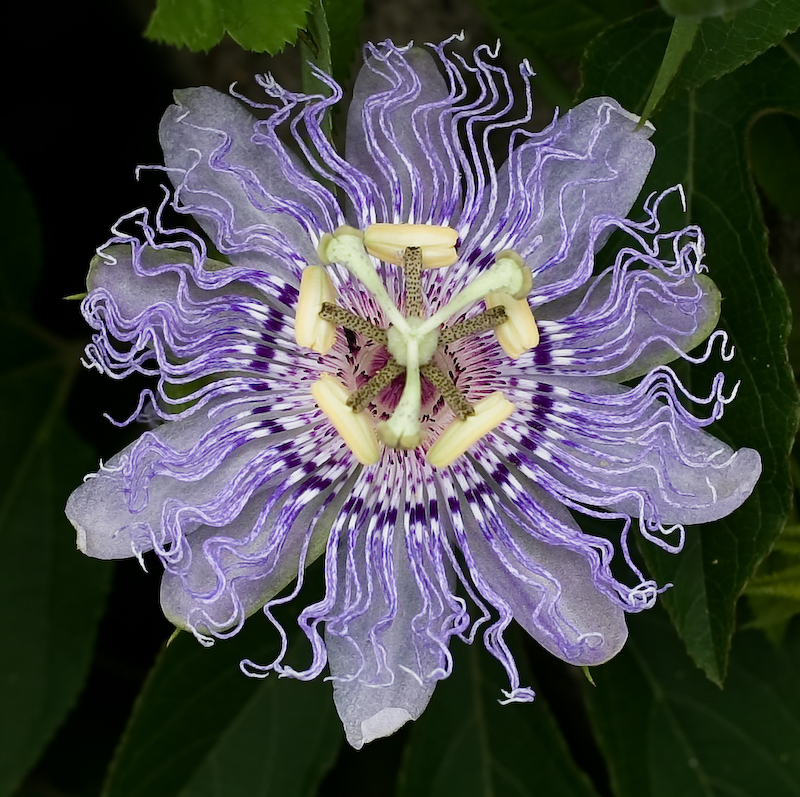
State wildflower - passion flower

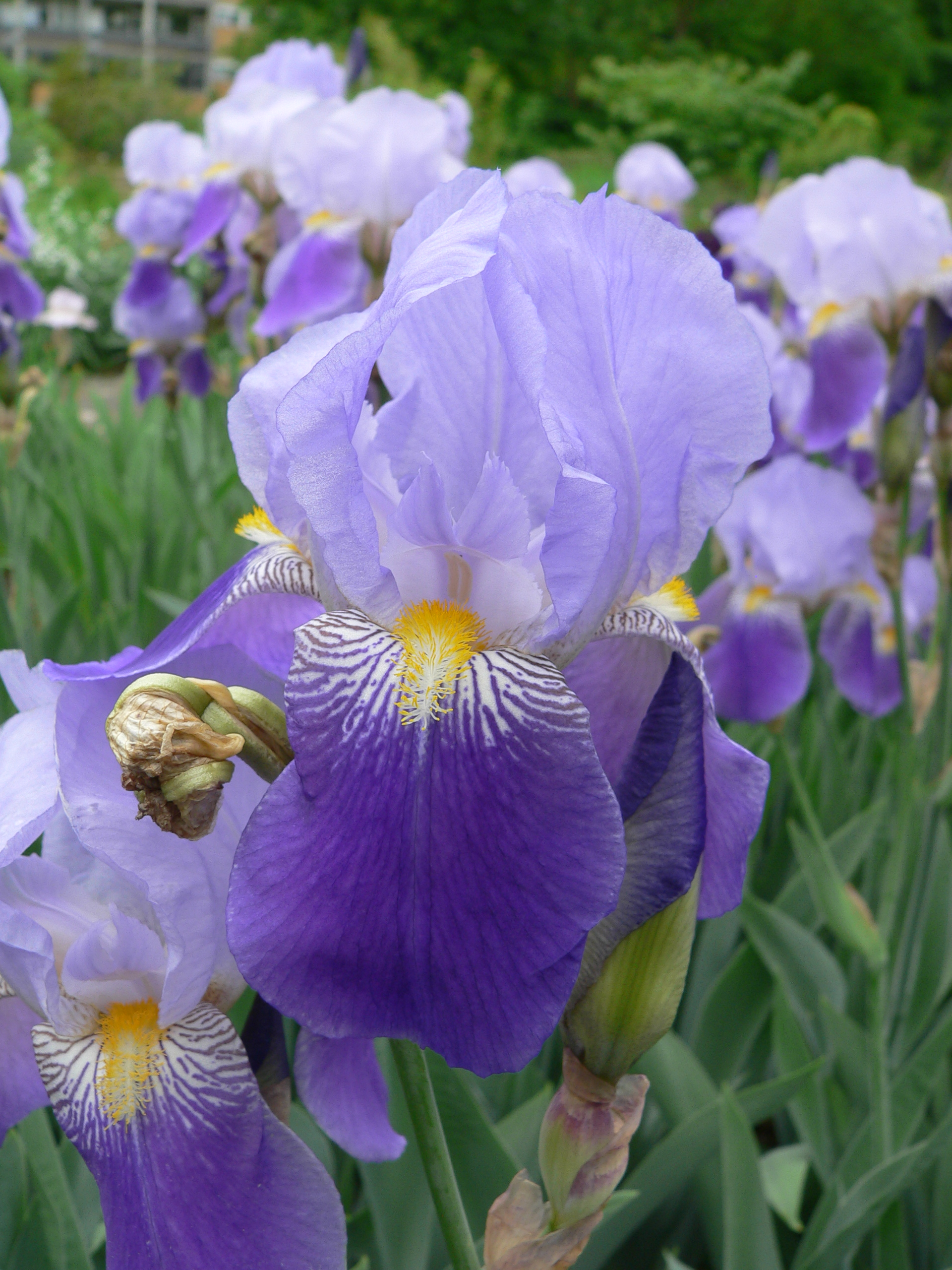
State cultivated flower - iris

Tennessee has two state flowers. The purple passionflower (Passiflora incarnata) is the state's wildflower and the iris is the state's cultivated flower.

In 1919, the Tennessee General Assembly passed a resolution providing for a state flower to be chosen by a vote of the state's school children, with the process to be overseen by a five-member commission. The resolution stated "That the flower which shall be named by the school children and certified by the commission shall be recognized as the State flower." Shortly after the resolution was enacted, a newspaper listed children's favorite flowers as including daisy, elder bloom, goldenrod, red clover, rose, sunflower, water lily, wild rose, and violet. However, after the votes were counted, the commission announced that the school children had selected the passion flower, making it the state flower. The purple passionflower, called ocoee by the Cherokee and colloquially known as "maypop", is native throughout the state and was reported to be abundant.

By the early 1930s, flower gardening was growing in popularity, garden clubs were being organized, and Nashville had become known for the iris. Gardeners campaigned to have the iris designated the state flower, and in 1933 the General Assembly adopted a resolution stating "The State of Tennessee has never adopted a State Flower" and designating the iris as the "State Flower of Tennessee."

Because the General Assembly had designated the iris as the state flower without rescinding the previous designation of the passion flower, the state essentially had two state flowers until 1973. In that year the General Assembly resolved the confusion by designating the passion flower the state wildflower and the iris the state cultivated flower.

The act naming the iris as the state flower did not specify a particular color or variety of this diverse plant. However, according to the Tennessee Department of State the purple iris is generally considered to be the state flower.

Fruit

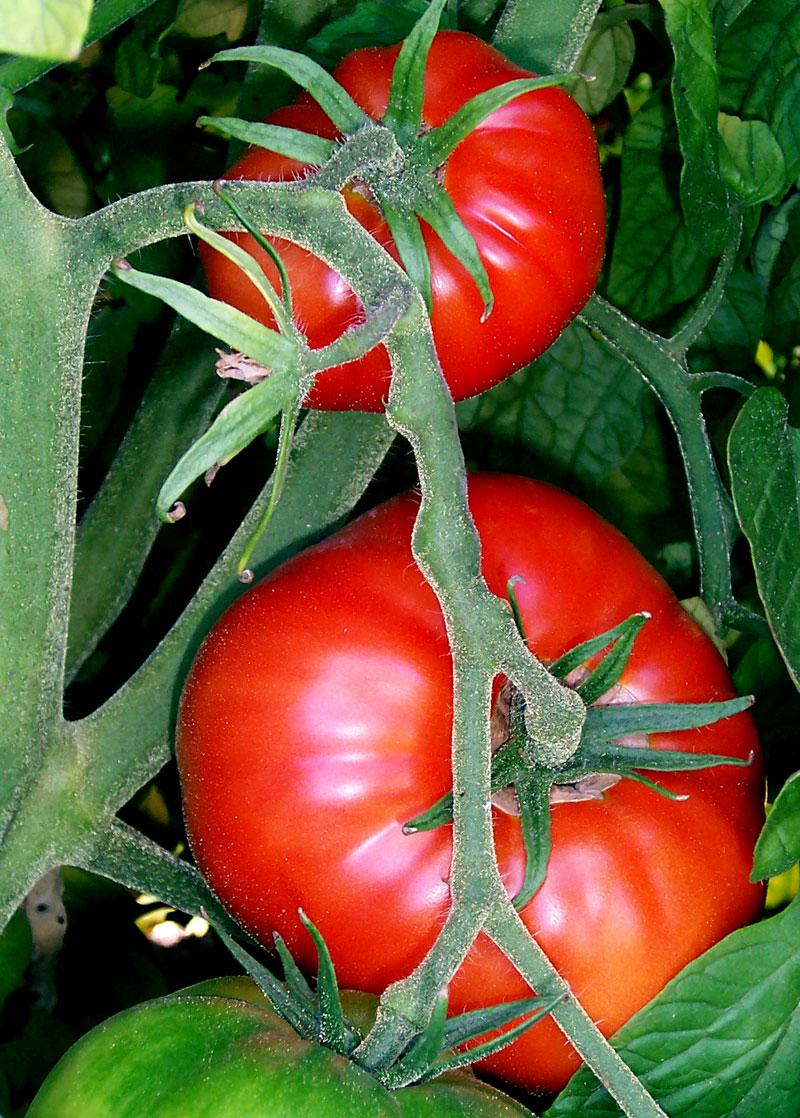
State fruit - tomato

In March 2003, the General Assembly enacted chapter 154 of the Public Acts, designating the tomato as the official state fruit of Tennessee. As of 2003, tomatoes were the state's largest fruit crop. Grainger County and the Ripley area in Lauderdale County are principal areas for tomato production. The legislation to designate the tomato was sponsored by state Representative Dennis Roach of Rutledge, in Grainger County. No particular variety of tomato is specified.
Food

Hot slaw was designated an official state food in 2024, by the 113th General Assembly.
Birds

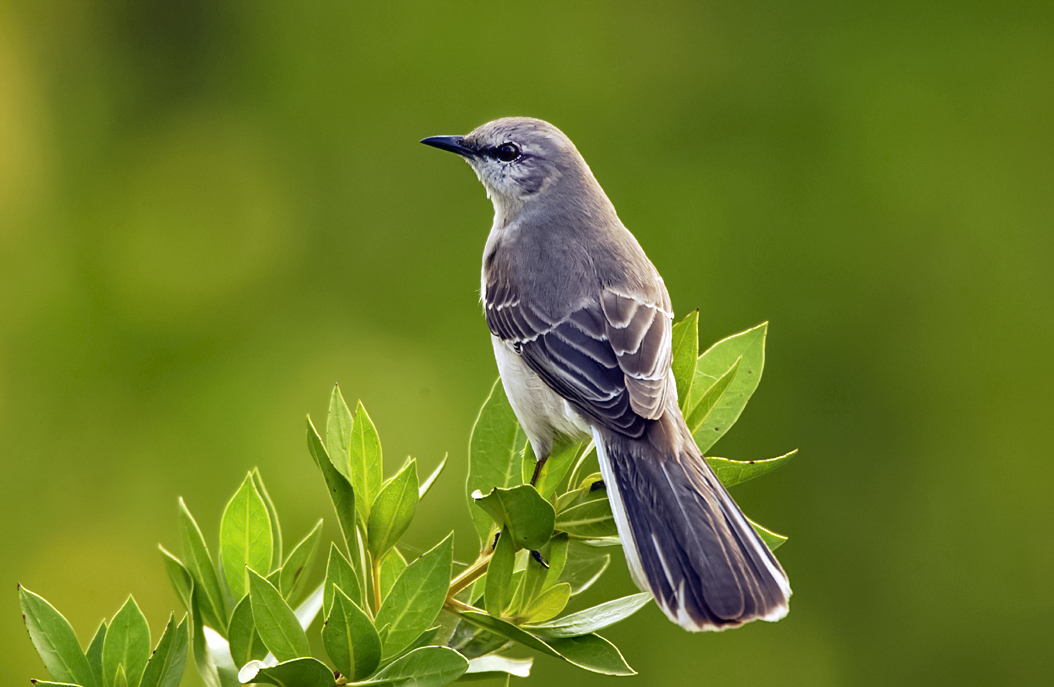
State bird - mockingbird

Tennessee has two state birds. The mockingbird (Mimus polyglottos) was designated the state bird by the General Assembly in 1933. It had been selected earlier that year in an election conducted by the Tennessee Ornithological Society.

The bobwhite quail (Colinus virginianus), also known as the partridge, was designated as the official state game bird by the General Assembly in 1988.

Fish

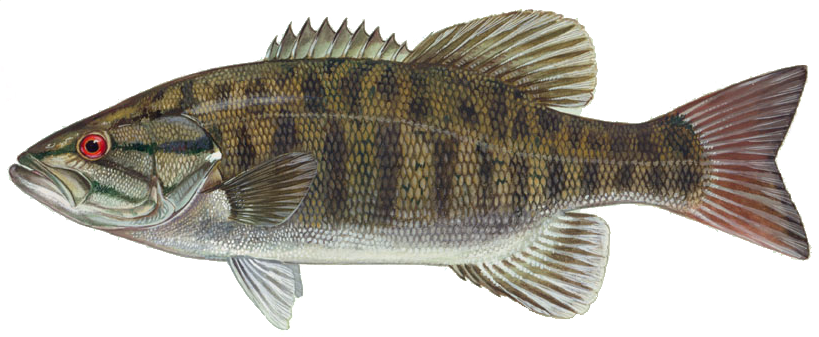
State sport fish - smallmouth bass

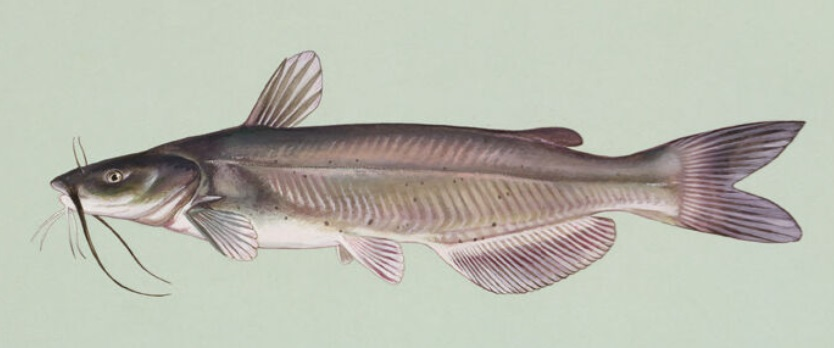
State commercial fish - channel catfish

Tennessee has two state fish. The official state sport fish, designated in 2005, is the smallmouth bass (Micropterus dolomieu), a sought-after game fish.

The state commercial fish, designated in 1988, is the channel catfish, Ictalurus lacustris, which is found in most Tennessee streams and many lakes and is widely stocked and reared in farm ponds.

Wild animal

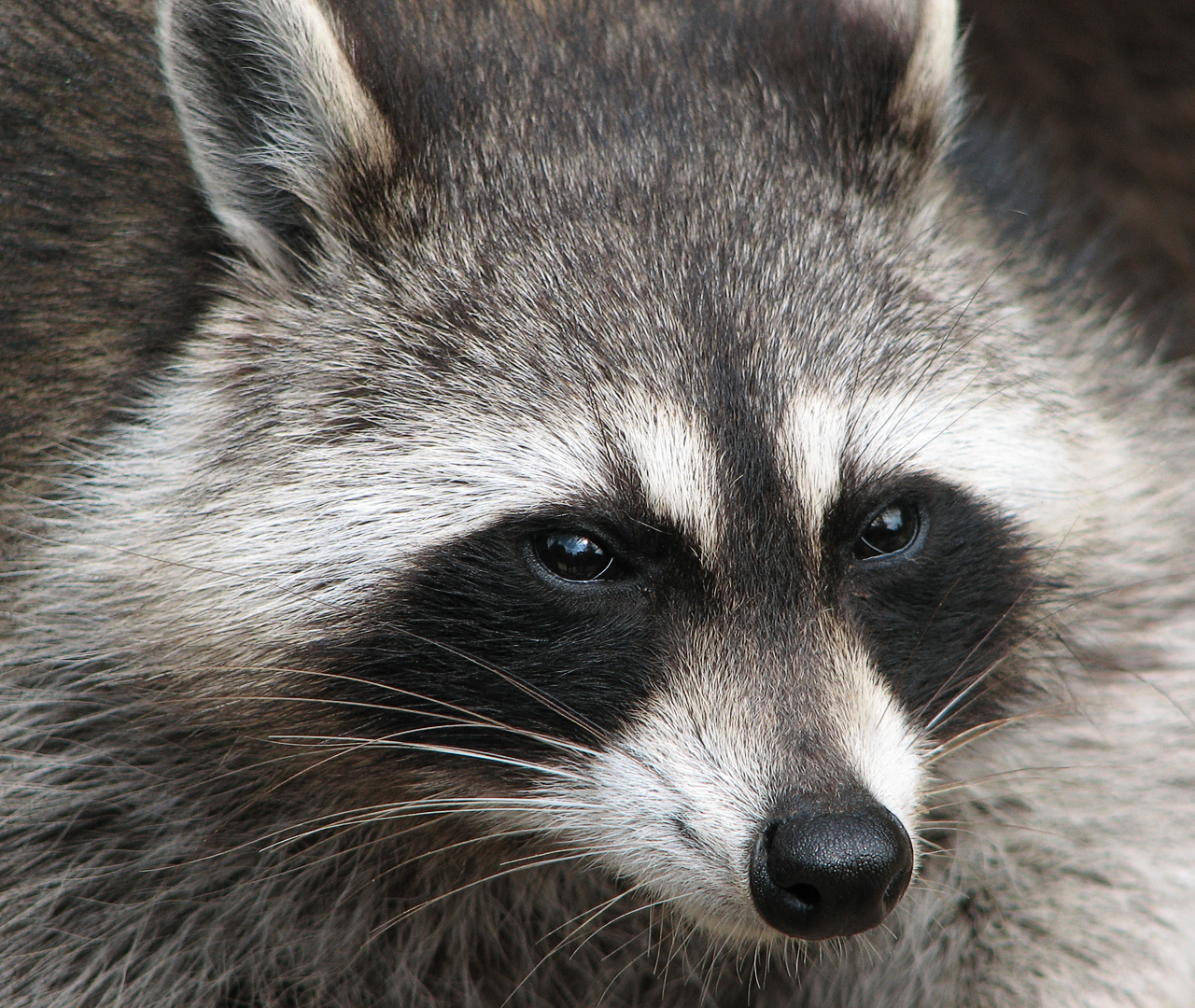
State wild animal - raccoon

The raccoon (Procyon lotor) became the official state wild animal in 1971.
Horse

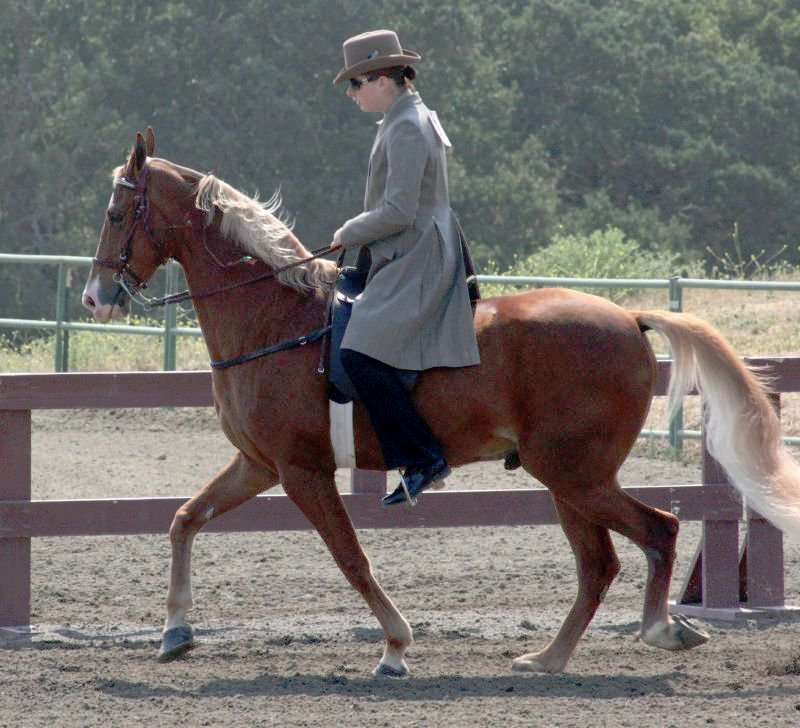
State horse - Tennessee Walking Horse

The Tennessee Walking Horse was designated the official state horse by the 101st General Assembly in 2000.
Reptile

State reptile - eastern box turtle

Tennessee's state reptile is the eastern box turtle (Terrapene carolina), designated in 1995.
Amphibian

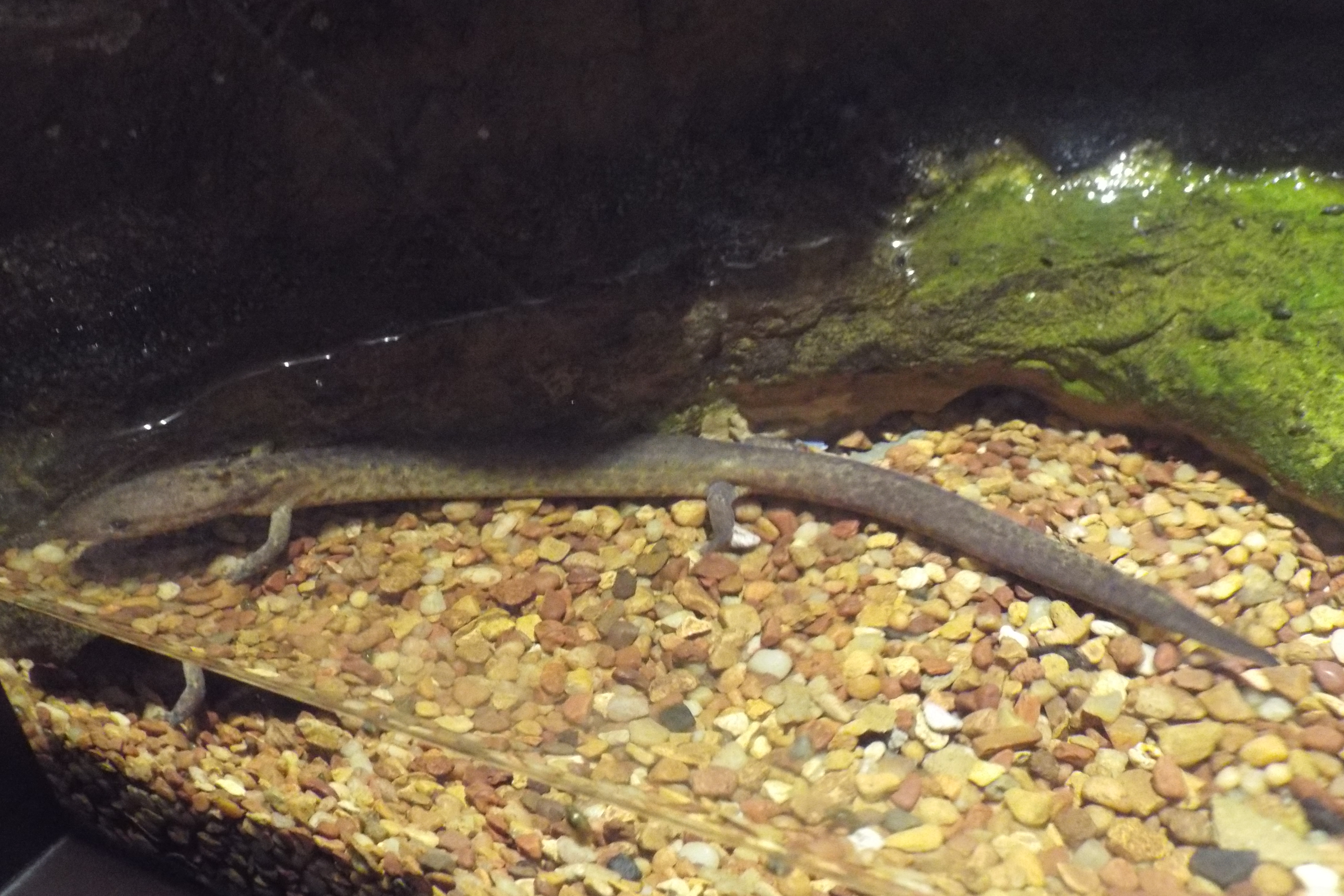
State amphibian - Tennessee cave salamander

In 1995 the Tennessee cave salamander (Gyrinophilu palleucus) was designated official state amphibian by the 99th General Assembly. This is a large salamander that lives in streams in limestone caves in the southern Cumberland Plateau and the Nashville Basin.
Insects

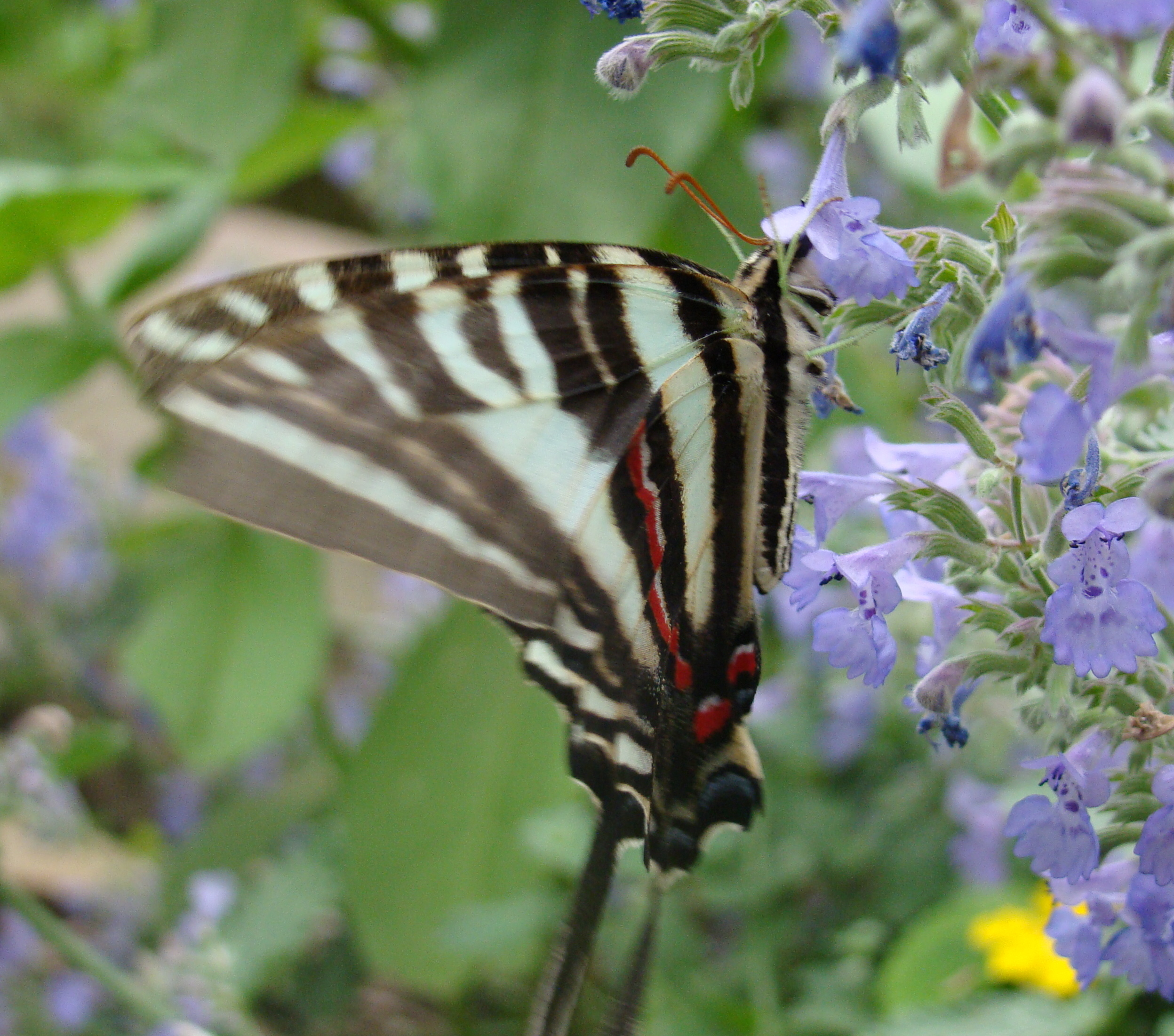
State butterfly - zebra swallowtail

Tennessee has designated four different insects as official state symbols.

The firefly or lightning bug (Lampyridae family) and the insect known as ladybeetle, ladybug, or ladybird beetle, Coccinella septempunctata, were designated state insects by Public Chapter 292 of the Acts of 1975. The firefly species Photinus pyralis is the most familiar firefly species in the state.

In 1990, Public Chapter 725 designated the honeybee (Apis mellifera) as the official state agricultural insect.

Most recently, in 1995 the zebra swallowtail, Eurytides marcellus, was designated Tennessee's official butterfly by Public Chapter 896 of the 99th General Assembly.

Rocks

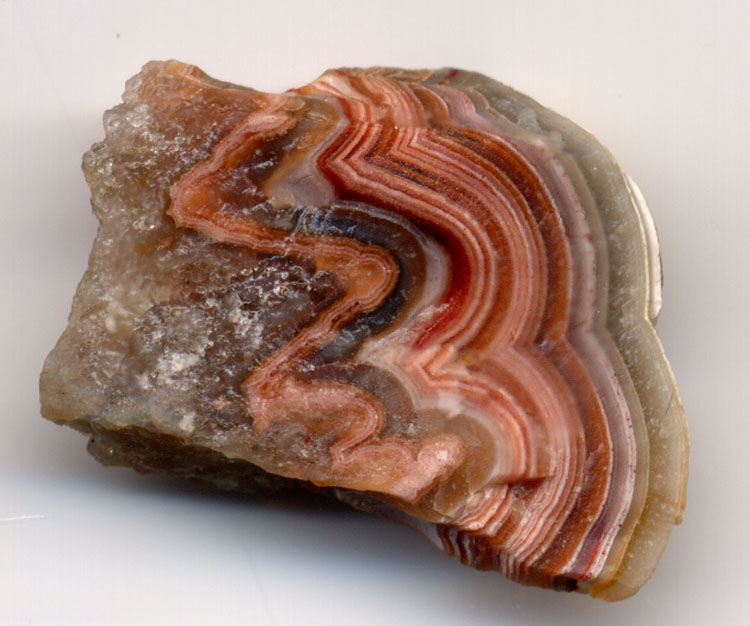
State rocks - agate

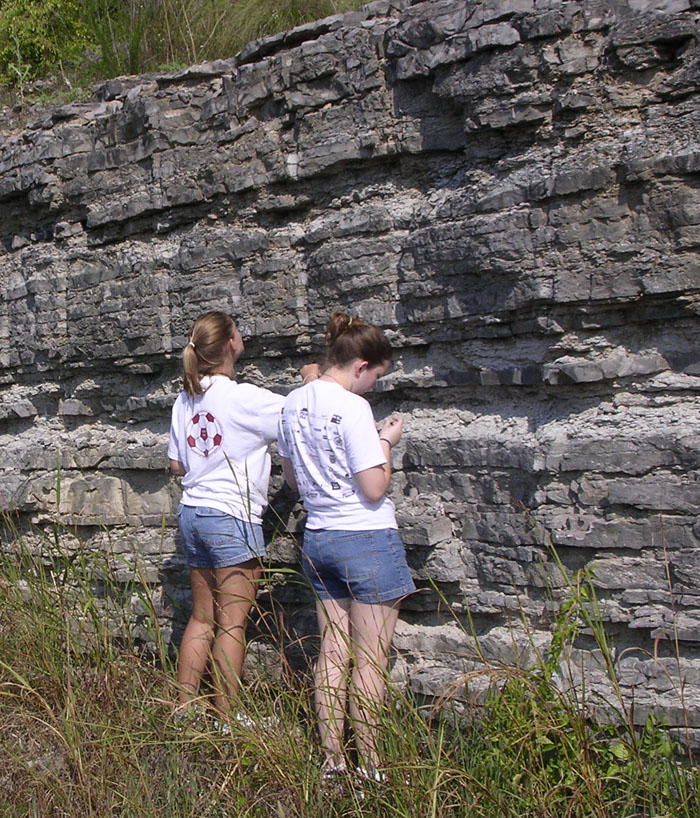
State rocks - limestone

The Tennessee General Assembly has designated two different types of sedimentary rock as official state rocks.

The agate was designated as the state's first official rock in 1969. A form of cryptocrystalline quartz (chalcedony) that is regarded as a semiprecious gemstone, agate is found in several areas in the state. Collecting localities are found in Hawkins County (golden tone agate), Greene County (agatized oolites), Bedford County (carnelian, blue, ivory, pink, finely banded, dendritic, moss, iris and Fairburn style agate), and Shelby County (Lake Superior type agate and agatized corals and sponges).

Limestone, common throughout the state, was declared the official state rock in 1979. Tennessee marble, a limestone quarried in East Tennessee, is used as a building stone.

Fossil

Pterotrigonia thoracica was designated official state fossil in 1998, by the 100th General Assembly.
Rifle

The Barrett M82/M107 was designated official state rifle in February 2016 by House Joint Resolution 231.
Artifact

"Sandy", a 18.5 in (47 cm), c. 1250-1350 siltstone statue made by the Mississippian culture, depicting a kneeling man. Excavated from the Sellars Farm site, the artifact was designated the official state artifact in 2014 by House Bill No. 2443, and is on display at the McClung Museum of Natural History and Culture.

== Books ==
In 2024, ten literary works with varying degrees of connection to the Volunteer State were designated as official Tennessee state books:

- "Farewell Address to the American People" written by George Washington (1796)
- "Democracy in America", written by Alexis de Tocqueville (1835 and 1840)
- Aitken Bible (1782)
- Papers of president Andrew Jackson
- "Roots", written by Alex Haley (1977)
- "A Death in the Family", written by James Agee (1958)
- "All the King's Men", written by Robert Penn Warren (1947)
- "American Lion", written by Jon Meacham (2009)
- "The Civil War: A Narrative", written by Shelby Foote (1958–1974)
- "Coat of Many Colors", written by Dolly Parton (2016)

== Songs ==
In 2003, a resolution of the 103rd General Assembly designated songwriting as an official state art form. In keeping with this designation, Tennessee has sixteen official state songs:

=== Official state songs ===
Title	Writer(s)	Year adopted	Notes	Ref
"My Homeland, Tennessee"	Nell Grayson Taylor (words), Roy Lamont Smith (music)	1925		
"When It's Iris Time in Tennessee"	Willa Waid Newman	1935		
"My Tennessee"	Frances Hannah Tranum	1955	Adopted as the state's official public school song. Designated as a state song in 1931, but not added officially to the code until 1955.	
"Tennessee Waltz"	Redd Stewart, Pee Wee King	1965		
"Rocky Top"	Felice and Boudleaux Bryant	1982		
"The Pride of Tennessee"	Fred Congdon, Thomas Vaughn, Carol Elliot	1996		
"Tennessee"	John R. Bean	2011		
"Amazing Grace"	John Newton	2021		
"I'll Leave My Heart in Tennessee"	Dailey & Vincent	2022		
"My Tennessee Mountain Home"	Dolly Parton	2022		
"The Tennessee in Me"	Debbie Mathis Watts	2023		
"Copperhead Road"	Steve Earle	2023	Song about a man making moonshine and later growing marijuana in Tennessee.	
"Tennessee, Tennessee"	Wayne Jerrolds	2024		
"Under a Tennessee Moon"	Kelly Lang	2024		
"Tennessee, In My Dreams"	Makky Kaylor	2024		
"Tennessee"	Drew Holcomb	2026		

=== Other songs designated by the state ===
Title	Writer(s)	Year adopted	Notes	Ref
"Tennessee"	Vivian Rorie	1992	Designated as a state song in a resolution and listed on the state's website, but never added to the official list via an act.	
"A Tennessee Bicentennial Rap: 1796-1996"	Joan Hill Hanks	1996	Official Bicentennial Rap Hanks said it was written "to provide a fun and easy way for citizens and students to learn and retain some of [the] state's history."	
"Smoky Mountain Rain"	Kye Fleming, Dennis Morgan	2010	Was designated and recognized as the state's "eighth state song" via resolution, but no act to add it to the official list was passed.	
"Rockin' Around the Christmas Tree"	Brenda Lee	2024	Official Holiday Song Recorded in Nashville's Music Row at the Quonset Hut Studio.	

== Poem ==
A poem entitled "Oh Tennessee, My Tennessee" was designated the official state poem by the 88th General Assembly in 1973. The poem was written by U.S. Navy Admiral William P. Lawrence while in solitary confinement in a prisoner of war camp in North Vietnam.

== Folk dance ==
In 1980 the General Assembly designated the square dance as the state's official state folk dance, which it described as "a uniquely attractive art form that remains a vibrant and entertaining part of Tennessee folklore."

== See also ==
- Lists of United States state symbols
- Tennessine - an element named for the state
