= Tennessee (Vivian Rorie song) =

"Tennessee" is one of at least 15 official state songs of the U.S. state of Tennessee, written by 15-year-old Vivian Rorie. It was officially adopted by the Tennessee Senate on April 6, 1992.

The song's lyrics praise Tennessee's natural beauty and music heritage, with specific mention of the Grand Ole Opry. Vivian Rorie wrote "Tennessee" 55 years before it became an official Tennessee state symbol. At the time of its adoption she was a retired nurse and Sunday school teacher. The song was first performed in by the choir of Northeast High School, where a daughter of Vivian Rorie was a teacher.

When ratified in 1992, "Tennessee" became the state's sixth official song, and prompted an hour-long discussion among lawmakers about classifications of state songs. This led to tensions, and was referenced in later news reports about an outbreak of lewd pranks between lawmakers, who reportedly snuck sexual items like lacy lingerie and a condom into other lawmakers' pockets.

== History of Tennessee state songs ==
In 1925, Tennessee designated "My Homeland, Tennessee" as its first state song, written by Chattanoogans Nell Grayson Taylor and Roy Lamont Smith who won a song contest. Several years later, the senate ratified "When It's Iris Time in Tennessee" by Willa Waid Newman as the state song, sparking outrage and protest from Chattanoogans who did not want it to replace "My Homeland, Tennessee". Lawmakers reported that they had simply forgotten that the state already had an official song. The second song was eventually adopted in 1935, though its tune was virtually forgotten in the 1960s until a Tennessee resident launched a public search for the music. In 1955, "My Tennessee" by Frances Hannah Tranum was added. In 1965, lawmakers approved "Tennessee Waltz" by Redd Stewert and Pee Wee King as state song. In 1982, "Rocky Top" by Boudleaux and Felice Bryant was approved in a 97-0 vote, and there was a celebration on the senate floor with a rousing “Rocky Top” performance by the Osborne Brothers accompanied by guitar, banjo, mandolin, fiddle, and an encore chorus—causing lawmakers and audience members to erupt into clapping, shouts, and a standing ovation. Several days prior, the lawmakers had waged a multi-day argument over whether to designate corn or soybeans as the state vegetable; they eventually learned that that neither was a vegetable and shelved the bill.

Since the 1992 ratification of "Tennessee" by Vivian Rorie, at least 9 additional state songs have been approved, including "Tennessee Bicentennial Rap" (adopted 1996) by Joan Hill Hanks, "The Pride of Tennessee" (adopted 1996), "Smoky Mountain Rain" by Ronnie Milsap (adopted 2010), "Tennessee" by John R. Bear (adopted 2012), "Amazing Grace" (adopted 2021), "Copperhead Road" by Steve Earle (adopted 2023), "My Tennessee Mountain Home" by Dolly Parton, "Tennessee, In My Dreams" by Makky Kaylor (adopted July 2024), and "Tennessee" by Drew and Ellie Holcomb (adopted 2026).
