= Vehicle registration plates of Tennessee =

Vehicle license plates in Tennessee, United States

Tennessee
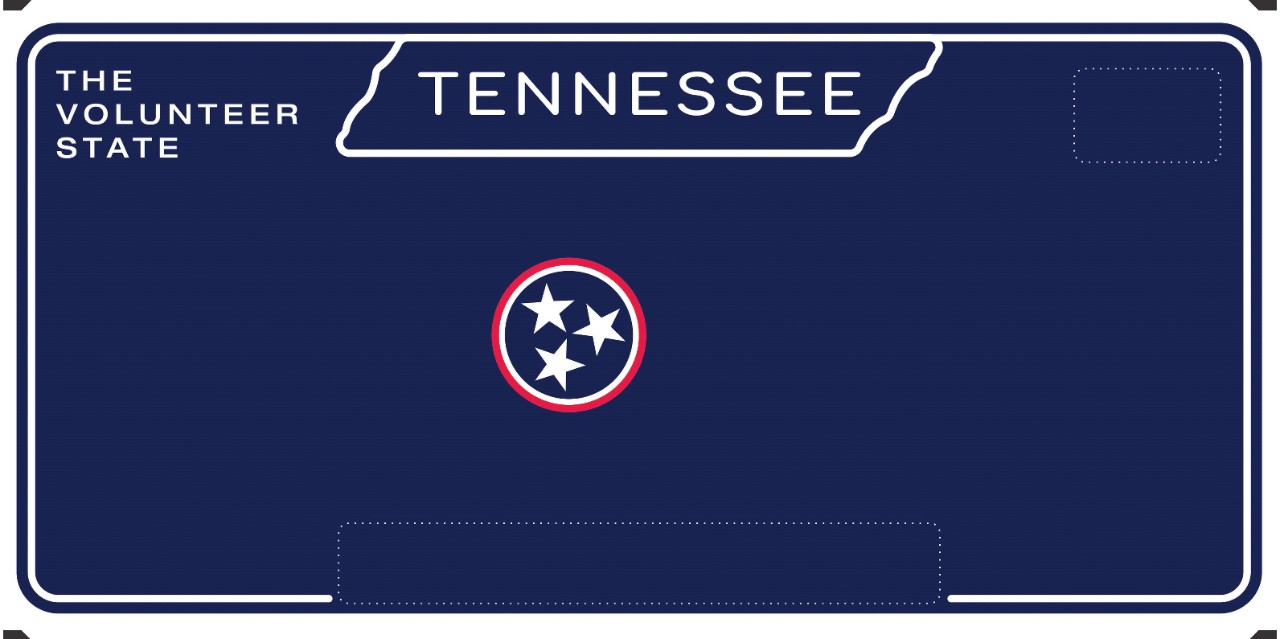

Current series
- Slogan: The Volunteer State; Optional: In God We Trust
- Size: 12 in × 6 in 30 cm × 15 cm
- Material: Aluminum
- Serial format: ABC-1234 (Standard); 123-ABCD (Standard- In God We Trust)
- Introduced: January 1, 2022; revised November 16, 2023

Availability
- Issued by: Tennessee Department of Revenue, Vehicle Services Division

History
- First issued: July 1, 1915 (pre-state plates from 1905 through June 30, 1915)

The U.S. state of Tennessee first required its residents to register their motor vehicles in 1905. Registrants provided their own license plates for display until 1915, when the state began to issue plates.

As of 2026, plates are issued by the Tennessee Department of Revenue through its Vehicle Services Division. Only rear plates have been required since 1977.

== Passenger baseplates ==
=== 1915 to 1961 ===
In 1956, the United States, Canada, and Mexico came to an agreement with the American Association of Motor Vehicle Administrators, the Automobile Manufacturers Association and the National Safety Council that standardized the size for license plates for vehicles (except those for motorcycles) at 6 inches (15 cm) in height by 12 inches (30 cm) in width, with standardized mounting holes. The 1956 (dated 1957) issue was the first Tennessee license plate that complied with these standards, following a 21-year period where the plates were roughly the shape of the state of Tennessee.

No slogans were used on passenger plates during the period covered by this subsection.

Image	Dates issued	Design	Serial format	Serials issued	Notes
	1915	Embossed white serial on dark blue plate; vertical "1915" and "TENN" at left and right respectively; "EXPIRES DEC 31, 1915" at bottom	12345	23001 to approximately 27000	Issued only to new registrants from July 1 through December 31, 1915, with serials following on from those on pre-state-issued plates.
	1916	Embossed black serial on cream plate; vertical "1916" and "TENN" at left and right respectively; "EXPIRES DEC 31" at bottom	12345	6001 to approximately 37000	
	1917	Embossed white serial on black plate with border line; vertical "1917" and "TENN" at left and right respectively	12345	6001 to approximately 54000	
	1918	Embossed black serial on light green plate with border line; vertical "TENN" and "1918" at left and right respectively	12345	6001 to approximately 69000	
	1919	Embossed white serial on dark blue plate with border line; vertical "TENN" and "1919" at left and right respectively	12345	6001 to approximately 87000	
	1920	Embossed black serial on gray plate with border line; vertical "TENN" and "1920" at left and right respectively	12345	6001 to approximately 95000	
	1921	Embossed black serial on orange plate with border line; vertical "TENN" and "1921" at left at right respectively	12345	1 to approximately 94000	
	1922	Embossed white serial on dark green plate with border line; vertical "TENN" and "1922" at left and right respectively	123456	25001 to approximately 148000	
	1923	Embossed dark blue serial on gray plate with border line; vertical "TENN" and "1923" at left and right respectively	123456	25001 to approximately 179000	
	1924	Embossed black serial on yellow plate with border line; vertical "TENN" at left and "1924" centered at bottom	123-456	25-001 to approximately 205-000	
	1925	Embossed white serial on maroon plate with border line; "TENN. 25" at bottom	123-456	25-001 to approximately 240-000	
	1926	Embossed white serial on black plate with border line; vertical "FRONT" or "REAR" used as separator; "TENN 1926" at bottom	123-456	100-001 to approximately 349-000	
	1927	Embossed white serial within state outline on lavender plate; vertical "FRONT" or "REAR" used as separator; "TENN" at top right and "27" at bottom right	123-456	50-001 to approximately 326-000	First base to feature the state shape in any form.
	1928	Embossed white serial on black plate with border line; vertical "FRONT" or "REAR" used as separator; "TENN 1928" at right	123-456	50-001 to approximately 348-000	
	1929	Embossed white serial on green plate with border line; "TENN 1929" at left	123-456	2-001 to approximately 323-000	
	1930	Embossed dark blue serial on silver plate with border line; vertical "TENN" used as separator; vertical "1930" at right	123-456	50-001 to approximately 405-000	
	1931	Embossed yellow serial on black plate with border line; vertical "1931" used as separator; vertical "TENN" at right	123-456	15-001 to approximately 367-000	
	1932	Embossed white serial on black plate with border line; vertical "TENN" and "32" at right	123-456	10-001 to approximately 347-000	
	1933	Embossed cream serial on brown plate with border line; "33" and vertical "TENN" at right	123-456	10-001 to approximately 359-000	
	1934	Embossed white serial on medium blue plate with border line; "34" and vertical "TENN" used as separator	123-456	10-001 to approximately 309-000	
	1935	Embossed white serial on black plate with border line; "35" and vertical "TENN" at left	123-456	10-001 to approximately 332-000	
	1936	Embossed blue serial on silver state-shaped plate with border line; "TENNESSEE 1936" at top	123-456	10-001 to approximately 343-000	First use of the full state name.
	1937	Embossed black serial on yellow state-shaped plate with border line; "TENN. 1937" at bottom	C123-456	C30-001 to approximately C371-000	Weight classes introduced, with C used for vehicles weighing 3,500 lb or less, and D for vehicles above 3,500 lb.
	1937	Embossed black serial on yellow state-shaped plate with border line; "TENN. 1937" at bottom	D12-345	D4-000 to approximately D11-500	Weight classes introduced, with C used for vehicles weighing 3,500 lb or less, and D for vehicles above 3,500 lb.
	1938	Embossed blue serial on silver state-shaped plate with border line; "TENN. 38" at bottom	123 456	100 001 to approximately 443 000	Weight classes same as 1937, but with no letter used for vehicles weighing 3,500 lb or less.
	1938	Embossed blue serial on silver state-shaped plate with border line; "TENN. 38" at bottom	D12 345	D85 001 to approximately D95 000	Weight classes same as 1937, but with no letter used for vehicles weighing 3,500 lb or less.
	1939	Embossed red serial on silver state-shaped plate with border line; "1939 TENN." at bottom	1-12345; 10-1234; 1D-1234; 10D-123	Coded by county of issuance (1 or 10)	County coding introduced. Weight classes remained in use until 1957, with D continuing to be used for vehicles weighing more than 3,500 lb.
	1940	Embossed orange serial on black state-shaped plate with border line; "TENN. 40" at bottom	1-12345; 10-1234; 1D-1234; 10D-123	Coded by county of issuance (1 or 10)	
	1941	Embossed white serial on black state-shaped plate with border line; "1941 TENN." at bottom	1-12345; 10-1234; 1D-1234; 10D-123	Coded by county of issuance (1 or 10)	
	1942–43	Embossed black serial on white state-shaped plate with border line; "TENN. 42" at bottom	1-12345; 10-1234; 1D-1234; 10D-123	Coded by county of issuance (1 or 10)	Revalidated for 1943 with black tabs, due to metal conservation for World War II.
	1944	Embossed white serial on black state-shaped plate with border line; "TENN. 44" at bottom	1-12345; 10-1234; 1D-1234; 10D-123	Coded by county of issuance (1 or 10)	
	1945	Embossed blue serial on silver state-shaped plate with border line; "TENN. 1945" at bottom	1-12345; 10-1234; 1D-1234; 10D-123	Coded by county of issuance (1 or 10)	
	1946	Embossed green serial on silver state-shaped plate with border line; "TENN. 46" at bottom	1-12345; 10-1234; 1D-1234; 10D-123	Coded by county of issuance (1 or 10)	
	1947	Embossed white serial on black state-shaped plate with border line; "1947 TENN." at bottom	1-12345; 10-1234; 1D-1234; 10D-123	Coded by county of issuance (1 or 10)	
	1948	Embossed black serial on yellow state-shaped plate with border line; "TENN. 48" at bottom	1-12345; 10-1234; 1D-1234; 10D-123	Coded by county of issuance (1 or 10)	
	1949	Embossed yellow serial on black state-shaped plate with border line; "1949 TENN." at bottom	1-12345; 10-1234; 1D-1234; 10D-123	Coded by county of issuance (1 or 10)	
	1950	Embossed black serial on silver state-shaped plate with border line; "TENN. 50" at bottom	1-12345; 10-1234; 1D-1234; 10D-123	Coded by county of issuance (1 or 10)	
	1951	Embossed white serial on orange state-shaped plate with border line; "51 TENN." at bottom	1-12345; 10-1234; 1D-1234; 10D-123	Coded by county of issuance (1 or 10)	Issued in the colors of the University of Tennessee.
	1952	Embossed black serial on white state-shaped plate with border line; "TENN. 52" at bottom	1-12345; 10-1234; 1D-1234; 10D-123	Coded by county of issuance (1 or 10)	
	1953	Embossed blue serial on silver state-shaped plate with border line; "53 TENN." at bottom	1-12345; 10-1234; 1D-1234; 10D-123	Coded by county of issuance (1 or 10)	
	1954	Embossed yellow serial on black state-shaped plate with border line; "TENN. 54" at bottom	1-12345; 10-1234; 1D-1234; 10D-123	Coded by county of issuance (1 or 10)	
	1955	Embossed red serial on white state-shaped plate with border line; "55 TENN." at bottom	1-12345; 10-1234; 1D-1234; 10D-123	Coded by county of issuance (1 or 10)	
	1956	Embossed white serial on dark blue state-shaped plate with border line; "TENN. 56" at bottom	1-12345; 10-1234; 1D-1234; 10D-123	Coded by county of issuance (1 or 10)	
	1957	Embossed white serial within state outline on black plate with border line; "TENN. 57" centered at bottom	1/A 1234; 10/ 1234; 10/A 1234	Coded by county of issuance (1 or 10)	First 6" x 12" plate.
	1958	Embossed black serial on white plate with border line; "TENN" within state outline centered at top; "19" at top left and "58" at top right	1A-12-34; 10-A1-23	Coded by county of issuance (1 or 10)	
	1959	Embossed white serial on black plate with border line; "TENN" within state outline centered at top; "59" at top left	1A-1234; 10-1234; 10-A123	Coded by county of issuance (1 or 10)	
	1960	Embossed black serial on white plate with border line; "TENN" within state outline centered at top; "60" at top right	1A-1234; 10-1234; 10-A123	Coded by county of issuance (1 or 10)	
	1961	Embossed white serial on black plate with border line; "TENN" within state outline centered at top; "61" at top left	1A-1234; 10-1234; 10-A123	Coded by county of issuance (1 or 10)	

=== 1962 to present ===
Image	Dates issued	Design	Slogan	Serial format	Serials issued	Notes
	1962–65	Embossed black serial on white plate with border line; "TENN" within state outline centered at top; "62" at top right	none	1-1234; 1A-1234; 1AB-123; 10-1234; 10-A123; 10-AB12	Coded by county of issuance (1 or 10)	Revalidated for 1963, 1964 and 1965 with stickers.
	1966–70	Embossed black serial on white plate with border line; "TENN" within state outline centered at top; county name on sticker centered at bottom, cutting off border line	none	AB-1234	AA-0001 to TZ-9999	
	1971–75	As 1966–70 base, but with full border line around plate and no county-name sticker	none	1-A1234; 1-AB123; 10-A123; 10-AB12	Coded by county of issuance (1 or 10)	
	1971–75	As 1966–70 base, but with full border line around plate and no county-name sticker	none	ABC-123	AAA-001 to approximately ANA-999	Supplemental plates issued in counties that had exhausted their allocations of county-code plates.
AAA000 format 1976-82	1976–82	Embossed dark blue serial on reflective white plate; pale yellow state seal screened in the center behind serial; blue banner graphic screened at top containing "TENNESSEE" in white in the center	"Volunteer State" screened in blue centered at bottom	1-A1234; 1-AB123; 10-A123; 10-AB12	Coded by county of issuance (1 or 10)	First base not to feature the state shape since 1935, and first to use the full state name since 1936. Monthly staggered registration introduced. Some plates manufactured in Texas using that state's serial dies (pictured).
AAA000 format 1976-82	1976–82	Embossed dark blue serial on reflective white plate; pale yellow state seal screened in the center behind serial; blue banner graphic screened at top containing "TENNESSEE" in white in the center	"Volunteer State" screened in blue centered at bottom	ABC-123	AAA-001 to approximately BPA-999	Supplemental plates issued in counties that had exhausted their allocations of county-code plates.
	1983 – December 1987	Embossed blue serial on reflective white plate; "Tennessee" screened in green centered at top	"Volunteer State" screened in green centered at bottom, surrounded by green state outline	1-A1B23; 1-ABC12; 10-1A23; 10-12A3; 10-123A; 10-12AB	Coded by county of issuance (1 or 10)	
	1983 – December 1987	Embossed blue serial on reflective white plate; "Tennessee" screened in green centered at top	"Volunteer State" screened in green centered at bottom, surrounded by green state outline	ABC-123	BRK-001 to approximately CZS-999	Supplemental plates issued in counties that had exhausted their allocations of county-code plates.
	January 1988 – December 1993	Embossed red serial on reflective white plate; blue circle with three white stars (from the state flag) screened in the center; "Tennessee" screened in blue centered at top; county name on blue sticker centered at bottom	none	ABC 123	ABB 001 to ZZZ 999 (see right)	Serials began at DBB 001 and ran to ZZZ 999, followed by BBB 001 through CZZ 999; vowels and Y were not used until 1993, when Y and then A were used as the first letter (the last serial issued was in the APP series).
	January 1994 – December 1999	Embossed red serial on reflective white plate; Tennessee State Capitol screened in blue in the center; "BicenTENNial" screened in red and blue at top, offset to left ("TENN" in blue); "1796" and "1996" screened in blue to the right; county name on blue sticker centered at bottom	"VOLUNTEER STATE" screened in red centered between "BicenTENNial" and serial	123 ABC	001 ABB to 999 ZZZ (see right)	Commemorated Tennessee's 200 years of statehood. Serials began at 001 BBB and ran to 999 ZZZ; vowels and Y were not used until 1997, when Y, A, E and U were used as the first letter in that order (the last serial issued was in the UKX series).
	January 2000 – December 2005	Embossed black serial on reflective white plate; gold rising sun over green state shape screened in the center; "TENNESSEE" screened in blue centered at top; county name on white sticker centered at bottom	"Sounds good to me" and "Volunteer State" screened in black centered above and below serial respectively	ABC 123	AAA 001 to approximately TPZ 999	Early plates used a darker shade of green for the state shape; this was changed to a lighter shade in late 2000 in response to visibility concerns. Letters I and O not used in serials.
	January 2006 – February 2011	Screened black serial with state-shaped separator on reflective graphic plate with white sky and green rolling hills; "Tennessee" screened in black centered above serial; county name on white sticker centered at bottom	"The Volunteer State" screened in dark green above state name, offset to right	123-ABC	001-BBB to 999-ZZZ	Vowels not used in the 123-ABC, ABC-123 serial formats. I, O and Q not used in the A12-34B, 1A2-3B4 and 12A-B34 formats. In spring 2020, some plates were manufactured at the Wynne License Plate Plant in Texas using a darker shade of green after a tornado damaged Tennessee's license plate manufacturing facility.
	February 2011 – April; 2016	Screened black serial with state-shaped separator on reflective graphic plate with white sky and green rolling hills; "Tennessee" screened in black centered above serial; county name on white sticker centered at bottom	As above, plus "www.tnvacation.com" screened in black between serial and county sticker	A12-34B	A00-01A to Z99-99Z	Vowels not used in the 123-ABC, ABC-123 serial formats. I, O and Q not used in the A12-34B, 1A2-3B4 and 12A-B34 formats. In spring 2020, some plates were manufactured at the Wynne License Plate Plant in Texas using a darker shade of green after a tornado damaged Tennessee's license plate manufacturing facility.
	April 2016 – June; 2021	Screened black serial with state-shaped separator on reflective graphic plate with white sky and green rolling hills; "Tennessee" screened in black centered above serial; county name on white sticker centered at bottom	As above, plus "www.tnvacation.com" screened in black between serial and county sticker	1A2-3B4	0A0-0A1 to 9Z9-9Z9	Vowels not used in the 123-ABC, ABC-123 serial formats. I, O and Q not used in the A12-34B, 1A2-3B4 and 12A-B34 formats. In spring 2020, some plates were manufactured at the Wynne License Plate Plant in Texas using a darker shade of green after a tornado damaged Tennessee's license plate manufacturing facility.
	June 2021 – December 31, 2021	Screened black serial with state-shaped separator on reflective graphic plate with white sky and green rolling hills; "Tennessee" screened in black centered above serial; county name on white sticker centered at bottom	As above, plus "www.tnvacation.com" screened in black between serial and county sticker	12A-B34	00A-A01 to 65B-J90	Vowels not used in the 123-ABC, ABC-123 serial formats. I, O and Q not used in the A12-34B, 1A2-3B4 and 12A-B34 formats. In spring 2020, some plates were manufactured at the Wynne License Plate Plant in Texas using a darker shade of green after a tornado damaged Tennessee's license plate manufacturing facility.
	July 1, 2017 – December 31, 2021	Screened black serial with state-shaped separator on reflective graphic plate with white sky and green rolling hills; "Tennessee" screened in black centered above serial; county name on white sticker centered at bottom	As above, plus "In God We Trust" screened in green above and below separator	ABC-123	BBB-001 to DXX-700	Vowels not used in the 123-ABC, ABC-123 serial formats. I, O and Q not used in the A12-34B, 1A2-3B4 and 12A-B34 formats. In spring 2020, some plates were manufactured at the Wynne License Plate Plant in Texas using a darker shade of green after a tornado damaged Tennessee's license plate manufacturing facility.
	January 1, 2022 – November 15, 2023	Screened white serial on reflective blue plate with flag emblem as separator; "TENNESSEE" screened in white inside an outlined state map, centered at top; county name on white sticker centered at bottom	"THE VOLUNTEER STATE" screened on the top left corner, to the left of the state map; "TNVACATION.COM" screened in white between serial and county sticker	ABC-1234	BBB-0001 to BRC-2189	Plate design chosen by online vote.
2022 Tennessee "In God We Trust" license plate	January 1, 2022 – November 15, 2023	Screened white serial on reflective blue plate with flag emblem as separator; "TENNESSEE" screened in white inside an outlined state map, centered at top; county name on white sticker centered at bottom	As above, plus "In God We Trust" in the center curved around the state's unofficial logo emblem; "TNVACATION.COM" screened in white between serial and county sticker	123-ABCD	001-BBBB to 999-BMDM	Plate design chosen by online vote.
	November 16, 2023 – present	Screened white serial on reflective blue plate with flag emblem as separator; "TENNESSEE" screened in white inside an outlined state map, centered at top; county name on white sticker centered at bottom	"THE VOLUNTEER STATE" screened on the top left corner, to the left of the state map	ABC-1234	BRC-8001 to BVP-2252 (as of December 20, 2025)	The changes remove the words www.tnvacation.com from both the standard and In God We Trust license plates. For the In God We Trust plate option, the words “In God We Trust” is located where www.tnvacation.com previously appeared. BRC-2190 to BRC-8000 were not issued.
	November 16, 2023 – present	Screened white serial on reflective blue plate with flag emblem as separator; "TENNESSEE" screened in white inside an outlined state map, centered at top; county name on white sticker centered at bottom	As above, plus "IN GOD WE TRUST" screened in white between serial and county sticker	123- ABCD	001-BMDN to 490-BRZC (as of July 23, 2026)	The changes remove the words www.tnvacation.com from both the standard and In God We Trust license plates. For the In God We Trust plate option, the words “In God We Trust” is located where www.tnvacation.com previously appeared. BRC-2190 to BRC-8000 were not issued.

== County coding ==
From 1939 through 1965 and from 1971 through 1988, Tennessee license plates began with a one- or two-digit county code. The order of the codes was based on the respective populations of each county.

The codes remained constant from 1939 through 1965, then were re-allocated according to population shifts in 1971, 1976 and 1983.

County	1939–65	1971–76	1976–83	1983–88
Anderson	29	8	10	13
Bedford	25	42	38	44
Benton	71	75	71	70
Bledsoe	88	84	83	82
Blount	10	9	8	10
Bradley	19	17	13	12
Campbell	31	27	35	28
Cannon	80	80	80	80
Carroll	35	38	36	43
Carter	21	15	17	18
Cheatham	68	78	66	55
Chester	61	77	77	77
Claiborne	49	51	52	48
Clay	92	86	87	86
Cocke	46	40	37	38
Coffee	41	24	25	26
Crockett	62	62	62	68
Cumberland	58	50	48	40
Davidson	1	2	2	2
Decatur	83	82	78	79
DeKalb	66	73	75	76
Dickson	39	52	47	37
Dyer	18	22	26	29
Fayette	48	33	44	46
Fentress	72	64	67	71
Franklin	37	31	33	35
Gibson	13	12	14	19
Giles	24	44	46	47
Grainger	70	65	63	62
Greene	12	13	15	16
Grundy	82	71	76	73
Hamblen	27	20	19	20
Hamilton	4	4	4	4
Hancock	87	85	86	89
Hardeman	52	47	45	52
Hardin	56	54	54	54
Hawkins	43	21	24	23
Haywood	47	39	51	57
Henderson	57	56	56	56
Henry	26	45	42	41
Hickman	67	70	72	67
Houston	90	92	89	90
Humphreys	74	72	65	65
Jackson	81	79	81	83
Jefferson	44	48	39	36
Johnson	73	74	74	74
Knox	3	3	3	3
Lake	76	76	82	87
Lauderdale	42	46	50	49
Lawrence	36	26	29	30
Lewis	85	87	85	81
Lincoln	28	36	40	45
Loudon	40	37	41	42
Macon	65	66	70	66
Madison	7	7	7	11
Marion	54	49	49	50
Marshall	32	55	55	58
Maury	9	14	16	17
McMinn	23	19	22	24
McNairy	50	53	53	53
Meigs	89	90	91	88
Monroe	51	41	43	39
Montgomery	11	10	9	9
Moore	91	95	95	94
Morgan	69	63	64	63
Obion	17	30	27	33
Overton	77	61	60	61
Perry	86	89	90	92
Pickett	94	93	93	95
Polk	63	67	73	75
Putnam	34	23	21	22
Rhea	53	57	57	51
Roane	33	16	18	21
Robertson	15	29	28	27
Rutherford	8	11	11	8
Scott	75	59	61	60
Sequatchie	93	88	88	85
Sevier	38	34	31	25
Shelby	2	1	1	1
Smith	55	68	68	69
Stewart	79	83	84	84
Sullivan	5	5	5	5
Sumner	14	18	12	7
Tipton	30	25	32	31
Trousdale	84	91	92	91
Unicoi	59	60	59	64
Union	78	81	79	78
Van Buren	95	94	94	93
Warren	45	43	34	34
Washington	6	6	6	6
Wayne	64	69	69	72
Weakley	22	35	30	32
White	60	58	58	59
Williamson	20	32	23	14
Wilson	16	28	20	15

== Optional plates ==
Tennessee offers over 200 optional license plates. Most can be personalized for an additional fee.

Image	Type	First issued	Design	Serial format/s	Notes
	Ducks Unlimited		Embossed black on white; "TENNESSEE" screened in green at top; green Ducks Unlimited logo at left; green bar at bottom containing "Ducks Unlimited" in white	D/U1234; 1234D/U; 1D/U234	
	The Equity Alliance	Fall 2022	Screened white on black; "TENNESSEE" screened in white at top, "THE EQUITY ALLIANCE" screened in gray at bottom.	A/J1234	Introduced as Tennessee's first all black specialty plate
	Explore TN	March 2023	Screened white on black; "TENNESSEE" screened in white at top, "explore tn" screened in white at bottom. Off-road vehicle and mountains screened on left.	A/Q1234; 1A/Q234	
	Freemasonry		Screened black on white; "TENNESSEE" screened in blue at top; blue square containing yellow Square and Compasses at left; blue bar at bottom containing "MASON" in yellow	M/L1234 1M/L234	
	Isaiah 117 House	April 2023	Screened black on white; "TENNESSEE" screened in black at top; Isaiah 117 house screened on left; "Isaiah 117" screened at bottom.	A/X1234	
	Millennial Debt Foundation	October 2022	Screened white on black; "TENNESSEE" screened in white inside an outlined state map, centered at top; "IN THE BLACK" screened at bottom in silver	A/I1234; 1A/I234; 12A/I34; 123A/I4; 1234A/I; I/A1234; 1I/A234; 12I/A34; 123I/A4; 1234I/A; A/I12345	
	Sons of Confederate Veterans	2004	Screened black on white; "TENNESSEE" screened in red at top; Confederate flag screened on left; "SONS OF THE CONFEDERATE VETERANS" screened in red at bottom	C/V1234 1234C/V	
Tennessee Arts Commission
	Cool Cat	1995	Originally embossed black serial on white, blue, and lavender background, now screened. "Tennessee" screened in white at top, bespectacled cat playing saxophone at left, with "ARTS" at bottom in blue.	A1234 A/C1234 1234A/C 12A/C34	Artwork by Norris Hall
	Fish	1995	Originally embossed black serial, now screened. "Tennessee" screened in blue at top with fish background.	F1234 A/F1234 1234A/F 12A/F34	Artwork by Norris Hall
Environment & Conservation
	Appalachian Trail Conservancy	2010	Serial screened black on blue sky background. "TENNESSEE" screened in black at top, "appalachiantrail.org" screened in green at bottom on mountains screened transparently in background.	A/T1234; 1A/T234	Appalachian Trail Conservancy plates
	State Parks	1993	Embossed black serial on white plate. "Tennessee State Parks" screened at top in green with purple wildflowers screened in background.	EV12345	Font used for "Tennessee" script same as the one used on roadside state border sign. Sample at left also carries curious single month-year validation sticker, seen only in 1994 and only on select plates.
	State Parks	2000	Serial screened black on white/light blue. "TENNESSEE" screened in light blue at top. "STATE PARKS" screened in blue at bottom. Purple flowers screened in background.	E/V1234 1234E/V 1E/V234 12E/V34 123E/V4 E1234V	
	Great Smoky Mountains National Park	1997	Originally embossed black serial on purple and orange graphic of mountains and sunrise, now screened. "TENNESSEE" screened at top. "Friends of Great Smoky Mountains" screened at left. "Preserve & Protect our National Park" screened at bottom.	1234; A123; 123A; N/P1234; 1234N/P; 1N/P234; 12N/P34; 123N/P4; N/PA123	
	Great Smoky Mountains National Park	2018	Screened black serial on purple and orange graphic of mountains and sunrise. Silhouette of bear standing on ledge at left. "Tennessee" screened at top. Stylized "FRIENDS OF THE SMOKIES" at bottom.	N/PA123; 1N/PA23; 12N/PA3	Updated design introduced in 2018.
Collegiate
Tennessee University of Alabama plate	University of Alabama		Serial screened black on white; "TENNESSEE" screened in white at top, "THE UNIVERSITY OF ALABAMA" screened in white at bottom, Alabama capital A logo screened on left.	A/L1234 1234A/L 12A/L34	
	University of Arkansas		Serial screened black on white; "TENNESSEE" screened in black at top, "University of Arkansas" screened in red at bottom, Arkansas Razorback logo screened on left.	U/A1234 1234U/A	
	Auburn University		Serial screened black on white; "TENNESSEE" screened in black at top, "Auburn University" screened in navy with orange outline at bottom, A/U logo screened on left.	1234A/U A/U1234	
	Austin Peay State University		Serial screened black on white; "TENNESSEE" screened in white at top, "Austin Peay State University" screened in white at bottom, A/P logo screened on left.	A/P1234	
	Belmont University		Serial screened black on white; "TENNESSEE" screened in white at top, "Belmont University" screened in white at bottom, Belmont University logo screened in black on left.	B/U1234	
	Carson–Newman University		Serial screened black on orange; "TENNESSEE" screened in white at top, "CARSON-NEWMAN" screened in white at bottom, Carson Newman Eagle logo screened on left.	C/U1234	
	Christian Brothers University		Serial screened black on white; "TENNESSEE" screened in white at top, "CHRISTIAN BROTHERS UNIVERSITY" screened in white at bottom, CBU logo screened on left.	123C/BU	
	Clemson University		Serial screened black on white; "TENNESSEE" screened in black at top, "Clemson University" screened in black at bottom, Clemson Tiger paw screened in orange on left.	C/L1234	
	East Tennessee State University		Serial screened black on white; "TENNESSEE" screened in white at top, "EAST TENNESSEE STATE UNIVERSITY" screened in black at bottom, ETSU logo screened on left.	1234E/T	
	University of Florida		Serial screened black on white; "TENNESSEE" screened in white at top, "University of Florida" screened in white at bottom, Gator logo screened on left.	U/F1234 1234U/F	
	Florida State University		Serial screened black on gold; "TENNESSEE" screened in white at top, "FLORIDA STATE UNIVERSITY" screened in white at bottom, Seminole logo screened on left.	F/S1234	
	Freed–Hardeman University		Serial screened black on sunset sky background, "TENNESSEE" screened in maroon at top, "FREED-HARDEMAN UNIVERSITY" screened in orange at bottom, University logo screened on right.	F/H1234	
	Georgia Tech		Serial screened black on white; "TENNESSEE" screened in black at top, "Georgia Tech" screened in gold at bottom, G/T logo screened on left.	G/T1234	
	Indiana University		Serial screened black on white; "TENNESSEE" screened in black at top, "INDIANA UNIVERSITY" screened in red at bottom, I/U logo screened on left.	1234I/U	
	Jackson State University		Serial screened black on white; "TENNESSEE" screened in white at top, "THEE I LOVE" screened in white at bottom, JSU logo screened on left.	J/S123	
	University of Kentucky	1998	Serial screened black on white; "TENNESSEE" screened in black at top, "University of Kentucky" screened in blue at bottom, UK/Wildcat logo screened on right, and "UK" Memorial Hall logo screened transparently in background.	U/K1234 1234U/K	
	Lane College		Serial screened black on white; "TENNESSEE" screened in black at top, "LANE COLLEGE" screened in blue at bottom, logo screened on left.	L/A1234	
	Lee University		Serial screened black on white; "TENNESSEE" screened in white at top, "LEE UNIVERSITY" screened in blue at bottom, logo screened in between serial.	LU1234	
	LeMoyne–Owen College		Serial screened black on white; "TENNESSEE" screened in black at top, "LeMoyne-Owen College" screened in black at bottom, logo screened on left.	123L/C	
	Lipscomb University		Serial screened white on purple; "TENNESSEE" screened in white at top, "LIPSCOMB" screened in gold at bottom, Capital L logo screened in gold on left.	L/B1234	
	Maryville College		Serial screened black on white; "TENNESSEE" screened in garnet at top, "MARYVILLE COLLEGE" screened in garnet at bottom, logo screened on left.	M/V1234	
	University of Memphis	early 1990s	Serial screened black on white; "TENNESSEE" screened in white at top, "University of Memphis" screened in white at bottom, Memphis Tiger logo screened on left, and Memphis skyline screened transparently in background. (2018 redesign)	1234 T/G1234 1234T/G 1T/G123	
	Middle Tennessee State University		Serial screened black on white; "Tennessee" screened in white at top, "MIDDLE TENNESSEE STATE UNIVERSITY" screened in white at bottom, MTSU logo screened on left.	M/T1234	
	Milligan University		Serial screened black on white; "TENNESSEE" screened in black at top, "MILLIGAN UNIVERSITY" screened in white at bottom, M/U logo screened on left.		
	University of Mississippi		Serial screened black on white; "TENNESSEE" screened in blue at top, "Ole Miss" screened in red outlined in blue at bottom, logo screened on left.	U/M1234 1234U/M 12U/M34	
	Mississippi State University		Serial screened black on white; "TENNESSEE" screened in maroon at top, "MISSISSIPPI STATE UNIVERSITY" screened in maroon at bottom, logo screened on left.	M/S1234 1234M/S	
	Penn State University		Serial screened black on white; "TENNESSEE" screened in blue at top, "PENN STATE ALUMNI ASSOCIATION" screened in blue at bottom, logo screened on left.	PS123	
	Purdue University		Serial screened black on white; "TENNESSEE" screened in black at top, "PURDUE UNIVERSITY" screened in gold at bottom, logo screened on left.	P/U1234	
	Rhodes College		Serial screened black on white; "TENNESSEE" screened in white at top, "RHODES" screened in white at bottom, logo screened on left.	R/C1234	
	Sewanee: The University of the South		Serial screened black on white; "TENNESSEE" screened in black at top, "SEWANEE The University of the South" screened on left.	1S/W23	
	Tennessee State University		Serial screened black on white; "TENNESSEE" screened in black at top, TSU logo screened on left.	1234	
	Tennessee Tech University		Serial screened black on gold, "TENNESSEE" screened in black at top, "TENNESSEE TECH UNIVERSITY" screened in back on bottom, TTU logo screened on left.	T/K1234	
	Tennessee Wesleyan University		Serial screened black on white; "TENNESSEE" screened in gold at top, "TENNESSEE WESLEYAN" screened in gold on bottom, T/W logo screened on left.	T/W1234	
	Trevecca Nazarene University		Serial screened black on white; "TENNESSEE" screened in white at top, "TREVECCA NAZARENE UNIVERSITY" screened in white at bottom, T/U logo screened on left.	T/U1234	
	Tusculum University		Serial screened black on white; "TENNESSEE" screened at top in orange, "TUSCULUM UNIVERSITY" screened in black and white at bottom, T/U logo on left.	T/L123	
	University of Tennessee at Chattanooga		Serial screened black on white; "TENNESSEE" screened in white at top, "CHATTANOOGA" screened in white at bottom, Capitol C logo screened on left.	1234T/C T/C1234 12T/C34	
	University of Tennessee Health Science Center		Serial screened black on white; "TENNESSEE" screened in white at top, "THE UNIVERSITY OF TENNESSEE HEALTH SCIENCE CENTER" screened in white at bottom, UT logo above "HSC" screened on left.	1234H/S	
	UT–Knoxville		Serial screened black on orange and white; "TENNESSEE" screened at top in white, "VOLUNTEERS" screened at bottom in white. Power T logo screened on left.	1V/O234	
	UT Knoxville Alumni Program	2021	Serial screened black on white; "THE UNIVERSITY OF TENNESSEE" screened in white at top, "VOLUNTEERS" screened in white at bottom, Power T logo screened on left.		
	University of Tennessee at Martin		Serial screened black on white; "TENNESSEE" screened at top in white, "UT MARTIN" screened at bottom in orange and white, Skyhawk logo screened on left.	1234T/M	
	Union University		Serial screened black on white; "TENNESSEE" screened at top in black, "UNION UNIVERSITY" screened at bottom in black, logo and "RELIGIO ET ERUDITO" written on logo crest screened on left.	U/U1234	
	University of Tennessee- All Colleges System		Serial screened black on orange/white; "TENNESSEE" screened in black at top, "THE UNIVERSITY OF TENNESSEE" screened at bottom in black, UT logo screened on left.	A123U/T	
	Vanderbilt University		Serial screened black on gold; "Tennessee" screened in black at top, "VANDERBILT" screened at bottom in white, logo screened on left.	V/U1234 1234V/U 12V/U34	
	Virginia Tech		Serial screened black on white; "TENNESSEE" screened in black at top, "GO HOKIES" screened at bottom in maroon, logo screened on left.	V/T1234	
Professional Sports Teams
	Chattanooga FC	2022	Serial screened black on white; "TENNESSEE" screened in white at top, "CHATTANOOGA FC" screened in white at bottom, Chattanooga FC logo screened on left.	F/C1234 A/V1234	
	Memphis Grizzlies Version 1	2015	Serial screened black on white; "TENNESSEE" screened in black at top, "MEMPHIS GRIZZLIES" screened in yellow at bottom, Grizz logo screened on left.	M/G1234 1234M/G	
	Memphis Grizzlies Version 2	2018	Serial screened white on navy; "TENNESSEE" screened in Beale Street Blue at top, "MEMPHIS GRIZZLIES" screened in Beale Street Blue at bottom, Grizz logo screened on left.	M/B1234 1234M/B 12M/B34	

== Gift-A-Tag specialty plate program ==
Beginning March 4, 2015, Tennesseans were granted the ability to purchase gift vouchers to buy state specialty plates for relatives and friends. This program is no longer available, but vouchers previously purchased can be redeemed at county clerk offices.

== Non-passenger plates ==
Image	Type	First issued	Design	Serial format/s	Serials issued	Notes
	Antique Auto	2001	Embossed black on white; "TENNESSEE" and "ANTIQUE AUTO" screened at top and bottom respectively; "PERM" at top right	A/A12345	A/A00001 to approximately A/A34000	
	Antique Auto	2006	As above, but with serial screened	A/A12345	A/A34001 to A/A99999	
	Antique Auto	2011	As above, but with serial screened	12345A/A	00001A/A to 99999A/A	
	Antique Auto	2018	As above, but with serial screened	1A/A2345	0A/A0001 to present	
Tennessee disabled plate 2023	Disabled Person	January 2, 2023	"THE VOLUNTEER STATE" screened on the top left corner, to the left of the state map	P/D12345	P/D00001 to P/D99999	
	Disabled Person	March 2023	"THE VOLUNTEER STATE" screened on the top left corner, to the left of the state map	12345P/D	00001P/D to 99999P/D	
	Disabled Person	November 2023	"THE VOLUNTEER STATE" screened on the top left corner, to the left of the state map	1P/D2345	0P/D0001 to 0P/D1000 (as of December 2, 2023)	
	Disabled Person (Confined to Wheelchair)	2023	"THE VOLUNTEER STATE" screened on the top left corner, to the left of the state map	P/C00001	P/C00001 to P/C03022 (as of July 17, 2023)	
	Disabled Veteran	2019		D/V00001	DV00001 to D/V8052P ( as of June 17th 2026 )	
	Hearing Impaired	January 3, 2022	Screened white serial on reflective blue plate with flag emblem as separator; "TENNESSEE" screened in white inside an outlined state map, centered at top; county name on white sticker centered at bottom	ABC-1234	TTY-0001 to TTY-0275 (as of August 5, 2022)	
	Motorcycle	2001	Embossed black on white with border line; "TENNESSEE" screened at top; "TN" embossed at bottom	ZB1234	ZA0001 to approximately ZD9500	
	Motorcycle	2002	As above, but without embossed "TN"	ZB1234	ZD9501 to ZW9999	
	Motorcycle	2005	As above, but without embossed "TN"	1234ZB	0001ZA to 9999ZL	
Motorcycle plate	Motorcycle	2007	Screened black on white; "TENNESSEE" screened at top	1234ZB	0001ZM to 9999ZV	
Motorcycle plate	Motorcycle	2008	Screened black on white; "TENNESSEE" screened at top	1ZB234	0ZA001 to 9ZV999	
Motorcycle plate	Motorcycle	2012	Screened black on white; "TENNESSEE" screened at top	12ZB34	00ZA01 to 99ZV99	
Motorcycle plate	Motorcycle	2016	Screened black on white; "TENNESSEE" screened at top	123ZB4	000ZA1 to 999ZZ9	
Motorcycle plate	Motorcycle	2021	Screened black on white; "TENNESSEE" screened at top	K12345	K00001 to K99999	
Motorcycle plate	Motorcycle	2023	Screened black on white; "TENNESSEE" screened at top	12345K	00001K to 21037K (as of November 13, 2023)	
	Music City Bus	2001	Serial screened black on white; "TENNESSEE" screened at top	M/C12345	M/C00001 to unknown	Used on privately owned, nonapportioned entertainer coaches
	Semi-Trailer	2006	Serial screened black on white; "TENNESSEE" screened at top in blue; "SEMI" screened in blue at bottom	U123456	U000001 to U999999	
	Semi-Trailer	2019	Serial screened black on white; "TENNESSEE" screened at top in blue; "SEMI" screened in blue at bottom	123456T	000001T to 490147T (as of October 9, 2023)	

== See also ==
- Tennessee Plates
