= Flag of Tennessee =

U.S. state flag

State of Tennessee
- The Tri-Star Flag
- Use: Civil and state flag
- Proportion: 3:5
- Adopted: April 17, 1905; 121 years ago
- Design: A blue circle with three white five-pointed stars on a rectangular field of red, with a strip of white and blue on the fly.
- Designed by: Captain Le Roy Reeves

The flag of Tennessee is the official flag of the U.S. state of Tennessee. The flag displays an emblem on a field of red, with a strip of blue bordered by white on the fly. The emblem in the middle consists of three white stars on a blue circle also with a white border. The central emblem portion of the flag has been adopted as the state's unofficial logo, and appears in the logos of some Tennessee-based companies and sports teams. Examples include the First Horizon Bank and the Tennessee Titans. It is quite common, however, to mess up the aforementioned emblem. The most common of these are placing the flag upside down.

== Statute ==
The 2024 Tennessee Code, Title 4, Chapter 1, Part 3, § 4-1-301 specifies that the state flag shall be of the following design, colors and proportions:

...an oblong flag or banner in length one and two-thirds (1 2/3) times its width, the principal field of same to be of color red, but the flag or banner ending at its free or outer end in a perpendicular bar of blue, of uniform width, running from side to side, that is to say, from top to bottom of the flag or banner, and separated from the red field by a narrow margin or stripe of white of uniform width; the width of the white stripe to be one-fifth (1/5) that of the blue bar; and the total width of the bar and stripe together to be equal to one-eighth (1/8) of the width of the flag.

In the center of the red field shall be a smaller circular field of blue, separated from the surrounding red field by a circular margin or stripe of white of uniform width and of the same width as the straight margin or stripe first mentioned. The breadth or diameter of the circular blue field, exclusive of the white margin, shall be equal to one-half (1/2) of the width of the flag.

Inside the circular blue field shall be three (3) five-pointed stars of white distributed at equal intervals around a point, the center of the blue field, and of such size and arrangement that one (1) point of each star shall approach as closely as practicable without actually touching one (1) point of each of the other two (2) around the center point of the field; and the two (2) outer points of each star shall approach as nearly as practicable without actually touching the periphery of the blue field. The arrangement of the three (3) stars shall be such that the centers of no two (2) stars shall be in a line parallel to either the side or end of the flag, but intermediate between same; and the highest star shall be the one nearest the upper confined corner of the flag.

== Symbolism ==
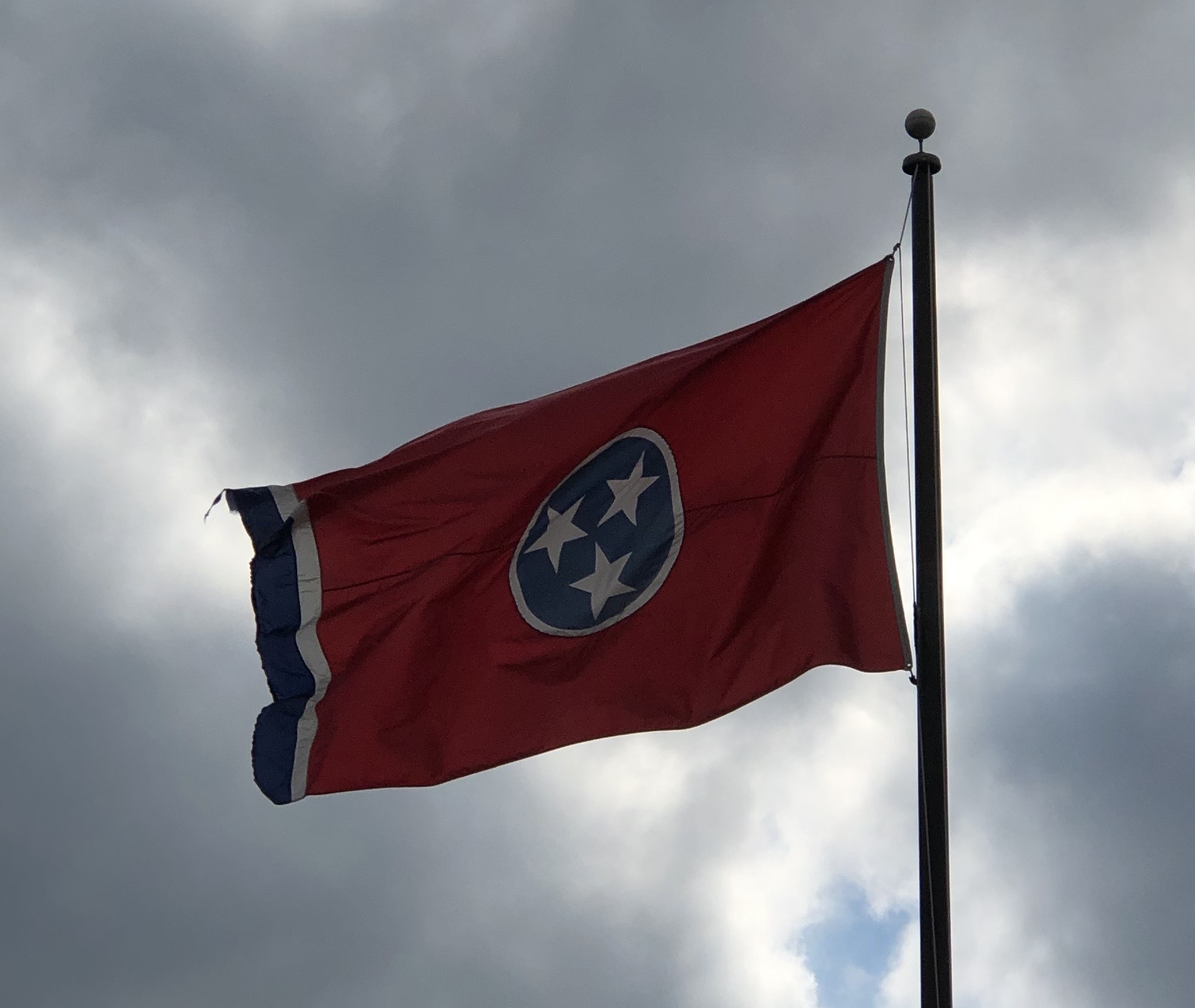
The flag of Tennessee in Nashville

The stars represent the three geographically and legally distinct Grand Divisions of Tennessee (i.e. East, Middle, and West Tennessee). The blue circle around the stars represents the unity of those grand divisions. The blue bar at the edge of the flag was just a design consideration. When asked about the blue bar, Reeves stated "The final blue bar relieves the sameness of the crimson field and prevents the flag from showing too much crimson when hanging limp."

The Tennessee state flag has been the subject of discussion regarding perceived visual similarities to Confederate symbols. Vexillologist Steven A. Knowlton has argued that the flag shares design elements with the Confederate battle flag, including white stars within a blue charge on a red field, and has noted a resemblance between the flag's vertical blue stripe and the vertical bar of the third national flag of the Confederacy. Knowlton suggested that these similarities may reflect the cultural context of Tennessee in 1905, when Lost Cause interpretations of the Civil War were widespread in the South. However, no evidence has been found that the flag's designer, Captain Le Roy Reeves, intentionally incorporated Confederate symbolism. Reeves only stated that the flag was intended to symbolize the unity of Tennessee's three Grand Divisions, and no surviving correspondence, legislative debate records, or contemporary newspaper discussions clarify whether Confederate imagery influenced the design.

In October 1917, National Geographic erroneously reported the stars represented the state as the third to enter the Union after the original thirteen.

== History ==
=== Pre-official flags (before 1897) ===
Proposed flag (1861)

Prior to the adoption of any state flag, there was a proposed Civil War era flag in 1861 for when Tennessee seceded and joined the Confederacy. While it was not officially adopted, this flag did see some limited use.

In 1883, a state flag was donated by the people of Nashville to Colonel Allison. Its design is not known.

In June of 1890, a state flag was produced in Cincinnati, it was later displayed at a banquet with Governor Taylor being in attendance. The whole thing costing $450 (Adjusted for inflation $16,028). Its design was not described.

=== 1897 flag (Tennessee Centennial Exposition) ===
Flag of Tennessee created for the 1897 Tennessee Centennial Exposition, per description

Prior to the adoption of the current state flag, an earlier design was created for and used in connection with the Tennessee Centennial Exposition of 1897. According to a description, the design featured red, white, and blue diagonal stripes to represent Tennessee's three Grand Divisions, and also included the inscription "The Volunteer State" and the number 16 referencing the state's admission to the United States as the 16th state. The design saw limited use and was not widely accepted across the state.

=== Current flag (1905–present) ===
The current state flag was designed by Captain Le Roy Reeves, a Johnson City attorney and member of the Tennessee National Guard, and was officially adopted by the Tennessee General Assembly on April 17, 1905. Reeves designed the flag to provide Tennesseans with a distinctive state symbol that could be displayed at public events and gatherings outside the state, and within the design itself aimed to represent the unity of the three Grand Divisions. No records of the legislative debates surrounding its adoption are known to exist.

In 1976, the U.S. Postal Service issued a sheet of 13 cent stamps illustrating U.S. state flags. Tennessee's was illustrated upside down.

In 2001, the North American Vexillological Association surveyed its members on the designs of the 72 U.S. state, territorial, and Canadian provincial flags and ranked the Tennessee flag 14th.

== Government flags ==
Alongside the state flag, there are other flags used by the government of Tennessee. The flag for the governor of Tennessee has been in use since 1939. It is a scarlet flag, with four stars, one in each corner, and the state military crest, a tree with three white stars, in the center. The Tennessee General Assembly has its own flag as well that was adopted in 1978.

Flag of the governor (adopted 1939)

Flag of the General Assembly (adopted 1978)

== Gallery ==
Tennessee centennial flag (1896)

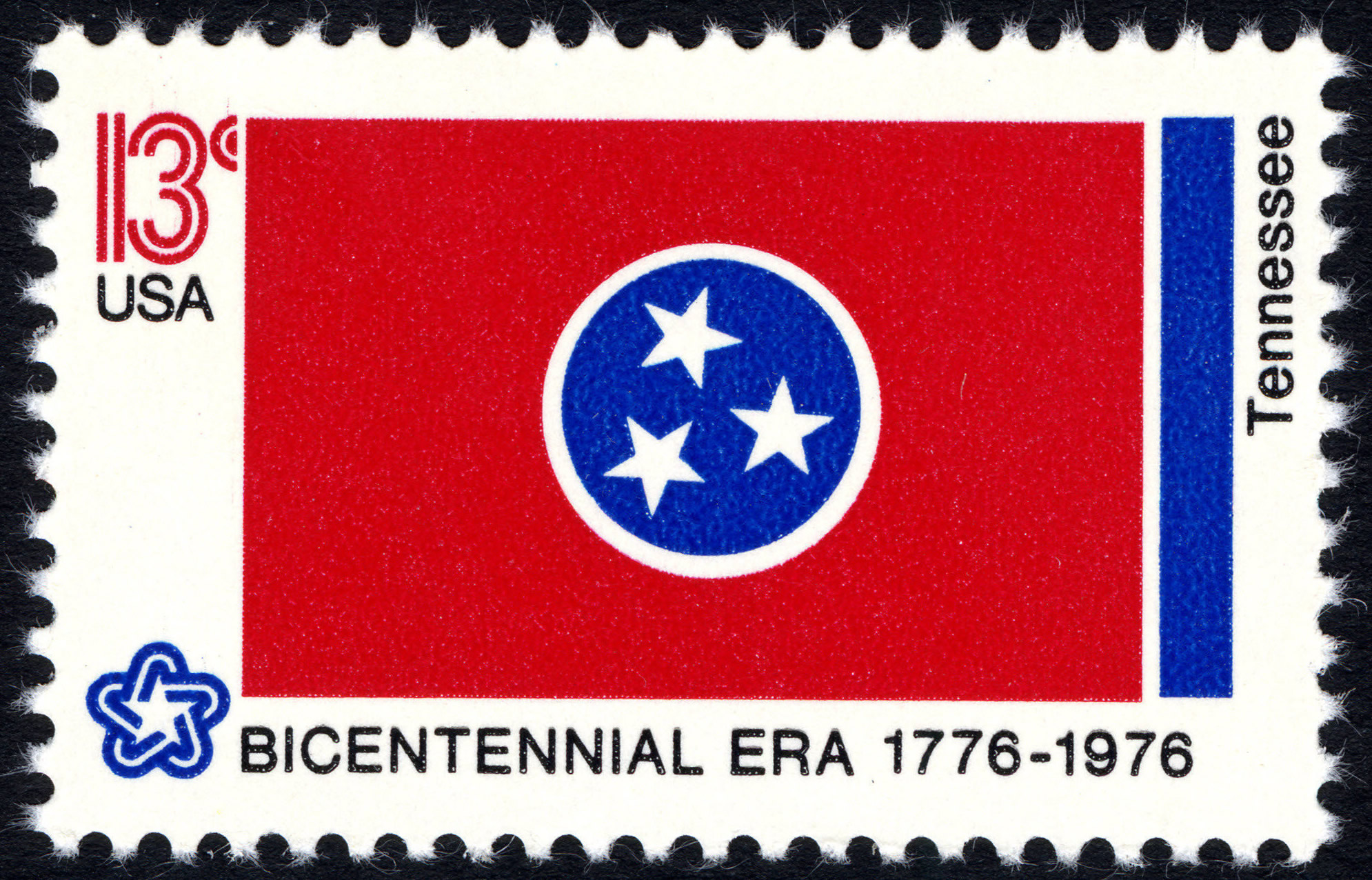
The flag of Tennessee as depicted in the 1976 bicentennial postage stamp series.

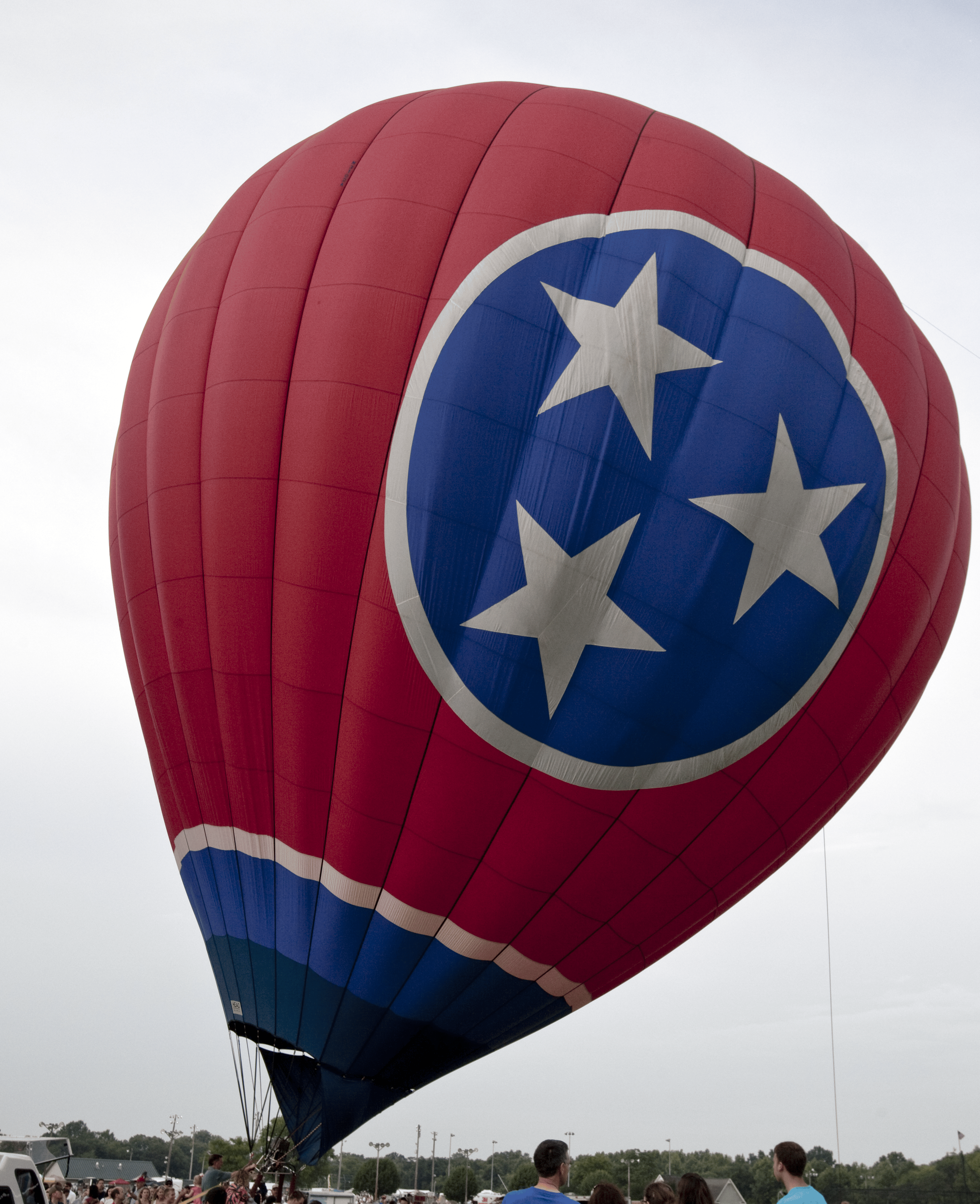
A state flag themed hot air balloon at Jubilee Festival, Decatur, Alabama, May 2010.

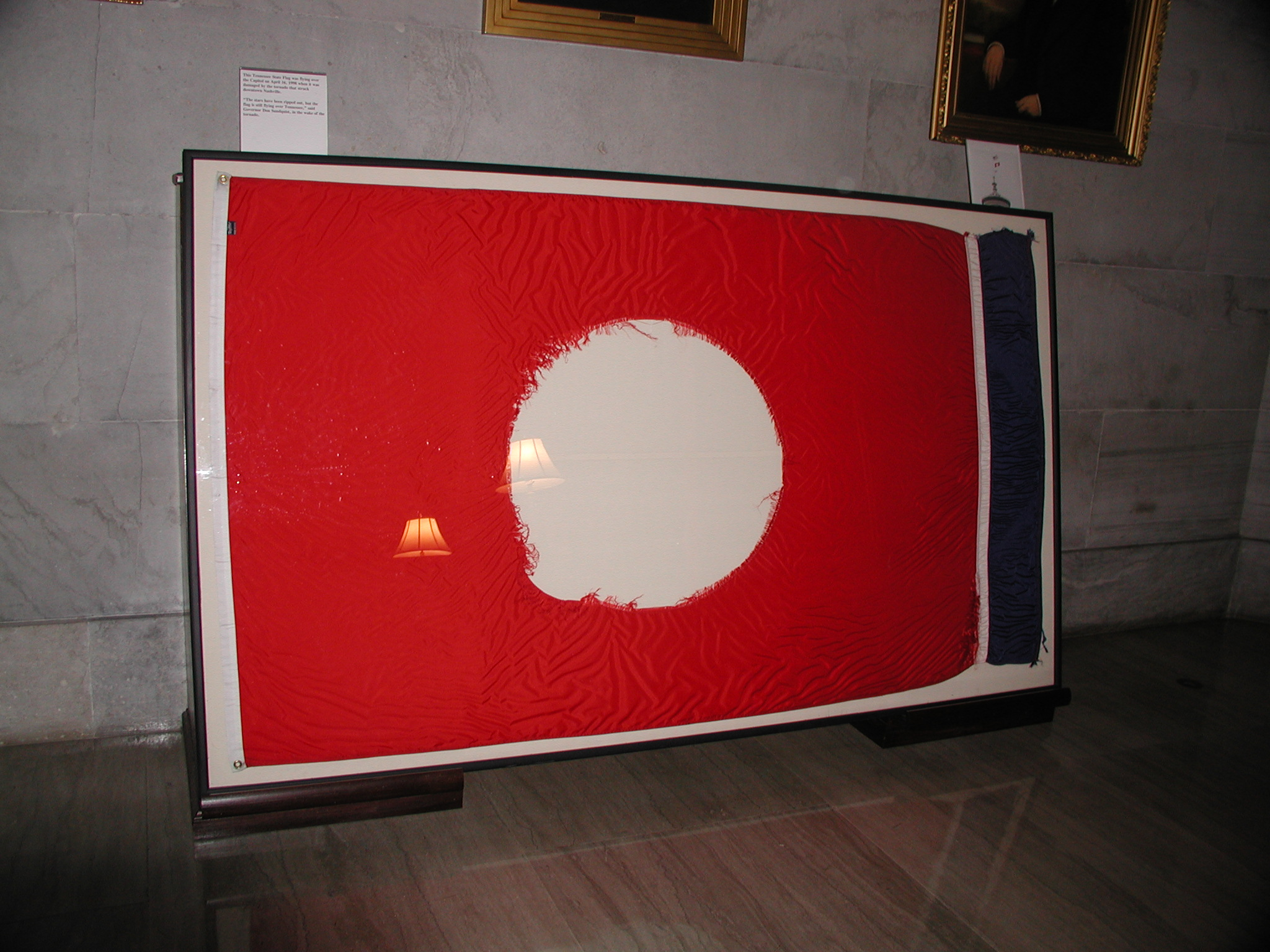
The Tennessee state flag which flew over the Capitol during the Tornado outbreak of April 15–16, 1998. The middle emblem was ripped out during the storm. This flag is on display at the Tennessee State Capitol.

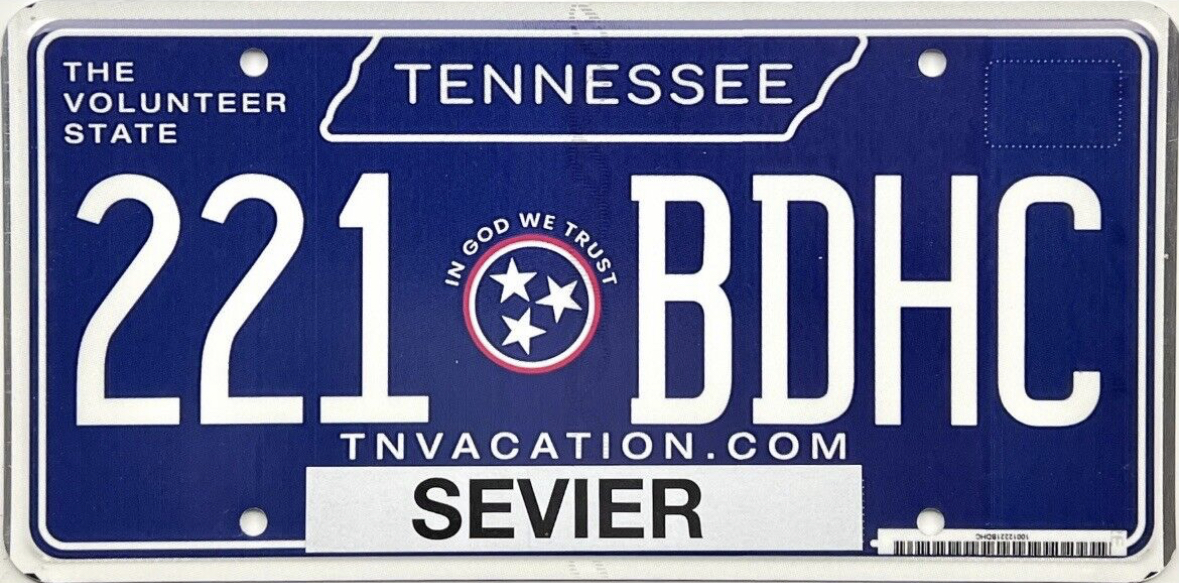
A sample Tennessee vehicle plates incorporating the flag's emblem as a logo.

== See also ==
- List of Tennessee state symbols
- Seal of Tennessee
