= Seal of Tennessee =

Official government emblem of the U.S. state of Tennessee

The Great Seal of Tennessee

Versions
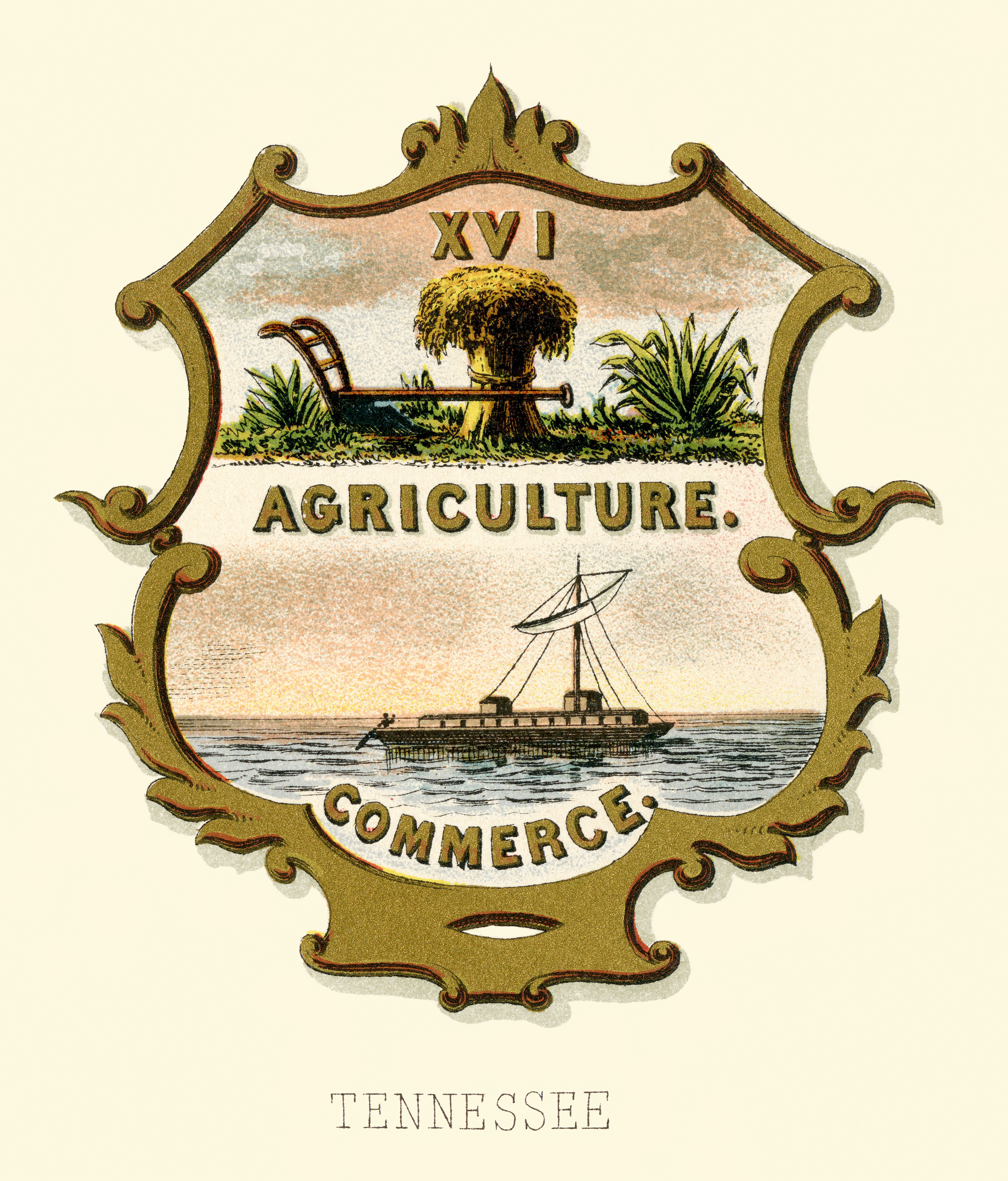
- Historical coat of arms
- Armiger: State of Tennessee
- Adopted: September 25, 1801 (224 years ago)
- Motto: 'Agriculture,' 'Commerce'

The Great Seal of Tennessee is the official government emblem of the U.S. state of Tennessee.

== Design ==
At the top of the Great Seal appear the Roman numerals XVI, signifying Tennessee’s position as the 16th state to join the United States. In the original design, the phrases "The Great Seal of the State of Tennessee" and "Feb. 6th, 1796" surrounded the central imagery; the month and day were removed in 1929. Centered within the seal are images of a plow, a bundle of wheat, and a cotton plant, with the word "agriculture" displayed below. Wheat and cotton represent the importance of farming to the state’s economy.

== History ==
The Tennessee Constitution of 1796 required the creation of a state seal, but Governors John Sevier and Archibald Roane used their personal seals on state documents until a design was actually undertaken in 1801. The original version, completed in 1802, remained in use before a brief period following the Civil War when Governor Parson Brownlow temporarily used his own seal nicknamed “Brownlow’s seal”. It is not entirely known why he did this, but some believe it was an attempt to distance the state from postwar imagery, as well as the fact that the Confederates had used the seal during the war and even on some battle flags. Following Brownlow’s tenure as governor, the state resumed use of the original seal and did so until 1929. The lower half of the original seal featured a boat and boatman above the word "commerce", symbolizing the significance of river trade. This was later simplified to a flat-bottomed riverboat without a boatman (see comparisons below). The current version of the seal was officially adopted in 1987 by the 95th General Assembly under Public Chapter 402.

== Modernization ==
The seal of the state changed over time. On the left is the original 1802 seal, compared to the 1929 update.

== See also ==
- Flag of Tennessee
- List of Tennessee state symbols
