= Tennessee Bicentennial Rap =

History-themed official rap song

Song by Joan Hill Hanks
- Written: 1995
- Published: 1996
- Genre: Rap, novelty song
- Length: 1:17
- Songwriter: Joan Hill Hanks

The Tennessee Bicentennial Rap is a novelty song that describes elements of the geography, history, culture and economy of the U.S. state of Tennessee. It was designated by the Tennessee General Assembly as the state's official bicentennial rap to mark the state's 200th anniversary in 1996, alongside Tennessee's many official state songs. The rap was written and performed by Joan Hill Hanks, a history enthusiast and poet from Signal Mountain, Tennessee.

== History ==
Hanks, a resident of the Chattanooga suburb of Signal Mountain, was president of the Tennessee Society of the Daughters of the War of 1812. Hanks had been writing poetry since the 1970s and would read her work with a beat, which she described as "writing rap and [I] didn't know it." She wrote the "Tennessee Bicentennial Rap" in 1995 for the state's upcoming bicentennial at age 67. She believed that the rap would attract the interest of young people by being in "their idiom, that type of beat."

In January 1996, State Sen. David Fowler and State Rep. Bill H. McAfee introduced a resolution to make the tune the state's "official bicentennial rap," which was enacted later that year. Fowler said he wanted to honor the song for "teaching history in a way that could be appreciated by a younger generation." The song was performed at bicentennial celebrations that year, including in Hermitage (by Hanks) and Memphis. Hanks performed the rap at school assemblies and on television. Depending on the audience, she would replace a lyric about sipping whiskey with a reference to rafting waters and swimming pools.

Although sources sometimes list the "Tennessee Bicentennial Rap" as one of Tennessee's official state songs, it is officially designated the state's bicentennial rap and not listed with other state songs in the state's Blue Book. In 2012, the rap was inducted into the Center for Popular Music at Middle Tennessee State University. Hanks died in 2023 at age 93.

== Lyrics ==
The lyrics begin with "TENNE-, TENNE-, TENNES-SEE! / Oh, how proud we are of thee!" The song then names the three U.S. presidents from Tennessee—Andrew Jackson, James K. Polk and Andrew Johnson—as well as other political leaders from the state such as John Sevier, Cordell Hull, Estes Kefauver and Al Gore. The rap names several Tennessee universities, then describes the state's topography from the Appalachian Mountains to the Mississippi River. The lyrics identify food and drink–related Tennessee topics ("Whisky, whisky - sipping smooth / Moon, Moon Pies and Goo Goo Goos!") and name Tennessee musical subjects like the Grand Ole Opry and Memphis blues. The song also name-checks other official Tennessee symbols such as the iris, mockingbird and the tulip poplar tree, before concluding with "Birthday wishes on 200 years / Give Tennessee a big, big cheer!"

== Reception ==
Drew Cline of the Josiah Bartlett Center for Public Policy described it as "an unlistenable novelty song" and criticized lawmakers for choosing it as an official state rap over Arrested Development's Grammy-winning "Tennessee". John Gullion of the Morristown Citizen Tribune said that many of the song's rhymes (Kefauver/honor, 1812/dwell) do not work and described it as "probably the worst song I've ever heard," although he said Hanks "sounds like a neat lady who was enthusiastic about and proud of her song and its recognition by the state. ... I feel a certain appreciation for the effort even if the idea and execution were fatally flawed."

== See also ==
- List of Tennessee state symbols
- Bicentennial Capitol Mall State Park
