= Grand Divisions of Tennessee =

Three legally-recognized geographic regions in the U.S. state of Tennessee

Tennessee's state flag. The three stars represent the state's three Grand Divisions.

The Grand Divisions are three geographic regions in the U.S. state of Tennessee, each constituting roughly one-third of the state's land area, that are geographically, culturally, legally, and economically distinct. The Grand Divisions are legally recognized in the state constitution and state law and are represented on the flag of Tennessee by the flag's three prominent stars.

The Grand Divisions, East, Middle, and West Tennessee, are sometimes referred to as "the three states of Tennessee" or "the three Tennessees".

== Definitions ==
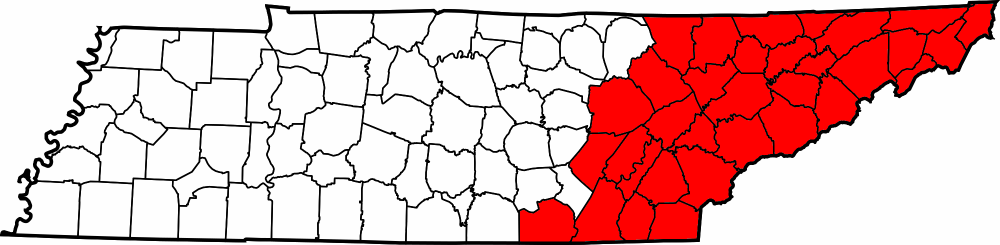
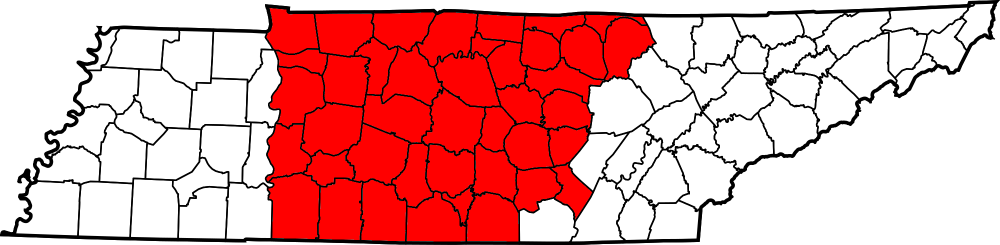
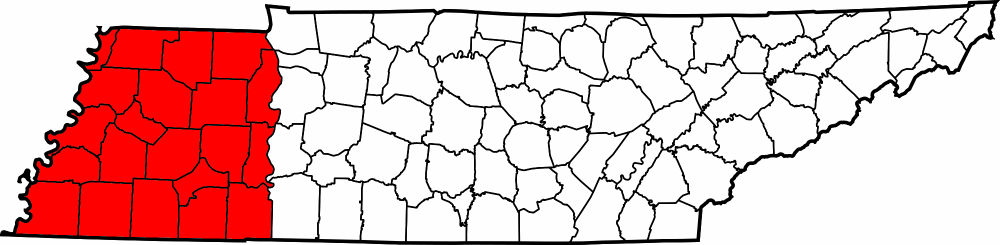
Maps of the Grand Divisions of Tennessee, with East Tennessee at the top, Middle Tennessee in the center, and West Tennessee at the bottom.

The three Grand Divisions, East, Middle, and West Tennessee, are formally defined in state law at Tennessee Code Annotated Title 4, Chapter 1, Part 2 ("Grand Divisions and State Capital") as the "eastern, middle, and western" Grand Divisions of the state. The law lists the counties in each region.

The boundary between East Tennessee and Middle Tennessee is on the Cumberland Plateau, which was a major barrier to travel and commerce during much of the state's early history. The boundary is close to the line between the Eastern and Central time zones. All but three counties of East Tennessee (Bledsoe, Cumberland, and Marion) are in the Eastern Time Zone, while Middle and West Tennessee are entirely in the Central Time Zone. The reach of the Tennessee River that flows northward to Kentucky from Mississippi and Alabama demarcates the boundary between Middle and West Tennessee starting from the northern border of Hardin County, which is bisected by the Tennessee River but is located wholly in West Tennessee.

The assignments of counties can be changed by the state legislature, but few changes to the boundaries between the Grand Divisions have been made since the earliest legal reference to them, in The Acts of Tennessee 1835-1836, Chapter 3, "An Act to establish a Supreme Court in pursuance of the 2nd sec., art. 6, of the Constitution of the United States". The most recent adjustment to the boundaries of the Grand Divisions occurred in 1965, when Perry County was shifted from West Tennessee to Middle Tennessee. Earlier in the 20th century, there were definitional changes that shifted the assignments of Marion, Sequatchie, and Cumberland Counties between East and Middle Tennessee (Sequatchie moved from East to Middle Tennessee; Marion and Cumberland counties moved from Middle to East Tennessee).

== Statistics ==
Grand Division	Population (2020 census)	Largest city	Area in mi^{2} (km^{2})	Counties
East Tennessee	2,470,105	Knoxville	13,558 mi^{2} (35,120 km^{2})	33 (list)
Middle Tennessee	2,883,086	Nashville	17,009 mi^{2} (44,050 km^{2})	41 (list)
West Tennessee	1,557,649	Memphis	10,650 mi^{2} (27,600 km^{2})	21 (list)
State of Tennessee	6,910,840	Nashville	41,217 mi^{2} (106,750 km^{2})	95 (list)

== Characteristics ==
The three regions are geographically and culturally distinct. East Tennessee's landscape is dominated by the Appalachian mountain chain, including the Great Smoky Mountains on the eastern border of the state, the ridge-and-valley region where East Tennessee's principal cities (Knoxville, Chattanooga, and the Tri-Cities) are located, and the rugged Cumberland Mountains. East and Middle Tennessee are separated along the Cumberland Plateau. Middle Tennessee, which includes the state's capital city of Nashville, is dominated by rolling hills and fertile stream valleys. West Tennessee, located between the Tennessee and the Mississippi Rivers, is the lowest-lying of the three Grand Divisions. It is part of the Gulf Coastal Plain physiographic region, characterized by relatively flat topography. Except for the Memphis metropolitan area, land use in this region is mostly agricultural. Historically, cotton was West Tennessee's dominant crop.

The physiographic and economic differences between the three regions resulted in major divisions within Tennessee in the Civil War. The plantation agricultural system associated with cotton production meant that slavery was very important to the economy of West Tennessee, where voters strongly supported secession. Support for secession was not as strong in Middle Tennessee, where plantation agriculture was present but less important. In mountainous East Tennessee, where plantation agriculture was largely absent and slavery was not economically important, voters strongly opposed secession. Although the entire state seceded from the Union and joined the Confederacy, East Tennessee remained an area of pro-Union sentiment and activity throughout the Civil War and afterward. The Republican Party dominated politics in the region. Before and during the Civil War, there was a movement in East Tennessee to counter-secede from the Confederacy and re-join the Union as the State of Nickajack, together with other Union-friendly Southern areas, such as North Alabama.

The three regions also have cultural differences. Studies have found detectable differences between the dialects spoken in the three divisions.

Black Tennesseans are not distributed evenly across the three divisions. Partly because of West Tennessee's history of slavery, it has had a higher concentration of African Americans in the population. In the census in 2000, West Tennessee's population was found to be 37% black, while in Middle and East Tennessee, black people made up 12% and 6% of their respective populations.

== Legal significance ==
The Tennessee State Constitution mandates that no more than two of the five justices on the state's supreme court can be from any one Grand Division. The court must also meet regularly in each division in the cities of Jackson in West Tennessee, Nashville in Middle Tennessee, and Knoxville in East Tennessee. Similar rules apply to some other state institutions. For example:

- The former Tennessee Public Service Commission was required to consist of three commissioners, including one commissioner from each Grand Division, although the commissioners were elected in statewide elections.
- State law requires that the ten-member Tennessee Textbook Commission, which consists mainly of professional educators, must include three members who do not work in education — one from each of the three Grand Divisions.
- State law requires a particular number of appellate judges be from each Grand Division.

== Symbolic representations ==
In describing his design for the Tennessee state flag, which was adopted in 1905, Le Roy Reeves wrote, "The three stars are of pure white, representing the three grand divisions of the state." He explained the placement of the stars inside a blue circle as symbolic of "three bound together in one—an indissoluble trinity."

The state formerly featured the Grand Divisions in tourism promotions. In the 1960s, billboards at the state's borders greeted visitors with the words, "Welcome to the Three States of Tennessee". The slogan was abandoned during the governorship of Winfield Dunn (who was from Memphis, but as a Republican got his strongest vote from East Tennessee), due to concerns that it might encourage sectionalism.

=== 2002 State commemorative quarter ===
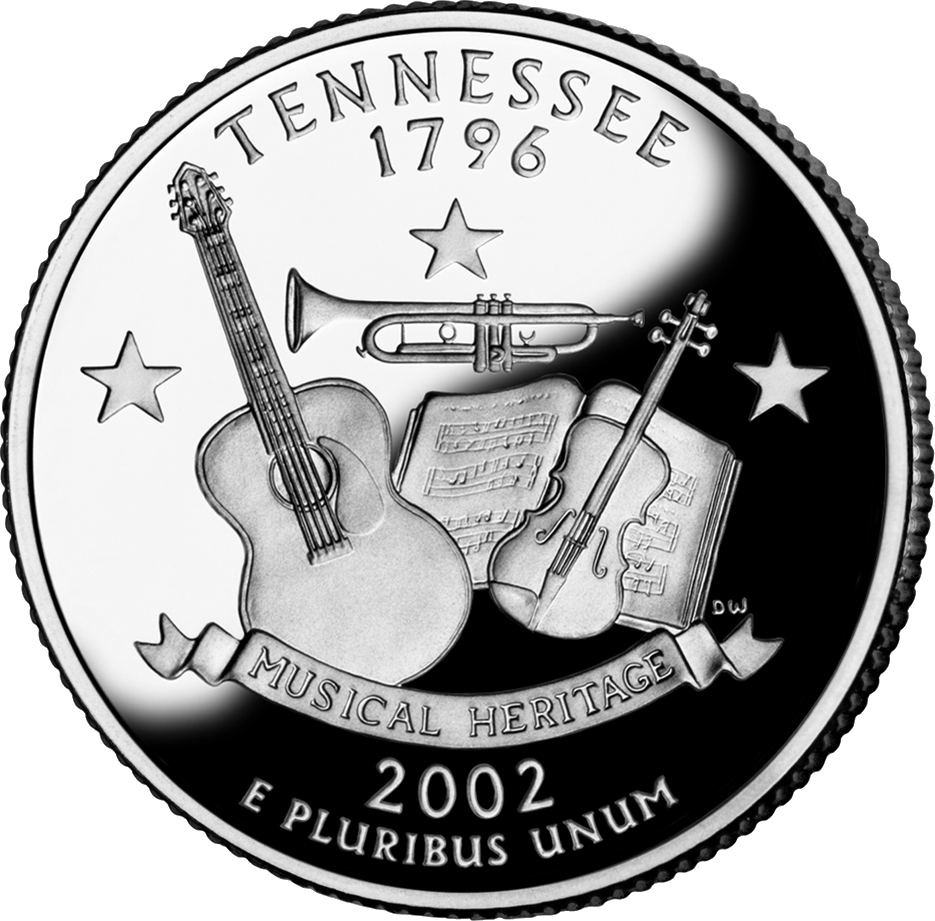
Reverse of the 2002 Tennessee state quarter, issued as part of the 50 State quarters series

The Tennessee commemorative quarter issued by the U.S. Mint in 2002 was designed to honor the musical heritage of the three grand divisions, each of which is strongly associated with a particular style of music. East Tennessee is known for Appalachian bluegrass, Middle Tennessee for country music and the Grand Ole Opry, and West Tennessee for the Delta blues. Below a trio of stars that represent the three grand divisions, the quarter depicts a guitar for the country music of Nashville and Middle Tennessee, a fiddle and a book of music for the bluegrass tradition of East Tennessee, and a trumpet for the blues music of Memphis and the Mississippi Delta (part of West Tennessee).

== See also ==
- Tennessee Frontiers: Three Regions in Transition by John R. Finger
