= My Homeland, Tennessee =

First of ten official state songs of Tennessee, U.S.

"My Homeland, Tennessee," the first of Tennessee's ten official state songs, was written by Roy Lamont Smith and Nell Grayson Taylor. Taylor, a previously published poet and World War I nurse, was responsible for the text of the song. Smith, an instructor at the Cadek Conservatory of Music in Chattanooga, Tennessee, supplied the music, and the combined effort was entered into a contest soliciting a patriotic state song for Tennessee. The song won, and as a result, it was adopted by the Tennessee State Legislature in 1925.
