= Makky Kaylor =

American songwriter (born 1964)

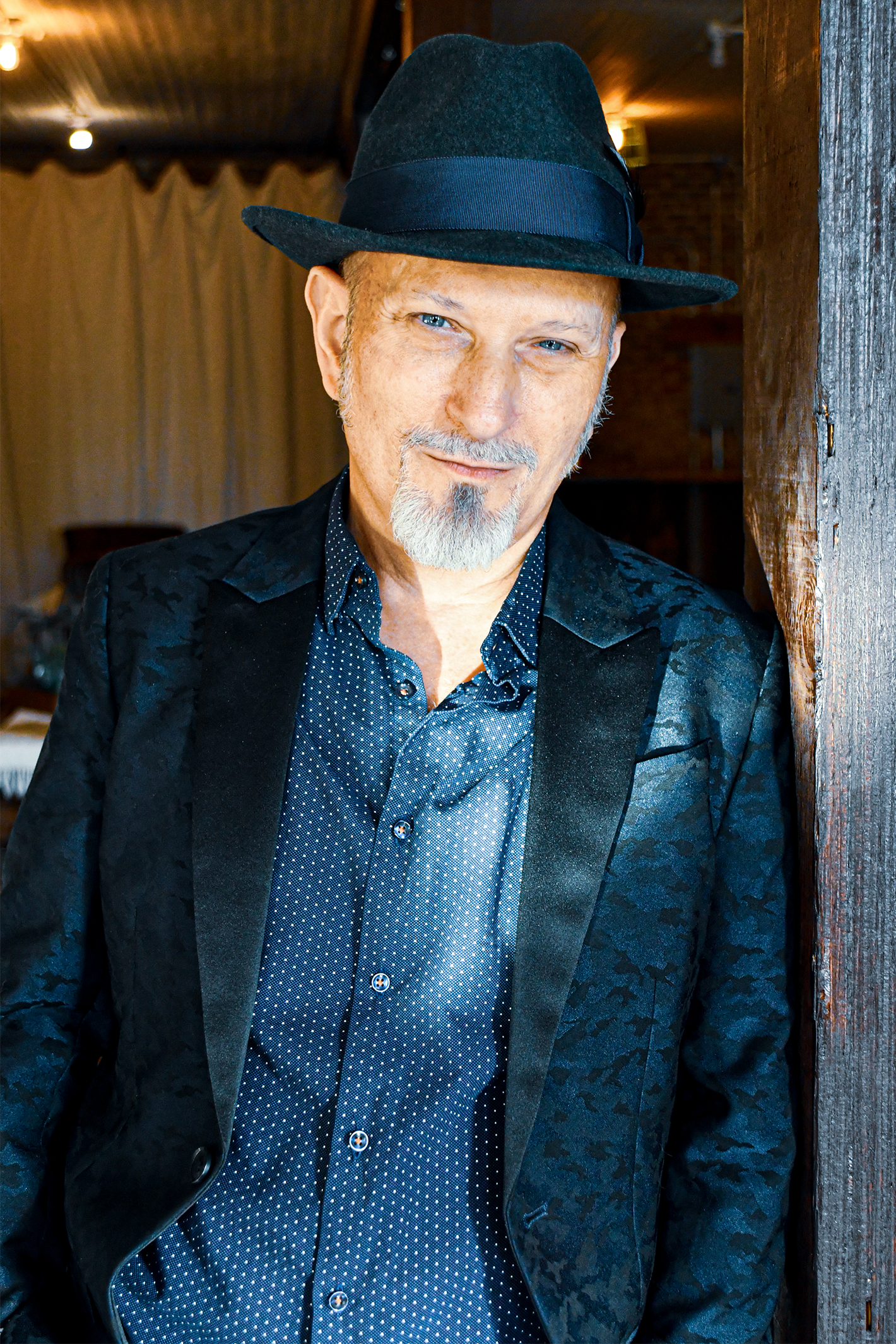

Background information
- Born: Morris Alan Kaylor; February 10, 1964 (age 62); Memphis, Tennessee, USA
- Genres: Country jazz, Southern Soul
- Occupations: Songwriter, artist, entertainer
- Instruments: Vocals, piano
- Years active: 1975-present

Makky Kaylor (born Morris Alan Kaylor) is an American songwriter born on February 10, 1964, in Memphis, Tennessee. He is a professional songwriter, notably recognized in 2024 as the composer of Tennessee's 13th official state song, "Tennessee, In My Dreams." Kaylor is also a recording artist, entertainer, and radio personality.

== Career ==
In his early years, Kaylor wrote songs on the piano and performed on stage in elementary school. At 15, he officially began his music career as a lead vocalist and occasional keyboardist, performing regionally. This musical basis paved the way for a career as a studio session vocalist. His session work and songwriting eventually led him to Nashville at age 25, where he became a staff songwriter on Music Row for various music publishing companies and has written numerous songs by multiple artists.

While in Nashville, Kaylor became an A-list demo singer for many Hall of Fame songwriters, including Harlan Howard, Randy Goodrum, Bob Morrison, and Jim Weatherly. He is the author of "Confessions of a Session Singer," published by Hal Leonard Publishing/Backbeat Books in 2007.

Kaylor's recording repertoire includes commercial jingles, like prominent brands such as The Grand Ole Opry and Blue Diamond Almonds. As a recording artist, he has produced several albums and singles, highlighting his songwriting and smooth soulful vocal style. His song, "They Saw A King," was co-written and recorded with Grammy winner Larry Gatlin and The Gatlin Brothers. Kaylor has performed at grand venues such as The Ryman Auditorium and the Tennessee Theatre. His television appearances encompass a variety of shows on The Family Channel, RFD-TV, Hulu/CBS, and The Hallmark Channel.

In 2022, Kaylor, Brenda Lynn Allen, and Jack Plant co-founded Muletown Sound, Inc./Southern Roots Radio, a worldwide music broadcasting company based in "Muletown" Columbia, Tennessee. Kaylor co-hosts the multi-platform broadcast "Swanky Southern Nights" with Allen, showcasing his trademarked "The Swanky South" music brand, featuring an original blend of jazz, country, and soul music.

In 2023, the state designated Kaylor "The Tennessee Troubadour." He has received several regional designations, including "Swanky South Day" (2020) and "Makky Kaylor Day" (2024) from the governments of Columbia, Tennessee, and Maury County.

In 2024, Kaylor's original composition "Tennessee, In My Dreams" became Tennessee's 13th official state song. On April 16, 2024, Governor William Lee signed a bill enacting Kaylor's composition as an official state song. On September 14, 2024 the Commonwealth of Kentucky commissioned Kaylor as a Kentucky Colonel.

== Discology ==
Albums

Year	Title	Label
2012	Glad Tidings	Independent
2013	A Little Sentimental – A Storybook Album	Vision Records
2020	Live from the Swanky South	Really Good Records

Singles

Year	Title
2002	"They Saw a King"
2021	"How Our Love Song is Played"
2021	"My Baby's Lovin'"
2021	"I Want to Love You"
2021	"Too Many Songs About Memphis"
2024	"Tennessee, In My Dreams"
