= Index of Tennessee-related articles =

The location of the state of Tennessee in the United States of America

The following is an alphabetical list of articles related to the U.S. state of Tennessee.

== 0–9 ==
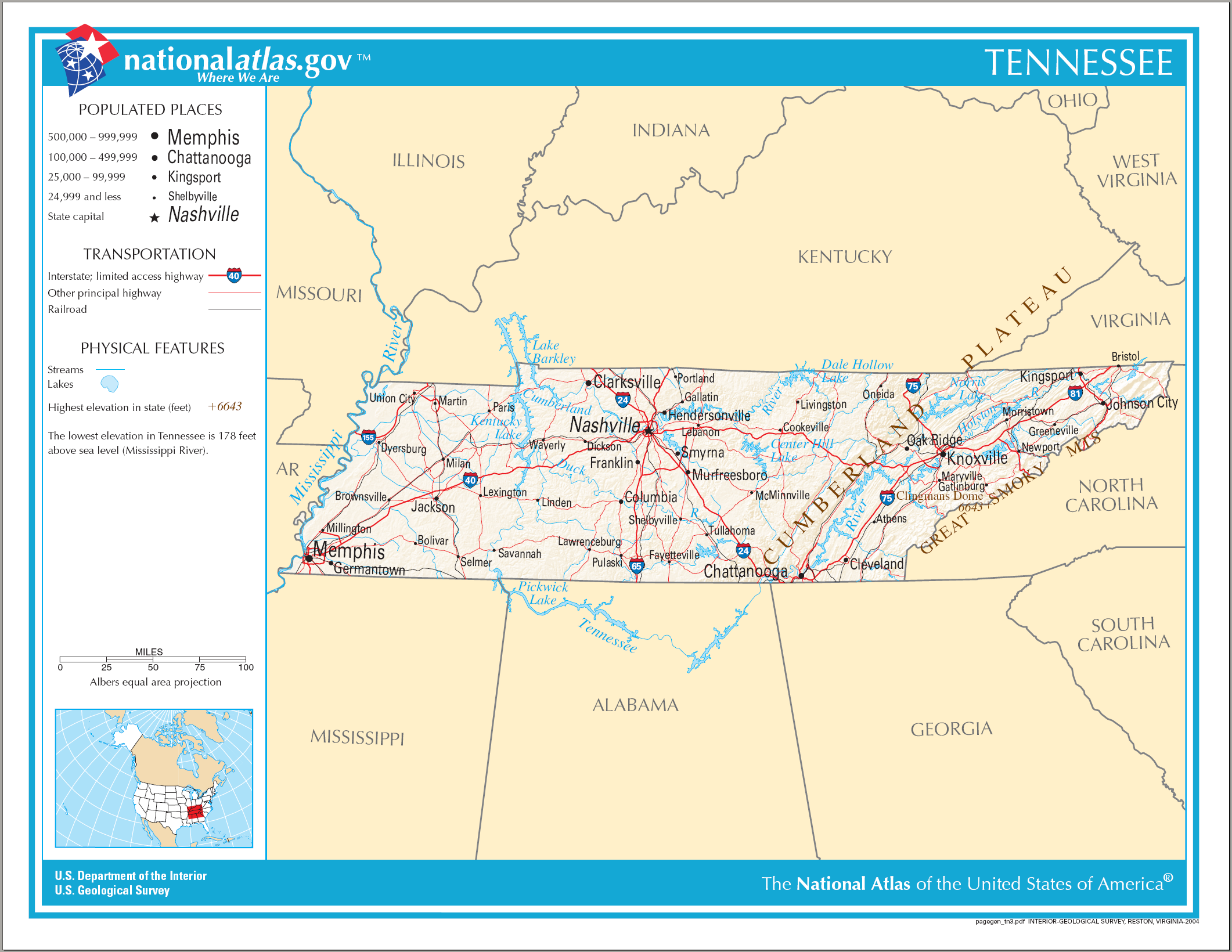
An enlargeable map of the state of Tennessee

- .tn.us – Internet second-level domain for the state of Tennessee
- 16th state to join the United States of America

== A ==
- Abortion in Tennessee
- Adjacent states: (one of only two states with eight neighboring states)
  - Commonwealth of Kentucky
  - Commonwealth of Virginia
  - State of Alabama
  - State of Arkansas
  - State of Georgia
  - State of Mississippi
  - State of Missouri
  - State of North Carolina
- Agriculture in Tennessee
- Airports in Tennessee
- Alcohol laws in Tennessee
- Amusement parks in Tennessee
- Appalachia
- Aquaria in Tennessee
  - commons:Category:Aquaria in Tennessee
- Arboreta in Tennessee
  - commons:Category:Arboreta in Tennessee
- Archaeology in Tennessee
  - Category:Archaeological sites in Tennessee
    - commons:Category:Archaeological sites in Tennessee
- Architecture in Tennessee
- Art museums and galleries in Tennessee
  - commons:Category:Art museums and galleries in Tennessee
- Astronomical observatories in Tennessee
  - commons:Category:Astronomical observatories in Tennessee

== B ==
- Botanical gardens in Tennessee
  - commons:Category:Botanical gardens in Tennessee
- Buildings and structures in Tennessee
  - commons:Category:Buildings and structures in Tennessee

== C ==
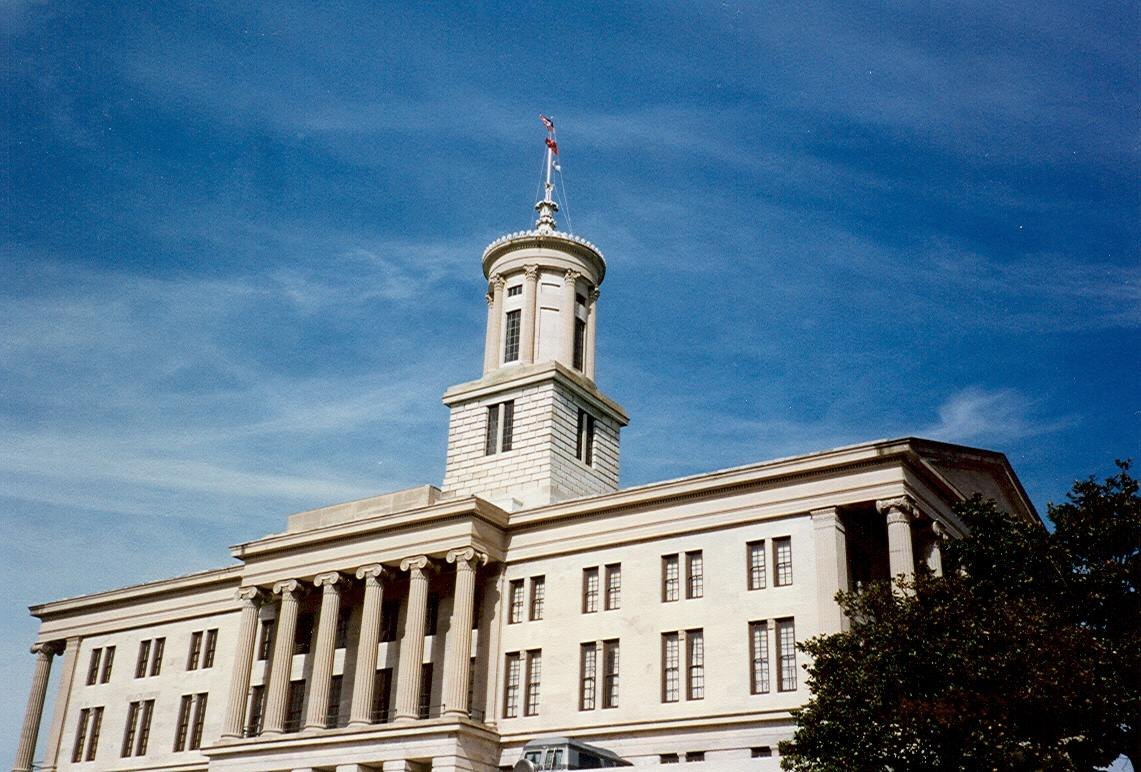
The Tennessee State Capitol in Nashville

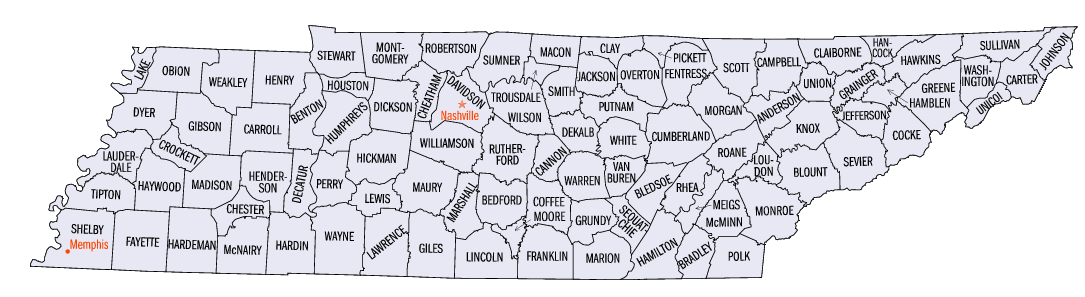
An enlargeable map of the 95 counties of the state of Tennessee

- Cannabis in Tennessee
- Capital of the State of Tennessee
- Capital punishment in Tennessee
- Capitol of the State of Tennessee
  - commons:Category:Tennessee State Capitol
- Caves of Tennessee
  - commons:Category:Caves of Tennessee
- Census statistical areas of Tennessee
- Cities in Tennessee
  - commons:Category:Cities in Tennessee
- Citizens for Home Rule
- Climate of Tennessee
- Climate change in Tennessee
- Colleges and universities in Tennessee
  - commons:Category:Universities and colleges in Tennessee
- Communications in Tennessee
  - commons:Category:Communications in Tennessee
- Companies in Tennessee
- Congressional districts of Tennessee
- Constitution of Tennessee
- Convention centers in Tennessee
  - commons:Category:Convention centers in Tennessee
- Counties of the state of Tennessee
  - commons:Category:Counties in Tennessee
- Crime in Tennessee
- Culture of Tennessee
  - commons:Category:Tennessee culture

== D ==
- Demographics of Tennessee

== E ==
- Economy of Tennessee
  - Category:Economy of Tennessee
    - commons:Category:Economy of Tennessee
- Education in Tennessee
  - Category:Education in Tennessee
    - commons:Category:Education in Tennessee
- Elections in Tennessee
  - commons:Category:Elections in Tennessee
- Environment of Tennessee
  - commons:Category:Environment of Tennessee

== F ==
The flag of the state of Tennessee

- Festivals in Tennessee
  - commons:Category:Festivals in Tennessee
- Flag of Knoxville, Tennessee
- Flag of the state of Tennessee
- Forts in Tennessee
  - Category:Forts in Tennessee
    - commons:Category:Forts in Tennessee

== G ==
- Geography of Tennessee
  - Category:Geography of Tennessee
    - commons:Category:Geography of Tennessee
- Geology of Tennessee
  - Category:Geology of Tennessee
    - commons:Category:Geology of Tennessee
- Ghost towns in Tennessee
  - Category:Ghost towns in Tennessee
    - commons:Category:Ghost towns in Tennessee
- Golf clubs and courses in Tennessee
- Government of Tennessee website
  - Category:Government of Tennessee
    - commons:Category:Government of Tennessee
- Governor of Tennessee
  - List of governors of Tennessee
- Seal of Tennessee
- Great Smoky Mountains National Park
- Gun laws in Tennessee

== H ==
- Damon Rivers Headden
- Heritage railroads in Tennessee
  - commons:Category:Heritage railroads in Tennessee
- High schools of Tennessee
- Higher education in Tennessee
- Highway routes in Tennessee
- Hiking trails in Tennessee
  - commons:Category:Hiking trails in Tennessee
- History of Tennessee
  - Historical outline of Tennessee
- Hospitals in Tennessee
- House of Representatives of the State of Tennessee

== I ==
- Images of Tennessee
  - commons:Category:Tennessee

== K ==
- Kingston, Tennessee, state capital for one day in 1807
- Knoxville, Tennessee, territorial capital 1791–1796, state capital 1796–1807, 1807–1812, and 1817–1818

== L ==
- Lakes of Tennessee
  - commons:Category:Lakes of Tennessee
- Landmarks in Tennessee
  - commons:Category:Landmarks in Tennessee
- LGBT rights in Tennessee
- Lieutenant Governor of the State of Tennessee
- Lists related to the State of Tennessee:
  - List of airports in Tennessee
  - List of census statistical areas in Tennessee
  - List of cities in Tennessee
  - List of colleges and universities in Tennessee
  - List of counties in Tennessee
  - List of forts in Tennessee
  - List of ghost towns in Tennessee
  - List of governors of Tennessee
  - List of high schools in Tennessee
  - List of highway routes in Tennessee
  - List of hospitals in Tennessee
  - List of individuals executed in Tennessee
  - List of law enforcement agencies in Tennessee
  - List of lieutenant governors of Tennessee
  - List of museums in Tennessee
  - List of National Historic Landmarks in Tennessee
  - List of newspapers in Tennessee
  - List of people from Tennessee
  - List of radio stations in Tennessee
  - List of railroads in Tennessee
  - List of Registered Historic Places in Tennessee
  - List of rivers of Tennessee
  - List of school districts in Tennessee
  - List of state forests in Tennessee
  - List of state highway routes in Tennessee
  - List of state parks in Tennessee
  - List of state prisons in Tennessee
  - List of symbols of the State of Tennessee
  - List of television stations in Tennessee
  - List of towns in Tennessee
  - List of Tennessee's congressional delegations
  - List of United States congressional districts in Tennessee
  - List of United States representatives from Tennessee
  - List of United States senators from Tennessee

== M ==
- Maps of Tennessee
  - commons:Category:Maps of Tennessee
- Mass media in Tennessee
- Memphis, Tennessee
- Memphis Zoo
- Milan Army Ammunition Plant
- Mississippi River
- Mountains of Tennessee
  - commons:Category:Mountains of Tennessee
- Murfreesboro, Tennessee, state capital 1818-1826
- Museums in Tennessee
  - Category:Museums in Tennessee
  - commons:Category:Museums in Tennessee
- Music of Tennessee
  - commons:Category:Music of Tennessee
  - Category:Musical groups from Tennessee
  - Category:Musicians from Tennessee

== N ==
- Nashville, Tennessee, state capital 1812-1817 and since 1826
- National forests of Tennessee
  - commons:Category:National Forests of Tennessee
- Natural arches of Tennessee
  - commons:Category:Natural arches of Tennessee
- Natural history of Tennessee
  - commons:Category:Natural history of Tennessee
- Nature centers in Tennessee
  - commons:Category:Nature centers in Tennessee
- Newspapers of Tennessee

== O ==
- Outdoor sculptures in Tennessee
  - commons:Category:Outdoor sculptures in Tennessee

== P ==
- People from Tennessee
  - Category:People from Tennessee
    - commons:Category:People from Tennessee
    - Category:People from Tennessee by populated place
    - Category:People from Tennessee by county
    - Category:People from Tennessee by occupation
- Politics of Tennessee
  - commons:Category:Politics of Tennessee
- Protected areas of Tennessee
  - commons:Category:Protected areas of Tennessee

== R ==
- Radio stations in Tennessee
- Railroad museums in Tennessee
  - commons:Category:Railroad museums in Tennessee
- Railroads in Tennessee
- Registered historic places in Tennessee
  - commons:Category:Registered Historic Places in Tennessee
- Religion in Tennessee
  - Category:Religion in Tennessee
    - commons:Category:Religion in Tennessee
- Rivers of Tennessee
  - commons:Category:Rivers of Tennessee
- Rocky Mount, capital of the Territory South of the River Ohio 1790-1791
- Roller coasters in Tennessee
  - commons:Category:Roller coasters in Tennessee

== S ==
- Same-sex marriage in Tennessee
- School districts of Tennessee
- Scopes Trial
- Scouting in Tennessee
- Secretary of the State of Tennessee
- Senate of the State of Tennessee
- Settlements in Tennessee
  - Cities in Tennessee
  - Towns in Tennessee
  - Census Designated Places in Tennessee
  - Other unincorporated communities in Tennessee
  - List of ghost towns in Tennessee
- Sports in Tennessee
  - Category:Sports in Tennessee
    - commons:Category:Sports in Tennessee
  - Category:Sports venues in Tennessee
    - commons:Category:Sports venues in Tennessee
- State Capitol of Tennessee
- State highway routes in Tennessee
- State of Tennessee website
  - Constitution of the State of Tennessee
  - Government of the State of Tennessee
    - Category:Government of Tennessee
      - commons:Category:Government of Tennessee
  - Executive branch of the government of the State of Tennessee
    - Governor of the State of Tennessee
  - Legislative branch of the government of the State of Tennessee
    - Legislature of the State of Tennessee
      - Senate of the State of Tennessee
      - House of Representatives of the State of Tennessee
  - Judicial branch of the government of the State of Tennessee
    - Supreme Court of the State of Tennessee
- State parks of Tennessee
  - commons:Category:State parks of Tennessee
- State prisons of Tennessee
- Structures in Tennessee
  - commons:Category:Buildings and structures in Tennessee
- Supreme Court of the State of Tennessee
- Symbols of the State of Tennessee
  - commons:Category:Symbols of Tennessee
- Society of Workforce Planning Professionals

== T ==
- Telecommunications in Tennessee
  - commons:Category:Communications in Tennessee
- Telephone area codes in Tennessee
- Television shows set in Tennessee
- Television stations in Tennessee
- Tennessee website
  - Category:Tennessee
    - commons:Category:Tennessee
      - commons:Category:Maps of Tennessee
- Tennessee Barn Dance
- Tennessee Heritage Protection Act
- Tennessee Hurricanes
- Tennessee login law
- Tennessee Marriage Protection Amendment
- Tennessee Native Plant Society
- Tennessee River
- Tennessee River 600
- Tennessee Soybean Festival
- Tennessee State Capitol
- Tennessee Student Assistance Corporation
- Tennessee Valley Authority
- Theatres in Tennessee
  - commons:Category:Theatres in Tennessee
- TN – United States Postal Service postal code for the State of Tennessee
- Tourism in Tennessee
  - commons:Category:Tourism in Tennessee
- Towns in Tennessee
  - commons:Category:Cities in Tennessee
- Transportation in Tennessee
  - Category:Transportation in Tennessee
    - commons:Category:Transport in Tennessee

== U ==
- United States of America
  - States of the United States of America
  - United States census statistical areas of Tennessee
  - Tennessee's congressional delegations
  - United States congressional districts in Tennessee
  - United States Court of Appeals for the Sixth Circuit
  - United States District Court for the Eastern District of Tennessee
  - United States District Court for the Middle District of Tennessee
  - United States District Court for the Western District of Tennessee
  - United States representatives from Tennessee
  - United States senators from Tennessee
- Universities and colleges in Tennessee
  - commons:Category:Universities and colleges in Tennessee
- US-TN – ISO 3166-2:US region code for the State of Tennessee

== W ==
- Water parks in Tennessee
- Waterfalls of Tennessee
  - commons:Category:Waterfalls of Tennessee
- White's Fort, capital of the Territory South of the River Ohio 1791-1796
  Wikimedia
  - Wikimedia Commons:Category:Tennessee
    - commons:Category:Maps of Tennessee
  - Wikinews:Category:Tennessee
    - Wikinews:Portal:Tennessee
  - Wikipedia Category:Tennessee
    - Wikipedia Portal:Tennessee
    - Wikipedia:WikiProject Tennessee
      - Category:WikiProject Tennessee articles
      - Category:WikiProject Tennessee participants

== Z ==
- Zoos in Tennessee
  - commons:Category:Zoos in Tennessee

== See also ==
- Topic overview:
  - Tennessee
  - Outline of Tennessee
