= WCMT =

WCMT may refer to:

== Radio station call signs ==
- WCMT (AM), a radio station (1410 AM) licensed to Martin, Tennessee, United States
- WCMT-FM, a radio station (101.3 FM) licensed to South Fulton, Tennessee

== Organisations ==
- Winston Churchill Memorial Trusts
