= KYTN =

- Union City, Tennessee; United States
- Broadcast area: Jackson, Tennessee
- Frequency: 104.9 MHz
- Branding: "Country 104.9 KYTN"

Programming
- Format: Country
- Affiliations: Fox News Radio; Compass Media Networks; Westwood One

Ownership
- Owner: Thunderbolt Broadcasting Company
- Sister stations: WCDZ, WCMT, WCMT-FM, WQAK

History
- Former call signs: WALR (1974–1987); WKWT (1987–1998); WYVY (1998–2012)
- Call sign meaning: Kentucky Tennessee

Technical information
- Licensing authority: FCC
- Facility ID: 68612
- Class: A
- ERP: 6,000 watts
- HAAT: 93.0 meters (305.1 ft)

Links
- Public license information: Public file; LMS
- Webcast: Listen live
- Website: www.thunderboltradio.com/kytn/

KYTN (104.9 FM, "104.9 K-Y-T-N") is an American radio station broadcasting country music format. Licensed to Union City, Tennessee, United States, the station serves the Jackson, Tennessee and the Ken-Tenn area (Northwest Tennessee and the Jackson Purchase portion of Kentucky). The station is owned by Thunderbolt Broadcasting Company and features programming from Fox News Radio, Compass Media Networks, and Westwood One.

== History ==
Union City's first FM radio station, KYTN-FM, began broadcasting September 27, 1974, as WALR-FM (which stood for "We Advertise the Land of Reelfoot"), and was placed on the air by Ed Perkins of McKenzie, Tennessee (Perkins Broadcasting Company). Announcers included Larry Doxey, Woodie Cobb, Jim Adcock, Lou Wrather and Paul Tinkle. Tinkle, who worked at the station while attending UT Martin, now serves as president of Thunderbolt Broadcasting, the current owner of Country 104.9 KYTN-FM. The station played "MOR" (middle of the road) music for a number of years, and then caught the country bug, which has proven to be a favorite among Ken-Tenn area listeners. Today, the new rising country stars make their way to Union City because they have an opportunity to be on the air "live" with KYTN air personalities to talk about their music.

KYTN-FM (then WALR-FM) was originally located on the old Ken-Tenn highway but burned to the ground in 1982. The station moved to 709 South First Street in downtown Union City before moving to its present location at 223 Westgate Drive in Union City, TN on February 4, 2007.

Ed Perkins sold WALR-FM to Reelfoot Broadcasting, and the company was later sold to the Twin States Broadcasting, which added 105.7 WQAK FM which became Union City's second FM station. Thunderbolt Broadcasting of Martin, TN, purchased KYTN-FM (earlier known as WYVY-FM) and WQAK FM December 27, 2005, and moved the studios to a new state of the art broadcast center at 223 Westgate Drive, Union City, Tennessee on February 4, 2007.

104.9 KYTN (called K-Y-T-N because one-half of the broadcast signal is heard in Kentucky, and the other half in Tennessee) / KYTN-FM airs the St. Louis Cardinals baseball games and Obion Central High School sports. This is also the only broadcast station of any kind east of the Mississippi River outside of Pennsylvania or Minnesota to have call letters starting with K.

KYTN-TN is fully staffed with sales, programming and news departments and is considered the "local news" radio station in Obion County, Tennessee.

The radio station's tower is located in the "golden triangle" situated between Union City, Fulton and Martin on the old Ken-Tenn highway which allows the station to have a dominant signal over the area.

Thunderbolt Broadcasting owns and operates WCMT, WCMT-FM and WCDZ-FM, all located in Martin. KYTN-FM is a member of the International Broadcasters' Idea Bank, the National Association of Broadcasters, the Tennessee Association of Broadcasters, the Arkansas Broadcasters Association, the Kentucky Broadcasters Association and the Associated Press. Paul Freeman Tinkle is President of Thunderbolt Broadcasting.
