= WJZK =

WJZK may refer to:

- WJZK-LP, a low-power radio station (97.3 FM) licensed to serve Ft. Walton Beach, Florida, United States
- WNNP, a radio station (104.3 FM) licensed to serve Richwood, Ohio, United States, which held the call sign WJZK from 1999 to 2009
- WIWF, a radio station (96.9 FM) licensed to serve Charleston, South Carolina, United States, which held the call sign WJZK from 1996 to 1997
- WCDZ, a radio station (95.1 FM) licensed to Dresden, Tennessee, United States, which held the call sign WJZK from 1991 to 1992
