= TSAC =

TSAC may refer to:

- Tennessee Student Assistance Corporation
- The Springfield Anglican College
- TranSouth Athletic Conference
