= New York City Jet Ski Invasion =

Personal watercraft group ride event in New York City

The New York City Jet Ski Invasion is a group ride for personal watercraft held on waterways in New York City. The annual event for jet ski enthusiasts is typically held on the last weekend in June and runs along the east and west sides of Manhattan on the East and Hudson rivers.

NYC Jet Ski Invasion Route
1 Pepsi-Cola sign
2 The Battery
3 Statue of Liberty
4 George Washington Bridge

== Route ==
Prior to the start of the event, participants on personal watercraft gather on the East River near the Pepsi-Cola sign in Long Island City. The route of the Jet Ski Invasion runs south along the East River towards The Battery and Statue of Liberty and then heads north along the Hudson River to the George Washington Bridge. Front line leaders are used to direct the jet ski riders, keep the group together and set a consistent pace of 10 to 25 miles per hour (16 to 40 km/h). It takes about two hours for jet ski riders to complete the route. After the conclusion of the event, some of the participants continue riding and complete a loop around Manhattan via the Harlem River.

== History ==
The first Jet Ski Invasion was organized in 2017 by local jet ski clubs from New York City and Long Island. Initially, the event drew about 200 riders from the local area, but it grew in size in subsequent years and also began attracting participants from Connecticut and Pennsylvania. Approximately 400 jet ski riders participated in the 2021 event. By 2026, participation in the Jet Ski Invasion grew to include about 600 to 800 riders.

Organizers of the Jet Ski Invasion began working with local law enforcement agencies in 2018 and had discussions regarding the safety and security during the event. Logistics for the group ride are challenging due to the number of other vessels using the waterways, which have since grown more crowded with expansion of NYC Ferry service. Jet ski riders are required to hold a boating safety certificate in order to participate in the event, which is accompanied by support boats and vessels from the United States Coast Guard and the New York Police Department Harbor Patrol. Other agencies that have provided maritime support for the event include the New York City Fire Department, New York State Department of Environmental Conservation, New Jersey State Police, Palisades Interstate Parkway Police Department and United States Park Police.

== See also ==
- Tennessee River 600
