= William Martin (merchant) =

American merchant (1806–1859)

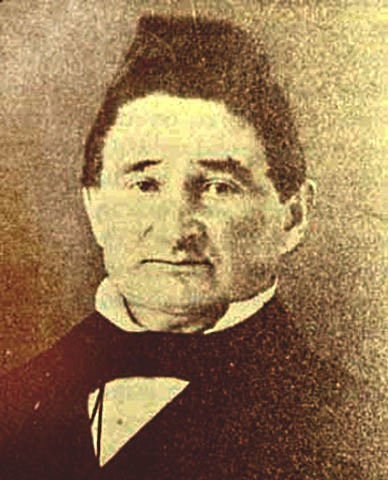
Captain William Martin, 1848

Captain William Martin (January 30, 1806 – January 17, 1859) was an American merchant who is considered the father of the town of Martin in Tennessee. Because of his significant role in the region, residents gave him the name prefix Captain.

== Life ==
Martin was born on January 30, 1806, in Halifax, Virginia. He married Sarah Glass on September 30, 1828. Together with his wife and her parents he moved to Weakley County in 1832, where they initially reported owning eight horses, about five or six slaves, and $2,000 ($62,993 in 2024) in cash. They first settled six miles northeast of Dresden, Tennessee. There they remained until 1838. Martin's parents also came to Weakley, whereupon they made their new home (about nine miles northwest of Dresden) on a hill north of the present East Side Cemetery one and a half miles northeast, which area is now the town of Martin. Together with his wife Sarah, he raised nine children. Three of their sons, George Washington Martin, Thomas Dudley Martin and Marshall Presley Martin, were instrumental in the development of the town of Martin.

Martin was the first to plant tobacco plants in Weakley County in 1831. He made his money by trading and shipping the tobacco to New Orleans. That is why Captain Martin had a vision of a railroad through his adopted county beginning in 1840. Beginning in 1852 Martin lobbied for the Hickman and Obion Railroad to extend its existing rail line from Union City to Hickman accordingly. To expedite this, he personally invested $5,000 ($188,980 in 2024). However, his private property was not sufficient to secure the line construction. As a result, the few citizens in the area were asked to pay a tax for the necessary funds. At the time, he was a very respected man statewide, both economically and politically, which resulted in people paying the tax. In 1857, the Tennessee Supreme Court approved the extension of the railroad through Weakley County.

The line was completed shortly after the start of the American Civil War in 1861. Captain Martin died in 1859, so he never saw his vision of a completed railroad through his adopted county.
