= WCDZ =

Radio station in Dresden, Tennessee

- Dresden, Tennessee; United States
- Broadcast area: Martin, Tennessee
- Frequency: 95.1 MHz
- Branding: Star 95.1

Programming
- Format: Classic hits
- Affiliations: United Stations Radio Networks; Westwood One

Ownership
- Owner: Thunderbolt Broadcasting Company
- Sister stations: KYTN, WCMT, WCMT-FM, WQAK

History
- First air date: November 18, 1991
- Former call signs: WJZK (1991–1992); WGNN (1992–1994)
- Call sign meaning: CD Country (name in the 1990s)

Technical information
- Licensing authority: FCC
- Facility ID: 67055
- Class: C3
- ERP: 25,000 watts
- HAAT: 84 meters (276 ft)
- Transmitter coordinates: 36°15′50″N 88°40′03″W
- Translator: 102.9 W275BF (Martin)

Links
- Public license information: Public file; LMS
- Webcast: Listen live
- Website: www.thunderboltradio.com/star-95-1/

WCDZ (95.1 FM "Star 95.1") is a radio station broadcasting a classic hits format in Dresden, Tennessee. The station is owned by Thunderbolt Broadcasting of Martin, Tennessee. The station maintains a tower in Dresden and studios in Martin, shared with WCMT-AM-FM (1410 AM and 101.3 FM); WCDZ's tower site is also home to WCMT AM's FM translator.

== History ==
WCDZ began broadcasting November 18, 1991 as WJZK. The original format was Lee Abrams' Classic Rock from the Satellite Music Network in Dallas, Texas.

The station was the first in the West Tennessee area to broadcast digitally 24 hours a day.

The station's format changed on March 1, 1992, to a 24-7 Southern Gospel format; the call letters changed to WGNN which stood for the Good News Network.

In 1994, Valley Wide Broadcasting, whose principals included Ray Smith and John Latham of Camden, Tennessee, sold the radio station to Thunderbolt Broadcasting.

After Thunderbolt bought the station, it changed the call letters to WCDZ February 28, 1994. WCDZ carried the Jones Radio Network's CD Country syndicated format and also added the Atlanta Braves and Tennessee Vols sports.

In 1998, the station changed to "Good Time Oldies", also from the Jones Radio Network, playing music from the late 50s to the early 70s, with primary focus on music of the 60s. That change proved to be very successful for the station. On October 8, 2010, WCDZ shifted programming to classic hits and adopted the Star 95.1 moniker. The station abandoned the satellite format in 2013 and now broadcasts with all music programmed locally without personalities.

WCDZ is the local affiliate of the Vol Network for Tennessee Volunteers football and men's basketball.
