= WQAK =

Radio station in Union City, Tennessee

- Union City, Tennessee; United States
- Broadcast area: Jackson TN area
- Frequency: 105.7 MHz
- Branding: The Quake

Programming
- Format: Active rock
- Affiliations: United Stations Radio Networks

Ownership
- Owner: Thunderbolt Broadcasting Company
- Sister stations: KYTN, WCDZ, WCMT, WCMT-FM

History
- First air date: February 10, 1993 (as WLJJ)
- Former call signs: WLJJ (1993–1994); WWUC (1994–1998)
- Call sign meaning: W Q u A K e

Technical information
- Licensing authority: FCC
- Facility ID: 68611
- Class: A
- ERP: 6,000 watts
- HAAT: 94 meters (308 ft)
- Translator: 107.9 W300BY (Union City)

Links
- Public license information: Public file; LMS
- Webcast: Listen live
- Website: www.thunderboltradio.com/the-quake/

WQAK (105.7 FM, "The Quake") is a radio station broadcasting an Active Rock format. Licensed to Union City, Tennessee, United States, the station serves the Jackson TN area and Ken Tenn area. The station is owned by Thunderbolt Broadcasting Company.

== History ==
The station began broadcasting as WLJJ on February 10, 1993 and changed its call letters February 11, 1994 to WWUC, On December 11, 1998 to the current WQAK,

In addition to its alternative rock format, "The Quake" WQAK FM airs Union City high school sports and Tennessee Titans football.

The radio station is owned by Thunderbolt Broadcasting which also operates KYTN-FM 104.9 in Union City, Tennessee and WCMT AM 1410, WCMT-FM 101.3 and WCDZ-FM 95.1 in Martin, Tennessee.

The WQAK-FM and KYTN-FM studios are located at 223 Westgate Drive in Union City, Tennessee. Thunderbolt Broadcasting purchased KYTN (formerly WYVY FM) and WQAK-FM stations December 27, 2005 from Twin States Broadcasting December 27, 2005. WQAK FM 105.7 also broadcasts its programming on 107.9 FM a local channel FM station aka translator.

The station began airing the syndicated Pink Floyd program "Floydian Slip" in July 2021.
