= Martin, Tennessee =

- City
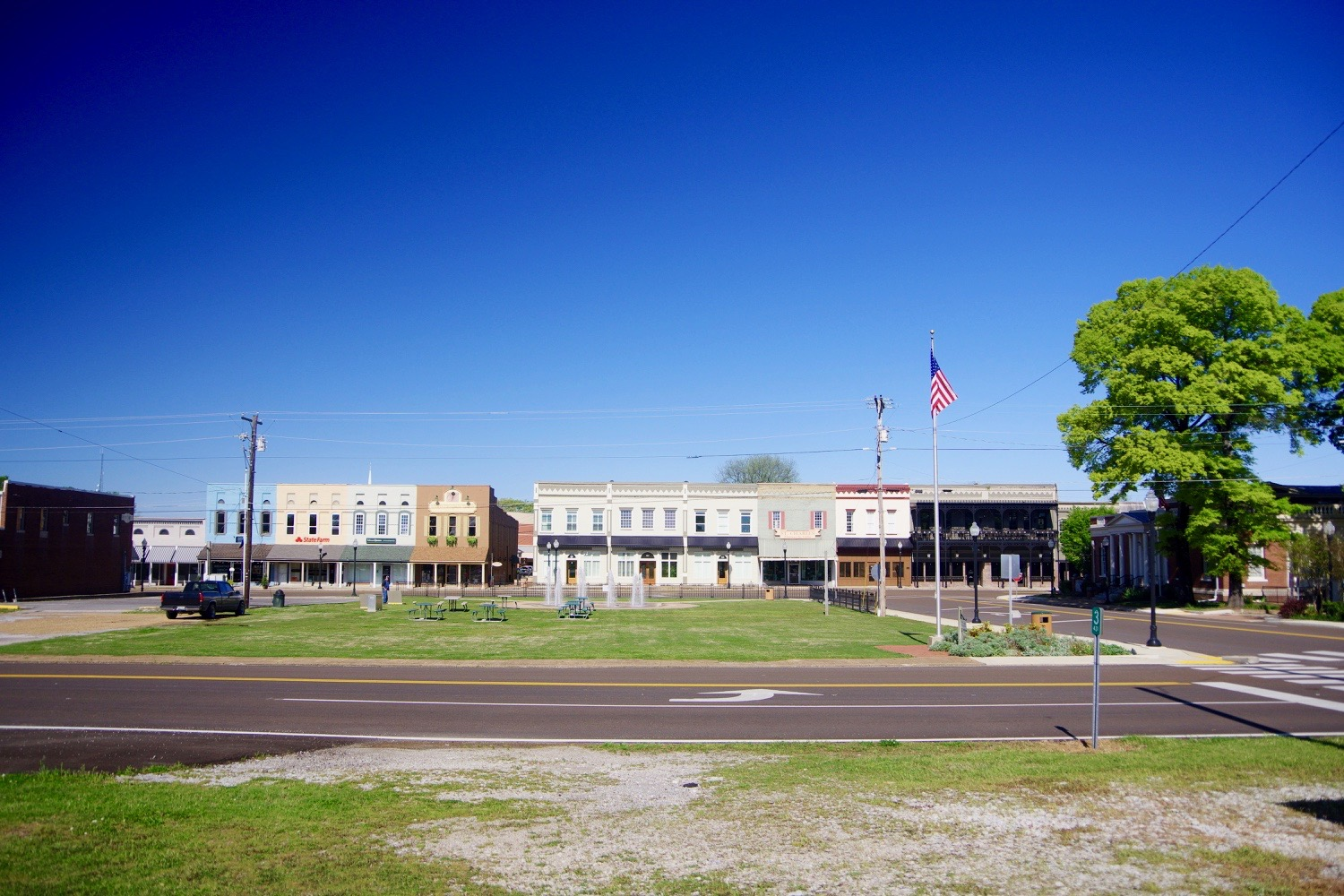
- Businesses along Lindell Street

- Location of Martin in Weakley County, Tennessee
- Coordinates: 36°20′31″N 88°51′6″W
- Country: United States
- State: Tennessee
- County: Weakley

Area
  - Total: 12.45 sq mi (32.24 km^{2})
  - Land: 12.41 sq mi (32.13 km^{2})
  - Water: 0.042 sq mi (0.11 km^{2})
- Elevation: 407 ft (124 m)

Population (2020)
  - Total: 10,825
  - Density: 872.6/sq mi (336.92/km^{2})
- Time zone: UTC-6 (Central (CST))
  - Summer (DST): UTC-5 (CDT)
- ZIP codes: 38237-38238
- Area code: 731
- FIPS code: 47-46240
- GNIS feature ID: 1292789
- Website: http://www.cityofmartin.net/

Martin is a city in Weakley County, Tennessee, United States. The population was 10,825 according to the 2020 census. The city is the home of the University of Tennessee at Martin.

== History ==
Martin is named for Captain William Martin. William Martin was born in Halifax County, Virginia in 1806, and moved to Weakley County, Tennessee with his wife Sarah in 1832. Captain Martin prospered through tobacco farming and began working to establish a railroad connection in what would later become Martin in 1852. It was not until after his death in 1859 that his sons, led primarily by George W. Martin, persuaded the Mississippi Central Railroad to locate a connection with the Nashville and Northwestern Railroad in what would become Martin, Tennessee in 1872.

Martin was initially named Green Briar Glade and then renamed Frost in honor of an official of the Illinois Central Railroad. George W. Martin, M. P. Martin and W. H. Martin sold to the Mississippi Central Railroad on February 11, 1874, for $5. The railroad renamed the area Martin in honor of William Martin and to better advertise the area. Surveyor H. C. Draughon laid out the town on September 22, 1874, and a petition of incorporation was filed by G.W. Martin, A.M. Clemons, and Draughon on September 24. A majority of the 36 residents voted in favor of the incorporation on November 27, and John L. Smith was appointed mayor. B.F. Crawford was elected mayor on February 5, 1875, alongside six aldermen and a constable.

In 1878, a yellow fever outbreak infected 400 of the 500 inhabitants and killed 52. A smallpox epidemic broke out during the tenure of Mayor James E. Kennedy. Concrete sidewalks and gravel streets were built during the mayoral tenure of Wiley Blakemore. The city's sewer system was built under Mayor J.T. Perkins.

Esquire listed Martin as one of the happiest towns in the United States in 1970.

== Geography ==
Martin is located at 36°20′31″N 88°51′6″W (36.341836, -88.851647).

According to the United States Census Bureau, the city has a total area of 12.4 square miles (32 km^{2}), of which 12.4 square miles (32 km^{2}) is land and 0.04 square miles (0.10 km^{2}), or 0.32%, is water.

=== Major roads and highways ===
- U.S. Route 45E (Elm St., Lindell St.)
- State Route 22
- State Route 431 (Main Street, University Street)
- State Route 43 (Skyhawk Parkway)

=== Climate ===
Climate data for Martin, Tennessee (University of Tennessee at Martin) 1991–2020 normals, extremes 1936–present
Month	Jan	Feb	Mar	Apr	May	Jun	Jul	Aug	Sep	Oct	Nov	Dec	Year
Record high °F (°C)	77 (25)	81 (27)	86 (30)	90 (32)	98 (37)	107 (42)	105 (41)	106 (41)	105 (41)	96 (36)	87 (31)	78 (26)	107 (42)
Mean daily maximum °F (°C)	45.9 (7.7)	50.8 (10.4)	59.5 (15.3)	70.2 (21.2)	78.8 (26.0)	86.5 (30.3)	89.8 (32.1)	89.5 (31.9)	83.4 (28.6)	72.4 (22.4)	59.6 (15.3)	49.3 (9.6)	69.6 (20.9)
Daily mean °F (°C)	36.2 (2.3)	40.5 (4.7)	48.7 (9.3)	58.7 (14.8)	68.3 (20.2)	76.3 (24.6)	79.7 (26.5)	78.4 (25.8)	71.5 (21.9)	59.7 (15.4)	48.5 (9.2)	39.8 (4.3)	58.9 (14.9)
Mean daily minimum °F (°C)	26.5 (−3.1)	30.3 (−0.9)	37.8 (3.2)	47.3 (8.5)	57.8 (14.3)	66.2 (19.0)	69.7 (20.9)	67.4 (19.7)	59.6 (15.3)	47.1 (8.4)	37.4 (3.0)	30.2 (−1.0)	48.1 (8.9)
Record low °F (°C)	−18 (−28)	−14 (−26)	−2 (−19)	20 (−7)	31 (−1)	44 (7)	48 (9)	44 (7)	33 (1)	17 (−8)	0 (−18)	−13 (−25)	−18 (−28)
Average precipitation inches (mm)	4.18 (106)	4.74 (120)	5.32 (135)	5.29 (134)	5.66 (144)	4.30 (109)	4.24 (108)	3.45 (88)	3.77 (96)	3.98 (101)	4.48 (114)	5.31 (135)	54.72 (1,390)
Average snowfall inches (cm)	1.2 (3.0)	1.4 (3.6)	0.4 (1.0)	0.0 (0.0)	0.0 (0.0)	0.0 (0.0)	0.0 (0.0)	0.0 (0.0)	0.0 (0.0)	0.0 (0.0)	0.1 (0.25)	0.0 (0.0)	3.1 (7.9)
Average precipitation days (≥ 0.01 in)	10.6	9.7	11.6	10.9	11.9	9.6	8.2	7.7	7.6	8.2	9.4	11.5	116.9
Average snowy days (≥ 0.1 in)	0.9	0.9	0.1	0.0	0.0	0.0	0.0	0.0	0.0	0.0	0.1	0.3	2.3
Source: NOAA

== Demographics ==
Historical population
Census	Pop.	Note	%±
1900	1,730		—
1910	2,228		28.8%
1920	2,837		27.3%
1930	3,300		16.3%
1940	3,587		8.7%
1950	4,082		13.8%
1960	4,750		16.4%
1970	7,781		63.8%
1980	8,898		14.4%
1990	8,600		−3.3%
2000	10,515		22.3%
2010	11,473		9.1%
2020	10,825		−5.6%

=== 2020 census ===
As of the 2020 census, Martin had a population of 10,825, 4,093 households, and 2,049 families residing in the city. The median age was 26.7 years, with 16.8% of residents under the age of 18 and 14.3% who were 65 years of age or older. For every 100 females there were 87.6 males, and for every 100 females age 18 and over there were 83.9 males age 18 and over.

Racial composition as of the 2020 census
Race	Number	Percent
White	8,006	74.0%
Black or African American	1,923	17.8%
American Indian and Alaska Native	18	0.2%
Asian	131	1.2%
Native Hawaiian and Other Pacific Islander	0	0.0%
Some other race	138	1.3%
Two or more races	609	5.6%
Hispanic or Latino (of any race)	329	3.0%

94.2% of residents lived in urban areas, while 5.8% lived in rural areas.

There were 4,093 households in Martin, of which 25.5% had children under the age of 18 living in them. Of all households, 33.5% were married-couple households, 22.5% were households with a male householder and no spouse or partner present, and 36.3% were households with a female householder and no spouse or partner present. About 35.3% of all households were made up of individuals and 11.7% had someone living alone who was 65 years of age or older.

There were 4,643 housing units, of which 11.8% were vacant. The homeowner vacancy rate was 1.4% and the rental vacancy rate was 10.4%.

=== 2000 census ===
At the 2000 census there were 10,515 people, 3,773 households, and 2,029 families living in the city. The population density was 848.9 inhabitants per square mile (327.8/km^{2}). There were 4,106 housing units at an average density of 331.5 per square mile (128.0/km^{2}). The racial makeup of the city was 66.32% White, 25.62% African American, 0.08% Native American, 4.13% Asian, 0.97% from other races, and 0.89% from two or more races. Hispanic or Latino of any race were 3.82%.

Of the 3,773 households 24.0% had children under the age of 18 living with them, 41.1% were married couples living together, 9.9% had a female householder with no husband present, and 46.2% were non-families. 34.1% of households were one person and 11.5% were one person aged 65 or older. The average household size was 2.20 and the average family size was 2.87.

The age distribution was 16.7% under the age of 18, 32.6% from 18 to 24, 21.4% from 25 to 44, 16.4% from 45 to 64, and 12.9% 65 or older. The median age was 26 years. For every 100 females, there were 89.9 males. For every 100 females age 18 and over, there were 86.0 males.

The median household income was $26,493 and the median family income was $38,648. Males had a median income of $29,836 versus $22,219 for females. The per capita income for the city was $15,184. About 15.8% of families and 27.1% of the population were below the poverty line, including 27.7% of those under age 18 and 15.7% of those age 65 or over.

== Government and politics ==
Mayors of Martin, Tennessee
#	Party	Mayor	Term start	Term end	Note	Reference
1		John Smith	1874	1875	Appointed	
2		Baldwin Crawford	1875	1877	Elected	
3		L.A. Blake	1877	1878	Died of yellow fever	
4		J.P. Beach	1878	1880		
5		J.M. Ridgeway	1880	1886		
6		John L. Brooks	1886	1894		
7		Ruffan R. Aycock	1894	1896		
8		James E. Kennedy	1896	1900		
9		George E. Bowden	1900	1902	Brother of Thomas A. Bowden	
10		Thomas A. Bowden	1902	1902	Brother of George E. Bowden; Died two months into term	
11		Wiley B. Blakemore	1902	1908		
12		J.T. Perkins	1908	1914		
13		A.B. Adam	1914	1918		
14		J.D. Jones	1918	1920		
15		George P. Hurt	1920	1922		
16		D. Walter Harper	1922	1928		
17		George M. Brooks	1928	1930		
18		L.G. McMillion	1930	1931	Resigned due to poor health	
19		George M. Brooks	1931	1932		
20		L.A. Elliott	1932	1934		
21		George M. Brooks	1934	1939		
22		Frank Smith	1939	1940		
23		George M. Brooks	1940	1950		
24		Jack Vincent	1950	1954		
25		Milburn Gardner	1954	1957	Died in office	
26		Max Burchard	1957	1958		
27		Jack Vincent	1958	1962		
28		Doug Murphy	1962	1966		
29		Cliff Weldon	1966	1974		
30		Tom Copeland	1974	1976		
31		H.C. Brundige	1976	1982		
32		Tom Copeland	1982	1984		
33		Virginia Weldon	1984	1988	Wife of Cliff Weldon	
34		Bob Peeler	1988	1990		
35		Carl Savage	1990	1992		
36		Larry Taylor	1992	2002		
37		Randy Brundige	2002	Present		

=== ZIP codes ===
The ZIP codes used in the Martin area are 38237 and 38238, with the latter reserved for the University of Tennessee at Martin.

== Media ==
=== Newspapers ===
- Weakley County Press

=== Radio ===
- WCMT-AM 1410 100.5FM
- WCMT-FM 101.3
- WUTM-FM 90.3
- (WCDZ FM 95.1 and 102.9FM)
- WCMT-AM 1410 "your best friend"

== Points of interest ==
- University of Tennessee at Martin
- University of Tennessee Botanical Gardens
- Westview High School (Tennessee)

== Notable people ==
- Chad Clifton - NFL player for the Green Bay Packers
- Leonard Hamilton - UTM alumnus, men's basketball coach, Florida State University
- Justin Harrell - NFL player for the Green Bay Packers
- Crystal Renee Hayslett - Actress and costume designer, known for BET's Sistas and BET+'s Zatima
- Lester Hudson - UTM alumnus, NBA player
- Pat Summitt - UTM alumna, Head Coach emerita, UT Knoxville Lady Vols Basketball
- Jerry Reese - UTM alumnus, General Manager, New York Giants (football)
- Hayden White - narrative historian
- Lin Dunn - UTM alumna, first coach and general manager for the Seattle Storm (basketball)
- Van Jones - UTM alumnus, CNN commentator, Emmy award winner
- Ty Simpson - Westview alumnus, quarterback for the Los Angeles Rams

== See also ==
- List of cities in Tennessee
- Tennessee Soybean Festival

== Works cited ==
=== Newspapers ===
- Lewis, Bob (June 15, 1984). "Martin picks mayor's widow as successor". The Jackson Sun. p. 6A – via Newspapers.com.

=== Web ===
- "A Brief History of Martin". University of Tennessee at Martin. Archived from the original on February 25, 2025.
- "Our Founders". Martin, Tennessee. January 9, 2023. Archived from the original on October 8, 2024.
- "The 1st Mayor of Martin". Martin, Tennessee. February 9, 2023. Archived from the original on February 25, 2025.
- "Yellow Fever". Martin, Tennessee. January 16, 2023. Archived from the original on September 13, 2024.
