= Tennessee Soybean Festival =

- Dates: first week of September
- Location: Martin, Tennessee
- Founded: 1993
- Website: http://www.tnsoybeanfestival.org/

The Tennessee Soybean Festival in Martin, Tennessee is one of several local festivals which occur each year throughout the state. Beginning the first week of September, the festival celebrates the historical impact of the soybean crop on the economics of West Tennessee and specifically the City of Martin and Weakley County. Each year the festival features several locally oriented events, various concerts, the Miss Soybean Festival Pageant (a qualifying event for the Miss Tennessee Pageant), the football home-opener for the University of Tennessee at Martin as well as a street fair.

The festival kicks off with the Mayor's Luncheon.

No festival was held in 2020, due to the COVID-19 pandemic.
