= List of Tennessee state forests =

There are 15 state forests in the U.S. state of Tennessee.

== Tennessee state forests ==
Name (by alphabetical order)	Location (of main entrance)
Bledsoe State Forest	Bledsoe County
Cedars Of Lebanon State Forest	Wilson County
Chickasaw State Forest	Hardeman County
Chuck Swan State Forest	Union County
Franklin State Forest	Marion County
John Tully State Forest	Lauderdale County
Lewis State Forest	Lewis County
Lone Mountain State Forest	Morgan County
Martha Sundquist State Forest	Cocke County
Natchez Trace State Forest	Henderson County
Pickett State Forest	Pickett County
Prentice Cooper State Forest	Marion County
Scott State Forest	Scott County
Standing Stone State Forest	Overton County
Stewart State Forest	Stewart County

== See also ==
- List of national forests of the United States
