= Damon Rivers Headden =

American politician

Damon Rivers Headden (1926 – 1958) was majority leader of the Tennessee House of Representatives from 1955 to 1958.

A Democrat from Ridgely, Headden represented a district from the northern part of West Tennessee. One of his major interests was increasing the state's investment in its properties surrounding Reelfoot Lake, both as a conservation measure and as a way of stimulating economic development in what was a relatively impoverished area of the state. This work included seeking to end the practice of selling game fish taken from the lake and directing funding towards Reelfoot Lake State Park. Headden's first term began in 1953, and he was re-elected twice. He was the floor leader of the Tennessee House of Representatives for two legislative sessions, sharing the duty for the 79th General Assembly which began in 1955 with Eugene Collins, and then holding the role by himself for the following legislative session which began in 1957.

Headden died on July 3, 1958 of spinal meningitis. The Memphis Press-Scimitar, in an obituary of Headden, described him as "one of the rising political figures" in Tennessee. Outside of politics, Headden managed the family cotton farm and lumber business after the death of his father in 1953. Headden's father, Henry Damon Headden, was a former member of the Tennessee legislature.
