= Tennessee login law =

On June 1, 2011, lawmakers in the US state of Tennessee passed a bill that makes sharing login information for sites that provide music and movies, such as Netflix and Napster, illegal. The law, pushed for by recording industry professionals, is the first of its kind in that it is actually an update for a bill originally existing to punish cable theft now targeting the Internet.

While the law punishes people for sharing passwords, it is really aimed at those sharing and selling their passwords in large quantities – up to $500 in theft resulting in a misdemeanor, and anything else after that a felony.

== Reaction ==
Initial reaction to the law was negative from social network users. Many see the issue in the same light as with music piracy.
