= WCMT (AM) =

- Martin, Tennessee; United States
- Broadcast area: Jackson, Tennessee, area
- Frequency: 1410 kHz

Programming
- Format: News–talk
- Affiliations: CBS News Radio; Fox News Radio; Premiere Networks; Radio America; Westwood One

Ownership
- Owner: Thunderbolt Broadcasting Company
- Sister stations: KYTN, WCDZ, WCMT-FM, WQAK

History
- First air date: June 16, 1957
- Call sign meaning: Weakley County; Martin, Tennessee

Technical information
- Licensing authority: FCC
- Facility ID: 67054
- Class: D
- Power: 700 watts day 58 watts night
- Transmitter coordinates: 36°21′45.00″N 88°50′57.00″W
- Translators: 92.7 W224DR (Greenfield); 96.1 W241BE (Dresden); 99.7 W259BT (South Fulton); 100.5 W263BF (Martin); 103.3 W277CA (Union City)

Links
- Public license information: Public file; LMS
- Webcast: Listen live
- Website: www.thunderboltradio.com/wcmt-talk-and-news-you-can-use/

WCMT (1410 kHz) is an AM radio station broadcasting a news–talk format. Licensed to Martin, Tennessee, United States, the station serves the Northwest Tennessee and Southwest Kentucky radio market from Paducah, Kentucky to Jackson, Tennessee. The station is owned by Thunderbolt Broadcasting Company and features programing from CBS News Radio, Fox News Radio, Premiere Networks, Radio America, and Westwood One.

WCMT began broadcasting June 16, 1957, when J. T. Sudbury of Blytheville, Arkansas placed WCMT on the air. It has remained in the same location since the station began broadcasting.

WCMT's early success is attributed to the late Dwight A. "Duke" Drumm who arrived on the scene in 1959 and worked for twenty years doing practically every job in the station. Herb Cathey was a long time air personality who also served as an engineer for the station.

In 1968 Drumm persuaded Sudbury to add an FM station to the airwaves and WCMT-FM (then 101.7) joined WCMT. The station later upgraded its power and changed frequency and is now on 101.3 FM.

In 1994, Thunderbolt Broadcasting purchased 95.1 WGNN-FM, formerly WJZK-FM, and changed the call letters to WCDZ-FM. The studios were moved from Dresden, Tennessee to the Martin studios.

In December 2005 Thunderbolt Radio purchased Twin States Broadcasting stations 104.9 KYTN-FM and 105.7 WQAK-FM.

Logo before 92.7, 96.1, and 103.3 translator sign ons

WCMT has expanded its nighttime coverage by adding extra FM channels located in neighboring towns. These "translators" broadcast on 92.7 FM, 96.1 FM, 99.7 FM, 100.5 FM and 103.3 FM.

== Programming ==
Programming includes: Local News, Rush Limbaugh, Sean Hannity, Dave Ramsey, Jim Bohannon, George Noory, Art Bell, America in the Morning, First Light, Warren Eckstein with The Pet Show, Kim Komando, Handel on the Law and Good Times in the Morning a local "town hall" meeting every morning from 6-9am.

WCMT's Good Times in the Morning program can be heard on 1410 WCMT as well as 101.3 WCMT FM and FM channels on local channel FM stations (aka translators) 92.7, 96.1, 99.7 and 100.5 and 103.3. WCMT's call letters stand for "Weakley County Martin, Tennessee" and the station is also known as "The Voice of Weakley County."

Paul Freeman Tinkle, Thunderbolt Broadcasting president began his career at WCMT as the janitor of the radio station in 1970 while he was a sophomore at Martin High School (now Westview High School.) A short time later he became a board operator when another announcer couldn't come work. He later worked in Union City and McKenzie, Tennessee and Mayfield and Paducah, Kentucky before returning in 1981 where he later became a partner in Thunderbolt Broadcasting.

Cindy Stewart Prince has worked at WCMT since 1979 and serves as assistant to the president. Tinkle's son, Jordan Tinkle, now working at radio stations in Nashville, began his start at WCMT at the age of 10 working as a "take out the trash" boy and became a board operator a short time later. He is also believed to have been the youngest person to work "press row" providing color and stats on a TSSAA state tournament basketball game. He now is a producer of a sports talk show.

1410 WCMT is a news and sports station. Local news can be heard around the clock while national news is heard hourly.

WCMT is owned by Thunderbolt Broadcasting and is located at 1410 North Lindell Street in Martin, Tennessee and also owns and operates WCMT-FM licensed to South Fulton, TN and WCDZ-FM Dresden, TN with studios co-located with WCMT. Thunderbolt Broadcasting also own WQAK-FM and KYTN-FM in Union City, Tennessee. WCMT simulcasts (duplicates) its programming on Local Channel FM stations aka translators 92.7, 96.1, 99.7, 100.5 and 103.3. WCMT may be the only AM station that has five L C F M stations (aka translators) rebroadcasting its local community programming to areas that include, Bradford, Dresden, Dyer, Dukedom, Fulton, Gleason, Greenfield, Kenton, Palmersville, Rives, Troy, South Fulton, Union City and other communities.

WCMT is a member of the International Broadcaster's Idea Bank, the National Association of Broadcasters, the Tennessee Association of Broadcasters, the Arkansas Broadcaster's Association, the Kentucky Broadcaster's Association and a number of chamber of commerce associations in the Ken Tenn area. Mr. Tinkle has previously served as an NAB radio board member representing Arkansas and Tennessee. Tinkle also served as President of the Tennessee Associated Press Board of Directors, Tennessee Radio Hall of Fame Board of Directors and President of the Tennessee Association of Broadcaster's board of directors. He is a lifetime member of the Tennessee Association of Broadcasters.

In 2005, WCMT was named an NAB "Crystal" award winner for community service, has been a Marconi finalist and is a recipient of the Weakley County Chamber of Commerce Business of the Year. Mr. Tinkle was named "Weakley Countian" of the Year by the Weakley County Chamber of Commerce.
