= Citizens for Home Rule =

Citizens for Home Rule (CHR) is a Tennessee-based private property owners' rights advocacy organization which opposes coercive annexations by cities and supports the right of trial by jury. It was chartered in 1980 as a not-for-profit corporation under Tennessee law. CHR is the largest independent, citizen-based property rights organization in Tennessee.

The organization has filed several lawsuits challenging annexations by the city of Knoxville. As of 2007, CHR had not won any of these legal challenges, but its president said "quite a number of annexations" had been "dropped and rescinded" as a result of CHR's activities.

Circa 2000, CHR underwent an internal dispute during which its board of directors split into two separate factions that each claimed legal authority to direct the organization.

In 2008, CHR led a successful petition drive to get a referendum to allow sale of liquor by the drink in unincorporated areas of Knox County. The November 2008 referendum passed. The organization sought the referendum on the expectation that legalizing liquor by the drink in unincorporated areas would eliminate one motive for municipal annexations in the county. Earlier, some restaurant operators had voluntarily requested annexation by the city of Knoxville, where liquor sales were permitted, so that they could sell liquor. After the referendum, state officials said they could not process applications for alcoholic beverage permits from businesses in unincorporated areas of Knox County due to a provision in Tennessee law prohibiting sales of liquor by the drink in any county district of which sections had been annexed by a city, a provision that was interpreted to apply to all of unincorporated Knox County. Special legislation, applying only to Knox County, was enacted by the Tennessee General Assembly in 2009 to amend state statutes to allow liquor-by-the-drink sales throughout the county.

In 2005 Citizens for Home Rule joined a political fight to prevent Hendersonville in Sumner County from annexing the adjacent neighborhood of Arrowhead.
