= Geography of Tennessee =

The U.S. state of Tennessee is geographically diverse, with varying terrains and several distinct physiographic regions. Its landforms range from the Blue Ridge Mountains in the eastern part of the state to flat and fertile plains along the Mississippi River. The state is geographically, legally, culturally, and economically divided into three Grand Divisions: East Tennessee, Middle Tennessee, and West Tennessee.

== Overview ==
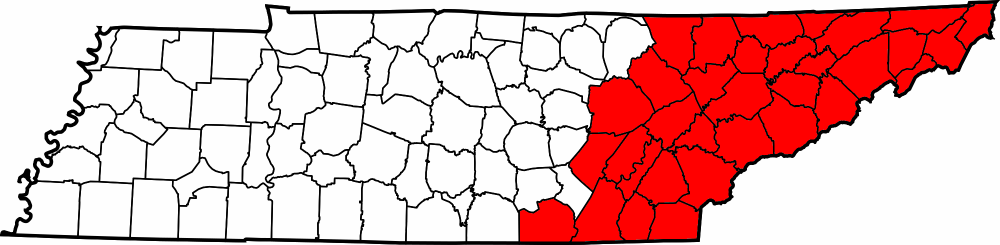
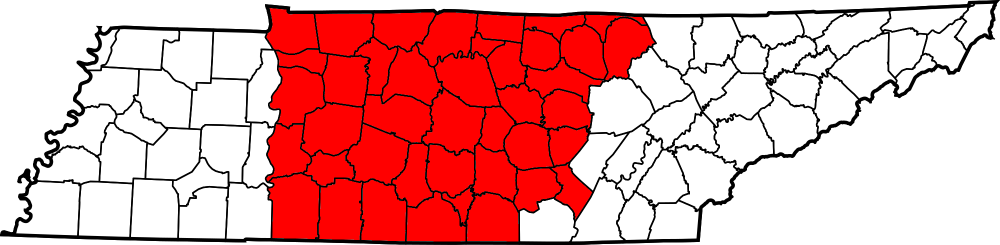
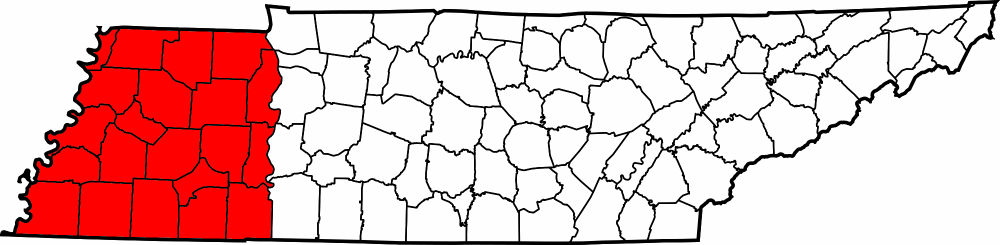
Maps of the Grand Divisions of Tennessee, with East Tennessee at the top, Middle Tennessee in the center, and West Tennessee at the bottom.

Tennessee is in the Southeastern United States. Most of the state is considered part of the Upland South, and the eastern third is part of Appalachia. Tennessee covers roughly 42,143 square miles (109,150 km^{2}), of which 926 square miles (2,400 km^{2}), or 2.2%, is water. It is the 16th smallest state in terms of land area. The state is about 440 miles (710 km) long from east to west and 112 miles (180 km) wide from north to south. Tennessee is geographically, culturally, economically, and legally divided into three Grand Divisions: East Tennessee, Middle Tennessee, and West Tennessee. As culturally and historically distinct regions, the Grand Divisions are sometimes called "The Three Tennessees". Tennessee borders eight other states: Kentucky and Virginia to the north, North Carolina to the east, Georgia, Alabama, and Mississippi on the south, and Arkansas and Missouri on the west. It is tied with Missouri as the state bordering the most other states. It is trisected by the Tennessee River, and its geographical center is in Murfreesboro, the state's sixth-largest city. The boundary between Eastern and Central Time passes across the Cumberland Plateau through the state.

== Borders ==
Tennessee's eastern boundary roughly follows the highest crests of the Blue Ridge Mountains, and the Mississippi River forms its western boundary. Due to flooding of the Mississippi River that has changed its path, the state's western boundary deviates from the river in some places. Neither the northern nor the southern border of Tennessee follows a geographic feature. The northern border was originally defined as the parallel 36°30′ north and the Royal Colonial Boundary of 1665, but due to faulty surveys, the border begins north of this line in the east, and to the west, gradually veers north with multiple minute shifts. Once at the Tennessee River in the western part of the state, the border shifts south onto the actual 36°30′ parallel. An 1818 survey erroneously placed the state's southern border 1 mile (1.6 km) south of the 35th parallel; Georgia legislators continue to dispute this placement, as it prevents Georgia from accessing the Tennessee River.

== Topography ==
Marked by a diversity of landforms and topographies, Tennessee features six principal physiographic provinces, from east to west, which are part of three larger regions: the Blue Ridge Mountains, the Ridge-and-Valley Appalachians, and the Cumberland Plateau, part of the Appalachian Mountains; the Highland Rim and Nashville Basin, part of the Interior Low Plateaus of the Interior Plains; and the East Gulf Coastal Plain, part of the Atlantic Plains. Minor regions include the southern tip of the Cumberland Mountains, the Western Tennessee Valley, and the Mississippi Alluvial Plain. The state's highest point is Kuwohi, at 6,643 feet (2,025 m) above sea level. Kuwohi is the highest point on the Appalachian Trail and the third-highest peak in the United States east of the Mississippi River. The state's lowest point, 178 feet (54 m), is on the Mississippi River at the Mississippi state line in Memphis. Tennessee is home to the most caves in the United States, with more than 10,000 documented.

=== Blue Ridge Mountains ===
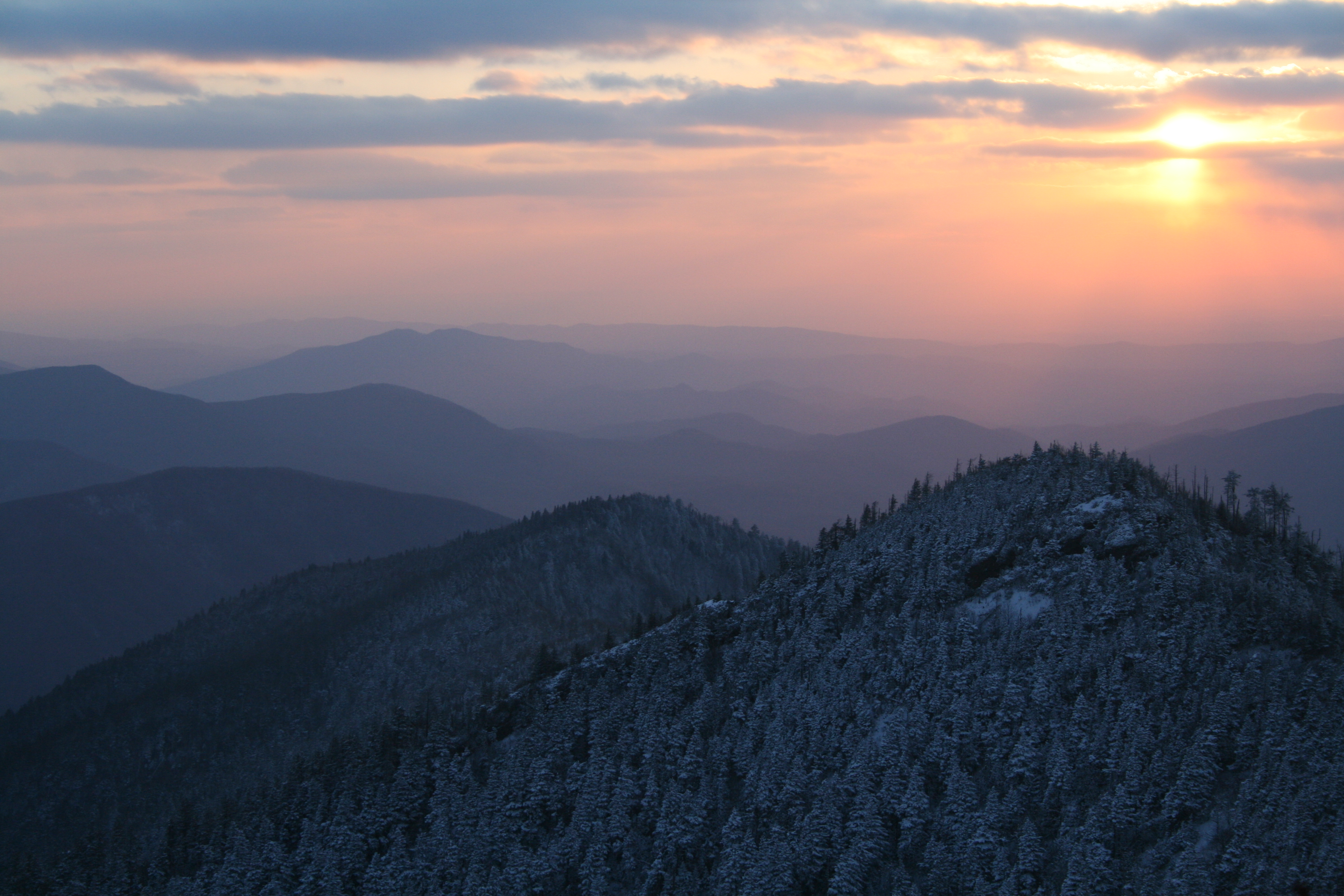
View from atop Mount Le Conte in the Great Smoky Mountains National Park, one of the highest mountains east of the Mississippi River, at 6,593 feet (2,010 m)

The western Blue Ridge Mountains lie within Tennessee's eastern edge. This range is characterized by towering mountains and jumbled terrains, and is divided into several subranges, namely the Great Smoky Mountains, the Bald Mountains, the Unicoi Mountains, the Unaka Mountains, and the Iron Mountains. The average elevation of the Blue Ridge Mountains in Tennessee is 5,000 feet (1,500 m) above sea level. The state's border with North Carolina roughly follows the highest peaks of this range, including Kuwohi, the state's highest point. The Blue Ridge area was never more than sparsely populated, and today most of it is protected by the Cherokee National Forest, the Great Smoky Mountains National Park, and several federal wilderness areas and state parks.

=== Ridge-and-Valley Appalachians ===
Stretching west from the Blue Ridge Mountains for about 55 miles (89 km) are the Ridge-and-Valley Appalachians, also known as the Tennessee Valley (Note: Not to be confused with the Tennessee Valley, the drainage basin of the Tennessee River, which covers most of this region) or Great Valley of East Tennessee. This area of Tennessee consists of numerous linear parallel ridges and valleys that trend northeast to southwest, the general direction of the entire Appalachian range. Most of these ridges are low, but some of the higher ones are commonly called mountains. Most of this province is coterminous with the Great Appalachian Valley, where the valleys become broader and the ridges lower. In this region are numerous towns and three of the state's urban areas: Knoxville and Chattanooga, the state's third and fourth-largest cities, respectively; and the Tri-Cities: Bristol, Johnson City, and Kingsport. Numerous tributaries join to form the Tennessee River in the Ridge and Valley Region.

=== Cumberland Plateau and Cumberland Mountains ===
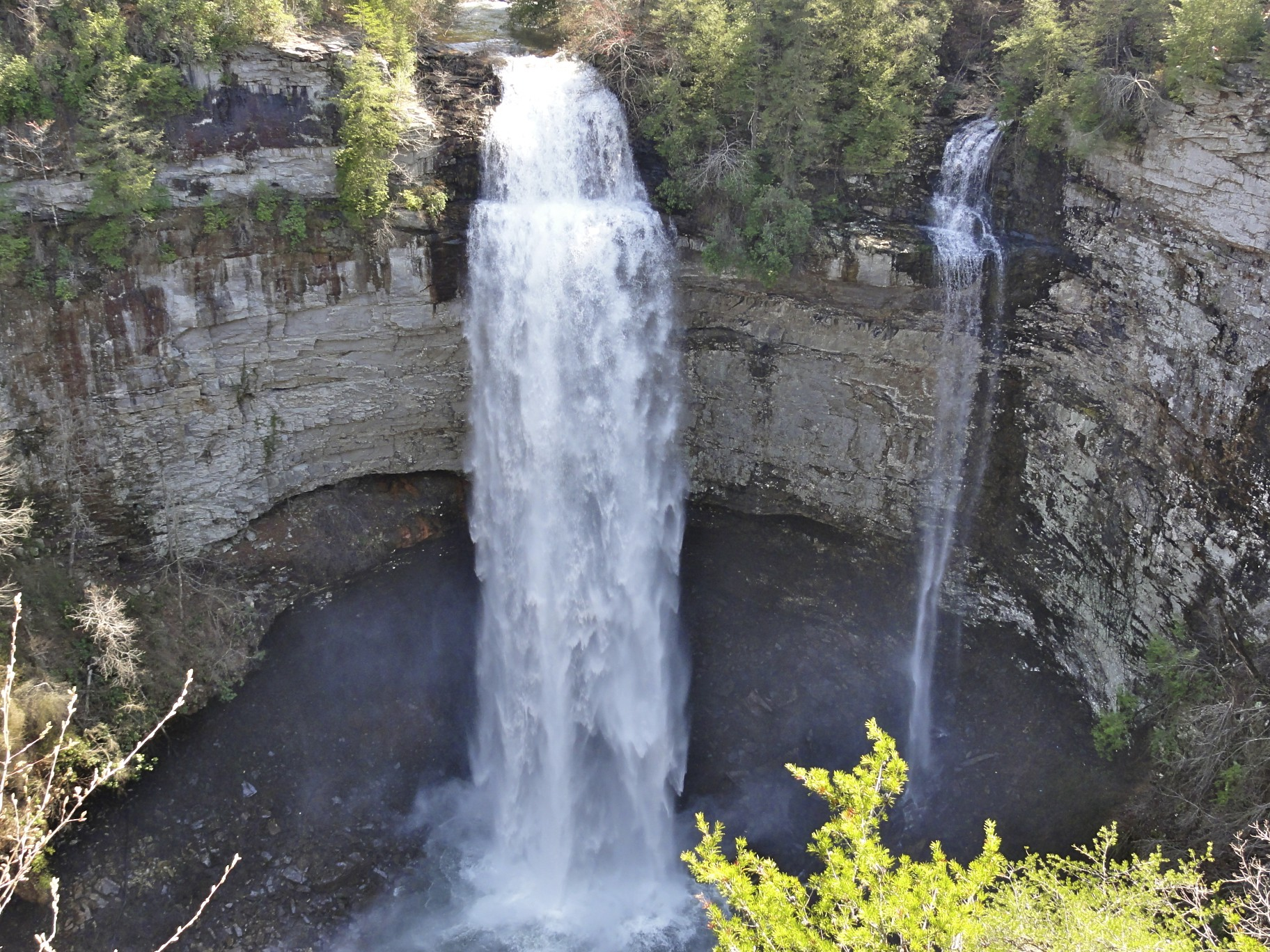
Fall Creek Falls, one of the tallest waterfalls in the eastern United States, is located on the Cumberland Plateau

The Cumberland Plateau rises to the west of the Tennessee Valley. This landform is part of the larger Appalachian Plateau, and is mostly covered by flat-topped tablelands. The elevation of the Cumberland Plateau ranges from about 1,500 to 2,500 feet (460 to 760 m) above sea level, with an average elevation of approximately 2,000 feet (610 m). The eastern part of the plateau is, on average, higher than the western part, and most of the water on the Plateau drains to the west into the Cumberland River. The plateau's eastern edge is relatively distinct, but the western escarpment is irregular, with several long, crooked stream valleys separated by rocky cliffs that run into the interior of the plateau and contain numerous waterfalls. The Cumberland Mountains, with peaks above 3,500 feet (1,100 m), comprise the northeastern part of the Appalachian Plateau in Tennessee, and the southeastern part of the Cumberland Plateau is divided by the largely undeviating Sequatchie Valley. The boundary between East and Middle Tennessee straddles the top of the Cumberland Plateau, as does the boundary between Eastern and Central Time.

=== Highland Rim and Nashville Basin ===
West of the Cumberland Plateau is the Highland Rim, an elevated plain that surrounds the Nashville Basin. Both of these physiographic provinces are part of the Interior Low Plateaus of the larger Interior Plains. The Highland Rim is Tennessee's largest geographic region, and is often divided into the Eastern and Western Highland Rim. The Eastern Highland Rim is characterized by relatively level plains dotted by rolling hills, and averages about 1,000 feet (300 m) above sea level. The Western Highland Rim and western parts of the Nashville Basin are covered by a mix of uneven rounded knobs with steep ravines and meandering streams in between. Elevations in the Western Highland Rim range from approximately 900 feet (270 m) along the eastern edge to 700 feet (210 m) at the western escarpment.

Much of the Nashville basin is relatively level, and supports rich, fertile farmland and a great diversity of natural wildlife. It averages about 600 feet (180 m) above sea level, although elevations vary greatly, with some hills reaching higher than the Eastern Highland Rim. Porous limestone bedrock underlies the Nashville Basin and much of the Eastern Highland Rim very close to the surface. These areas form karst, containing many caves, sinkholes, depressions, and underground streams. Nashville is in the northwestern corner of the Basin, and most of its suburbs radiate outward to the south, southeast, and east, owing to its geography. Clarksville, the state's fifth largest city, sits in the northwestern Highland Rim.

To the west of the Highland Rim is a narrow region known as the Western Tennessee Valley, which consists of about 10 miles (16 km) in width of hilly land that runs along the banks of the Tennessee River. The Tennessee River forms the boundary between Middle and West Tennessee here. Most geographers do not include this region as a major physiographic province of Tennessee. Some maps place the portion of this region west of the Tennessee River as part of the Gulf Coastal Plain; however this is inaccurate, as it is not part of the drainage basin of the Mississippi River.

=== Gulf Coastal Plain and Mississippi embayment ===
West of the Tennessee River is the Gulf Coastal Plain, a broad area that begins at the Gulf of Mexico and extends northward into southern Illinois, gradually losing elevation westward. In Tennessee, this plain consists of two distinct sections. (Note: Many maps of the state do not divide this physiographic province into subregions.) From the east, the plain begins with low rolling hills and wide stream valleys, known as the West Tennessee Highlands, or Uplands, and gradually levels out to the west. The flat western part of the plain contains extremely fertile soils, and is one of the most productive cotton producing regions in the country. These parts also contain thick and fertile loess, and end at steep bluffs overlooking the Mississippi embayment. This is the westernmost physiographic division of Tennessee, and is part of the larger Mississippi Alluvial Plain. This flat strip, commonly known as the Mississippi Bottoms, ranges from 10 to 14 miles (16 to 23 km) wide, and has an elevation of less than 300 feet (91 m). It consists of lowlands, floodplains, and swamplands, and is sometimes considered part of the Mississippi Delta region. Memphis is in the southwestern corner of the Gulf Coastal Plain, and is West Tennessee's most populous city. All of West Tennessee is part of the Jackson Purchase historical region, and it is the least populated of the state's Grand Divisions.

== Geology ==
Geological formations in Tennessee largely correspond with the state's topographic features, and, in general, decrease in age from east to west. Most of the Blue Ridge Mountains in the east were formed during the Precambrian era, and contain the state's oldest rocks, igneous strata that is more than 1 billion years old. Most of the southern Blue Ridge Mountains are composed of Precambrian granite and sedimentary rocks, and Cambrian strata that have been altered by metamorphism. Most of the formations in East and Middle Tennessee consist of strata deposited during the Paleozoic era. Shale and carbonate rocks that formed during the Ordovician period are found in the Nashville Basin, Ridge-and-Valley region, and the Sequatchie Valley. The inner part of the Nashville Basin is a geological dome that was uplifted between 300 and 400 million years ago during the Carboniferous and Devonian periods. Devonian and Silurian strata are found in the Western Tennessee Valley and in small patches in the Western Highland Rim. The Highland Rim formed during the Mississippian era, and is underlain by soluble limestone bedrock that has formed karst, with patches of chert, shale, and sandstone. The Cumberland Plateau was formed during the Pennsylvanian period about 300 million years ago, and consists predominantly of sandstone, silt, and shale, with an abundance of coal. The eastern part of the Gulf Coastal Plain is composed of Mesozoic Cretaceous; most of the plain to the west was deposited during the Cenozoic Tertiary era. The youngest geological formations in Tennessee are sands and silts deposited during the current Quaternary period, and are located within the Mississippi Alluvial Plain and the valleys of rivers that drain into the Mississippi River.

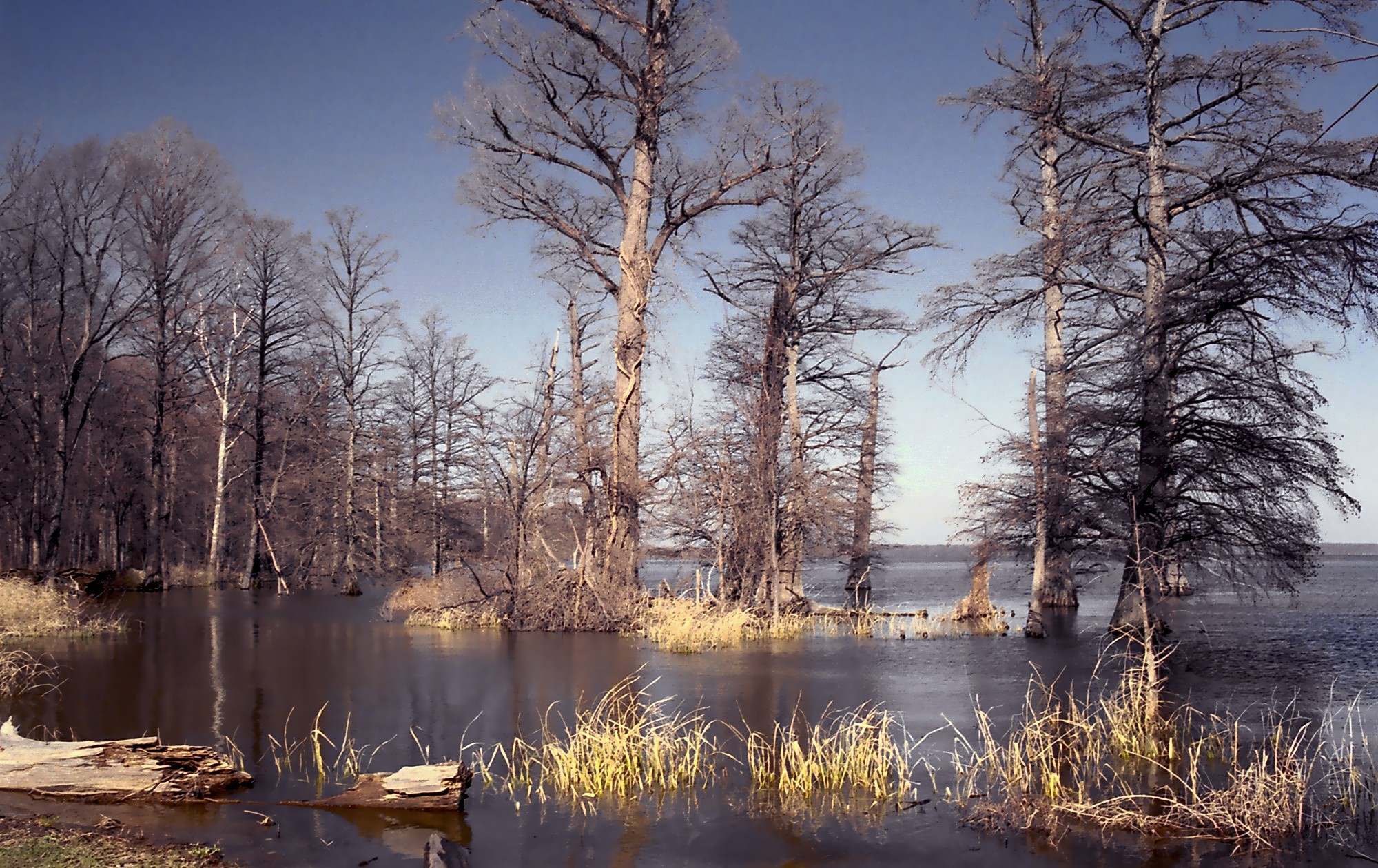
Reelfoot Lake in northwestern Tennessee was formed by the 1811–1812 New Madrid earthquakes

Devonian and Silurian strata are found in the Western Tennessee Valley and in small patches in the Western Highland Rim, formed 360 to 420 million years ago. The Highland Rim formed during the Mississippian era about 350 million years ago, and is underlain by soluble limestone bedrock that has formed karst, with patches of chert, shale, and sandstone. and the Cumberland Plateau was formed during the Pennsylvanian period about 300 million years ago. It consists predominantly of sandstone, silt, and shale, with an abundance of coal. The eastern part of the Gulf Coastal Plain is composed of Mesozoic Cretaceous strata that appeared between 66 and 145 million years ago; most of the plain to the west was deposited during the Cenozoic Tertiary era between 2.6 and 66 million years ago. The youngest geological formations in Tennessee are sands and silts deposited during the current Quaternary period in the last 2.6 million years, and are located within the Mississippi Alluvial Plain and the valleys of rivers that drain into the Mississippi River.

Tennessee is considered seismically active and contains two major seismic zones, although destructive earthquakes rarely occur in the state. The Eastern Tennessee seismic zone spans the entirety of East Tennessee from northwestern Alabama to southwestern Virginia. The region is considered one of the most seismically active zones in the Southeastern United States, and frequently produces low-magnitude earthquakes. The New Madrid seismic zone is located in the northwestern part of the state. This seismic zone produced a series of devastating earthquakes between December 1811 and February 1812 that formed Reelfoot Lake near Tiptonville.

== Hydrology ==
The state is drained by three major rivers, the Tennessee, Cumberland, and Mississippi. The Tennessee River begins at the juncture of the Holston and French Broad rivers in Knoxville, flows southwest to Chattanooga, and exits into Alabama before reemerging in the western part of the state and flowing north into Kentucky. Major tributaries of the Tennessee River include the Clinch, Little Tennessee, Hiwassee, Sequatchie, Elk, Beech, Buffalo, Duck, and Big Sandy rivers. The Cumberland River flows through the north-central part of the state, emerging in the northeastern Highland Rim, passing through Nashville and the northern part of the Nashville Basin before turning northwest to Clarksville and entering Kentucky west of the Tennessee River. Its principal branches in Tennessee are the Obey, Caney Fork, Stones, Harpeth, and Red rivers. The Mississippi River forms the state's western boundary, where Memphis lies. Its tributaries are the Obion, Forked Deer, Hatchie, Loosahatchie, and Wolf rivers. The Tennessee Valley Authority (TVA) and U.S. Army Corps of Engineers operate many hydroelectric dams on the Tennessee and Cumberland rivers and their tributaries. These dams form many large reservoirs throughout the state.

About half the state's land area is in the Tennessee Valley drainage basin of the Tennessee River. The Cumberland River basin covers the northern half of Middle Tennessee and a small portion of East Tennessee. A small part of north-central Tennessee in Sumner, Macon, and Clay Counties is in the Green River watershed. All three of these basins are tributaries of the Ohio River watershed. Most of West Tennessee is in the Lower Mississippi River watershed. The entirety of the state is in the Mississippi River watershed, except for a small sliver in Bradley and Polk Counties traversed by the Conasauga River, which is part of the Mobile Bay watershed.

== Ecology ==
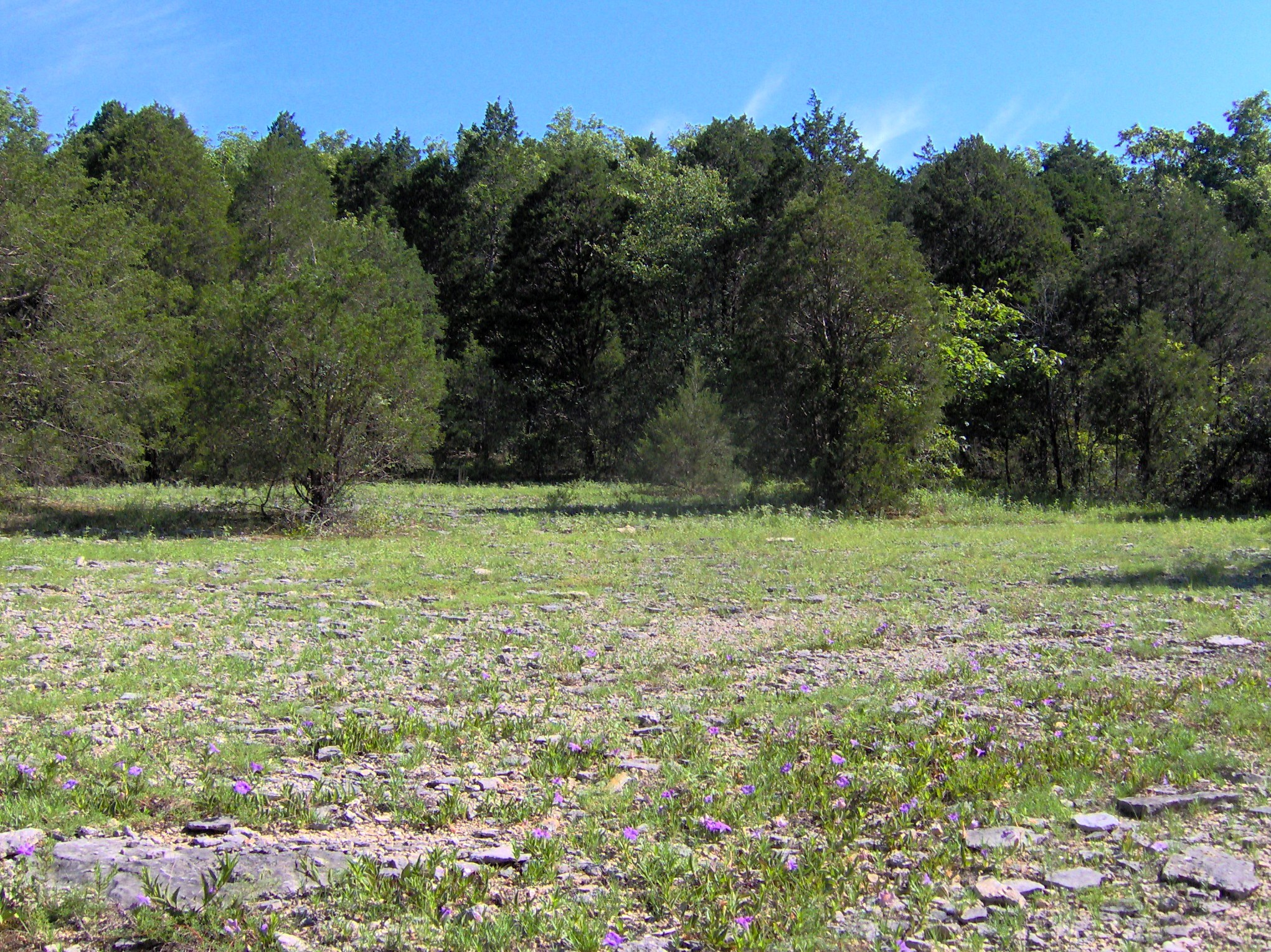
Cedar glades are an extremely rare type of ecosystem that is found in regions of Middle Tennessee where limestone bedrock is close to the surface

Tennessee is within a temperate deciduous forest biome commonly known as the Eastern Deciduous Forest. It has eight ecoregions: the Blue Ridge, Ridge and Valley, Central Appalachian, Southwestern Appalachian, Interior Low Plateaus, Southeastern Plains, Mississippi Valley Loess Plains, and Mississippi Alluvial Plain regions. Due to its wide variety of terrains and ecosystems, Tennessee is the most biodiverse inland state. The Great Smoky Mountains National Park is the most biodiverse national park, and the state's Duck River is the most biologically diverse waterway in North America. The state is home to 340 species of birds, 325 freshwater fish species, 89 mammals, 77 amphibians, and 61 reptiles.

Forests cover about 52% of the state's land area, with oak–hickory the dominant type. Appalachian oak–pine and cove hardwood forests are found in the Blue Ridge Mountains and Cumberland Plateau, and bottomland hardwood forests are common throughout the Gulf Coastal Plain. Pine forests are also found throughout the state. Some of the last remaining large American chestnut trees grow in the Nashville Basin. They are being used to help breed blight-resistant trees. Middle Tennessee is home to many unusual and rare ecosystems known as cedar glades, which occur in areas with shallow limestone bedrock that is largely barren of overlying soil and contain many endemic plant species.

Common mammals found throughout Tennessee include white-tailed deer, red and gray foxes, coyotes, raccoons, opossums, wild turkeys, rabbits, and squirrels. Black bears are found in the Blue Ridge Mountains and on the Cumberland Plateau in Eastern Tennessee. Tennessee has the third-highest number of amphibian species, and is especially known for its salamanders, with the Great Smoky Mountains National Park dubbed the "Salamander Capital of the World". The state also ranks second in the nation for the diversity of its freshwater fish species.

== Climate ==
A map of Köppen climate types in Tennessee

Most of the state has a humid subtropical climate, with the exception of some of the higher elevations in the Appalachians, which are classified as having a mountain temperate or humid continental climate due to cooler temperatures. The Gulf of Mexico is the dominant factor in the climate of Tennessee, with winds from the south being responsible for most of the state's annual precipitation. Generally, the state has hot summers and mild to cool winters with generous precipitation throughout the year, with highest average monthly precipitation generally in the winter and spring months, between December and April. The driest months, on average, are August to October. On average the state receives 50 inches (130 cm) of precipitation annually. Snowfall ranges from 5 inches (13 cm) in West Tennessee to over 80 inches (200 cm) in the highest mountains in East Tennessee.

Summers in the state are generally hot and humid, with most of the state averaging a high of around 90 °F (32 °C) during the summer months. Winters tend to be mild to cool, increasing in coolness at higher elevations. Generally, for areas outside the highest mountains, the average overnight lows are near freezing for most of the state. The highest recorded temperature is 113 °F (45 °C) at Perryville on August 9, 1930, while the lowest recorded temperature is −32 °F (−36 °C) at Mountain City on December 30, 1917.

While the state is far enough from the coast to avoid any direct impact from a hurricane, the location of the state makes it likely to be hit by the remnants of tropical cyclones which weaken over land and can cause significant rainfall. The state averages about fifty days of thunderstorms per year, some of which can be severe with large hail and damaging winds. Tornadoes are possible throughout the state, with West and Middle Tennessee the most vulnerable. Occasionally, strong or violent tornadoes occur, such as the devastating April 2011 tornadoes that killed twenty people in North Georgia and Southeast Tennessee. On average, the state has 15 tornadoes per year. Tornadoes in Tennessee can be severe, and Tennessee leads the nation in the percentage of total tornadoes which have fatalities. Winter storms are an occasional problem, such as the infamous Blizzard of 1993, although ice storms are a more likely occurrence. Fog is a persistent problem in parts of the state, especially in East Tennessee.

=== Climate data ===
Monthly Normal High and Low Temperatures For Various Tennessee Cities (F)
City	Jan	Feb	Mar	Apr	May	Jun	Jul	Aug	Sep	Oct	Nov	Dec
Bristol	44/25	49/27	57/34	66/41	74/51	81/60	85/64	84/62	79/56	68/43	58/35	48/27
Chattanooga	50/31	54/33	63/40	72/47	79/56	86/65	90/69	89/68	82/62	72/48	61/40	52/33
Knoxville	47/30	52/33	61/40	71/48	78/57	85/65	88/69	87/68	81/62	71/50	60/41	50/34
Memphis	50/31	55/36	63/44	72/52	80/61	89/69	92/73	92/72	86/65	75/52	62/43	52/34
Nashville	47/28	52/31	61/39	70/47	78/57	85/65	89/70	89/69	82/61	71/49	59/40	49/32

Climate data for Memphis (Memphis Int'l), 1991−2020 normals, (Note: Mean monthly maxima and minima (i.e. the expected highest and lowest temperature readings at any point during the year or given month) calculated based on data at said location from 1991 to 2020.) extremes 1875−present (Note: Official records for Memphis were kept at downtown from January 1875 to December 1939 and at Memphis Int'l since January 1940.)
Month	Jan	Feb	Mar	Apr	May	Jun	Jul	Aug	Sep	Oct	Nov	Dec	Year
Record high °F (°C)	79 (26)	81 (27)	87 (31)	94 (34)	99 (37)	104 (40)	108 (42)	107 (42)	103 (39)	98 (37)	86 (30)	81 (27)	108 (42)
Mean maximum °F (°C)	70.5 (21.4)	73.5 (23.1)	80.2 (26.8)	85.3 (29.6)	90.7 (32.6)	95.9 (35.5)	98.1 (36.7)	98.5 (36.9)	95.3 (35.2)	88.5 (31.4)	79.1 (26.2)	71.4 (21.9)	99.9 (37.7)
Mean daily maximum °F (°C)	50.9 (10.5)	55.5 (13.1)	64.2 (17.9)	73.4 (23.0)	81.7 (27.6)	89.4 (31.9)	91.9 (33.3)	91.5 (33.1)	86.0 (30.0)	75.1 (23.9)	62.6 (17.0)	53.4 (11.9)	73.0 (22.8)
Daily mean °F (°C)	42.1 (5.6)	46.1 (7.8)	54.2 (12.3)	63.2 (17.3)	72.1 (22.3)	79.9 (26.6)	82.8 (28.2)	82.1 (27.8)	76.0 (24.4)	64.6 (18.1)	52.7 (11.5)	44.8 (7.1)	63.4 (17.4)
Mean daily minimum °F (°C)	33.3 (0.7)	36.7 (2.6)	44.3 (6.8)	53.0 (11.7)	62.4 (16.9)	70.4 (21.3)	73.6 (23.1)	72.6 (22.6)	65.9 (18.8)	54.0 (12.2)	42.9 (6.1)	36.2 (2.3)	53.8 (12.1)
Mean minimum °F (°C)	16.0 (−8.9)	20.8 (−6.2)	26.3 (−3.2)	37.3 (2.9)	48.4 (9.1)	60.4 (15.8)	67.0 (19.4)	64.8 (18.2)	52.4 (11.3)	38.0 (3.3)	27.3 (−2.6)	21.1 (−6.1)	13.6 (−10.2)
Record low °F (°C)	−8 (−22)	−11 (−24)	12 (−11)	27 (−3)	36 (2)	48 (9)	52 (11)	48 (9)	36 (2)	25 (−4)	9 (−13)	−13 (−25)	−13 (−25)
Average precipitation inches (mm)	4.14 (105)	4.55 (116)	5.74 (146)	5.87 (149)	5.27 (134)	3.99 (101)	4.82 (122)	3.37 (86)	3.03 (77)	3.98 (101)	4.69 (119)	5.49 (139)	54.94 (1,395)
Average snowfall inches (cm)	0.9 (2.3)	1.0 (2.5)	0.5 (1.3)	0.0 (0.0)	0.0 (0.0)	0.0 (0.0)	0.0 (0.0)	0.0 (0.0)	0.0 (0.0)	0.0 (0.0)	0.1 (0.25)	0.2 (0.51)	2.7 (6.9)
Average precipitation days (≥ 0.01 in)	10.0	9.9	11.5	9.6	10.6	8.9	9.5	7.6	7.1	7.5	9.0	10.2	111.4
Average snowy days (≥ 0.1 in)	1.0	0.8	0.3	0.0	0.0	0.0	0.0	0.0	0.0	0.0	0.2	0.3	2.6
Average relative humidity (%)	68.2	66.4	63.2	62.5	66.4	66.8	69.1	69.6	71.3	66.2	67.7	68.8	67.2
Average dew point °F (°C)	28.6 (−1.9)	31.8 (−0.1)	39.4 (4.1)	48.6 (9.2)	58.3 (14.6)	65.7 (18.7)	70.0 (21.1)	68.5 (20.3)	63.1 (17.3)	50.2 (10.1)	41.0 (5.0)	32.7 (0.4)	49.8 (9.9)
Mean monthly sunshine hours	166.6	173.8	215.3	254.6	301.5	320.6	326.9	307.0	251.2	245.9	173.0	151.9	2,888.3
Percentage possible sunshine	53	57	58	65	69	74	74	74	68	70	56	50	65
Average ultraviolet index	2.4	3.7	5.6	7.5	8.8	9.5	9.7	8.8	7.1	4.8	3.0	2.2	6.0
Source 1: NOAA (relative humidity and dew point 1961−1990, sun 1961−1987)
Source 2: UV Index Today (1995 to 2022)

Climate data for Nashville (Nashville Int'l), 1991–2020 normals, (Note: Mean monthly maxima and minima (i.e. the expected highest and lowest temperature readings at any point during the year or given month) calculated based on data at said location from 1991 to 2020.) extremes 1873−present (Note: Official records for Nashville were kept at downtown from December 1973 to December 1939, and at Nashville Int'l since January 1940. For more information, see Threadex)
Month	Jan	Feb	Mar	Apr	May	Jun	Jul	Aug	Sep	Oct	Nov	Dec	Year
Record high °F (°C)	78 (26)	85 (29)	89 (32)	91 (33)	96 (36)	109 (43)	107 (42)	106 (41)	105 (41)	99 (37)	88 (31)	79 (26)	109 (43)
Mean maximum °F (°C)	68.5 (20.3)	73.3 (22.9)	80.1 (26.7)	85.3 (29.6)	89.9 (32.2)	94.7 (34.8)	97.1 (36.2)	96.7 (35.9)	93.4 (34.1)	86.4 (30.2)	78.1 (25.6)	69.6 (20.9)	98.5 (36.9)
Mean daily maximum °F (°C)	49.1 (9.5)	53.8 (12.1)	62.7 (17.1)	72.6 (22.6)	80.4 (26.9)	87.7 (30.9)	90.9 (32.7)	90.4 (32.4)	84.4 (29.1)	73.5 (23.1)	61.4 (16.3)	52.2 (11.2)	71.6 (22.0)
Daily mean °F (°C)	39.6 (4.2)	43.4 (6.3)	51.5 (10.8)	60.8 (16.0)	69.3 (20.7)	77.1 (25.1)	80.7 (27.1)	79.7 (26.5)	73.1 (22.8)	61.7 (16.5)	50.3 (10.2)	42.7 (5.9)	60.8 (16.0)
Mean daily minimum °F (°C)	30.1 (−1.1)	33.0 (0.6)	40.2 (4.6)	48.9 (9.4)	58.3 (14.6)	66.4 (19.1)	70.5 (21.4)	69.0 (20.6)	61.8 (16.6)	49.9 (9.9)	39.2 (4.0)	33.3 (0.7)	50.1 (10.1)
Mean minimum °F (°C)	11.2 (−11.6)	15.4 (−9.2)	22.7 (−5.2)	32.7 (0.4)	43.1 (6.2)	55.2 (12.9)	62.4 (16.9)	60.2 (15.7)	47.3 (8.5)	33.3 (0.7)	23.5 (−4.7)	17.4 (−8.1)	9.0 (−12.8)
Record low °F (°C)	−17 (−27)	−13 (−25)	2 (−17)	23 (−5)	34 (1)	42 (6)	51 (11)	47 (8)	36 (2)	26 (−3)	−1 (−18)	−10 (−23)	−17 (−27)
Average precipitation inches (mm)	4.02 (102)	4.47 (114)	4.52 (115)	4.72 (120)	5.02 (128)	4.36 (111)	4.16 (106)	3.79 (96)	3.80 (97)	3.36 (85)	3.86 (98)	4.43 (113)	50.51 (1,283)
Average snowfall inches (cm)	2.0 (5.1)	1.5 (3.8)	0.7 (1.8)	0.0 (0.0)	0.0 (0.0)	0.0 (0.0)	0.0 (0.0)	0.0 (0.0)	0.0 (0.0)	0.0 (0.0)	0.1 (0.25)	0.4 (1.0)	4.7 (12)
Average precipitation days (≥ 0.01 in)	10.8	10.9	11.6	11.2	11.6	10.7	10.3	9.4	7.8	8.4	9.0	11.4	123.1
Average snowy days (≥ 0.1 in)	2.0	1.9	0.9	0.0	0.0	0.0	0.0	0.0	0.0	0.0	0.2	0.5	5.5
Average relative humidity (%)	70.4	68.5	64.6	63.2	69.5	70.4	72.8	73.1	73.7	69.4	70.2	71.4	69.8
Average dew point °F (°C)	26.4 (−3.1)	29.5 (−1.4)	36.9 (2.7)	45.1 (7.3)	55.9 (13.3)	63.9 (17.7)	68.0 (20.0)	66.9 (19.4)	61.2 (16.2)	48.4 (9.1)	39.4 (4.1)	31.3 (−0.4)	47.7 (8.7)
Mean monthly sunshine hours	139.6	145.2	191.3	231.5	261.8	277.7	279.0	262.1	226.4	216.8	148.1	130.6	2,510.1
Percentage possible sunshine	45	48	52	59	60	64	63	63	61	62	48	43	56
Average ultraviolet index	2	4	6	7	9	10	10	9	7	5	3	2	6
Source 1: NOAA (relative humidity, dew point, and sun 1961−1990)
Source 2: Weather Atlas (UV index) WMO
