= Tennessee River 600 =

The Tennessee River 600 is a personal watercraft (PWC) event that takes place along the Tennessee River. The trip begin in 1997 as a leisurely ride for PWC enthusiasts, but has since evolved into an annual event with participants from as many as 19 states. The first year participants rode from Paris Landing State Park to Knoxville, but in the years since, they have travelled downstream from Knoxville to Paris Landing.

The trip raises money for the Tennessee Wildlife Resources Agency, T.C. Thompson Children's Hospital in Chattanooga, Tennessee, The Children's Hospital in Huntsville, Alabama, and LeBonheur Children's Medical Center in Memphis, Tennessee. All four hospitals are members of the Children's Miracle Network.

== See also ==
- New York City Jet Ski Invasion
