= Tennessee Native Plant Society =

U.S. nonprofit organization

- Tennessee Native Plant Society Inc.
- Abbreviation: TNPS
- Formation: 1978; 48 years ago
- Founder: A. M. Evans (University of Tennessee) and Robert Farmer (Tennessee Valley Authority)
- Type: Nonprofit
- Tax ID no.: 62-1247084
- Purpose: preservation and education
- Headquarters: Nashville, Tennessee
- Board President: Mitchell Kent
- Website: https://www.tnps.org/

The Tennessee Native Plant Society (TNPS), founded 1978, is a 501(c)(3) non-profit organization headquartered in Nashville for preservation and education about the native flora of Tennessee including the Great Smoky Mountains.

TNPS supports the Tennessee-Kentucky Plant Atlas, an online database of plant distribution records, maps, and images. Print resources include Wildflowers of Tennessee, the Guide to the Vascular Plants of Tennessee, Woody Plants of Kentucky and Tennessee, and Tennessee Lichens.

The organization provides field trips, conferences, and classes to further their mission. Their Conservation Award honors individuals for their service in educating the public and preserving the flora and habitats of Tennessee.
