= WCMT-FM =

- South Fulton, Tennessee; United States
- Broadcast area: Jackson, Tennessee, area
- Branding: Mix 101.3

Programming
- Format: Adult contemporary
- Affiliations: Compass Media Networks; Premiere Networks

Ownership
- Owner: Thunderbolt Broadcasting Company
- Sister stations: KYTN, WCDZ, WCMT, WQAK

History
- First air date: 1968 (at 101.7)
- Former frequencies: 101.7 MHz (1968–2004)
- Call sign meaning: Weakley County; Martin, Tennessee

Technical information
- Licensing authority: FCC
- Facility ID: 67053
- Class: C3
- ERP: 22,000 watts
- HAAT: 94 meters (308 ft)

Links
- Public license information: Public file; LMS
- Webcast: Listen live
- Website: www.thunderboltradio.com/mix-101-3/

WCMT-FM (101.3 MHz) is a radio station broadcasting an adult contemporary format.

Licensed to South Fulton, Tennessee, United States, the station began broadcasting in 1968 and serves the Ken Tenn area (Northwest Tennessee and Southwest Kentucky) and can be heard in both Jackson and Paducah, Kentucky markets.

The station is owned by Thunderbolt Broadcasting Company.

== Programming ==
WCMT-FM "Mix 101.3 WCMT" is a contemporary adult hit radio station playing top hits from the 80s, 90s, 2000s and today. WCMT FM airs high school sports broadcasts. Network programming aired on WCMT-FM includes Rick Dees Weekly Top 20, and John Tesh – Intelligence For Your Life. Wink Martindale's "100 Greatest Christmas Hits of All Time" ten-hour program is heard on December 24 and 25 and has become a holiday staple for Ken-Tenn area listeners. Sunday morning from 6 til 11am Mix 101.3 airs religious music. Local news can be heard seven days per week on Mix 101.3 WCMT-FM; the community affairs program "30 Minutes" air Sunday mornings at 6:30 Central time. Weekdays from 6am til 9am Mix 101.3 WCMT FM rebroadcasts the popular "Good Times in the Morning" show which features phone calls, contest and "live" – in studio interviews.

== History ==
WCMT-FM originally began broadcasting in 1968 on 101.7, when manager Dwight "Duke" Drumm persuaded owner Jones T. Sudbury to seek an FM frequency so local sports, including UT Martin athletic games, could be broadcast at night. Prior to this, the ballgames were being taped and aired the next day. The station offered "beautiful music" until about 1978, when a "rock format" debuted. The station then moved to an oldies format and then to the present adult contemporary station.

Effective July 28, 2004 WCMT-FM was given permission to increase its power to 22,000 watts by moving its city of license from Martin to South Fulton, Tennessee and changing its frequency to 101.3 which allowed the stations to serve thousands more listeners.

Former logo

During the transition from 101.7 to 101.3, WCMT-FM constructed a new 349-foot tower off the Ken Tenn highway near South Fulton which allowed WCMT-FM to send a powerful signal that stretched to Paducah, Kentucky and Jackson, Tennessee. WCMT-FM is the most powerful station in the immediate local market.

Thunderbolt Broadcasting also owns and operates WCMT AM 1410 (with an additional five FM translator channels that rebroadcast all WCMT AM programming), along with WCDZ FM 95.1, KYTN FM 104.9 and WQAK FM 105.7. The company is a member of the International Broadcaster's Idea Bank, the National Association of Broadcasters, the Kentucky Broadcasters Association and the Tennessee Association of Broadcasters, the Arkansas Broadcasters Association, is a recipient of the Weakley County Chamber of Commerce "Business of the Year."
