= Tennessee Student Assistance Corporation =

The Tennessee Student Assistance Corporation (TSAC) was created by the Tennessee General Assembly in 1974 as a non-profit corporation with the merging of the Tennessee Educational Loan Corporation and the Tennessee Tuition Grant Program.

The Tennessee Student Assistance Corporation is Tennessee's designated federal guaranty agency responsible for the administration of post secondary educational loan programs authorized by the Title IV of the Higher Education Act of 1965, and further authorized by Tennessee Code Annotated Section 49-4-404. TSAC also administers other state and federal student assistance programs, including the popular HOPE Scholarship program. The HOPE Scholarship is a lottery-funded merit-based award. Tennessee high school graduates qualify for this $4,000/year award by graduating from high school with a 3.0 GPA or an ACT test score of 21. The award is renewable to those who maintain a college GPA of 2.75 after 24 credits, and a 3.0 GPA thereafter.

TSAC is administered by a seventeen-member Board of Directors. Its daily operation is managed by an Executive Director and five Associate Executive Directors. Total staff number about 55.

Current senior staff include Executive Director Robert W. Ruble, Associate Executive Director for Grants and Scholarships Tim Phelps, Associate Executive Director for Loan Programs Levis Hughes, Associate Executive Director for Business Affairs Mason Ball, Associate Executive Director for Compliance and Legal Affairs Tom Bain, and Associate Executive Director for Communication Services Jeri Fields
