= List of Tennessee state prisons =

This is a list of state prisons in Tennessee. The only federal prison in Tennessee is Federal Correctional Institution, Memphis in Shelby County, although there is a Residential Reentry Management operated by the Bureau of Prisons in Nashville. This list also does not include county jails located in the state of Tennessee.

The Tennessee government agency responsible for state prisons is the Tennessee Department of Correction.

== Male facilities ==
Facility	County	Location	Year opened	
Bledsoe County Correctional Complex	Bledsoe	Pikeville	2012	
Lois M. DeBerry Special Needs Facility	Davidson	Nashville	1992	
Morgan County Correctional Complex	Morgan	Wartburg	1980	
Northeast Correctional Complex	Johnson	Mountain City	1991	
Carter County Annex	Carter	Roan Mountain	1986	
Carter County Annex	Carter	Roan Mountain	closed 2021	
Northwest Correctional Complex	Lake	Tiptonville	1981	site 2
Northwest Correctional Complex	Lake	Tiptonville	1992	site 1
Riverbend Maximum Security Institution	Davidson	Nashville	1989	
Turney Center Industrial Complex	Hickman	Only	1971	
Turney Center Annex	Wayne	Clifton	1985	
West Tennessee State Penitentiary	Lauderdale	Henning	1990	

== Female facilities ==
Facility	County	Location	Year opened	
Mark H. Luttrell Correctional Center	Shelby	Memphis	Opened in 1999 as a female institution	Converted to male institution in 2016
Debra K. Johnson Rehabilitation Center	Davidson	Nashville	1966	Formerly known as the Tennessee Prison for Women; Renamed Debra K. Johnson Rehabilitation Center in 2020.
Bledsoe County Correctional Complex	Bledsoe	Pikeville		Houses 300 female inmates in a separate unit originally built as a men’s annex.

== Private facilities ==
Facility	Operated by	County	Location	Year opened
South Central Correctional Facility	Corrections Corporation of America	Wayne	Clifton	1992
Hardeman County Correctional Center	Corrections Corporation of America	Hardeman	Whiteville	1997
Whiteville Correctional Facility	Corrections Corporation of America	Hardeman	Whiteville	2002
Trousdale Turner Correctional Center	Corrections Corporation of America	Trousdale	Hartsville	2016

== Closed ==
Facility	County	Location	Year opened	Year closed
Tennessee State Penitentiary	Davidson	Nashville	1831 (Note: Opened near 7th Avenue and Broadway in 1831, moved to Church St. in 1858, final facility opened on Cockrill Bend Blvd. in 1898)	1992 (Note: TSP was closed by court order and replaced by Riverbend Maximum Security Institution in 1992.)
Cold Creek Correctional Facility	Lauderdale	Henning	1938 (Note: An expansion of then West Tennessee High Security Facility allowed the main facilities to close and the minimum security annex to combine with WTHSF to form West Tennessee State Penitentiary.)	1999
Brushy Mountain Correctional Complex	Morgan	Petros	1896 (Note: Operational 1896-1972, 1976-2009)	2009 (Note: An expansion of Morgan County Correctional Complex allowed the 113-year-old facility to close.)
Charles Bass Correctional Complex	Davidson	Nashville	1946 (annex)	2015
Charles Bass Correctional Complex	Davidson	Nashville	1979 (main facility)	2015
