= Tennessee Governor's Cabinet =

Cabinet of the State of Tennessee
- Seal of the State of Tennessee

Advisory overview
- Headquarters: Nashville, Tennessee
- Employees: 30 members: 22 commissioners; 1 director; 7 other officials
- Advisory executive: Bill Lee, Governor of Tennessee, chairman
- Website: www.tn.gov

The Cabinet of the State of Tennessee is an advisory body that oversees the executive branch of Tennessee state government. Members, titled "commissioners" are appointed by the governor--not subject to the approval of the General Assembly--and oversee various government departments and agencies. Each works with the governor to implement his policy goals within their area of expertise. Departments, and therefore commissioners, are often rearranged by newly elected governors. Additionally, several members of the governor's staff often participate in Cabinet meetings and discussions.

== Current Cabinet ==
Under incumbent Governor Bill Lee, there are 30 members of the Governor's Cabinet: 22 commissioners, the Director of TennCare, and 7 members of the Governor's staff.

Current Cabinet
Name	Title	Department
Joseph Williams	Chief of Staff	Office of the Governor
Brandon Gibson	Chief Operating Officer	Office of the Governor
Michael Hendrix	Policy Director	Office of the Governor
Casey Sellers	Communications Director	Office of the Governor
John DeBerry	Senior Advisor	Office of the Governor
Erin Merrick	Chief Counsel	Office of the Governor
Alec Richardson	Senior Advisor and Director of External Affairs	Office of the Governor
Charlie Hatcher	Commissioner	Department of Agriculture
Margie Quin	Commissioner	Department of Children's Services
Carter Lawrence	Commissioner	Department of Commerce and Insurance
Frank Strada	Commissioner	Department of Correction
Brad Turner	Commissioner	Department of Disability and Aging
Stuart McWhorter	Commissioner	Department of Economic and Community Development
Lizzette Reynolds	Commissioner	Department of Education
David W. Salyers	Commissioner	Department of Environment and Conservation
Jim Bryson	Commissioner	Department of Finance and Administration
Greg Gonzales	Commissioner	Department of Financial Institutions
Andy Kidd	Commissioner	Department of General Services
Dr. Ralph Alvarado	Commissioner	Department of Health
Juan Williams	Commissioner	Department of Human Resources
Clarence Carter	Commissioner	Department of Human Services
Deniece Thomas	Commissioner	Department of Labor and Workforce Development
Marie Williams	Commissioner	Department of Mental Health and Substance Abuse Services
Maj. Gen. Warner Ross II	Adjutant General / Commissioner	Department of the Military
David Gerregano	Commissioner	Department of Revenue
Jeff Long	Commissioner	Department of Safety and Homeland Security
Stephen Smith	Director	Division of TennCare
Mark Ezell	Commissioner	Department of Tourist Development
Butch Eley	Deputy Governor and Commissioner	Department of Transportation
Maj. Gen. Tommy Baker	Commissioner	Department of Veterans Services
