= COVID-19 pandemic in Tennessee =

- Disease: COVID-19
- Pathogen: SARS-CoV-2
- Location: Tennessee, U.S.
- Index case: Williamson County
- Arrival date: March 5, 2020
- Confirmed cases: 2,023,815
- Active cases: 34,272
- Hospitalized cases: 445(as of June 9, 2022) unknown (cumulative)
- Recovered: unknown
- Deaths: 26,103

Government website
- www.tn.gov/health/cedep/ncov.html

The COVID-19 pandemic was confirmed to have reached the U.S. state of Tennessee on March 5, 2020. As of June 5, 2022, there were 2,023,815 confirmed cases, 26,103 deaths, and 12,825,885 reported tests.

As of June 9, 2022, Tennessee ranked 21st by number of confirmed cases, 35th by number of deaths, and 44th by number of deaths per capita in the United States.

As of June 9, 2022, Tennessee has administered 10,145,126 COVID-19 vaccine doses and 55.81% are fully vaccinated.

== Timeline ==
Animated map of the spread of coronavirus from March 11, 2020, until May 1, 2020

=== March 2020 ===
On March 5, the first case of COVID-19 is reported in Tennessee, in Williamson County. The patient was a 44-year-old adult man and resident of Williamson County who recently flew on a nonstop flight to Boston through Nashville's airport.

On March 12, Governor Bill Lee issues an executive order declaring a state of emergency until May 11.

On March 16, Nashville mayor John Cooper forces bars to close in Nashville and Davidson County and imposes limitations on restaurants. Governor Lee asks schools to close by March 20.

On March 19, Fiona Whelan Prine, wife and manager of country folk singer-songwriter John Prine announces that she has the coronavirus. On March 26, John is admitted to the hospital after developing sudden onset of COVID-19 symptoms. On April 7, John dies, while Fiona Whelan Prine announces she has recovered.

On March 20, the first death is reported in Nashville.

On March 22, the University of Tennessee reports its first confirmed case of COVID-19. The case involves a staff member and is confirmed by the Knox County Health Department.

On March 23, Memphis mayor Jim Strickland and Shelby County mayor Lee Harris issue "stay at home" executive orders that take effect for Memphis and Shelby County the following day.

On March 26, Middle Tennessee State University confirms an on-campus student tested positive for COVID-19 and is being supported by MTSU Student Health Services.

On March 29, country music artist Joe Diffie dies in Nashville due to complications from the coronavirus, according to his publicist.

=== April 2020 ===
On April 2, Governor Lee issued a "stay at home" executive order for the entire state, effective through April 14. On April 13, he extended the order through April 30. Two days later, Governor Lee recommended that all Tennessee schools close for the rest of the 2019–2020 school year.

On April 20, 150 inmates tested positive for COVID-19 at the Bledsoe County Correctional Complex in Pikeville, a number that quickly rose as more tested positive over the next days.

On April 27, there were 576 positive cases at the Bledsoe County Correctional Complex.

Lee confirmed the "stay at home" executive order would expire on April 30, and the majority of businesses would be able to reopen the following day, May 1.

=== May 2020 ===
On May 1, around 1,000 inmates and staff tested positive for COVID-19 at the Trousdale Turner Correctional Center in Hartsville, leading to a significant jump in the state numbers for that day.

On May 7, a study conducted by Harvard's Global Health Institute in conjunction with NPR listed Tennessee as one of nine U.S. states that was doing enough testing to successfully control its coronavirus outbreak.

On May 10, Hancock County became the last county in the state without any confirmed cases of COVID-19 after Pickett County reported one case.

On May 15, the state of Tennessee announced Phase 2 of reopening, set to start May 22. This applied to 89 of Tennessee's 95 counties (all but Davidson, Hamilton, Knox, Madison, Shelby, and Sullivan). Knox County mayor Glenn Jacobs announced that Knoxville would follow the state's guidelines. Dollywood announced it planned to reopen "soon".

On May 19, every county in Tennessee was confirmed to have had COVID-19 after Hancock County reported a case.

On May 26, it was reported that all employees of a single farm in Rhea County (nearly 200 people) had tested positive.

=== June 2020 ===
On June 19, the Tennessee House of Representatives passed House Resolution 340, introduced by James Van Huss, resolving that the "mainstream media has sensationalized the reporting on COVID-19 in the service of political agendas."

On June 22, the Westmore Church of God in Cleveland held a three-hour regional worship service for several hundred people. At least a dozen people attending the event tested positive.

On June 29, "at least 164 children living in facilities operated or licensed by the Tennessee Department of Children's Services have tested positive."

=== July 2020 ===
On July 3, Governor Bill Lee signed an executive order giving authority to Tennessee's 89 non-metro counties with no locally operated health departments to enforce mask-wearing mandates in their counties.

On July 10, State Representative Kent Calfee, a Republican from Kingston became the first member of the Tennessee General Assembly to test positive for COVID-19.

On July 12, the pastor of the Westmore Church of God said that "the church should have taken masks more seriously as a precaution." The church had stopped tracking the number of confirmed cases in its congregation.

On July 17, three elderly church members who attended a June 21 service at the Westmore Church of God had died of Covid.

On July 23, there were 7,572 school-age children in Tennessee with a COVID-19 diagnosis. This number was thought to be an undercount of cases, as children are not routinely tested. Six counties in Middle Tennessee counties were in the top 10 for juvenile cases.

On July 29, Dr. Fauci warned that there were early signs of an impending outbreak in Tennessee, and that 93% of Tennessee's counties had a transmission rate "above the threshold."

=== August 2020 ===
On August 5, the Tennessee Supreme Court ruled that "fear of COVID-19" was not a valid excuse for Tennesseans to vote-by-mail in the coming November elections, countering the injunction of Nashville judge Ellen Lyle mandating a COVID-19 excuse as a reason to apply for a absentee ballot.

On August 10, a church in Athens closed after several church members tested positive.

On August 12, two nursing homes in Johnson City and Greeneville reported at least 78 cases.

On August 13, the University of Tennessee had 20 cases among students, 8 cases among staff, and 155 people self-isolating due to potential exposure.

On August 15, five Middle Tennessee counties had closed individual classrooms or entire schools due to individuals with symptoms or exposures.

On August 18, the University of Tennessee reported 75 active cases, and had traced one cluster to an off-campus party.

On August 31, there were 965 positive cases at the South Central Correctional Facility in Wayne County.

=== September 2020 ===
On September 3, 1,144 people incarcerated at South Central Correctional Facility in Clifton had tested positive for the virus. The total number of deaths among people incarcerated in state prisons was 14. Another round of mass testing began for all state prisons. 312 Tennessee Department of Correction employees had tested positive for the virus, and one had died.

On September 9, University of Tennessee had 660 cases, and 990 students self-isolating or in quarantine. Students in Massey Hall were required to move out, so that their rooms could be reallocated to students requiring isolation.

On September 17, WZTV (Fox News Nashville) reported that the mayor of Nashville, John Cooper was shutting down and severely limiting the capacity of bars and restaurants during the July 4th weekend due to a mere 80 coronavirus cases linked to bars. As a comparison, more than 1,000 coronavirus cases in Nashville were linked to both construction and nursing homes. The mayor's office was falsely reported to have actively deceived the public on the number of coronavirus cases linked to bars and restaurants. Bar owners considered this particularly egregious as the "night life economy makes Nashville go" and these restrictions have caused Music City musicians, sound engineers, and bartenders to be "thrown out".

=== October 2020 ===
On October 22, Williamson, Wilson, and Sumner Counties reinstated mandates requiring residents to wear masks in public.

=== November 2020 ===
On November 17, the day after Moderna announced its coronavirus vaccine reduced the risk of coronavirus infection by 94.5 percent, the New England Journal of Medicine reported that Vanderbilt University Medical Center, among others, worked on this vaccine. Additionally, the New England Journal of Medicine reported that prominent country artist and Tennessee resident Dolly Parton helped fund research at VUMC for this vaccine. Parton said she donated $1 million because her friend, Naji Abumrad of VUMC, informed her that the hospital was making exciting advancements towards a coronavirus cure.

=== December 2020 ===
In a December 20 televised speech, Governor Bill Lee emphasized his support for mask usage but rejected calls to impose a statewide mask mandate. He made the speech following reports that Tennessee was experiencing one of the country's worst new coronavirus case rates per person. He explained his viewpoint, saying, "Many think a statewide mask mandate would improve mask wearing, many think it would have the opposite effect...This has been a heavily politicized issue. Please do not get caught up in that and don't misunderstand my belief in local government on this issue. Masks work and I want every Tennessean to wear one." Governor Lee added new limits to indoor public gatherings via his new executive order announced during the same speech. Lee limited all indoor public gatherings to 10 people; religious services, weddings, and funerals excepted from this requirement. Additionally, Lee asked Tennesseans to avoid gathering for Christmas outside of homes and encouraged Tennessee businesses to allow employees to work remotely or require masks for employees.

On December 23, Governor Lee extended Tennessee counties' authority to mandate masks through February 27.

=== January 2021 ===
On January 2, health officials in Hamilton County sent 75-year-old citizens home after waiting in line for four hours to receive the vaccine against COVID-19, and then they administered vaccines to politically connected family and friends.

On January 29, the state of Tennessee announced it had partnered with Walmart to ensure that it is feasible for all people in Tennessee to get the coronavirus vaccine. Walmart will open at least 20 vaccination centers in its West Tennessee stores.

=== February 2021 ===
Total cases by county as of February 1, 2021: 250–4,999 cases >5,000 cases

On February 12, Walmart announced that its pharmacies would provide vaccination sites, emphasizing locations with many customers who have limited access to health care. This included locations in Bristol, Johnson City, Kingsport, Knoxville, and Sevierville.

On February 23, the state of Tennessee announced at least 2,400 coronavirus vaccine doses were wasted by Shelby County officials due to an excessive vaccine inventory, poor record-keeping, no county-instituted process for managing soon-to-expire vaccines, and unusually poor winter weather (ice, snow, sleet, frigid temperatures, etc.) during the week of February 15. However, the winter weather was not entirely to blame, as the state claimed the issues went as far back as February 3. As a result, the state of Tennessee will not allow the Shelby County government to distribute vaccine supplies; instead, the Memphis city government, Memphis hospitals, and other clinics and pharmacies would take charge of vaccine distribution and administration.

On February 26, Governor Bill Lee extended Tennessee counties' authority to mandate masks through April 28. Several counties chose to lift mask mandates everywhere except governmental buildings, but continued to recommend masks.

Also on February 26, the state of Tennessee announced that all of Tennessee's nursing homes and "skilled nursing facilities" had received both doses of coronavirus vaccines as of February 24. The state also announced that vaccinations for these people are expected to be completed across the state during the week of February 26. In light of these announcements, the state stopped requiring nursing homes and "skilled nursing facilities" to follow stringent guidelines; however individual businesses may choose to continue to limit visitors and nursing homes that receive federal funds are still subject to federal rules.

=== March 2021 ===
On March 12, the University of Tennessee, the state's flagship public university, announced it would fully reopen in the fall semester, including doing all on-campus activities at full capacity.

=== April 2021 ===
On April 5, COVID-19 vaccine eligibility was extended to all adults statewide.

On April 27, Governor Lee declared the public health emergency over due to vaccine availability, and ended his emergency executive orders allowing 89 of Tennessee's 95 counties to impose mask mandates. Nashville, as part of Davidson County, announced it would remove most public health orders on May 14. However, the mask mandate would remain, as it is part of the six counties with the power to mandate masks.

=== May 2021 ===
In May, after the FDA approved the Pfizer vaccine for use among adolescents, Tennessee Department of Health (TDH) medical director of vaccines and immunization Michelle Fiscus issued an informational memo with language from the TDH general counsel explaining the mature minor doctrine present under state case law, which ruled that minors over the age of 14 are mature enough to consent to medical procedures such as vaccination on their own. The memo was met with criticism from other state officials, who saw the memo as an attempt to "undermine parental authority" by implicating plans to vaccinate children without parental consent.

=== June 2021 ===
In mid-June 2021 during a hearing of the state's Government Operations Committee, the TDH was accused by Republican lawmakers of "peer pressuring" teenagers and young adults to get the vaccine via outreach targeting the demographic, and lawmakers threatened to "dissolv[e] and reconstitut[e]" the TDH. State representative Scott Cepicky argued that "personally, I think it's reprehensible that you would do that, that you would do that to our youth.", and state senator Kerry Roberts stated that "It looks like the Department of Health is marketing to children and it looks like you're advocating. Market to parents, don't market to children. Period." Governor Lee later explained that the state planned to "continue to encourage folks to seek access, adults for their children and adults for themselves to make the choice, the personal choice for a vaccine."

=== July 2021 ===
By July 2021, Tennessee had been affected by increasing cases of delta variant.

On July 12, 2021, the state fired Fiscus from the TDH; she cited disputes over the aforementioned memo as the likely reasoning, and stated that Tennessee had also ceased all vaccine outreach specifically directed towards minors (including outreach unrelated to COVID-19). Fiscus told CNN that "It is just astounding to me how absolutely political and self-centered our elected people are here and how very little they care for the people of Tennessee". and that "public health should never, ever, ever be political." The state argued that Fiscus was fired due to her "failure to maintain good working relationships with members of her team, her lack of effective leadership, her lack of appropriate management, and unwillingness to consult with superiors and other internal stakeholders on [Vaccine Preventable Diseases and Immunization Program] projects."

On July 23, TDH commissioner Lisa Piercey stated that the state would (as per Lee's earlier statements) promote vaccination for minors via communications aimed towards parents and guardians.

On July 27, Lieutenant Governor Randy McNally and several other Republican state senators, including State Senate Majority Leader Jack Johnson composed and signed a public letter recommending those Tennesseans "who do not have a religious objection or a legitimate medical issue" get vaccinated. The senators who signed also stated that "[u]nder no circumstances will the state of Tennessee require mandatory vaccines or vaccine passports for adults or children" and that vaccination is ultimately a personal choice.

Also on July 27, amid changes in CDC guidance recommending masks be worn by all students and faculty of schools regardless of whether they are fully vaccinated, Education Commissioner Penny Schwinn stated that as before, the decision to mandate masks will be left to local county and city school districts; Shelby County Schools plans to require masks, while nearby city and county school districts are choosing to make masks optional.

In an interview with WTVF aired July 28, Fiscus accused Governor Lee of refusing to authorize use of the single-dose Janssen vaccine in state health departments due to his religious views, citing claims that the vaccine was made using fetal tissue. The TDH states on its website that "Fetal tissue was not used to make [the Janssen vaccine], nor any other, COVID-19 vaccine. In developing its vaccine, [Janssen] used a fetal cell line, which no longer contains the original donor cells". The Governor's communications director issued a statement that Tennessee "has never limited or delayed the public's access to any of the approved COVID-19 vaccines, either in public health departments or the pharmacy partnerships that have been a part of vaccine distribution."

== Government response ==
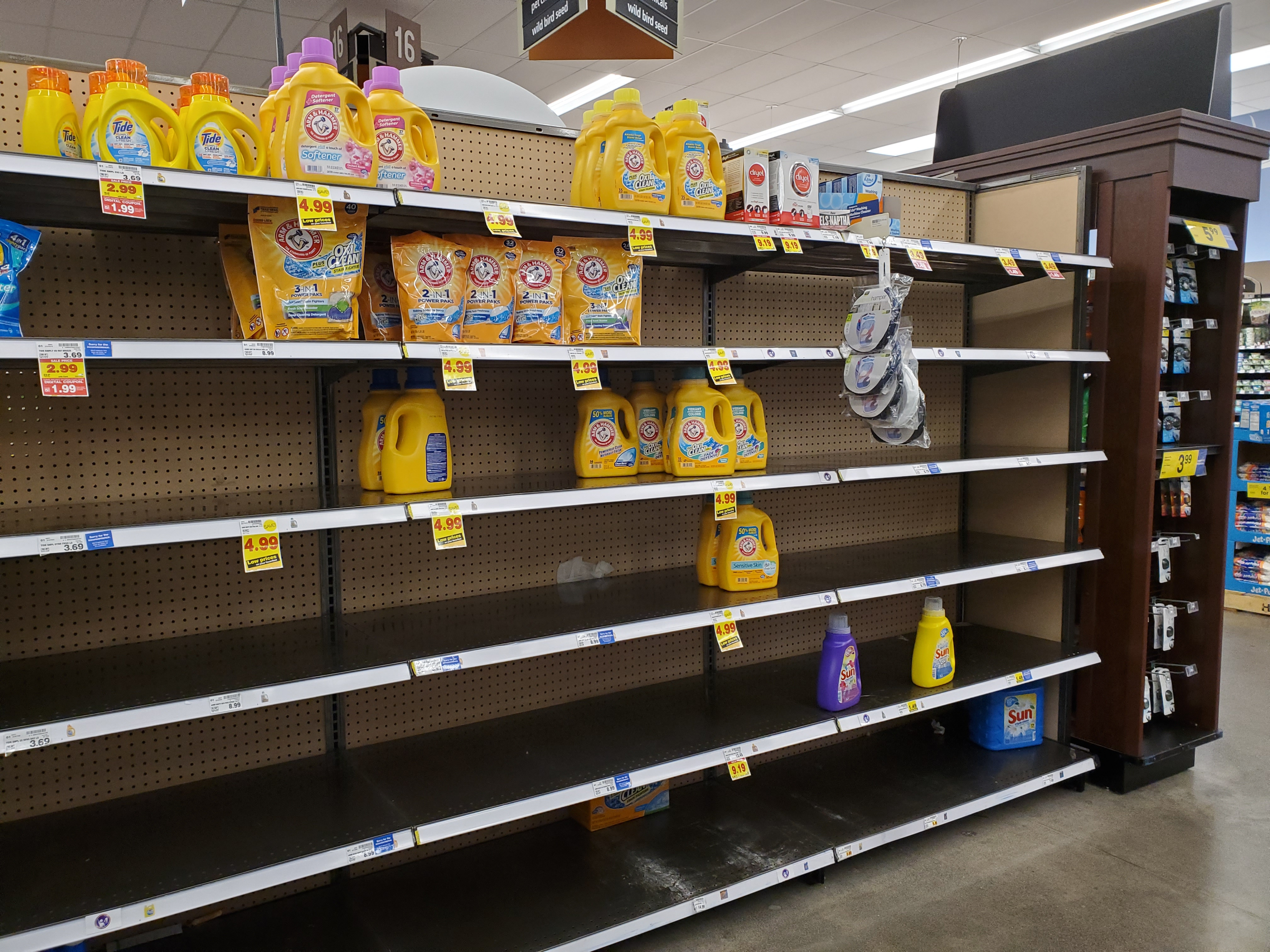
A barely-stocked shelf in the laundry detergent aisle at Kroger in Springfield.

On March 5, Governor Bill Lee reported the state's first case: a man in his 40s in Williamson County who had recently traveled outside the state.

On March 12, Governor Lee issued Executive Order No. 14 to declare a State of Emergency until it expired on May 11. The order allows pharmacists to dispense an additional 30-day prescription provided it is to prevent the spread of the virus, allows for alternate COVID-19 testing sites provided that the Tennessee Medical Laboratory Board is notified, restricts an excessive price increase of items and services until March 27, suspends maximum size limitations for vehicles participating in preventing the spread of the virus, and gives the Tennessee Commissioner of Human Services the ability to waive child care requirements as needed.

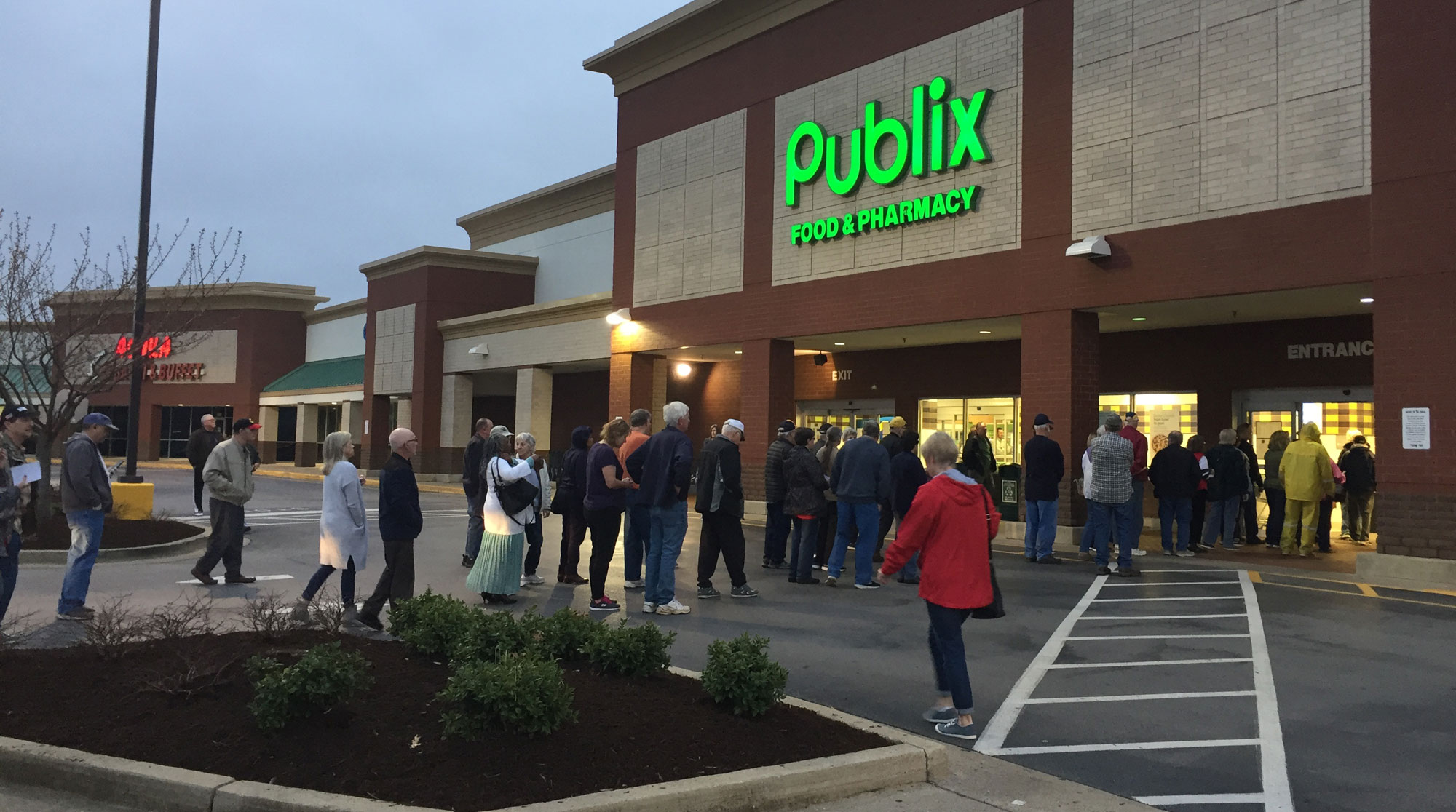
A long line of customers at Publix in Smyrna.

On March 13, the Tennessee Supreme Court under Chief Justice Jeff Bivins issued a State of Emergency order applying to the Tennessee judicial branch. The order suspended in-person proceedings until March 31, and extended statutes of limitations and orders of protection that would expire on April 5 or before to April 6. Additionally, Governor Lee banned traveling by state employees for non-essential government business, while also banning visitors and tours in Nashville. The Tennessee General Assembly also banned the public from the legislative Cordell Hull Office complex with only members, staff, and media allowed.

On March 16, Nashville mayor John Cooper announced that bars would close across the county and imposed limitations on restaurants. On the same day, Lee asked schools to close by March 20; on April 15, he recommended they stay closed through the end of the school year.

On March 23, Memphis mayor Jim Strickland and Shelby County mayor Lee Harris issued executive orders to take effect 6:00 pm, March 24, requiring residents to remain at home unless they served essential services. The list of essential services was broad.

The state has gradually collected more information in its coronavirus reporting. Initially, Tennessee was unable to reveal the counties where infected people lived. On March 10, the state government began reporting coronavirus cases by county, but it still did not have information regarding age and gender. Currently, age, gender, race, and county information is published daily. On March 31, the state government was able to reveal the number of negative cases in each county. Lee also signed an executive order allowing local governments to meet remotely after the legislature failed to do so.

On March 25, during Governor Lee's daily COVID-19 briefing, Military Commissioner Major General Jeff Holmes announced that 250 members of the Tennessee National Guard had been mobilized to assist in the state's response and were receiving training in Smyrna. Small teams of Guardsmen were dispersed across 35 counties to support coronavirus testing. Members of the Tennessee State Guard were activated to assist the National Guard's mission.

On April 2, Governor Lee announced that he would sign Executive Order No. 23, which would call for all residents to stay home through April 14, unless they were carrying out essential activities. On April 13, Lee extended the order to the end of the month, to align with President Trump's plans for businesses to reopen in early May.

The Tennessee Major Metros Economic Restart Task Force was established on April 16, composed of mayors representing Knoxville, Memphis, Nashville, and Chattanooga, as well as business and health leaders. The task force would plan resumption of business suspended due to COVID-19.

Governor Lee announced on April 20 that the 'Safer at Home' order would expire on April 30, and the majority of businesses would be able to reopen the following day, May 1.

On April 24, Governor Lee announced his reopening plan, applying to 89 of Tennessee's 95 counties. It did not apply to Nashville, Memphis, Knoxville, and Chattanooga — Tennessee's largest cities. Instead, Lee left reopening decisions to local leaders in those places. The guidelines allowed restaurants and retail stores to reopen on April 27 and 29, respectively. The state recommended that businesses should keep occupancy at 50% capacity and require employees to use cloth masks and gloves.

On April 30, Shelby County Mayor Lee Harris and Memphis Mayor Jim Strickland announced that the city of Memphis and its surrounding county were ready to "slowly start opening our economy back up and get Memphians working again" on May 4. After a meeting of a "diverse group with ideological and political differences", it was determined that Memphis would not be able to reopen with most of the rest of the state. Memphis entered Phase 1 of reopening on May 4.

On May 7, Nashville mayor John Cooper announced that Nashville has a "passing grade" and would begin Phase 1 of reopening on May 11. This would bring Nashville into closer alignment with the rest of the state, where some businesses reopened with partial capacity on May 1.

On May 15, the Governor's Economic Recovery Group announced Phase 2 of reopening. In this phase, starting May 22, 89 of Tennessee's 95 counties (excluding the largest cities that determine their own timelines) would allow restaurants and retail to operate at full capacity with social distancing and not allowing groups of more than 10 people. Also "large non-contact attractions" such as theaters, amusement parks, water parks, racetracks, museums, and auditoriums would be allowed to reopen with social distancing. Knox County mayor Glenn Jacobs announced that Knoxville would follow the state's guidelines. Dollywood announced it planned to reopen "soon".

On July 22, the Oak Ridge City Council, passed a measure to send Governor Lee a resolution to give municipalities the ability to enforce maskti mandates, regardless if the county that the municipality is in did not enforce a mandate itself.

On July 29, with schools reopening across the state, the state health department decided not to collect data on COVID-19 cases in schools, instead leaving the decision of whether to collect and share the data to the individual school districts.

In 2023, the Tennessee General Assembly enacted House Bill 2, which made permanent several provisions regarding COVID-19. This includes prohibiting public entities from requiring proof of COVID-19 vaccination and limiting the authority of local health officials to mask mandates.

Effective January 1, 2025, the Tennessee Department of Health (TDH) transitioned to a "pan-respiratory" surveillance model. Under this new policy, healthcare providers and laboratories are no longer required to report individual COVID-19 cases, except in instances of pediatric deaths (under 18) or suspected outbreaks.

=== Mask mandate enforcement ===
Counties with mask mandates as of November 23 (in red)

By July 16, after the Governor's July 3 executive order giving all Tennessee counties the power to mandate masks in public, Davidson, Dickson, Greene, Hamblen, Hamilton, Hancock, Hawkins, Knox, Madison, Montgomery, Robertson, Sevier, Shelby, Sullivan, Sumner, Washington, and Williamson counties required masks.

Meanwhile, Anderson, Bedford, Bledsoe, Blount, Bradley, Cheatham, Coffee, Franklin, Grainger, Grundy, Hickman, Marion, Marshall, Maury, McMinn, Meigs, Polk, Putnam, Rhea, Rutherford, Sesquatchie, and Wilson Counties announced they would not require masks. Several counties continue to recommend, but not require, masks and framed the mask issue as an issue of personal responsibility and "love and respect". Six of Tennessee's counties (Davidson, Hamilton, Knox, Madison, Shelby, Sullivan) have local health departments and already had the authority to issue mask mandates.

On October 30, Governor Bill Lee extended Tennessee counties' authority to issue mask mandates through December 29. Montgomery County (including Clarksville) and Sumner County extended their mask mandates that same day.

On November 16, News Channel 5 Nashville reported that 25 Tennessee counties with 66.3% of Tennessee's residents were requiring masks. These counties were: Carter, Davidson, Dyer, Greene, Hamblen, Hamilton, Hancock, Henry, Knox, Lake, Lauderdale, Madison, Montgomery, Robertson, Rutherford, Sevier, Shelby, Sullivan, Sumner, Unicoi, Warren, Washington, Weakley, Williamson, and Wilson Counties.

On November 18, Wayne County announced it would issue a mask mandate starting November 19 and ending December 29.

On December 23, Governor Lee extended Tennessee counties' authority to mandate masks through February 27. Sumner and Washington Counties extended their mask mandates that same day.

On December 29, News 8 Knoxville reported that Hamblen, Roane, and Sevier Counties were extending their mask mandates through February 27, while Grainger County was extending its mask mandate through January 31.

On January 1, 2021, WMC Action News 5 Memphis reported that Benton County issued a mask mandate that would be renewed weekly.

On February 20, 2021, WJHL reported that Washington, Carter, and Unicoi Counties were ending mask mandates in most places, but continued to recommend masks.

On February 27, 2021, Governor Bill Lee extended Tennessee counties' authority to mandate masks through April 28. Several counties, including Greene, Williamson, and Robertson, chose to lift mask mandates everywhere except governmental buildings, but continued to recommend masks.

Rutherford County chose to extend its mandate only through March 15. Montgomery County and Henry County chose to extend their mandates only through March 27. Claiborne, Hamblen, and Sullivan Counties only chose to extend their mask mandates through March 31. Sevier County only chose to extend its mandate through April 15, and planned to permanently end the mask mandate at that time.

Dyer County and Summer County elected to immediately extend their mandates all the way through April 28.

Governor Lee ended the mask mandate authority of 89 of Tennessee's 95 counties on April 27, 2021. He also requested the other 6 counties to end their mask mandates by the end of May.

== Impact on sports ==
On March 12, the National Basketball Association announced the season would be suspended for 30 days, affecting the Memphis Grizzlies. In the National Hockey League, the season was suspended for an indefinite amount of time, affecting the Nashville Predators. The National Collegiate Athletic Association cancelled all winter and spring tournaments, most notably the Division I men's and women's basketball tournaments, affecting colleges and universities statewide. On March 16, the National Junior College Athletic Association also canceled the remainder of the winter seasons as well as the spring seasons.

On September 11, the Memphis Tigers suspended football operations after at least 20 people in the program tested positive.

On November 10, the Tennessee Volunteers' game against Texas A&M, scheduled for November 14, was postponed to December 12 due to coronavirus issues on the Texas A&M team.

On November 23, the annual Tennessee-Vanderbilt football rivalry, scheduled for November 28, was postponed after a spate of coronavirus-related cancellations in the SEC. The Vanderbilt Commodores were rescheduled to play against fellow SEC team Missouri, while the Tennessee Volunteers did not have a new game for that date.

On December 5, the MTSU Blue Raiders announced the cancellation of their final scheduled game of the 2020 college football season against the UAB Blazers due to coronavirus issues. The Murfreesboro school's team finished with a 3–6 record.

== Testing sites ==
The Tennessee Department of Health provides information on testing locations by county level. According to the Tennessee Department of Health, "Locations will be added as available. For non-health department sites, individuals should call the assessment site prior to going in person. Many locations do a phone assessment to determine if an in-person assessment or test is needed. For health department sites, individuals should visit during the stated hours of operation."

== Statistics ==
=== Historical Rate of contagion, age ranges, and ethnicities from March 2020 to March 2021 and August 2021 ===
View source data.
View source data.
View source data.
View source data.
View source data.

As of January 2026, the CDC reported that COVID-19 wastewater viral activity in Tennessee remained at "moderate" levels. While emergency department visits for the virus have declined significantly since the 2021 peaks, COVID-19 continues to be monitored as part of the state's weekly respiratory illness reports alongside influenza and RSV.

== See also ==
- Timeline of the COVID-19 pandemic in the United States
- COVID-19 pandemic in the United States – for impact on the country
- COVID-19 pandemic – for impact on other countries
