= Tennessee Department of Disability and Aging =

Government agency in Tennessee, United States

Agency overview
- Formed: July 1, 2024
- Jurisdiction: Tennessee
- Employees: ~2000
- Annual budget: $398 million USD (2023-2024)
- Agency executive: Brad Turner, Commissioner
- Website: https://www.tn.gov/disability-and-aging.html

The Tennessee Department of Disability and Aging (TNDDA) is a cabinet-level agency in Tennessee designed to serve individuals with physical, intellectual, and age-related disabilities. The department was created in consolidation of prior agencies overseeing aging and disability services.

Services such as transportation assistance, caretaker support programs, employment programs, youth waivers for medical treatment, and family support programs are provided through the TNDDA for a wide range of age groups.

The department is headquartered in Nashville, with several institutions and offices across the state.

== History ==
The TNDDA was established via the Disability and Aging Act in 2024, signed into law by Governor Bill Lee, that merged the now defunct Department of Intellectual and Developmental Disabilities and the Tennessee Commission on Aging and Disability. Official operations were set to begin for July 1, 2024.

This merge was strategic in shrinking government size and also increasing the efficiency of the state's ability to provide for its aging and disabled residents.

== Organization ==
The department is led by a commissioner who is appointed by the governor of Tennessee, serving as a member of the governor's cabinet. Approximately 2,000 employees are a part of the department across west, middle, and east Tennessee.
