= Tennessee Commissioner of Financial Institutions =

The Tennessee Commissioner of Financial Institutions is the head of Tennessee's Department of Financial Institutions, which is responsible for regulating the bank system of that U.S. state. The Commissioner is appointed by the governor of Tennessee and is a member of the governor's Cabinet, which meets at least once per month, or more often to the governor's liking. Originally, a Banking Department had been created in 1913, led by a Superintendent of Banks, and then ten years later credit unions were added to the Department's responsibilities.

The first Commissioner of Banking, after the position was renamed in 1973, was Hugh F. Sinclair during the administration of Governor Winfield Dunn. The second Commissioner of Banking, under Ray Blanton, was Joe Hemphill. The last person to hold the title of Commissioner of Banking was Thomas C. Mottern, under Lamar Alexander. The first person to hold the title of Commissioner of Financial Institutions, also under Lamar Alexander, was W.C. Adams in 1983.

The Commissioner during the Ned Ray McWherter administration was Jeff H. Dyer. Don Sundquist's Commissioners, respectively, were Talmadge B. Gilley, Bill Houston, and Fred Lawson. Kevin Lavender was the Commissioner under governor Phil Bredesen, until Lavender resigned to become a senior vice president of the Fifth Third Bank corporation. Phil Bredesen appointed Greg Gonzales to serve as Acting Commissioner of Banking in his place on December 5, 2005.
