= Tennessee Commissioner of Tourist Development =

The Tennessee Commissioner of Tourist Development is the head of Tennessee's Department of Tourist Development, which is concerned with attracting tourism to the state. The Commissioner is appointed by the governor of Tennessee and is a member of the governor's Cabinet, which meets at least once per month, or more often to the governor's liking.

The Commissioner, in accordance with the rules of the state publications committee, acts through the tourism division of the Department to collect, compile, and distribute literature relating to the facilities, the advantages and attractions of the state, the historic, recreational, and scenic points and places of interest within the state, and the transportation and highway facilities of the state.

The Commissioner is also authorized to form contracts with agencies of any type that will further objectives of advertising to Tennessee nonresidents, to compile information from state government branches for advertising purposes, and to accept unconditional gifts of money for the Department of Tourist Development's purposes.

The position of Commissioner was created in 1976, along with the Department it heads. The current Commissioner under the Phil Bredesen administration, as of 2006, is Susan Whitaker. The previous Commissioner under the Don Sundquist administration was John Wade.
