= Allen-White School =

- U.S. National Register of Historic Places
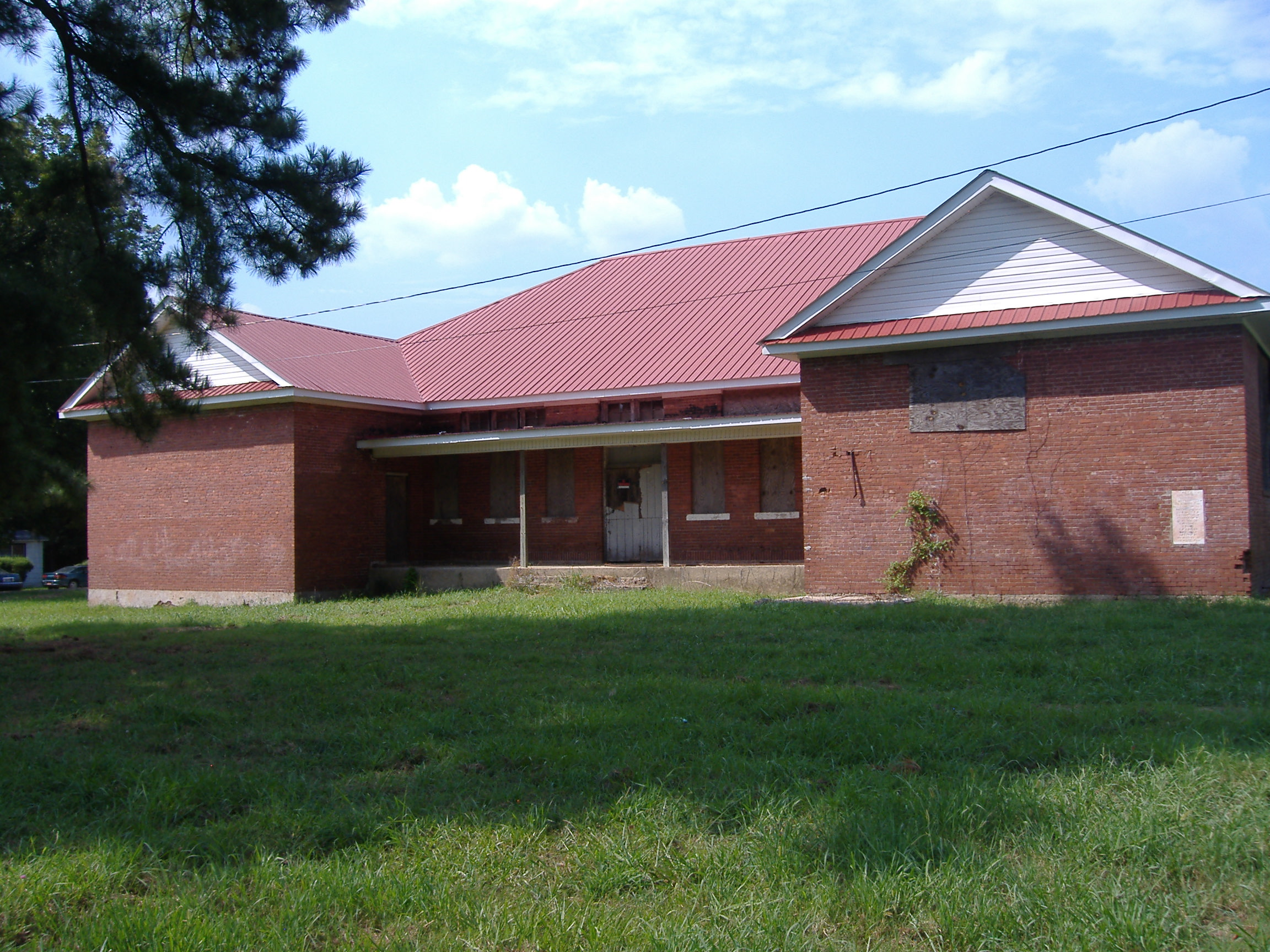
- School in August 2010, before fire

- Location within Tennessee Location within the United States
- Location: 100 Allen Extension Street; Whiteville, Tennessee; United States
- Coordinates: 35°20′01″N 89°08′51″W
- Area: 0.2 acres (0.081 ha)
- Built: 1918
- Architect: Dresslar, Fletcher; Smith, Samuel L.
- Architectural style: Rosenwald Plan 6A
- NRHP reference No.: 05001214
- Added to NRHP: November 9, 2005

The Allen-White School, also known as Hardeman County Training School, was a Rosenwald school in Whiteville, Tennessee, United States, that is listed on the National Register of Historic Places.

== Description ==
The school was started in 1905 as Hardeman County Training School, a school for African Americans that held classes in a Masonic lodge building. The school was led by Jessie C. Allen, who is one of the two men that Allen-White School was later named for. Circa 1918–1920, the school's own building was built on donated land with a $4000 bank loan obtained by the school's trustees, matched by a $4000 donation from the Julius Rosenwald Fund.

The school's second namesake, J.H. White, became school principal in the 1928–1929 school year. In 1930 the school added a junior high school program and in 1932 it expanded to include the four grades of high school. The school's first high school class graduated in 1933. Allen-White was Hardeman County's only high school for African Americans and enrolled students from throughout the county; some students boarded in Whiteville in order to attend.

After it closed as a school, the building was acquired by an organization associated with the El Canaan Missionary Baptist Church.

The building was listed on the National Register of Historic Places in 2005. It was destroyed in an arson fire in May 2012. Alumni of the school hoped to rebuild it and contracted with an engineering company to investigate the feasibility of reconstruction.

== See also ==
- National Register of Historic Places listings in Hardeman County, Tennessee
