= Turney-Hutchins House =

Historic house in Tennessee, United States

- Turney--Hutchins House
- U.S. National Register of Historic Places
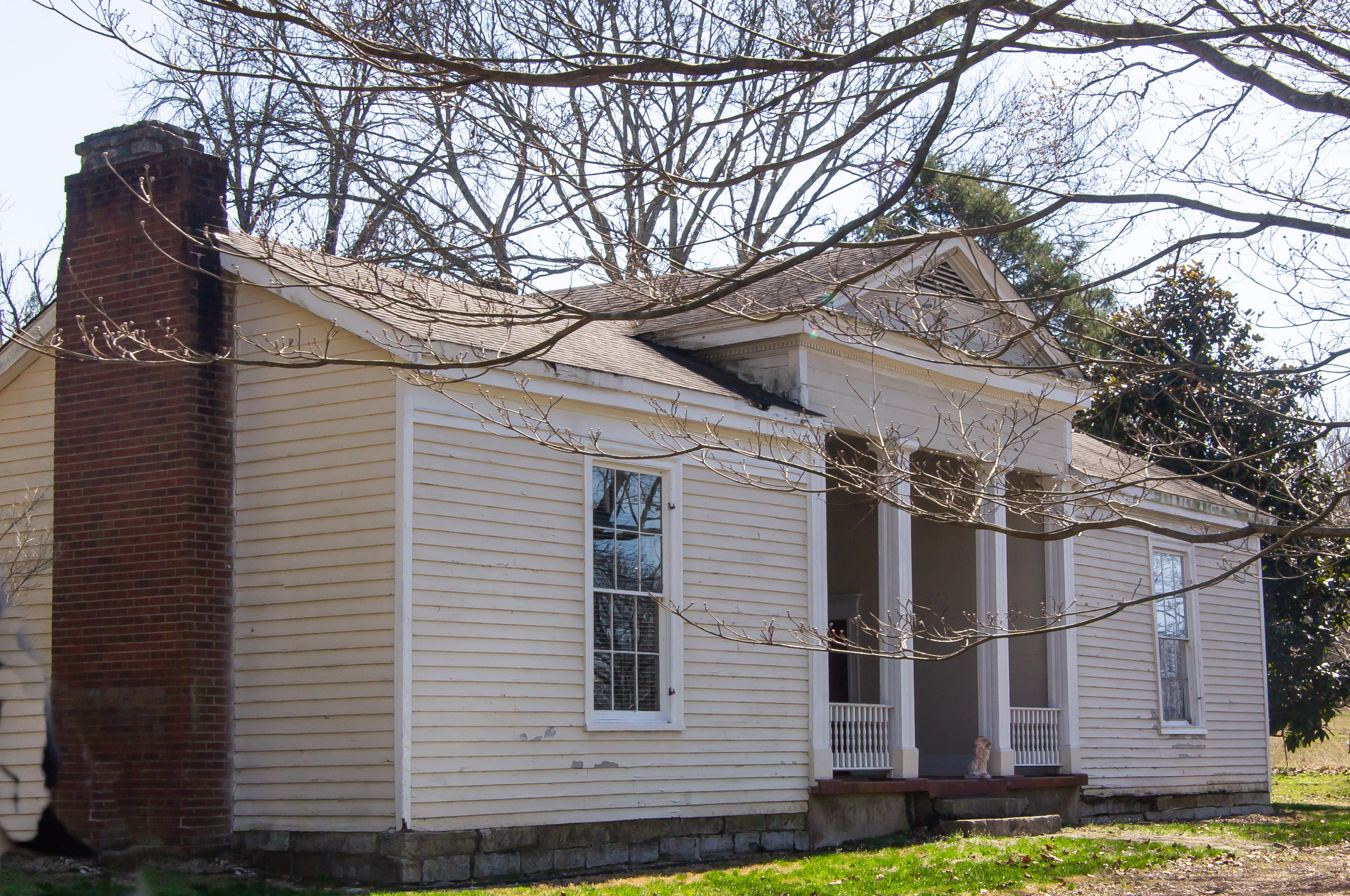

- Location within Tennessee
- Location: TN 25, Hartsville, Tennessee
- Coordinates: 36°23′31″N 86°09′12″W
- Area: 30 acres (12 ha)
- Built: 1789
- Architectural style: Greek Revival
- NRHP reference No.: 92000780
- Added to NRHP: July 1, 1992

The Turney-Hutchins House is a historic house in Hartsville, Tennessee. It was the home of two veterans of the American Revolutionary War. It is listed on the National Register of Historic Places.

== History ==
The house was built as a two-story log house circa 1789 for Henry Turney, a veteran of the American Revolutionary War of 1775–1783 who received a 1,280-acre land grant for his service in 1788. In 1798, it was acquired by Captain William Alexander, another veteran of the Revolutionary War who worked as a tanner. President Andrew Jackson often visited his friend Alexander in the house. The latter's daughter married William Hall, who served as the seventh governor of Tennessee from 1829 to 1829.

The house was acquired by John Hutchins in 1853, and expanded in a T shape by carpenter Samuel Andrews circa 1857. In 1889, it was sold to J. W. Darwin and J. A. Pruett. By the 1990s, it belonged to one of their descendants.

== Architectural significance ==
The house was designed in the Greek Revival architectural style during the 1857 expansion. It has been listed on the National Register of Historic Places since July 1, 1992.
