= Whiteville Correctional Facility =

Prison in Tennessee, United States

Coordinates: 35°17′58″N 89°09′08″W

- Interactive map of Whiteville Correctional Facility
- Location: 1440 Union Springs Road Whiteville, Tennessee
- Status: open
- Security class: medium security
- Capacity: 1,536
- Opened: 2002
- Managed by: CoreCivic
- Director: Robert Adams Jr.

Whiteville Correctional Facility is a privately operated prison for men located in Whiteville, Hardeman County, Tennessee. The facility opened in 2002 and has a capacity of 1536 medium-security inmates.

As of 2016, Tennessee houses state inmates in four private prisons. The state's Private Prison Contracting Act of 1986, however, authorizes one single private prison for state inmates. As of 2016 Tennessee technically contracts directly with CoreCivic (formerly Corrections Corporation of America) for inmates held at South Central Correctional Facility. For Whiteville and two others, the state circumvents the statute by contracting with the local county. In turn the county signs an agreement with CoreCivic.

Whiteville is the location of another prison, the Hardeman County Correctional Center, less than a mile south of Whiteville Correctional Facility on the same road. It is also owned and operated by CoreCivic, opened in 1997, and also houses medium-security prisoners for the state.
