= Hardeman County Correctional Center =

Privately operated prison in Tennessee, US

Coordinates: 35°17′58″N 89°09′08″W

Hardeman County Correctional Facility
- Interactive map of Hardeman County Correctional Facility
- Location: 2520 Union Springs Road Whiteville, Tennessee
- Status: open
- Security class: medium security
- Capacity: 1,976
- Opened: 1997
- Managed by: CoreCivic
- Director: Warden Grady Perry

Hardeman County Correctional Facility is a privately operated prison for men located in Whiteville, Hardeman County, Tennessee. The facility opened in 1997 and has a capacity of 1,976 medium-security inmates.

As of 2016, Tennessee houses state inmates in four private prisons. The state's Private Prison Contracting Act of 1986, however, authorizes one single private prison for state inmates. As of 2016 Tennessee technically contracts directly with CoreCivic (formerly Corrections Corporation of America (CCA)) for inmates held at South Central Correctional Facility. For Hardeman County and two others, the state circumvents the statute by contracting with the local county. In turn the county signs an agreement with CoreCivic.

Whiteville is the location of another prison, the Whiteville Correctional Facility, less than a mile north of HCCF and on the same road. It is also owned and operated by CoreCivic, opened in 2002, and also houses medium-security prisoners for the state.

== Notable inmates ==
Notable criminals incarcerated at the facility include:

- Letalvis Cobbins - convicted of the murders of Channon Christian and Christopher Newsom
