= Tennessee Department of Revenue =

Government agency in Tennessee, United States

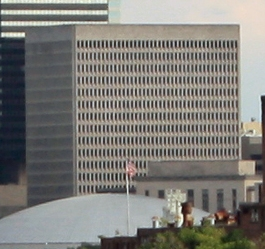
- Tennessee Department of Revenue headquarters in Nashville

Agency overview
- Formed: 1923 (though the name originates from 1959)
- Type: Revenue service
- Jurisdiction: Government of Tennessee
- Headquarters: 500 Deaderick St. Nashville, Tennessee 37242; United States
- Agency executive: David Gerregano, Commissioner
- Website: www.tn.gov/revenue/

The Tennessee Department of Revenue (TDOR) is an agency within the Tennessee state government that is responsible for administering the state’s tax laws and motor vehicle title and registration laws. More than 800 people work for the Department of Revenue.

The Department collects about 87 percent of total state revenue. During the 2018 fiscal year, it collected $14.5 billion in state taxes and fees and more than $2.8 billion in taxes and fees for local governments.

The Department is led by Commissioner David Gerregano.

== See also ==
- Tennessee Department of Financial Institutions
- Tennessee General Assembly
