= Tennessee Department of Financial Institutions =

Government agency in Tennessee, United States

The Tennessee Department of Financial Institutions (TDFI) is a Cabinet-level agency within Tennessee state government, currently led by Greg Gonzales, Commissioner of Financial Institutions. The department is responsible for regulating Tennessee's banking system, including state-chartered banks and credit unions, and handling consumer complaints involving state regulated financial institutions. The department is divided into the Administrative/Legal Division, Bank Division, Compliance Division, Consumer Resources Division, and the Credit Union Division - each of which is led by an Assistant Commissioner.

The Banking Department, created in 1913, was headed by the Superintendent of Banks when it was first established, ten years later credit unions were added to its responsibilities. Over the next eighty-five years, the department made a final name change and increased regulatory responsibilities to cover trust companies, licensed business and industrial development corporations (BIDCOs), industrial loan and thrift offices, insurance premium finance companies, mortgage companies, check cashers, deferred presentment services companies, money transmitters, and title loan companies.

== See also ==
- Tennessee Department of Revenue
