= Whiteville, Tennessee =

- Town
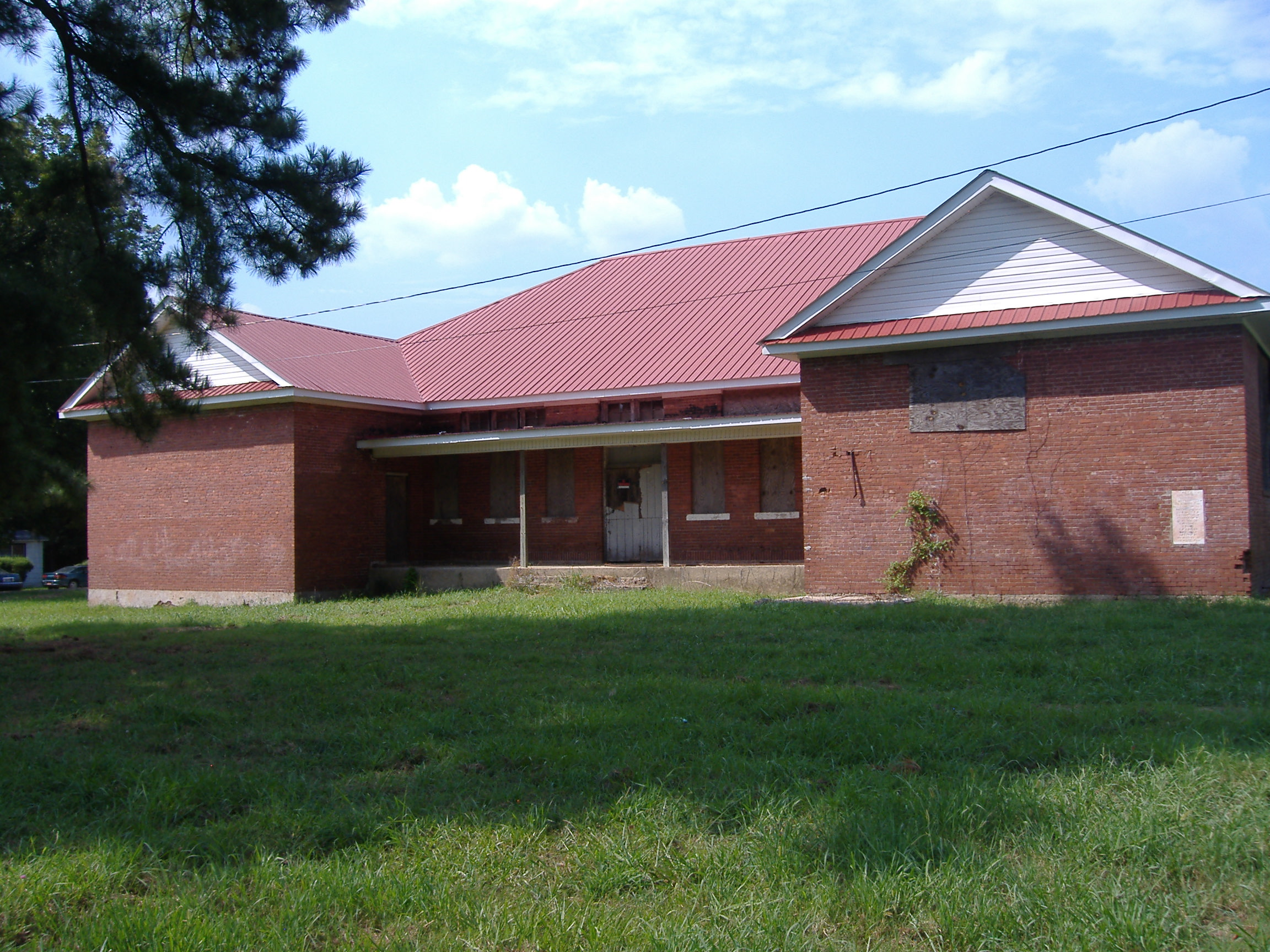
- The former Allen-White School in Whiteville, August 2010
- Motto: "Gateway to Hardeman County"
- Location of Whiteville in Hardeman County, Tennessee
- Coordinates: 35°19′28″N 89°8′45″W
- Country: United States
- State: Tennessee
- County: Hardeman
- Settled: c. 1800
- Incorporated: 1901
- Named for: Dr. John White, early settler

Government
  - Mayor: Gene Bowden

Area
  - Total: 2.64 sq mi (6.83 km^{2})
  - Land: 2.64 sq mi (6.83 km^{2})
  - Water: 0 sq mi (0.00 km^{2})
- Elevation: 490 ft (150 m)

Population (2020)
  - Total: 2,606
  - Density: 988.5/sq mi (381.65/km^{2})
- Time zone: UTC−6 (Central (CST))
  - Summer (DST): UTC−5 (CDT)
- ZIP Code: 38075
- Area codes: 731, 901
- FIPS code: 47-80540
- GNIS feature ID: 1274472
- Website: www.townofwhiteville.com

Whiteville is a town in Hardeman County, Tennessee, United States. The population was 2,606 at the 2020 census and 4,638 at the 2010 census, Whiteville is the location of two privately owned prisons, Whiteville Correctional Facility and Hardeman County Correctional Center. Whiteville is also home to Allen-White School, a former Rosenwald school that was placed on the National Register of Historic Places in 2005.

Whiteville was founded in the early 1800s as a trading post, and was formally incorporated in 1901.The town and its economy grew primarily through cotton production.

== Geography ==
Whiteville is located in northwestern Hardeman County at 35°19′28″N 89°8′45″W (35.324496, −89.145721). U.S. Route 64 runs through the southern part of the town, leading southeast 11 miles (18 km) to Bolivar, the county seat, and southwest 13 miles (21 km) to Somerville. Tennessee State Route 100 runs east from Whiteville 30 miles (48 km) to Henderson. State Route 179 runs north from the center of Whiteville 15 miles (24 km) to Interstate 40 at Willis.

According to the United States Census Bureau, Whiteville has a total area of 2.7 square miles (7.1 km^{2}), all land. The town is drained by the headwaters of Hickory Creek, which flows north to the Hatchie River.

Historical population
| Census | Pop. | Note | %± |
|---|---|---|---|
| 1860 | 186 | | — |
| 1870 | 80 | | −57.0% |
| 1880 | 116 | | 45.0% |
| 1890 | 209 | | 80.2% |
| 1900 | 463 | | 121.5% |
| 1910 | 741 | | 60.0% |
| 1920 | 749 | | 1.1% |
| 1930 | 692 | | −7.6% |
| 1940 | 796 | | 15.0% |
| 1950 | 794 | | −0.3% |
| 1960 | 757 | | −4.7% |
| 1970 | 992 | | 31.0% |
| 1980 | 1,270 | | 28.0% |
| 1990 | 1,050 | | −17.3% |
| 2000 | 3,148 | | 199.8% |
| 2010 | 4,638 | | 47.3% |
| 2020 | 2,606 | | −43.8% |

== Demographics ==
=== Racial and ethnic composition ===
Whiteville town, Tennessee – Racial and ethnic composition Note: the US Census treats Hispanic/Latino as an ethnic category. This table excludes Latinos from the racial categories and assigns them to a separate category. Hispanics/Latinos may be of any race.
| Race / Ethnicity (NH = Non-Hispanic) | Pop 2000 | Pop 2010 | Pop 2020 | % 2000 | % 2010 | % 2020 |
|---|---|---|---|---|---|---|
| White alone (NH) | 1,179 | 1,765 | 1,003 | 37.45% | 38.06% | 38.49% |
| Black or African American alone (NH) | 1,917 | 2,785 | 1,471 | 60.90% | 60.05% | 56.45% |
| Native American or Alaska Native alone (NH) | 3 | 5 | 4 | 0.10% | 0.11% | 0.15% |
| Asian alone (NH) | 2 | 4 | 5 | 0.06% | 0.09% | 0.19% |
| Native Hawaiian or Pacific Islander alone (NH) | 0 | 0 | 0 | 0.00% | 0.00% | 0.00% |
| Other race alone (NH) | 0 | 0 | 6 | 0.00% | 0.00% | 0.23% |
| Mixed race or Multiracial (NH) | 23 | 16 | 44 | 0.73% | 0.34% | 1.69% |
| Hispanic or Latino (any race) | 24 | 63 | 73 | 0.76% | 1.36% | 2.80% |
| Total | 3,148 | 4,638 | 2,606 | 100.00% | 100.00% | 100.00% |

=== 2020 census ===
The initial results of the 2020 United States census listed 2,606 people, 289 households, and 203 families residing in the town. The town appealed these numbers, which did not include the population of the town's two prisons. In 2023, the Census Bureau released updated numbers, increasing the population count to 4,564.^{a}

== Notes ==
U.S. Census web page not updated as of February 18, 2023.

=== 2000 census ===
As of the census of 2000, there were 3,148 people, 457 households, and 308 families residing in the town. The population density was 1,317.7 inhabitants per square mile (508.8/km^{2}). There were 510 housing units at an average density of 213.5 per square mile (82.4/km^{2}). The racial makeup of the town was 38.02% White, 60.93% African American, 0.10% Native American, 0.06% Asian, 0.13% from other races, and 0.76% from two or more races. Hispanic or Latino of any race were 0.76% of the population.

There were 457 households, out of which 29.5% had children under the age of 18 living with them, 37.4% were married couples living together, 26.5% had a female householder with no husband present, and 32.4% were non-families. Of all households 29.3% were made up of individuals, and 16.0% had someone living alone who was 65 years of age or older. The average household size was 2.53 and the average family size was 3.12.

In the town, the population was spread out, with 10.5% under the age of 18, 16.9% from 18 to 24, 51.4% from 25 to 44, 14.3% from 45 to 64, and 6.9% who were 65 years of age or older. The median age was 32 years. For every 100 females there were 387.3 males. For every 100 females age 18 and over, there were 483.4 males.

The median income for a household in the town was $22,368, and the median income for a family was $28,603. Males had a median income of $22,050 versus $19,013 for females. The per capita income for the town was $11,310. About 21.0% of families and 18.7% of the population were below the poverty line, including 18.4% of those under age 18 and 20.6% of those age 65 or over.

== Education ==
The Tennessee Colleges of Applied Technology have a location in Whiteville.

== Notable people ==
- Benjamin Elton Cox, civil rights activist
- Walter F. Lineberger, United States Representative
- Calvin Newborn, jazz guitarist
- Phineas Newborn Jr., jazz pianist

== In popular culture ==
- The 2007 crime film In the Valley of Elah was shot in Whiteville.

== See also ==
- List of towns in Tennessee
