= Tennessee Department of Tourist Development =

Government agency in Tennessee, United States

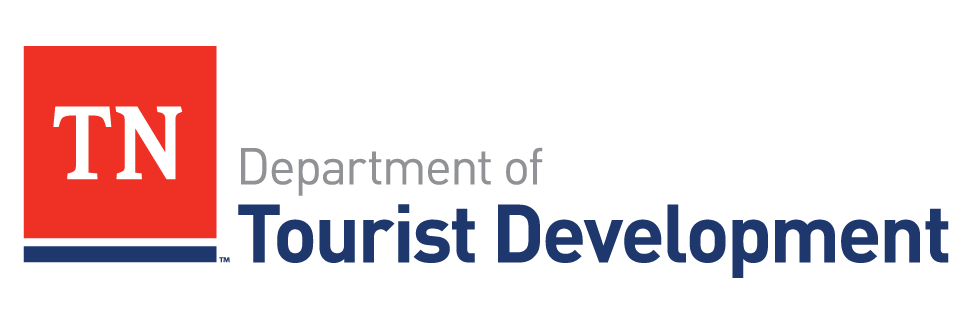

The Tennessee Department of Tourist Development (TDTD) is a Cabinet-level agency within the Tennessee state government, headed by the Tennessee Commissioner of Tourist Development, who is currently Mark Ezell. The Department is responsible for attracting tourism to Tennessee and marketing to residents both in the United States and internationally. Annually, $100,000, or however much is necessary of that amount, is appropriated from the general fund of the state when not otherwise appropriated for carrying out the Department's duties.

When the Department was first created in 1976, it was divided into the tourism division and the hotel and restaurant division. Divisions may be abolished or added by the Commissioner with governor approval, and the Commissioner can also transfer to the tourism division any employees of the department. The Commissioner appoints a director of the tourist division, who is required by statute to be a competent person, properly informed on public contracts, publicity, tourism, and tourist promotion, and having executive ability. The tourist division is also responsible for managing seventeen welcome centers across Tennessee's interstate highways, from which tourists may make hotel and campground reservations.

== Welcome centers ==
There are sixteen welcome centers across Tennessee, mostly located at major entrances into the state, such as immediately off interstates and major highways (14 off interstates and 3 off U.S. Routes). These welcome centers usually consist of a large building with restroom facilities, brochures, staffed desks for people to ask for assistance, picnic areas, and large parking lots. In addition to the aforementioned, there is a large flagpole with the state flag in front of the building. All of the below-listed welcome centers are open 24 hours a day, except for the I-40 welcome center, which closes at 10:30 PM CST. The headquarters for the state's welcome centers is called Welcome Centers and is located in Nashville. More information can be found at. There are three welcome centers each on I-24 and I-40, two welcome centers each on I-75 and I-65, and one welcome center each on I-155, I-81, and I-55. There are two unique welcome centers located in Mountain City and Pigeon Forge, respectively. The Mountain City welcome center serves the Johnson County Chamber of Commerce and the Pigeon Forge location serves the world-famous Pigeon Forge tourist district.

Welcome centers in West, Middle, and East Tennessee
Grand Division	Interstate or U.S. Route	City	County in which the welcome center is located	References
West Tennessee	I-155	Dyersburg	Dyer County	
West Tennessee	I-40	Memphis	Shelby County	
West Tennessee	I-55	Memphis	Shelby County NOTE: This welcome center is temporarily closed until further notice.	
West Tennessee	U.S. Route 79	Memphis	Shelby County	
Middle Tennessee	I-65	Ardmore	Giles County	
Middle Tennessee	I-40	Carthage	Smith County	
Middle Tennessee	I-24	Clarksville	Montgomery County	
Middle Tennessee	I-65	Portland	Robertson County	
East Tennessee	I-81	Bristol	Sullivan County	
East Tennessee	I-24	Chattanooga	Hamilton County	
East Tennessee	I-75	East Ridge	Hamilton County	
East Tennessee	I-26	Erwin	Unicoi County	
East Tennessee	I-40	Hartford	Cocke County	
East Tennessee	I-24	Jasper	Marion County	
East Tennessee	I-75	Jellico	Campbell County	
East Tennessee	U.S. Route 421	Mountain City	Johnson County	
East Tennessee	U.S. Route 441	Pigeon Forge	Sevier County	
