= Trousdale Turner Correctional Center =

Medium security correctional facility in Tennessee, United States

Coordinates: 36°21′05″N 86°05′29″W

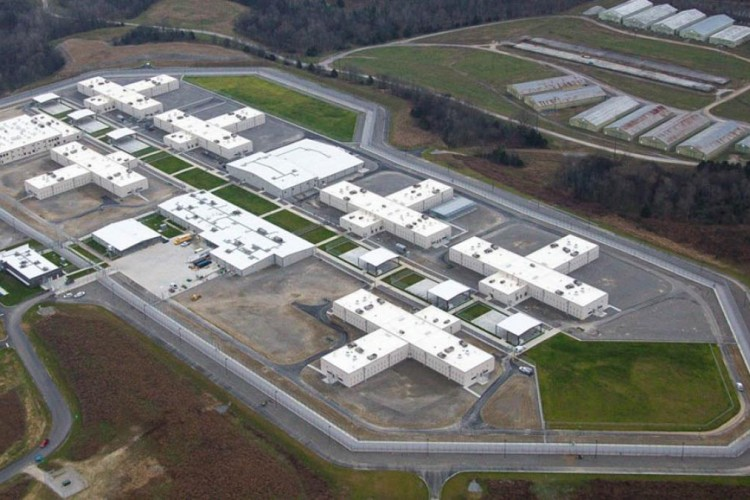
- Aerial view
- Interactive map of Trousdale Turner Correctional Center
- Location: 140 Macon Way Hartsville, Tennessee
- Status: open
- Security class: Medium, few Max.
- Capacity: 2,672
- Opened: 2016
- Managed by: CoreCivic
- Warden: Sr. Warden Allen Beard Jr.

The Trousdale Turner Correctional Center is a private prison for men, located in Hartsville, Trousdale County, Tennessee, owned and operated by CoreCivic (formerly Corrections Corporation of America) under contract with the Tennessee Department of Correction.

The facility opened in 2016, and is located on the site of the canceled Hartsville Nuclear Plant. It holds a maximum of 2672 male inmates at medium security. There are seven housing units within the facility, each housing different number of inmates. The following, three-pod, housing units each house a maximum of 360 inmates: D, C, F, B and E. Housing unit W contains four pods, each holding a maximum of 128 inmates, for a total of 512. The inmates in this housing unit live in an open-bay setting; they are not in cells but sleep side by side in bunks. The segregation unit, A, contains five pods with a maximum capacity of 360.

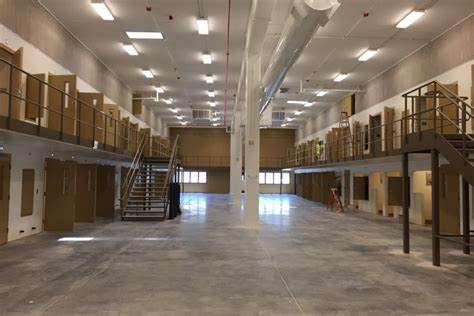
Pod Dayroom in Standard Unit

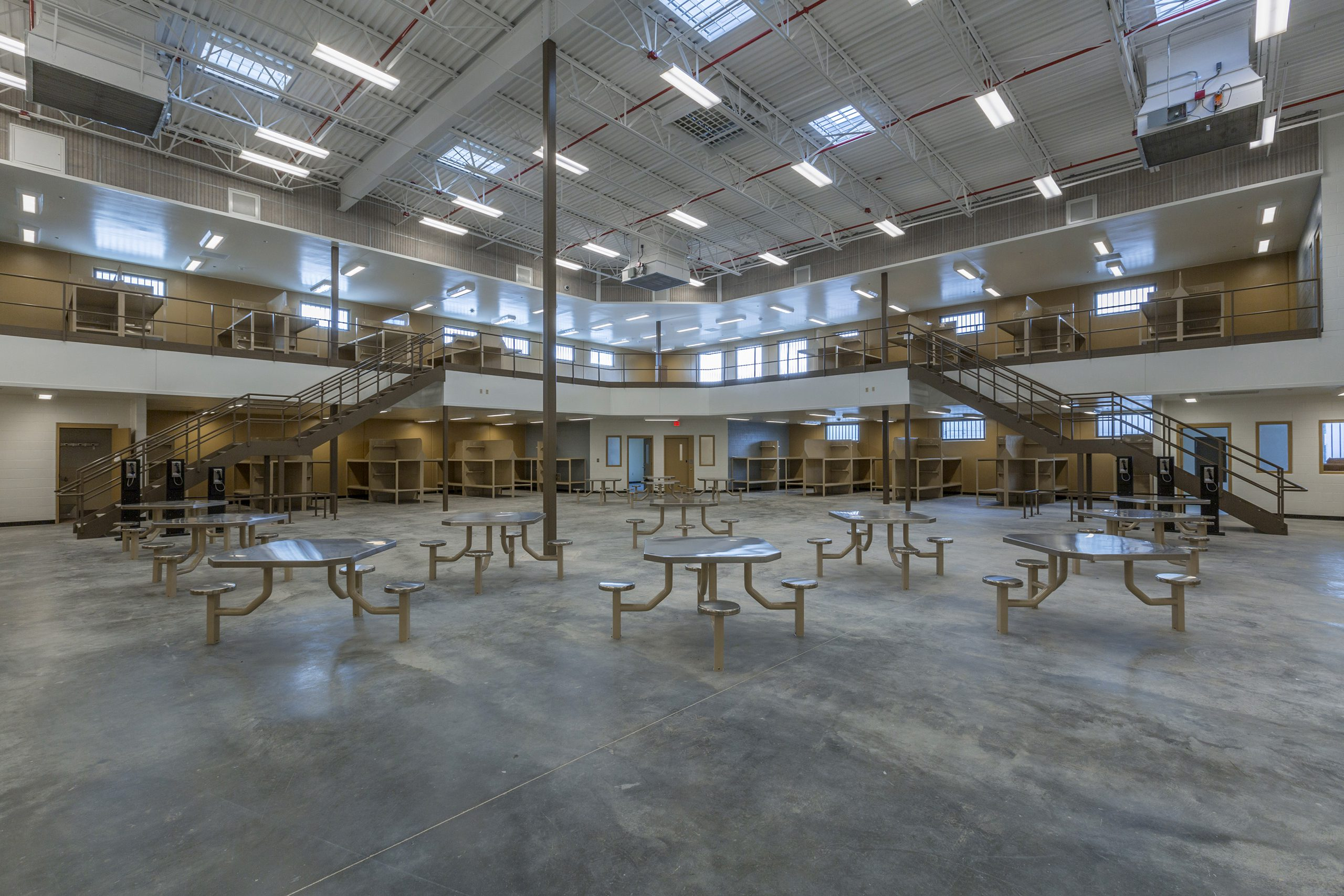
W Unit Dayroom

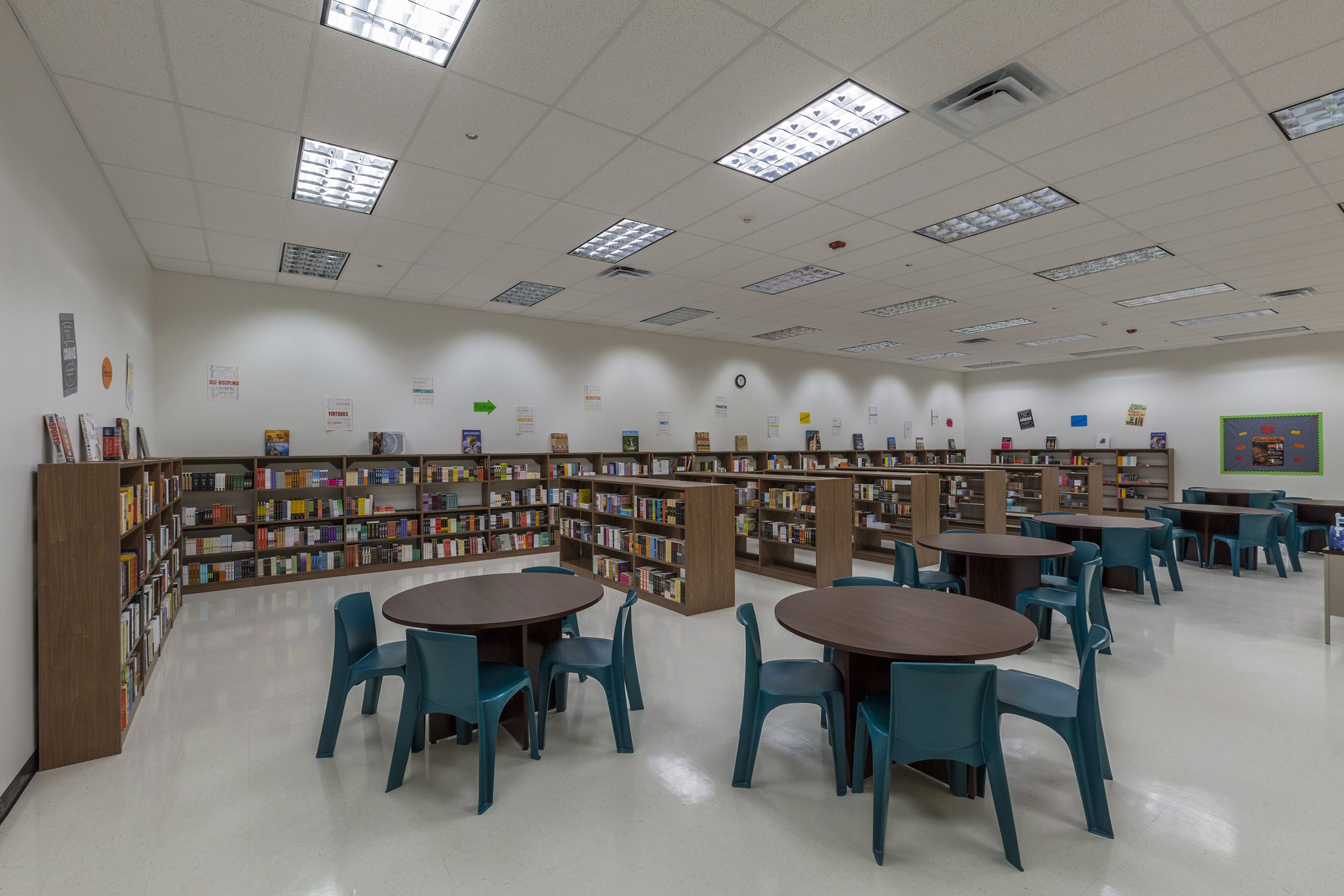
Library

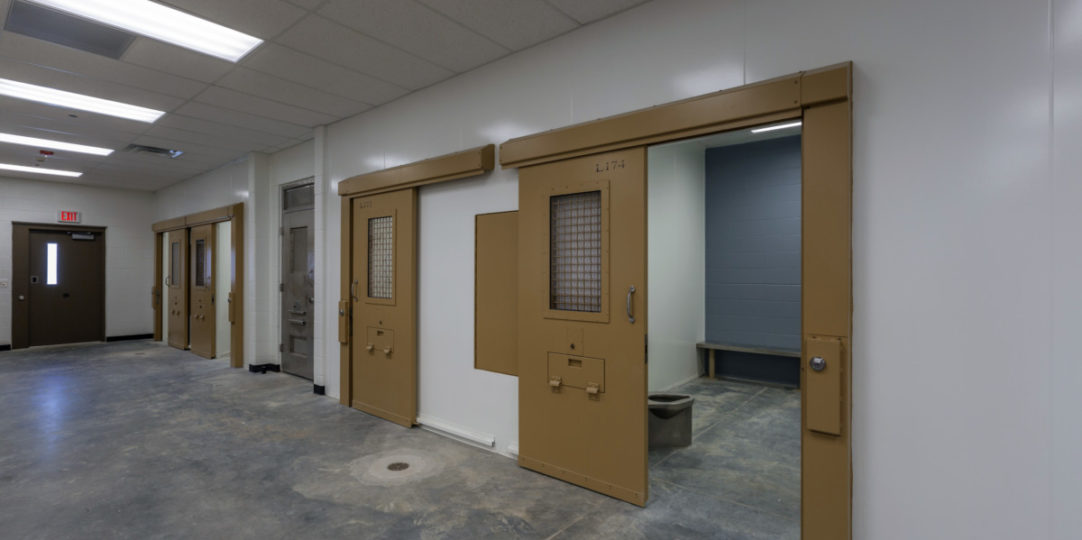
Intake

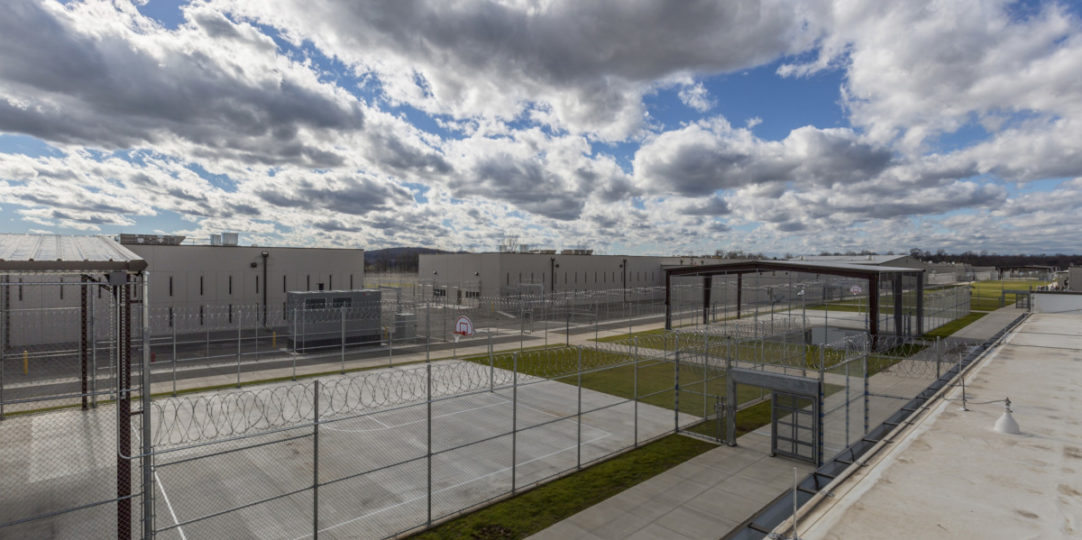
Outdoor Recreation Area

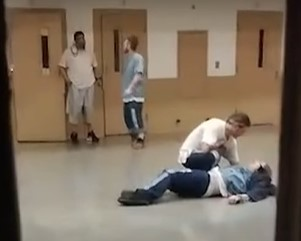
Injured Inmate Awaiting Care

== History ==
Between its opening in January 2016 and May, an inmate was stabbed on February 26 when an officer left a housing unit unattended, the facility's newly-appointed warden resigned by early March without explanation, a TDOC official formally complained that CCA officers had no control over the prisoners, the entire facility unexpectedly halted taking new state inmates because of these "growing pains", and an officer was assaulted.

On September 6, 2017 an officer was assaulted in E Unit by an inmate high on methamphetamine. The inmate used a homemade weapon to stab the officer multiple times. The officer was unable to escape the attack, which resulted in the inmates in his pod coming to his aid.

On December 6, 2018 inmate Ross Anderson committed suicide inside of his cell.

On June 15, 2019 at approximately 3:00 P.M. CDT an inmate was found deceased in his cell during count. Further investigation revealed the inmate had been in an altercation with another inmate.

On August 30, 2019 an inmate in W unit attacked and sexually assaulted a mental health staff member. The staff member was flown to Vanderbilt Medical Center for treatment, however, the attack resulted in a loss of vision for that staff member. The matter is currently under investigation.

On January 25, 2020 a protective custody inmate was fatally stabbed by another inmate in the segregation unit.

on December 17, 2020 an inmate was fatally wounded by his cellmate while being housed in the segregation unit.

In 2020, an outbreak of COVID 19 at the Trousdale Turner Correctional Center made Trousdale County the county with the highest per capita infection rate in the United States in early May. As of May 8, 1,284 prisoners at Trousdale had tested positive for the coronavirus, as had 50 employees and contractors at the facility. By August, three infected prisoners had died and a total of 1,379 prisoners had been infected.

With the various issues inside the facility and the recent events of COVID-19, the warden has decided to place the facility under lockdown till further notice.

In February 2021, inmate Terry Childress was murdered at the facility, the family won a $10 million settlement in February 2022.

On October 14, 2022 two correctional officers were flown to Nashville hospitals after being stabbed. Two inmates made an unprovoked attached against the officers around 8:45 pm CDT.

On November 6, 2022 three correctional officers were assaulted by inmates refusing to comply with orders to prepare for a scheduled head count. Th officers were treated by medical staff at the facility before being transported to area hospitals for further treatment.

On June 20, 2023 the facility was placed on lockdown following multiple incidents resulted in one inmate deceased and two corrections officers transported to local hospitals for medical treatment. At 4:41 AM CDT an unresponsive inmate was found and transported to a nearby hospital where he was pronounced dead around 5:45 am CDT. Then at 8:11 AM CDT two correctional officers were assaulted by two inmates who refused to comply with order during the morning meal process.

On August 20, 2024 the Department of Justice announced it would be conducting a civil rights investigation into the conditions at TTCC. The Civil Rights Division’s Special Litigation Section is conducting this investigation jointly with the U.S. Attorney’s Office for the Middle District of Tennessee. “Publicly available information suggests that Trousdale Turner has been plagued by serious problems since it first opened its doors,” said United States Attorney Henry C. Leventis. “This includes reports of staffing shortages, physical and sexual assaults, murders, and a 188% turnover rate among prison guards just last year.

According to the Department of Justice the facility experienced five inmates stabbed within a three week period in 2024; at least 196 assaults, two murders, and 15 deaths between July 2022 and June 2023; and at least 90 sexual misconducts during the same timeframe; and 97 knives found in June 2023 alone.

In October 2024 four prison staff members were hospitalized after an attack by an inmate with a weapon. The inmate initially attacked a food service worker before three correctional officers responded and were subsequently attacked. Additional officers arrived and secured the inmate.

On February 1, 2025 an inmate was rushed to a hospital after a fight with other inmates around 9:00 pm CDT.

On February 12, 2025 CoreCivic announced Warden Vince Vantell was placed on administrative leave and it is not related to the Department of Justice investigation.

== Legal status ==
As of 2016, Tennessee houses state inmates in four private prisons. The state's Private Prison Contracting Act of 1986, however, authorizes one single private prison for state inmates. As of 2016 Tennessee technically contracts directly with CoreCivic for inmates held at South Central Correctional Facility. For Trousdale and the two others, the state circumvents the statute by contracting with the local county. In turn the county signs an agreement with CoreCivic.
