= Lisa Piercey =

American physician

Lisa Piercey is an American physician and served as the 15th Commissioner of the Tennessee Department of Health, appointed by Governor Bill Lee in 2019.

Piercey is from Trenton, Tennessee and attended Peabody High School. She received a BS in chemistry from Lipscomb University, and her medical degree from East Tennessee State University Quillen College of Medicine. She received an MBA from Bethel University.

Piercey was a practicing pediatrician in the Jackson, Tennessee area. Piercey served as Executive Vice President of System Services at West Tennessee Healthcare.

Piercy led the State of Tennessee's medical response to the coronavirus pandemic. She faced some criticism due to the state's handling of the pandemic, including vaccination campaigns, public health measures, and particularly the state's decision to halt vaccine outreach efforts aimed at adolescents. his decision was made after pressure from some state lawmakers who opposed vaccinating minors without parental consent. Piercey resigned as Commissioner of the Tennessee Department of Health effective May 31, 2022. Following her resignation, Governor Lee appointed Piercey to the Board of Trustees of East Tennessee State University; her appointed was rejected by the House Education Administration Committee of the Tennessee House of Representatives.
