= Mark Ezell =

American government official

Mark Ezell is the Commissioner of the Tennessee Department of Tourist Development, appointed to the position by Governor Bill Lee in January 2019.

Ezell was born and raised in Tennessee. He graduated from Lipscomb University and Tennessee Technological University.

Prior to his appointment as Commissioner, Ezell worked for over 30 years at Purity Dairies, a Nashville-based dairy company founded by his family. At Purity, he held several leadership roles, including Vice President of Marketing, where he was responsible for branding, marketing strategies, and customer engagement initiatives. While at Purity Dairies (later a subsidiary of Dean Foods), Ezell Ezell helped create the "Milk Mustache - Got Milk?" campaign. Ezell left Purity Dairies in 2018.

In 2020, Governor Bill Lee appointed Ezell as Director of the Economic Recovery Group, created to respond to the economic impacts of the coronavirus pandemic.
