= Governor of Tennessee =

Head of government of the U.S. state of Tennessee

- State seal

- Flag of the governor

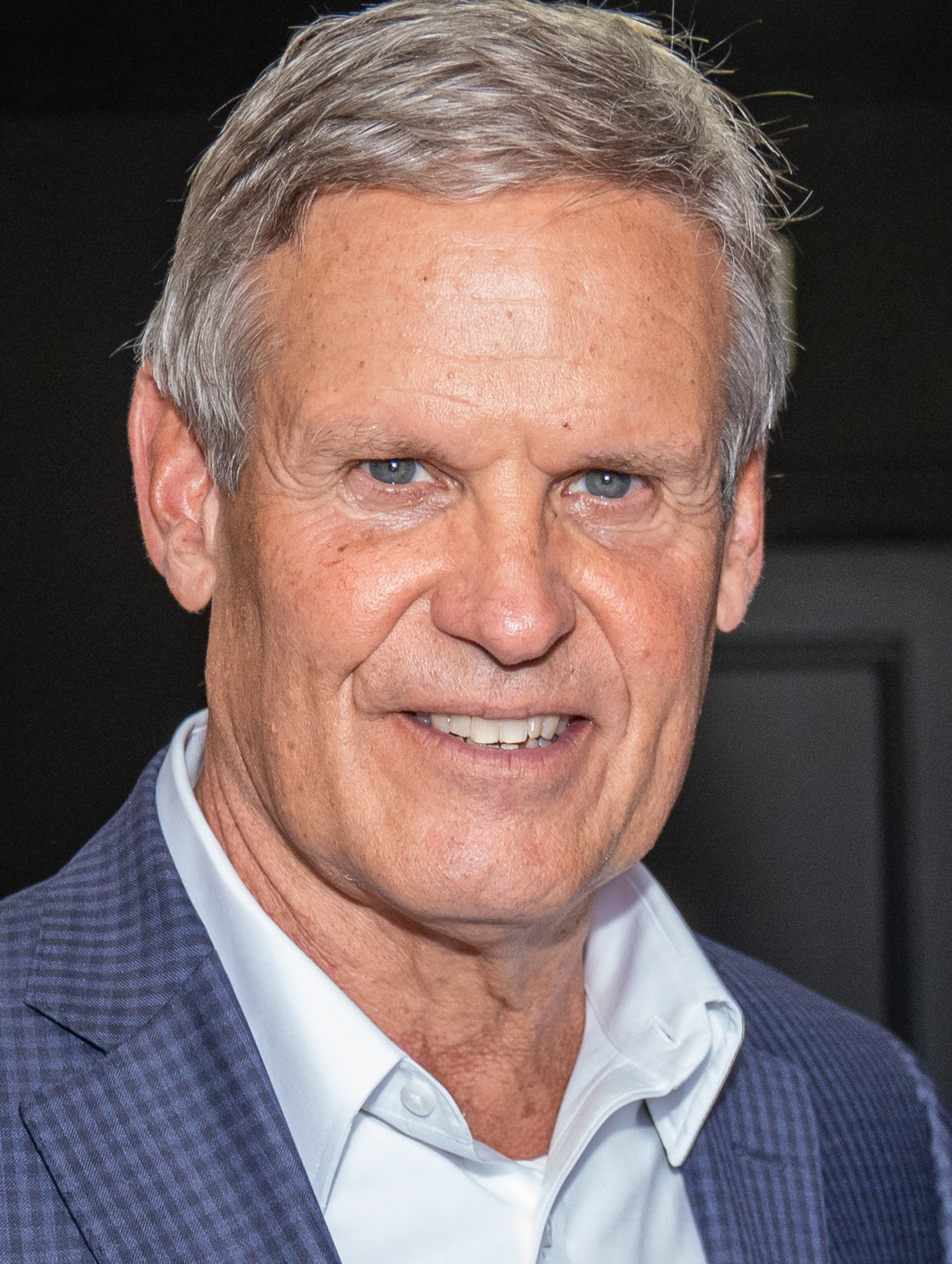
- Incumbent; Bill Lee since January 19, 2019
- Government of Tennessee
- Style: Governor (informal); The Honorable (formal)
- Status: Head of state; Head of government
- Residence: Tennessee Governor's Mansion
- Term length: Four years, renewable once consecutively
- Constituting instrument: Tennessee Constitution of 1796
- Inaugural holder: John Sevier
- Formation: March 30, 1796 (230 years ago)
- Succession: Line of succession
- Deputy: Lieutenant Governor of Tennessee (Note: The Speaker of the Senate holds the title and succession); Deputy Governor of Tennessee (Note: Not on line of succession)
- Salary: $204,336 (2022)
- Website: Official website

The governor of Tennessee is the head of government of the U.S. state of Tennessee and the commander-in-chief of the state's military forces. The governor is the only official in the Tennessee state government who is directly elected by the voters of the entire state.

The current governor is Bill Lee, a member of the Republican Party, who took office on January 19, 2019, as the state's 50th governor.

== Qualifications ==
The Tennessee Constitution provides that the governor must be at least 30 years old and must have lived in the state for at least seven years before being elected to the office. The governor is elected to a four-year term and may serve no more than two terms consecutively. There are only two other U.S. states, New Jersey and Hawaii, where the governor is the only state official to be elected statewide.

== Powers and duties ==
The Tennessee Constitution provides that "The supreme executive power of this state shall be vested in a governor." Most state department heads and some members of boards and commissions are appointed by the governor.

The governor is the commander-in-chief of the state's National Guard and the state militia, except when they have been called into federal service. The governor chairs the Tennessee Board of Regents, the University of Tennessee's Board of Trustees, and holds seats on the State Funding Board, State Building Commission, Board of Equalization, Tennessee Local Development Authority, School Bond Authority, and Tennessee Industrial and Agricultural Development Commission.

The Constitution grants the governor the power to veto laws passed by the Tennessee General Assembly, as well as line-item veto authority for individual spending items included in bills passed by the legislature. In either situation, the governor's veto can be overridden by a simple majority of both houses of the legislature. If a governor exercises the veto authority after the legislature has adjourned, the veto stands. It is uncommon for Tennessee governors to use their veto power, likely because it is relatively easy for the General Assembly to override a veto.

Article III Section 9 of the state constitution empowers the governor to call the General Assembly into special session, with the subjects to be considered limited to matters specified in the proclamation.

=== Nominations of justices ===
In the state of Tennessee, one of the powers of the governor is to appoint justices to the state, local, and appellate courts through a system known as the Tennessee Plan. The process includes nominees being vetted by a judicial nomination commission before being appointed. After their initial term, judges are required to run in a retention election to determine if they will serve another term in the courts.

=== Cabinet appointments ===
The Tennessee Governor's Cabinet is made up of seven key staff members and 23 Executive Departments. Key staff members include Chief Operating Manager, Chief of Staff, Special Assistant, Senior Adviser, Communications Director, Policy Director, and Deputy to the Governor. The Executive Department cabinet includes Commissioners of Agriculture, Commerce, Correction, Developmental Disability, Education, Environment, General Services, Health, Finance, Labor, among others. Most executive department positions are chosen by the governor, but some like secretary of state, attorney general, treasurer, and lieutenant governor are chosen by popular statewide elections with limited input from the governor. State comptrollers and department heads are typically chosen by panels or commissions independent of gubernatorial interference, the most common chosen in this way across the United States being the head of Education, Natural Resources, Labor, and high Education boards.

Before being inaugurated as governor, then Governor-elect Bill Lee announced two appointments: Maj. Gen. Jeff Holmes for the Department of Military and Ret. Lt. Col. Courtney Rogers for the Department of Veterans Services. In early January, Governor Bill Lee announced three new cabinet appointments: Dr. Lisa Piercey to the Department of Health, Brad Turner to the Department of Developmental Disability, and Christi Branscom to the Department of General Services. Along with announcing new cabinet members, Bill Lee also announced a new website where Tennesseans can apply to work in the administration and check on policy issues called Bill Lee Transition

=== State of the State address ===
Article III Section 11 of the Tennessee Constitution provides that the governor shall, "from time to time, give to the General Assembly information of the state of the government, and recommend for their consideration such measures as he shall judge expedient."

The State of the State address is typically delivered in January at the beginning of the General Assembly's session and is used to outline priorities and a legislative agenda for the coming legislative session, especially for a new administration.

For example, in his first State of the State speech in 2019 Bill Lee announced his plan to add more funds to the state's rainy day fund:

"As our state continues to grow, we are committed to remaining among the most fiscally sound and best managed states in America. We live in prosperous days, but it's precisely during these times when we must build up our storehouses for when times may not be as good. For that reason, I am particularly proud of this: in my budget, we are making the largest single contribution to our Rainy Day Fund in the state's history. When this budget is implemented, our Rainy Day Fund will be $1.1 billion – the largest it has ever been in both real dollars and as a percentage of our overall revenue."

During a governor's final address before leaving office, the speech is used to highlight the outgoing governor's achievements. Haslam in 2018 highlighted Tennessee's job growth rate, greater funding for K-12 education and teachers' salaries, tax and spending cuts, and a record high for high school graduation rates in Tennessee history, all achieved under his administration.

== Compensation ==
As of 2022, the governor's salary was set at $204,336 per year. This is the fourth highest U.S. gubernatorial salary. Bill Haslam and his predecessor, Phil Bredesen, both were independently wealthy before taking office and refused to accept state salaries for their service as governor.

== Line of succession ==
Tennessee does not elect a lieutenant governor. If a vacancy occurs in the office of governor due to the governor's death, removal, or resignation from office, the Tennessee Constitution provides for the Speaker of the Tennessee Senate to become governor. For this reason, the speaker is often referred to by the title "lieutenant governor", and was also granted this title by statute in 1951. Following the lieutenant governor/senate speaker in the line of succession are the speaker of the Tennessee House of Representatives, the secretary of state, and the comptroller.

In the event the governor's office becomes vacant during the first 18 months of his term, a special election for the balance of the term must be held at the time of the next federal general election. If the vacancy occurs after the first 18 months, whoever ascends to the governorship serves out the balance of the term. In either case, a partial term counts toward the limit of two consecutive terms.

Governor William Blount served from 1790 to 1796, when Tennessee was known as the Southwest Territory. He was replaced by John Sevier, the state's first governor. Other notable governors include Willie Blount (William's half-brother), Sam Houston (better known for his role as the President of the Republic of Texas), and future U.S. Presidents James K. Polk and Andrew Johnson

== Incumbent governor ==
Bill Lee, Republican, is the 50th governor of Tennessee, succeeding Bill Haslam in 2019. A former president of his company, the Lee Company, his primary focus so far has been job creation and the economy. In his budget proposal, Lee outlined plans for K-12 education, mental health, criminal justice, rural economic development and health care. Like Haslam, Lee also intends to add to the Rainy Day fund.

Lee's early executive orders included an order requiring all state executive departments to report rural impact and recommendations for improvement and three regarding ethics and transparency.

== History ==
=== Experience ===
Many recent governors have been businessmen. Phil Bredesen created the HealthCare America Corporation and Bill Haslam has held multiple chair and executive positions and is a co-owner of a minor league baseball team. Current governor Bill Lee was the president of his own company before taking office.

Education varies, but typically recent governors hold at least a bachelor's degree. Bredesen earned a degree in physics from Harvard, Haslam a bachelor's in history from Emory University, and Lee a bachelor's in mechanical engineering from Auburn University.

Though political experience is helpful for running for governor, it has never been a requirement. Bill Lee, for example, prior to his governorship never held office. Bredesen and Haslam were both mayors: Bredesen as mayor of Nashville from 1991 to 1999 and Haslam as mayor of Knoxville from 2003 to 2010. Early Tennessean politicians such as Andrew Jackson sometimes had a history of military service, with Jackson serving in the Revolutionary War and the War of 1812.

=== Famous governors ===
==== John Sevier ====
John Sevier was the first governor of Tennessee. He effectively founded the state and because it was new territory, he dealt with many issues that come along with founding a state. Though much of his work regards to his time in the frontier, his effects on Tennessean politics are still felt today. Biographer Carl S. Driver opined in 1932 that "Most of the evidence appears to lend weight to the fact that political sectionalism in Tennessee began with the break between Jackson and Sevier." Like his rival Andrew Jackson at the time, Sevier was a member of the Democratic-Republican Party.

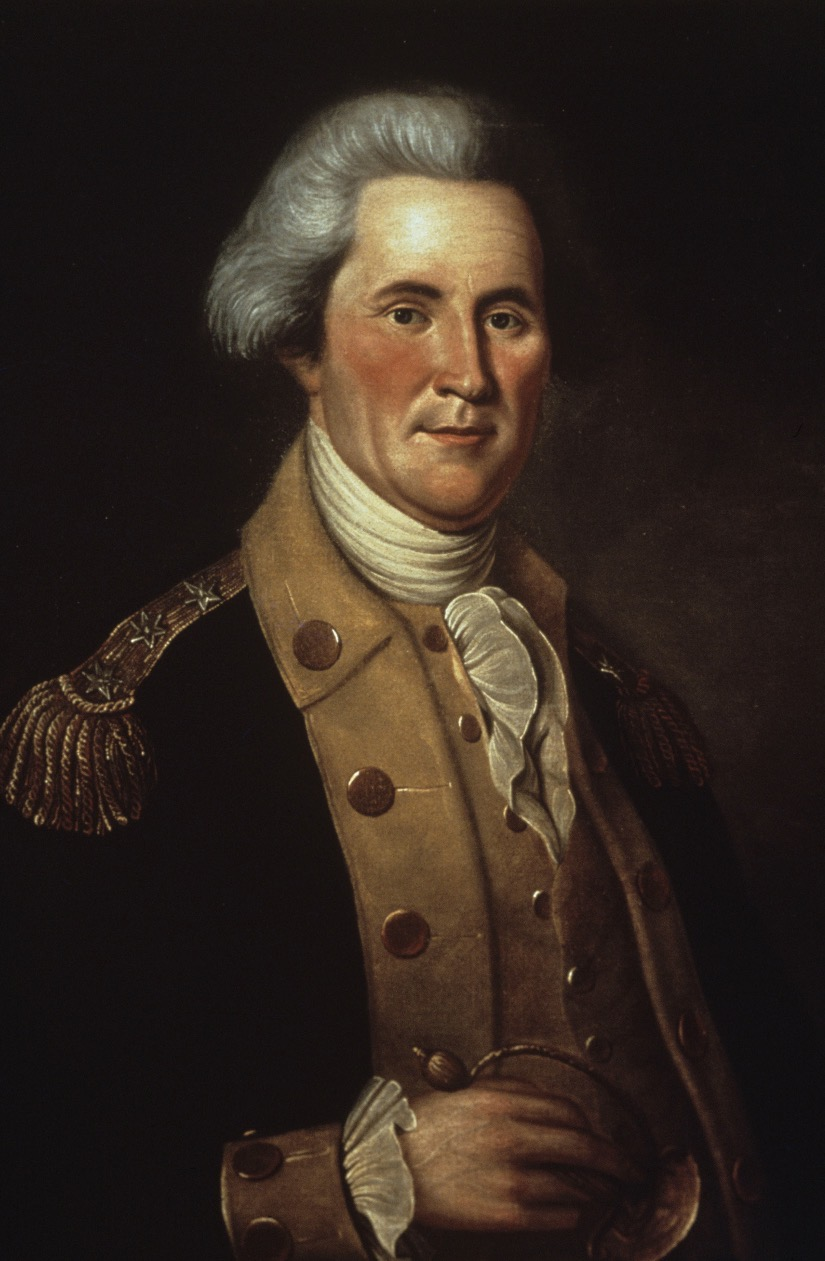
John Sevier, Tennessee's first governor

==== Sam Houston ====
Sam Houston represented Tennessee's 7th congressional district in the U.S. House of Representatives from March 4, 1823, to March 3, 1827, before being elected the 6th Governor of Tennessee, serving from October 1, 1827, to April 16, 1829. Following his Tennessee governorship, he moved west, first to the Arkansas Territory and then to what was at that time Mexican Texas. Following the Battle of Gonzales—which marked the beginning of the Texas Revolution in earnest—Houston took overall command of the Texian Army and led it to victory against Mexico. Houston was then elected as the first, and then the third, President of Texas. Houston assisted in the annexation of Texas by the United States, after which he represented Texas in the US Senate. He was later elected as 7th Governor of Texas, thus becoming the only person in history to serve as governor of two different US states. The city of Houston is named after him.

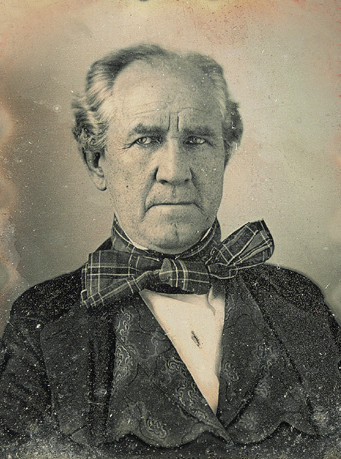
Former Governor Sam Houston

==== James K. Polk ====
James K. Polk, 11th President of the United States, was the governor of Tennessee from 1839 to 1841. He was a Democrat and a devout follower of Jacksonian democratic values. Dr. John Seigenthaler wrote in his biography of Polk that "To Polk, all politics was fiscal, deeply rooted in the early struggle between federalism and republicanism; Hamilton and Jefferson; the wealthy elite and the common man."

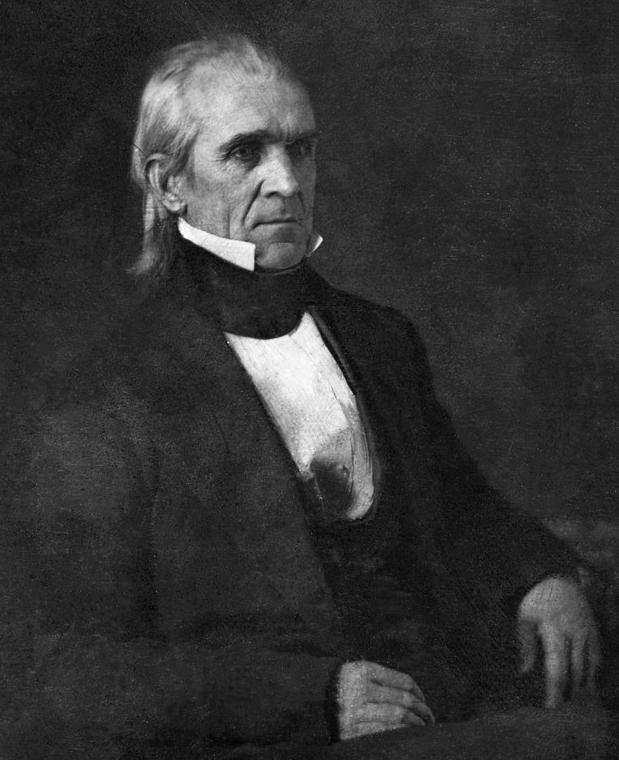
James K. Polk

==== Andrew Johnson ====
Andrew Johnson was the 17th President of the United States following Abraham Lincoln's assassination. A Democrat, he had joined Lincoln and the Republicans to form a National Union ticket in order to ensure the support of War Democrats in the 1864 United States presidential election. Johnson had previously been governor of Tennessee from 1853 to 1857. The Tennessean governor was not entitled to many powers at the time, but used the position to publicize his views.

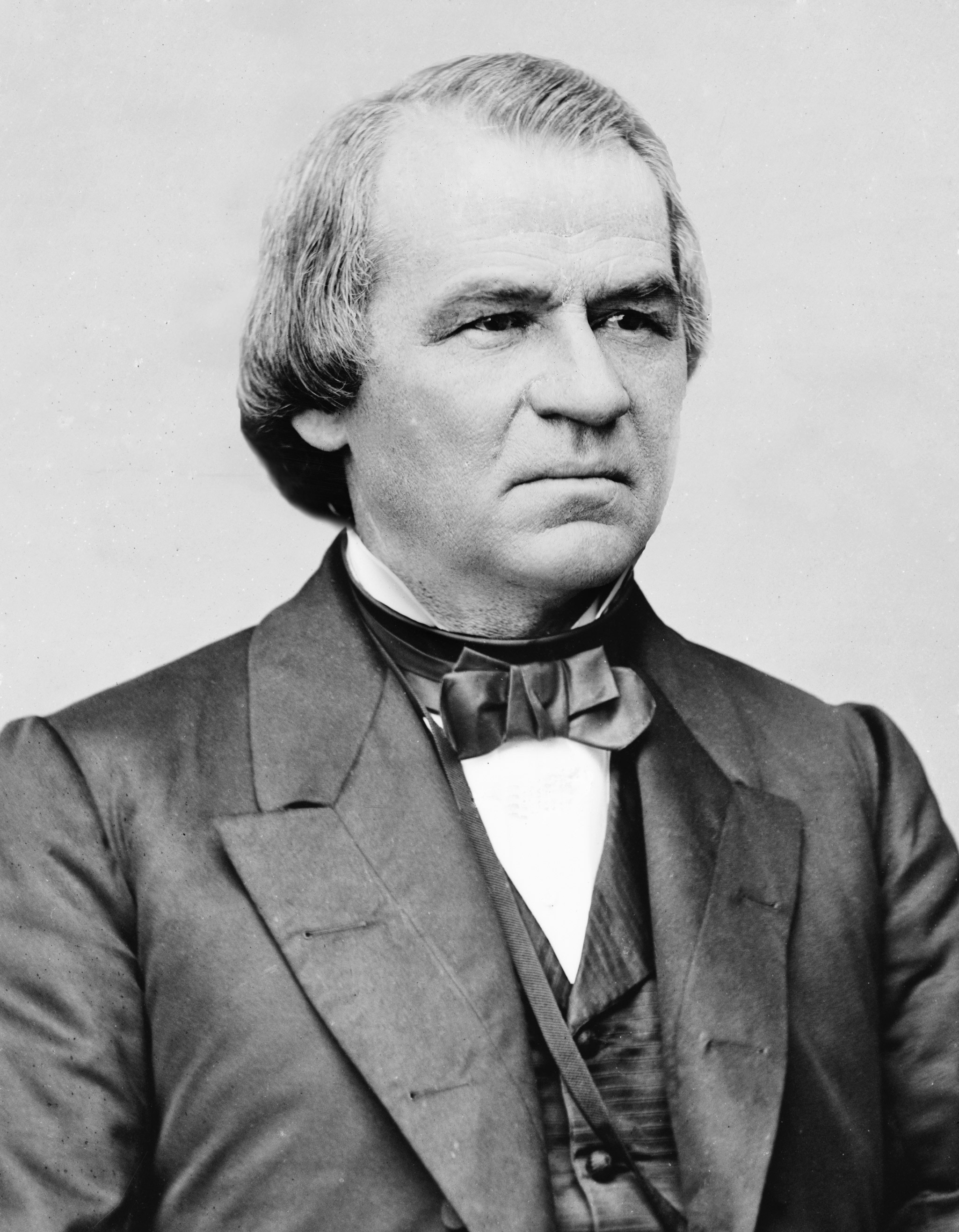
Andrew Johnson

==== Ray Blanton ====
Ray Blanton was governor from 1975 to 1979. He was forced from office days early by a "coup" led by his own party's leaders Speaker Ned McWherter and Lieutenant Governor John S. Wilder to inaugurate Lamar Alexander early and forestall additional potential pardons of a questionable nature.

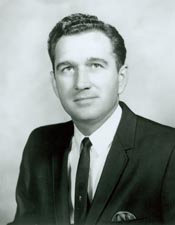
Former Governor Ray Blanton

==== Phil Bredesen ====
Phil Bredesen, Democrat, was governor from 2003 to 2011. In 2018, he ran for the US Senate against now senator Marsha Blackburn. He is also a former mayor of Nashville. Bredesen also proposed Cover Tennessee, a health care plan that would cost roughly $50 per person and would follow a person even if they changed employers. Cover Tennessee also includes Cover Kids which provides services to low-income pregnant women and children. These services include vaccinations, preventative care, vision, dental, mental health, physician services, physical and speech therapy, and hospitalization. He increased the Rainy Day fund, passed four balanced budgets, and expanded pre-K programs.

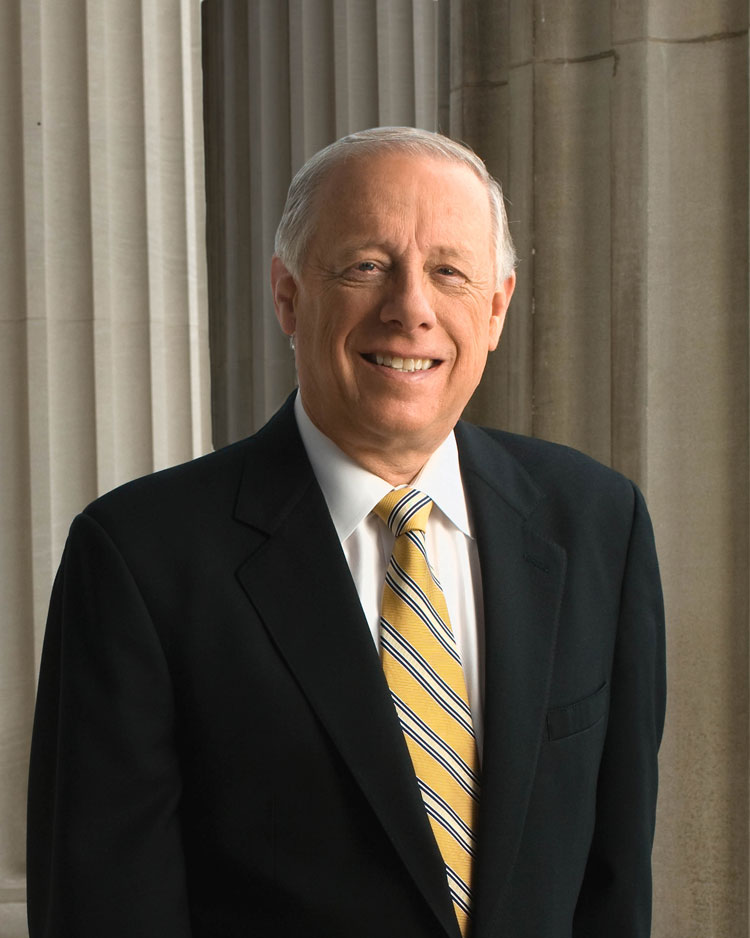
Former Governor Phil Bredesen

==== Bill Haslam ====
Bill Haslam, Republican, was governor from 2011 to 2019, succeeding Phil Bredesen. Because he took office during the Great Recession, he focused on economic recovery. He tightened the state's budgets, called for additional funds for Tennessee's rainy day fund, and worked on making Tennessee more business-friendly. However, his main legacy is in education. He is most well known for the TN Promise and Reconnect Programs, which allow students to attend a community college for two years with free tuition. This was done to make Tennessee more attractive to businesses and improve the workforce. Additionally, from 2017 to 2018, Haslam served as the chair of the Republican Governors' Association, working to elect Republicans in the 2018 gubernatorial elections.

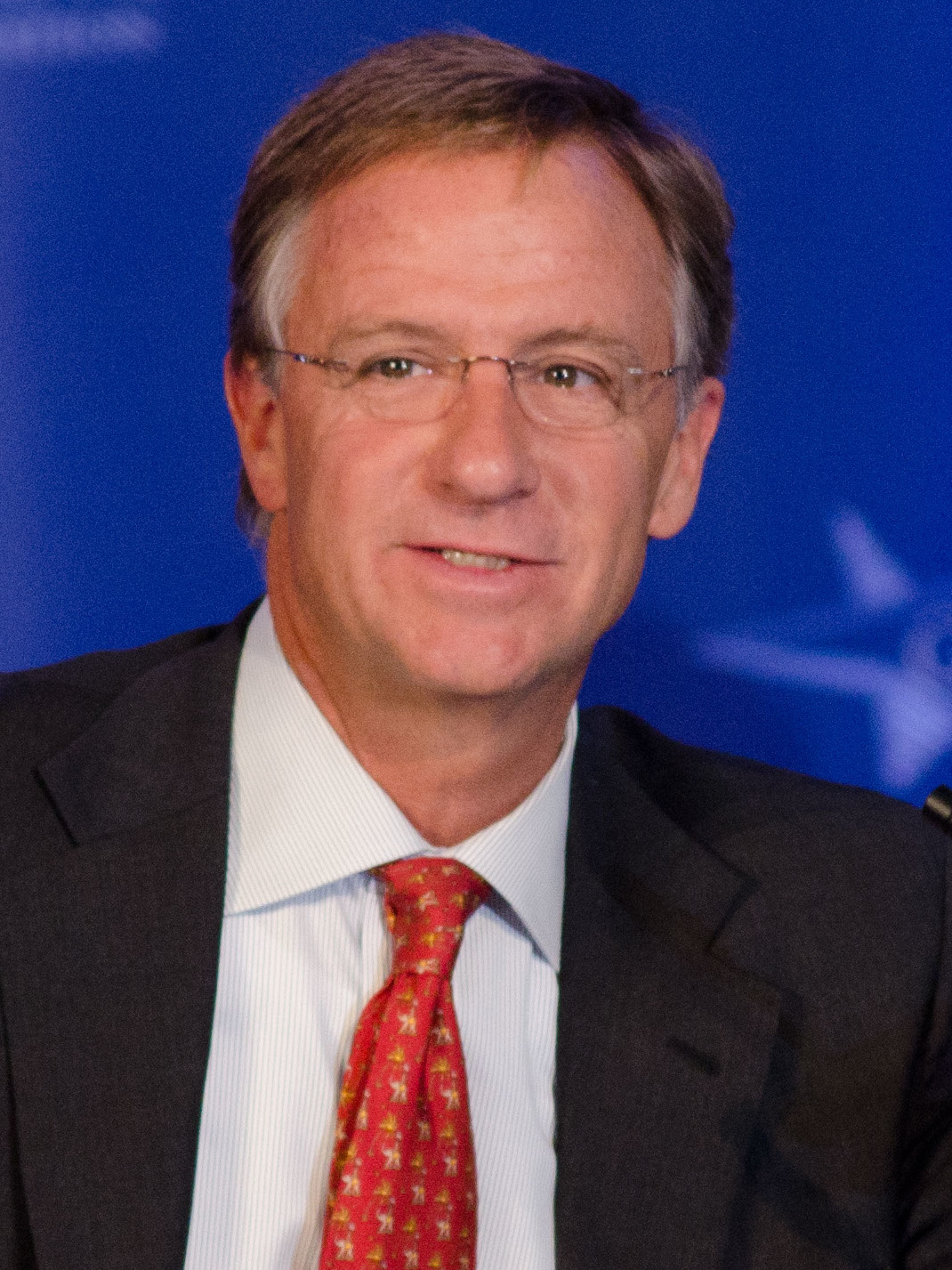
Former Governor Bill Haslam

== Recent priorities ==
In recent years there has been a heavy focus on the economy, health care, and education. Governors such as Haslam focused on making the state business friendly as much as possible, using fiscally conservative ideas when making policy. Conservatism has not been limited to Republicans however, as Phil Bredesen, a Democrat, supported the death penalty. There have been successful achievements that are not traditionally seen as conservative, namely TN Promise and Reconnect.

Bredesen's focuses included healthcare. He announced Cover Tennessee in 2006 as "a partnership between the state and small business to help adults buy affordable insurance that follows them, no matter where they work, and that doesn't require high deductibles on the front end." Cover Tennessee would follow a citizen regardless if they changed employers and Cover Kids provides services to pregnant women and children in low-income families. His handling of TennCare, namely that he cut more than 170,000 people from the rolls for the sake of the budget, was criticized, and it played a role in his Senate race in 2018.

Tennessee governors have a history of going back and forth between democrats and republicans, though the former Democratic stronghold is now solidly Republican.

== Achievements ==
Tennessee governors' achievements generally have varied with the priorities of the administration. Since governor Haslam, much emphasis has been placed on education and increasing the number of students enrolling in technical and community colleges. Bill Lee has continued this priority by proposing a budget to increase funding for school safety and resource officers. Democratic and Republican administrations alike have carried the belief that a well balanced budget should always be paramount when shaping policy in Tennessee.

Governor Sundquist served from 1995 to 2003. In 1996 Sundquist focused heavily on ethics and welfare reforms and played a role in the creation of the Tennessee Regulatory Authority and the Families First Act. Replacing the previous Public Service Commission, the Families First Act dropped the number of welfare recipients from 70,000 to 30,000 in an effort to reduce state expenditures. Sundquist also created the Department of Children's Services in 1996. In his second term Sundquist created the ConnectTn program which made Tennessee the first state in the country to provide internet use in public libraries and schools. Sundquist is most known for his push for a state income tax, which received wide backlash from Democrats and Republicans. His effort of tax reform was destroyed by future governor Phil Bredesen.

Phil Bredesen campaigned to reduce waste in state government, reform TennCare, and improve Tennessee schools. In 2004, Bredesen enacted TennCare reform, cutting the budget by more than half and removing nearly 200,000 citizens from being eligible for Medicaid. Bredesen increased funding for education by $366.5 million focusing on Pre-K incentives and increasing teacher pay. In 2006 Bredesen created Cover Tennessee protecting Tennesseans with preexisting conditions and expanding care to uninsured children. In 2007, Bredesen pushed for another increase to education funding by issuing a cigarette tax, the increase would amount to $343 million for education.

The Haslam administration focused heavily on improving the economy and education in Tennessee. In 2012 Haslam signed a budget to increase construction spending by $560 million and eliminate the inheritance and gift tax. The bill also included a plan called "Fast Track", which aimed to provide incentives for companies to move to Tennessee. Haslam's most well-known accomplishment is the Tennessee Promise and Reconnect programs. Tennessee Promise gives Tennesseans the opportunity of two free years of community college or technical school. The Reconnect program provides incentives for adults to return for post-secondary degrees. In 2012, Haslam introduced the T.E.A.M. Act in an attempt to improve state employee performance. The bill would change hiring and advancements policy to prioritize job performance over seniority. In 2017, Haslam introduced the IMPROVE Act which aimed to provide funding for $10 billion of needed road construction. The act cut food sales taxes, but raised taxes on gas, diesel, and natural gas. The bill also created an annual $100 fee for electric car owners and increased all vehicle registration fees.

== Timeline ==
Timeline of Tennessee governors

== See also ==
- Lieutenant Governor of Tennessee
- Tennessee Secretary of State
- Comptroller of the Treasury of Tennessee
- Government of Tennessee
- Political party strength in Tennessee
- Elections in Tennessee
