= Hartsville, Tennessee =

- Consolidated city-county
- Hartsville-Trousdale County
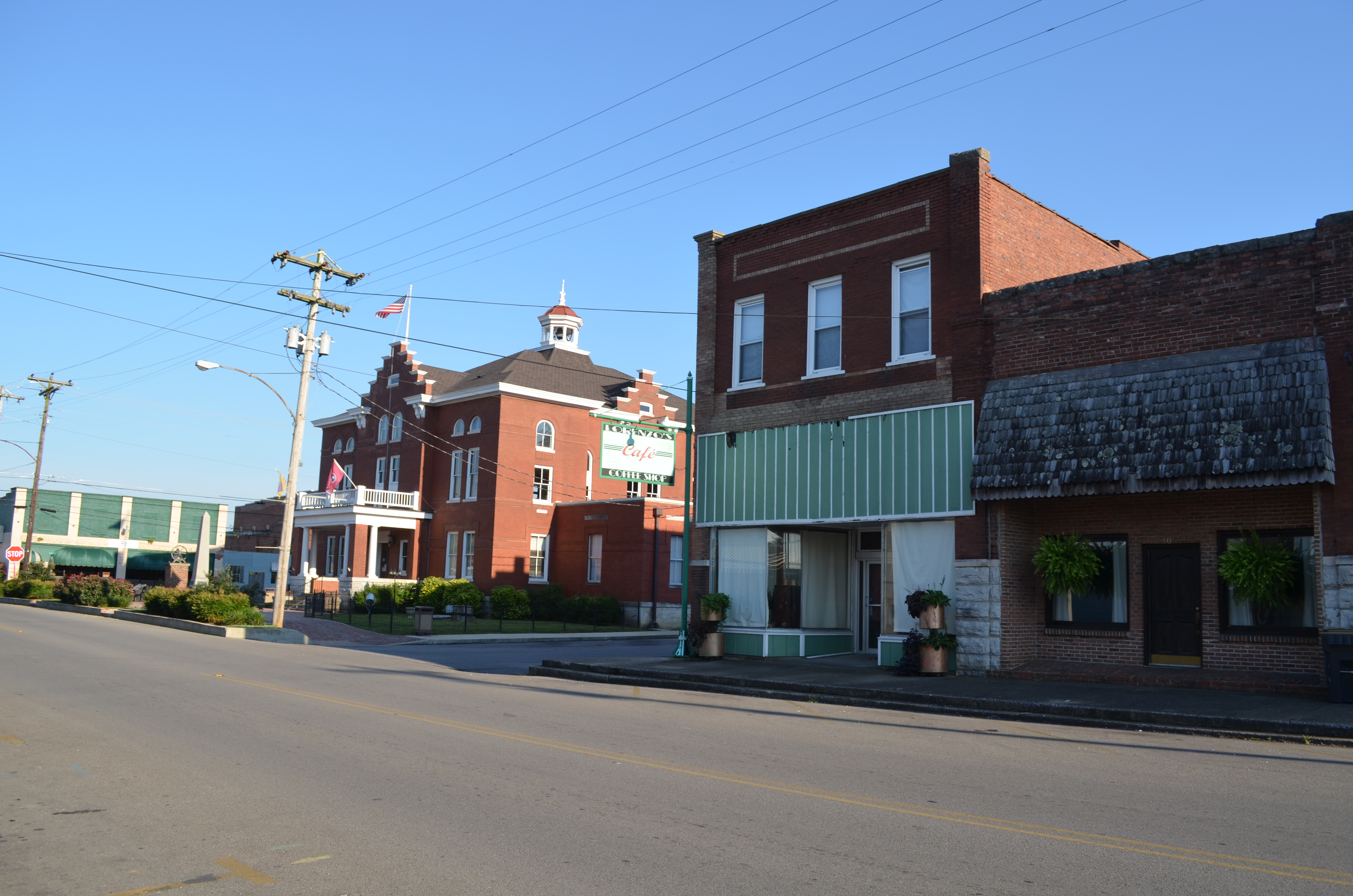
- Downtown Hartsville

- Location within Tennessee Location within the United States
- Coordinates: 36°23′30″N 86°9′37″W
- Country: United States
- State: Tennessee
- County: Trousdale
- Settled: 1785
- Founded: 1817
- Incorporated: 1840
- Founder: James Hart, early settler

Area
  - Total: 3.6 sq mi (9.2 km^{2})
  - Land: 3.6 sq mi (9.2 km^{2})
  - Water: 0 sq mi (0.0 km^{2})
- Elevation: 472 ft (144 m)

Population (2020)
  - Total: 11,615
  - Density: 674/sq mi (260.1/km^{2})
- Time zone: UTC−06:00 (Central (CST))
  - Summer (DST): UTC−05:00 (CDT)
- ZIP code: 37074
- Area code: 615
- FIPS code: 47-32720
- GNIS feature ID: 1287064
- Website: www.trousdalecountytn.gov

Hartsville is a town in Trousdale County, Tennessee, United States. It is the county seat of Trousdale County, with which it shares a consolidated city-county government. The population of Hartsville was 11,615 as of 2020.

Hartsville now shares with Trousdale County a consolidated city-county government by virtue of a referendum which passed in Trousdale County in 2000. Despite the city-county government, under Tennessee law, Hartsville is also considered to be a distinct municipality. Trousdale County High School is located here, as well a Tennessee Colleges of Applied Technology campus operated by the Tennessee Board of Regents. Trousdale County is one of two counties in Tennessee to have legalized parimutuel betting on horse racing, but no group has ever stepped forward to build a racetrack. Hartsville is located slightly north of the Cumberland River and is approximately fifty miles northeast of Nashville.

In 1977, the Tennessee Valley Authority began construction on the Hartsville Nuclear Plant, but cancelled the project in 1984 after spending nearly $2 billion. The plant's unused cooling tower dominated the view south from State Route 25 between Smith County and Trousdale County until it was imploded in 2025. In 2016, Corrections Corporation of America (since renamed CoreCivic) opened the Trousdale Turner Correctional Center, a medium-security prison, in Hartsville. The prison became a hot spot for COVID-19 cases in the COVID-19 pandemic, giving the county the highest incidence rate in the U.S. in May 2020, with 1 in 7 residents known to be infected with coronavirus.

== History ==
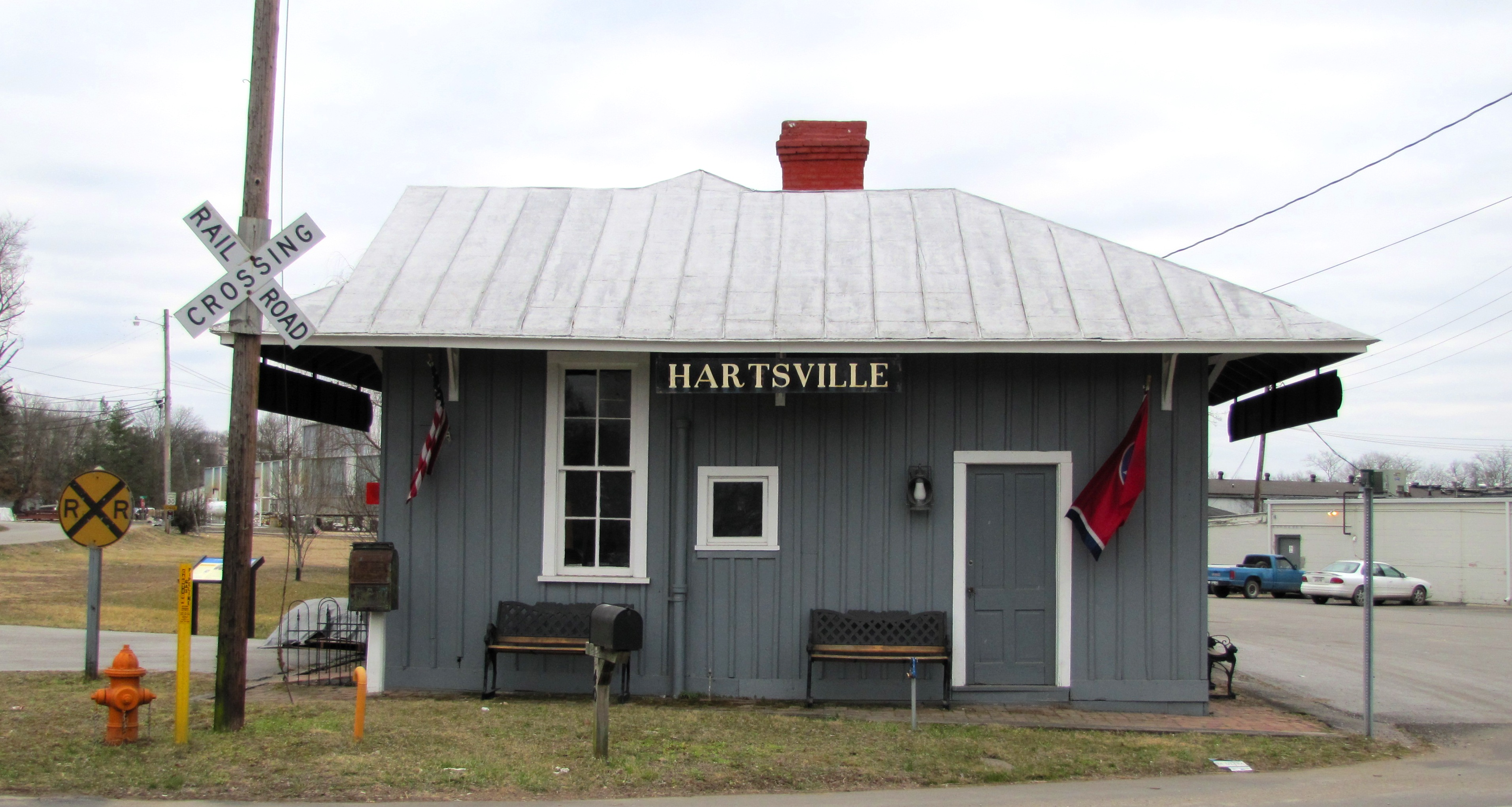
Old Hartsville Depot

The first Euro-Americans to explore the area were long hunters. Some hunters found the creek breaking off from the Cumberland River was plentiful of geese, (in which was named, Goose Creek) After the War for Independence was over, and the United States was in its infancy, settlers, mainly other veterans, moved to claim their land grants from the new government. 4,800 acres of what now encompasses Hartsville was originally granted to Major Thomas Donoho, a veteran of the American Revolution. This grant was made when the area was Davidson County, North Carolina, and was surveyed by James Saunders, yet, Thomas never moved, he sold his land off in chunks to other veterans and his family. Men such as; Henry Turney, Tilman Dixon, William Lauderdale, Richard Britton, Thomas Stubblefield, Charles Donoho (One of the founders of Gallatin, 1802), David Mugle, and William Stalcup are just some of the early pioneers who moved in the late 18th century. James Hart settled along the West bank of Goose Creek in 1797, purchasing land from Donoho. Hart operated a ferry service on the Cumberland River and acquired his wealth from said business. Hart and his family started purchasing more land on the Goose creek; he began a distillery in 1797, purchased Charles Donoho’s mill on the east fork of the creek in 1801, established a race track where Trey Park is today, and used his plantation as an post office starting in 1812.

Article in the Clarion newspaper, mentions Hartsville by name. (January 1809)

Hartsville grew immensely between 1808-1816 as businesses and trade started to be more established. The community was officially recognized in 1817, and began to sell lots the next year. The east bank of the creek had become known as "Damascus" during the 1820-30s, although it merged with Hartsville in 1840 when Hartsville officially incorporated.

During the Civil War, Hartsville was site of the Battle of Hartsville, which took place in 1862.

Julie Hayden, a 17-year old Black school teacher, was murdered by the white supremacist organization the White Man's League in 1874 in Hartsville.

Trousdale County is noted for having the 4th most TSSAA high school football championships, behind Alcoa, Maryville, and Brentwood Academy. Trousdale County High School won state championships in 1972, 1990, 1993, 1997, 1998, 2005, 2008, 2009, and 2013, and was runner-up in 1973, 1974, 1975, and 2018.

== Education ==
Trousdale County is serviced by three public schools: Trousdale County High School, Trousdale County Elementary School, and Jim B. Satterfield Middle School. In October 2013, Trousdale County school district was awarded the State Collaborative on Reforming Education, or SCORE, Prize winner for the school district that has most dramatically improved student achievement. Trousdale County "serves more than 1,200 students and has significantly narrowed the achievement gap in science between white students and African-American and Hispanic students. It also has shown notable growth on TVAAS in math and Biology I."

== Geography ==
Hartsville is located at 36°23′30″N 86°9′37″W (36.391617, -86.160172). The town's business district is situated along the West Fork of Goose Creek, which flows into Trousdale County from the hills to the north and empties into the Old Hickory Lake impoundment of the Cumberland River several miles to the south. A large hill rises immediately to the west of the business district and overlooks the entire eastern half of the county.

Hartsville lies at the junction of State Route 25, which connects the town with Carthage to the southeast and Sumner County to the west, and State Route 141, which connects Hartsville with Lebanon to the south and Macon County to the north.

According to the United States Census Bureau, the town has a total area of 3.6 square miles (9.3 km^{2}) in 2000, all land.

=== Climate ===
Climate data for Hartsville, Tennessee, 1991–2020 normals, extremes 1998–2015
| Month | Jan | Feb | Mar | Apr | May | Jun | Jul | Aug | Sep | Oct | Nov | Dec | Year |
|---|---|---|---|---|---|---|---|---|---|---|---|---|---|
| Record high °F (°C) | 77 (25) | 77 (25) | 85 (29) | 89 (32) | 93 (34) | 98 (37) | 101 (38) | 105 (41) | 100 (38) | 92 (33) | 83 (28) | 78 (26) | 105 (41) |
| Mean daily maximum °F (°C) | 47.8 (8.8) | 51.7 (10.9) | 60.4 (15.8) | 70.5 (21.4) | 78.2 (25.7) | 84.9 (29.4) | 88.2 (31.2) | 88.2 (31.2) | 82.8 (28.2) | 72.1 (22.3) | 60.3 (15.7) | 50.2 (10.1) | 69.6 (20.9) |
| Daily mean °F (°C) | 37.1 (2.8) | 40.8 (4.9) | 48.3 (9.1) | 57.6 (14.2) | 65.9 (18.8) | 73.3 (22.9) | 77.0 (25.0) | 76.4 (24.7) | 70.7 (21.5) | 58.9 (14.9) | 48.2 (9.0) | 40.3 (4.6) | 57.9 (14.4) |
| Mean daily minimum °F (°C) | 26.5 (−3.1) | 29.8 (−1.2) | 36.1 (2.3) | 44.6 (7.0) | 53.6 (12.0) | 61.8 (16.6) | 65.8 (18.8) | 64.5 (18.1) | 58.6 (14.8) | 45.7 (7.6) | 36.1 (2.3) | 30.5 (−0.8) | 46.1 (7.9) |
| Record low °F (°C) | −6 (−21) | −7 (−22) | 9 (−13) | 21 (−6) | 29 (−2) | 43 (6) | 48 (9) | 48 (9) | 35 (2) | 26 (−3) | 15 (−9) | 7 (−14) | −7 (−22) |
| Average precipitation inches (mm) | 4.15 (105) | 4.49 (114) | 4.55 (116) | 4.39 (112) | 5.99 (152) | 4.43 (113) | 4.52 (115) | 3.71 (94) | 3.93 (100) | 3.50 (89) | 4.61 (117) | 4.90 (124) | 53.17 (1,351) |
Source 1: NOAA (precipitation 1981–2010)
Source 2: XMACIS2

== Demographics ==
Historical population
| Census | Pop. | Note | %± |
|---|---|---|---|
| 1920 | 1,023 | | — |
| 1930 | 1,015 | | −0.8% |
| 1940 | 1,095 | | 7.9% |
| 1950 | 1,130 | | 3.2% |
| 1960 | 1,712 | | 51.5% |
| 1970 | 2,243 | | 31.0% |
| 1980 | 2,674 | | 19.2% |
| 1990 | 2,188 | | −18.2% |
| 2000 | 2,395 | | 9.5% |
| 2010 | 7,870 | | 228.6% |
| 2020 | 11,615 | | 47.6% |
| 2025 (est.) | 12,623 | ▲ | 8.7% |

As of the census of 2000, there were 2,395 people, 938 households, and 601 families residing in the town. The population density was 673.5 inhabitants per square mile (260.0/km^{2}). There were 1,043 housing units at an average density of 293.3 units per square mile (113.2 units/km^{2}). The racial makeup of the town was 75.70% White, 22.46% African American, 0.29% Native American, 0.21% Asian, 0.04% Pacific Islander, 0.84% from other races, and 0.46% from two or more races. Hispanic or Latino of any race were 1.46% of the population.

There were 938 households, out of which 29.1% had children under the age of 18 living with them, 42.2% were married couples living together, 18.9% had a female householder with no husband present, and 35.9% were non-families. 31.2% of all households were made up of individuals, and 13.8% had someone living alone who was 65 years of age or older. The average household size was 2.38 and the average family size was 2.96.

In the town, the population was spread out, with 23.3% under the age of 18, 8.9% from 18 to 24, 26.1% from 25 to 44, 22.5% from 45 to 64, and 19.1% who were 65 years of age or older. The median age was 39 years. For every 100 females, there were 87.4 males. For every 100 females age 18 and over, there were 81.2 males.

The median income for a household in the town was $26,797, and the median income for a family was $33,523. Males had a median income of $27,232 versus $21,429 for females. The per capita income for the town was $14,226. About 17.0% of families and 19.7% of the population were below the poverty line, including 21.0% of those under age 18 and 24.3% of those age 65 or over.

== Notable people ==
- Bob Dyer, radio and television host.
- William Lauderdale, planter and soldier who fought in the War of 1812 and Second Seminole War.
- John Martin, lawyer and politician from Hartsville, Tennessee. Martin represented Kansas in the United States Senate from 1893 until 1895.

== Government ==
The legislative authority of the Hartsville/Trousdale County Government shall include all legislative authority vested in the former Town of Hartsville and in Trousdale County upon the date of the formation of the Hartsville/Trousdale County Government, as well as all legislative powers vested in metropolitan governments generally, in county governments generally under the Constitution of the State of Tennessee, under laws of general application of the State of Tennessee as the same shall be in effect at or after the date of formation of the Hartsville/Trousdale County Government, or under any private acts applicable to the Town of Hartsville or Trousdale County. The legislative authority of the Hartsville/Trousdale County Government except as otherwise specified in this charter, shall be vested in the Hartsville/Trousdale County Commission, sometimes hereinafter called "Commission."

The commission is divided into 10 districts with 2 commissioners per district. The next election cycle for the commission is 2026.

Current Trousdale County Commission
| District | Commissioner | Commissioner |
|---|---|---|
| 1st | Mark Presley | David Nollner |
| 2nd | Shane Burton | Landon Gulley |
| 3rd | Jerry Ford | Grant Cothron |
| 4th | Lonnie Taylor | Terry "Bubba" Gregory |
| 5th | Lesley Overman | Will Dennis |
| 6th | Alan Carman | Amber Russell |
| 7th | Judy Kerr | Chris Gregory |
| 8th | Brian Cook | Steve Whittaker |
| 9th | Richard B. Johnson | David Thomas |
| 10th | Beverly Atwood | Tommy Belcher |
