= TennCare =

Tennessee Medicaid program

TennCare is the state Medicaid program in the U.S. state of Tennessee. TennCare was established in 1994 under a federal waiver that authorized deviations from the standard Medicaid rules. It was the first state Medicaid program to enroll all Medicaid recipients in managed care. When first implemented, it also offered health insurance to other residents who did not have other insurance. Over time, the non-Medicaid component of the program was significantly reduced. Today TennCare offers a large variety of programs to better serve the citizens of Tennessee.

== History ==
TennCare was started in the early 1990s under Governor Ned McWherter as a health care reform initiative that had the twin goals of controlling rising Medicaid costs and increasing public access to affordable health care. Tennessee sought and obtained waivers from the federal Health Care Financing Administration that allowed the state to conduct a five-year demonstration program. Plans called for eliminating the Medicaid fee-for-service payment method by instead enrolling the state's Medicaid recipients in managed care programs administered by private-sector organizations. Additionally, other state residents who lacked healthcare coverage, particularly those who could not obtain medical insurance because of pre-existing medical conditions, could pay sliding-scale premiums to enroll in the same programs; the cost of their coverage would be subsidized by savings from the Medicaid program. The waiver that Tennessee received was one of the nation's first Medicaid waivers, with the overarching requirement that the program be "budget neutral", or require no greater federal funding than the previous Medicaid program.

The program was launched January 1, 1994. The state contracted with 12 statewide managed-care organizations that were established to implement the program through a competitive bid process. The state shifted more than 800,000 individuals from standard Medicaid coverage to coverage through a managed care company, and extended program benefits to 500,000 more people who were not Medicaid-eligible, but were uninsured or deemed uninsurable due to pre-existing conditions.

In its first year of operation, TennCare enrollment quickly grew, leading to concern that it would exceed the number for which the federal government would share cost. In 1995, after enrollment reached 1.2 million, the state closed eligibility to uninsured adults. People who were deemed uninsurable due to pre-existing health conditions were still eligible to enroll.

In 1996, the state separated behavioral health services from the basic managed-care program, contracting with a separate set of behavioral health organizations for mental health and substance abuse services to TennCare participants.

The initial five-year Medicaid waiver was eventually extended through July 1, 2002, when it was replaced by a new program waiver called "TennCare II" that was extended until June 30, 2010.

Under TennCare II, program eligibility for "uninsured" and "uninsurables" was tightened. New applicants in the "uninsurable" category (now called "medically eligible") were required to have an income below a specified threshold and their ineligibility for standard insurance was required to be verified through a medical underwriting process.

The total annual budget for TennCare increased from $2.64 billion in 1994 to more than $8.5 billion in fiscal year 2005, with essentially no change in the number of participants enrolled. After becoming governor in 2003, Phil Bredesen hired the consulting firm McKinsey & Company to evaluate the financial sustainability of TennCare and make recommendations for future actions. The McKinsey report, issued in late 2003 and privately funded by Blue Cross Blue Shield and Tennessee-based HCA, concluded that TennCare was not financially viable. A follow-up report in January 2004 identified options that ranged from returning to the original Medicaid program to setting limits on enrollment and benefits. In response to these reports and to stem the growth in costs, in 2005 the state implemented several program changes, including removing about 190,000 participants, imposing limits on the number of prescription medications each participant could receive, and reducing some other benefits.

== Services ==
TennCare offers a variety of services for its members. A full list of these services can be found at https://www.tn.gov/tenncare.html.

Some of the most commonly used services are TennCare for kids, long-term care for seniors, pharmacy benefits, COVID-19 testing, and Opioid strategy. There are other services offered but these are among the most common services.

== TennCare Connect ==
In 2012, TennCare hired Northrup Grumman to build a computer system called the Tennessee Eligibility Determination System (TEDS), which would be used to determine eligibility for TennCare, but the company was fired after it failed to complete the job. In 2016, Deloitte Consulting was hired to finish the work, which was completed at a total cost of $400 million in 2019, when the new system was launched under the name TennCare Connect.

In 2020, a class action lawsuit was filed on behalf of 35 adults and children in Tennessee, who alleged that they were illegally denied Medicaid and other benefits by the TennCare Connect system. In August 2024, US District Court Judge Waverly Crenshaw Jr. ruled in the plaintiffs' favor, finding that the algorithmic system built by Deloitte and other contractors failed to load appropriate data, assigned beneficiaries to the wrong households, and made incorrect eligibility determinations.
