= South Central Correctional Facility =

Prison in Clifton, Wayne County, Tennessee

Coordinates: 35°21′56″N 87°59′49″W

- Interactive map of South Central Correctional Facility
- Location: 555 Forrest Avenue Clifton, Tennessee
- Status: open
- Security class: medium
- Capacity: 1,676
- Opened: 1992
- Managed by: CoreCivic

not to be confused with the South Central Correctional Center, Missouri

South Central Correctional Facility is a privately run, medium-security prison located in Clifton, Wayne County, Tennessee. This prison is operated and administered by CoreCivic (formerly Corrections Corporation of America) under contract to the Tennessee Department of Correction.

As of 2016, Tennessee houses state inmates in four CoreCivic prisons. The state's Private Prison Contracting Act of 1986, however, authorizes a single private prison for state inmates.

As of 2016 Tennessee technically contracts directly with CoreCivic only for inmates held at South Central. For the three other facilities, the state circumvents its statute by contracting with the local county. In turn the county signs an agreement with CoreCivic.

== Incidents at SCCF ==
In 1997, a prisoner sued two prison guards, alleging he had been subject to "very tight physical restraints." The suit went to the Supreme Court of the United States as Richardson v. McKnight.

On September 1, 2013, inmate Gerald Ewing was killed in a fight after three days of lockdowns and sporadic, simultaneous fights at the facility. On March 28, 2014, inmate Jeffery Sills was brutally murdered by his cell mate, who had openly promised to do so.

== Notable inmates ==
- Alejandro Guana - Convicted of first-degree murder in the 2007 murder of Tennessee State Trooper Calvin Jenks. He was sentenced to life in prison with the possibility of parole.
