= Northwest Correctional Complex =

Prison in Tennessee, United States

Coordinates: 36°24′56″N 89°27′12″W

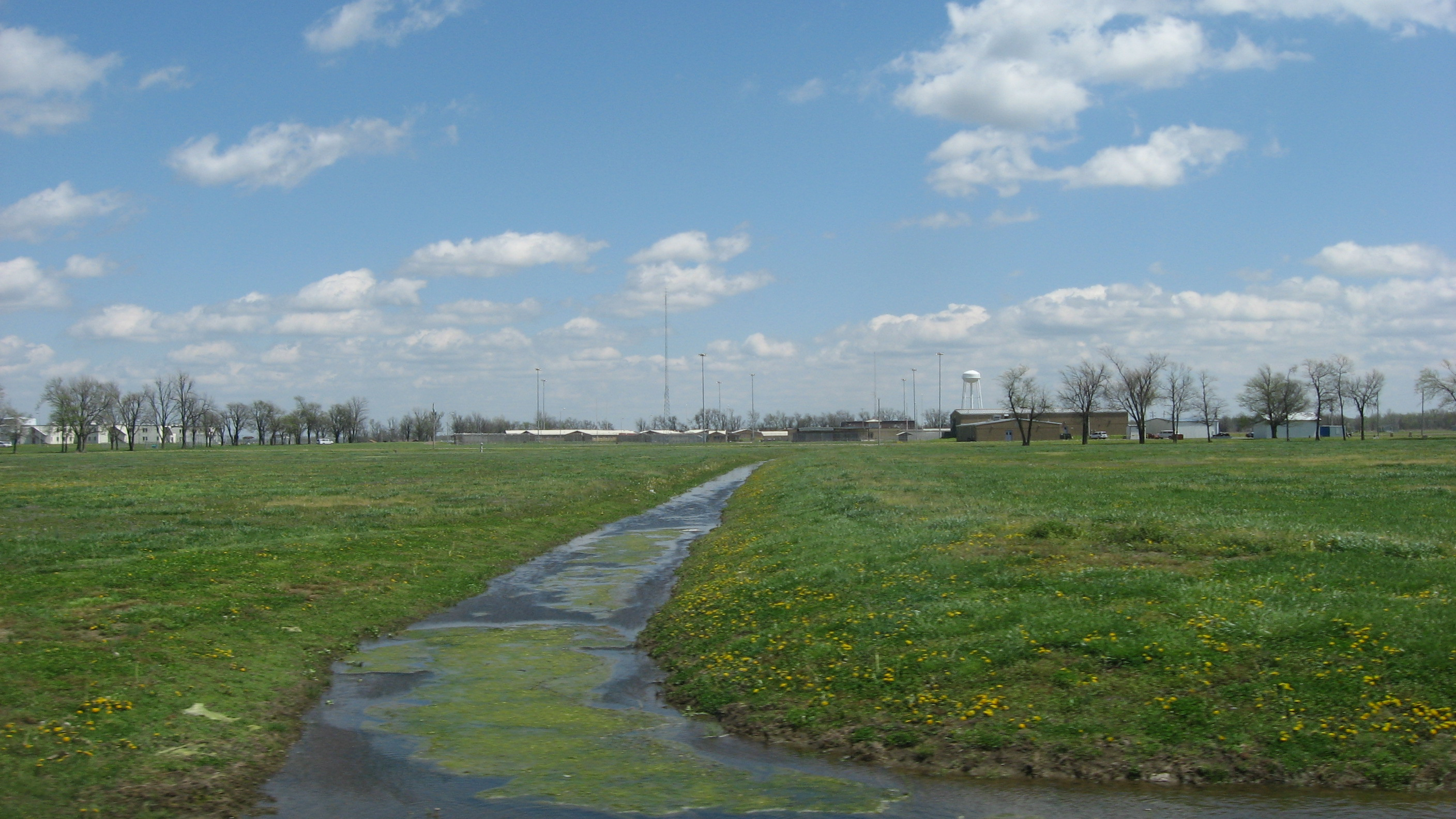
- Interactive map of Northwest Correctional Complex
- Location: 960 TN-212 Tiptonville, Tennessee
- Status: Open
- Security class: Close
- Capacity: 1,776
- Opened: 1981
- Managed by: Tennessee Department of Correction
- Director: Henry Holiday

The Northwest Correctional Complex (NWCX) is a state prison located in Tiptonville, Lake County, Tennessee. It is owned and operated by the Tennessee Department of Correction. The facility can hold 1,776 male inmates at security levels from minimum to close. It has the second largest capacity of any state prison in Tennessee after the Trousdale Turner Correctional Center. It is the primary educational prison in the state system. In addition, inmates provide more than 100,000 hours of community service to state and local governments, and non-profit agencies annually.

== History ==
The Lake County Regional Correctional Facility (now called Site 2 within the complex) opened in Tiptonville in 1981, with a capacity of 500 inmates. The Northwest Corrections Center opened on the site in 1992 and is called Site 1.

In July 2015, eight NWCX inmates sustained knife wounds in gang-related stabbings. The prison, as well as the state's Northeast Correctional Complex, was put on lockdown. The disturbances were attributed by The Tennessean to understaffing and a "severe manpower shortage" following Tennessee's decision to reconfigure correctional officers' schedules to save money on overtime.

In May 2020, 394 cases of COVID-19 were linked to NWCX. Specifically, 381 inmates and 13 staff at the prison tested positive for the disease as of May that year. By June, a total of 612 inmates and 28 staff members had tested positive; 382 of those inmates quickly recovered and 10 staff members returned to work.

On October 25, 2026, an inmate named Jacob Morley escaped from NWCX, but was captured a week later in Missouri. Morley had been serving a life sentence for murdering Cody Birchfield in 2022.

== Notable inmates ==
Inmate name	Register number	Status	Details
Letalvis Cobbins	00459699	Serving a life sentence without parole.	Convicted of the 2007 kidnapping, rape, and murders of Channon Christian and Christopher Newsom.
George Geovonni Thomas	00464319	Serving a sentence of 50 years. Eligible for parole in 2053.	Also convicted of the previously mentioned 2007 kidnapping, rape, and murders of Channon Christian and Christopher Newsom.
William Riley Gaul	00593432	Serving a life sentence. Eligible for parole in 2069.	Perpetrator of the 2016 stalking and murder of Emma Jane Walker, his ex-girlfriend.
Jim Adkisson	00450456	Serving two life sentences without the possibility of parole.	Perpetrator of the 2008 Knoxville Unitarian Universalist church shooting, in which he murdered two people and injured six others.
Joel Michael Guy, Jr.	00624102	Serving a life sentence.	Convicted of the 2016 murders of Joel and Lisa Guy, his parents.
