= Federal Correctional Institution, Beckley =

Federal prison in West Virginia, United States

Coordinates: 37°49′0.8″N 81°7′45.9″W

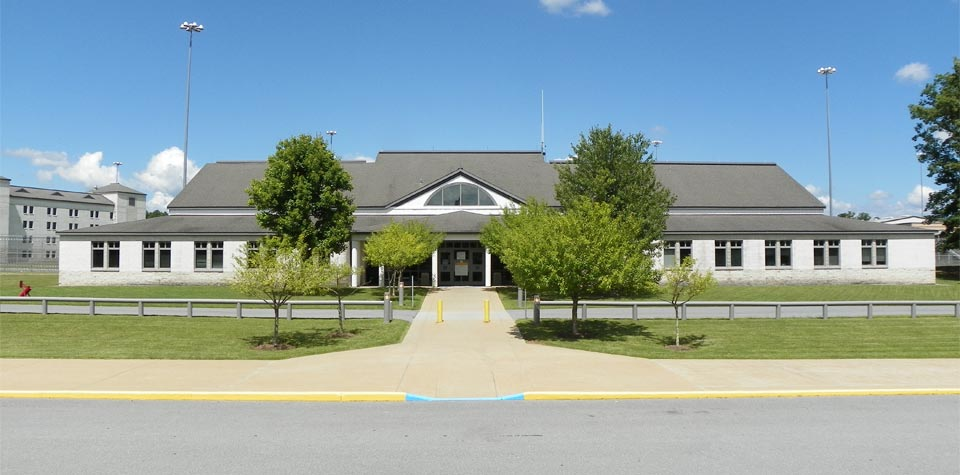
- Interactive map of Federal Correctional Institution, Beckley
- Location: Raleigh County, near Beaver, West Virginia
- Status: Operational
- Security class: Medium-security (with minimum-security prison camp)
- Population: 1,660 (430 in prison camp)
- Opened: 1994
- Managed by: Federal Bureau of Prisons

The Federal Correctional Institution, Beckley (FCI Beckley) is a medium-security United States federal prison for male inmates in West Virginia. It is operated by the Federal Bureau of Prisons, a division of the United States Department of Justice. An adjacent satellite camp houses minimum-security inmates.

FCI Beckley is located approximately 51 miles southeast of Charleston, West Virginia and 136 miles northwest of Roanoke, Virginia.

== Notable incidents ==
While they occur less frequently than at high-security prisons, serious acts of violence also occur at medium and minimum-security institutions such as FCI Beckley. In April 2010, FCI Beckley inmate Sylvester Cuevas, who was serving a sentence for mailing threatening communications, repeatedly punched a correction officer, causing the officer to sustain a broken nose and facial cuts. Cuevas was charged with felony assault and transferred to the Southern Regional Jail in Raleigh County, West Virginia pending court proceedings. Cuevas assaulted another correction officer at that facility in August 2010, who suffered a broken facial bone. On February 2, 2012, Cuevas pleaded guilty to felony assault in connection with both incidents and was sentenced to an additional eight years in prison. Cuevas was transferred to ADX Florence, the federal supermax prison in Colorado which holds inmates requiring the tightest security controls. He has since been moved to USP Atlanta.

== Notable inmates (current and former) ==
	Register Number	Photo	Status	Details
Eric DeWayne Boyd	31710-074		Served an 18-year sentence; released in June 2022. He was sentenced to life in prison in 2019.	Convicted for assisting Lemaricus Davidson, perpetrator of the 2007 murders of Channon Christian and Christopher Newsom, carjack a vehicle in order to elude authorities.
James Kopp	11761-055		Serving a life sentence, currently at FCI Mendota.	Associate of the anti-abortion group The Lambs of Christ; convicted in 2007 of the 1998 murder of Dr. Barnett Slepian, who performed abortions at a clinic in Buffalo, New York; Kopp was one of the FBI Ten Most Wanted Fugitives prior to his capture in 2001.
Steven Warshak	04431-061		Released from custody in 2016; served 9 years.	Founder of Berkeley Nutraceuticals; convicted in 2008 of fraud and money laundering for bilking customers out of $100 million; the story was featured on the CNBC television program American Greed.
Jonathan (Jon) Leissler	31333-512		Currently serving	Embezzled over $4,500,000 from his employer, spent on a real State Senate election in 2024 (which he lost) and personal luxury items like private jets and beachfront condos, convicted in April 2026

== See also ==
- List of U.S. federal prisons
- Federal Bureau of Prisons
- Incarceration in the United States
