= Social impact of the COVID-19 pandemic in the United States =

The COVID-19 pandemic in the United States had far-reaching consequences in the country that went beyond the spread of the disease itself and efforts to quarantine it, including political, cultural, and social implications.

== Illnesses and deaths ==
A year into the pandemic, a half-million Americans (1 out of every 670 Americans) had died of COVID-19.

Many people were affected by grief and loss. By the time a half-million Americans had died, one-third of Americans participating in a survey said they personally knew someone who had died this way. (The figures may have been lower due to the types of people being surveyed.) One researcher concluded that, on average, nine close relatives survived to grieve each person who died of COVID-19. By February 2021, about 40,000 U.S. children under the age of 18 had lost at least one parent to the disease.

In addition to the loss of life, the disease can also cause long-term illness, the effects of which may be harder to calculate. Some COVID survivors are left with long-term symptoms such as fatigue, confusion, headache, stomachache, shortness of breath, and loss of sense of smell. Prolonged manifestations of the disease are informally called "long COVID" and the sufferers are called "long-haulers."

== Lockdowns ==
States, territories, and counties that issued a stay-at-home order: Came into effect between March 15 and 21 Came into effect between March 22 and 28 Came into effect between March 29 and April 4 Came into effect between April 5 and 11 No order ever issued Full map including municipalities

Research suggests that the COVID pandemic increased social isolation, especially for those who lived alone and worked in jobs that could be performed remotely. Their isolation levels did not return to pre-pandemic levels.

Though the raw share of socially isolated people living alone is greater than those who live with family (see other chart), the present chart shows that the increase in pandemic-related social isolation was also experienced by those living with family.

To encourage residents to remain in their homes in order to help suppress the spread of COVID-19, most U.S. states (either state-wide or phased in on a county-by-county basis) began to impose "stay-at-home orders" from mid-March 2020 onward. These orders typically restricted any public "gatherings" and mandated the closure of entertainment and recreation venues (including bars, casinos, fitness facilities, theaters), dine-in restaurants (although take-out and delivery service could still be offered), and other "non-essential" retail businesses. Certain types of businesses were allowed to remain open (subject to social distancing guidelines), including food stores (such as grocery stores), pharmacies, financial institutions, critical infrastructure, and mass media. In some states, hotels were also ordered to close. Several states also set up police checkpoints at their borders.

These orders encouraged residents to stay home as much as possible unless they were conducting an essential business (such as grocery shopping or medical care for themselves or family members), recreational exercise, or a job that cannot be performed via remote work. The state of New York mandated remote work by non-essential employees of any business.

By April 2, about 90% of the U.S. population was under some sort of restriction. After implementing social distancing and stay-at-home orders, many states were able to sustain an effective transmission rate ("R_{t}") of less than one.

=== Reopening ===
On March 24, Donald Trump expressed a target of lifting restrictions "if it's good" by April 12, the Easter holiday, for "packed churches all over our country". However, a survey of prominent economists by the University of Chicago indicated that abandoning an economic lock-down prematurely would do more economic damage than maintaining it. The New York Times said, "There is, however, a widespread consensus among economists and public health experts that lifting the restrictions would impose huge costs in additional lives lost to the virus—and deliver little lasting benefit to the economy." On March 29, Trump extended the federal physical distancing recommendations until the end of April.

Ohio Governor Mike DeWine said employers must redesign workplaces to keep workers six feet apart or let them conduct remote work. Connecticut required employers who were open to keep workers six feet apart, deliver products to customers at curbside or by delivery when possible, protect workers with barriers such as Plexiglas, prohibit sharing equipment or desks and if possible have employees eat and take breaks alone in their cars or at their workstations. Commutes by mass transit, where it is not possible to stay six feet apart, posed a challenge to repoening, as did colleges, since many lacked large enough classrooms to keep students six feet apart.

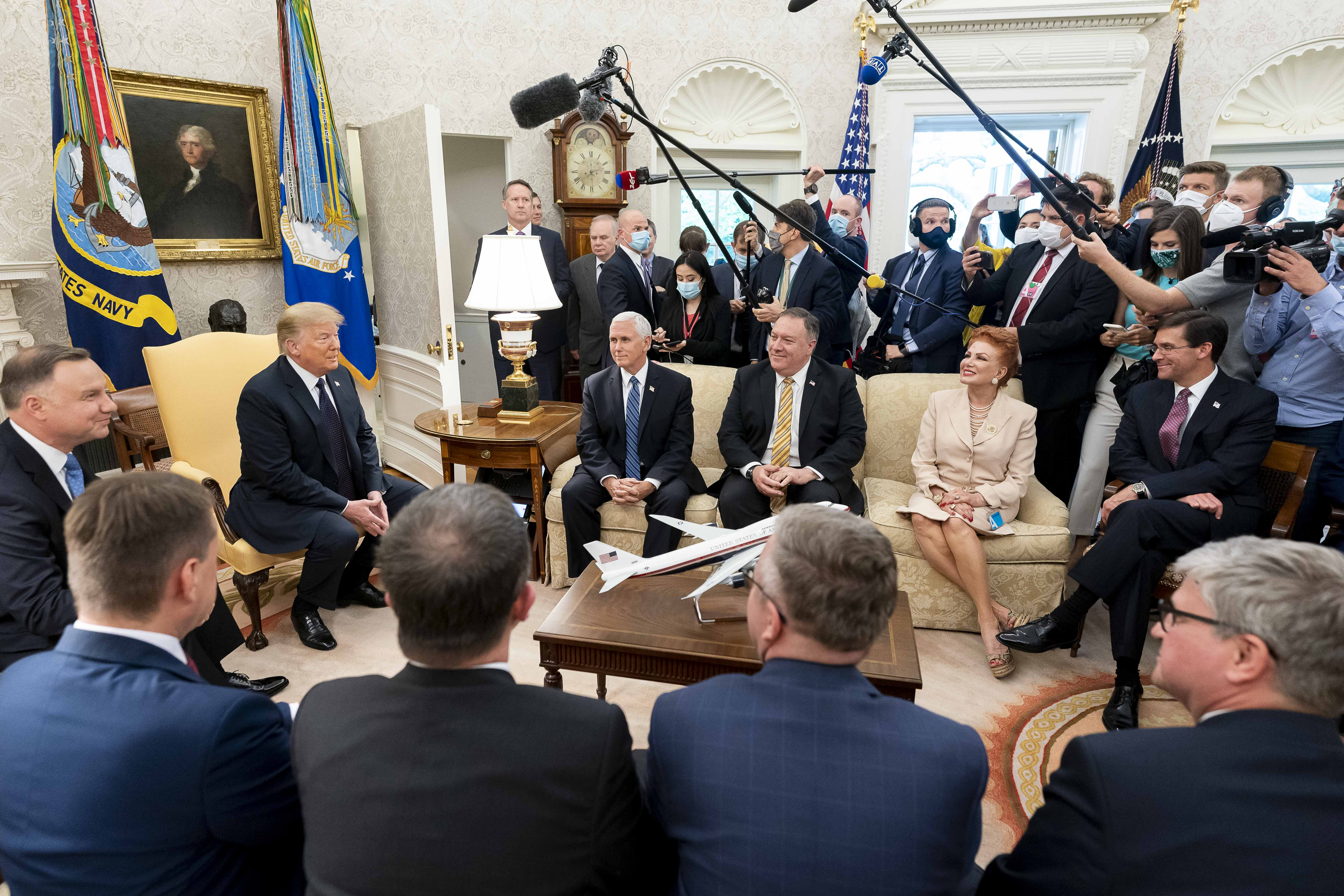
Poland's president Andrzej Duda was the first foreign leader to travel to the White House since the start of the COVID-19 pandemic.

In late April 2020, pressure increased on states to remove economic and personal restrictions. On April 19 the Trump administration released a three-phase advisory plan for states to follow, called "Opening Up America Again". Protests calling for an end to restrictions were held in more than a dozen states. Governors in several states took steps to re-open some businesses the last week of April, even though they did not meet the benchmarks set out in the federal guidelines. Trump alternately encouraged and discouraged the reopening actions. After several meat processing plants were temporarily closed due to coronavirus cases among plant workers, President Trump used the Defense Production Act to order that open plants remain open, and that closed plants re-open with healthy workers.

The CDC prepared detailed guidelines for businesses, public transit, restaurants, religious entities, schools, and other public places that may wish to reopen. In early May, the guidelines were edited down; however, the original seven pages were provided to the Associated Press. Six flow charts were ultimately published on May 15, and a 60-page set of guidelines was released without comment on May 20, weeks after many states had already emerged from lockdowns.

On June 8, 2020, The New York Times published the results of its survey in which 511 epidemiologists were asked: "when they expect to resume 20 activities of daily life". Slightly over half of the doctors surveyed responded that they expected to stop "routinely wearing a face covering" in one year or more.

A 69-page document marked "For Internal Use Only" obtained by The New York Times classified the reopening of districts, universities, and individual schools as high risk. The document surfaced after experts warned of the high risk of reopening schools.

== Educational impact ==
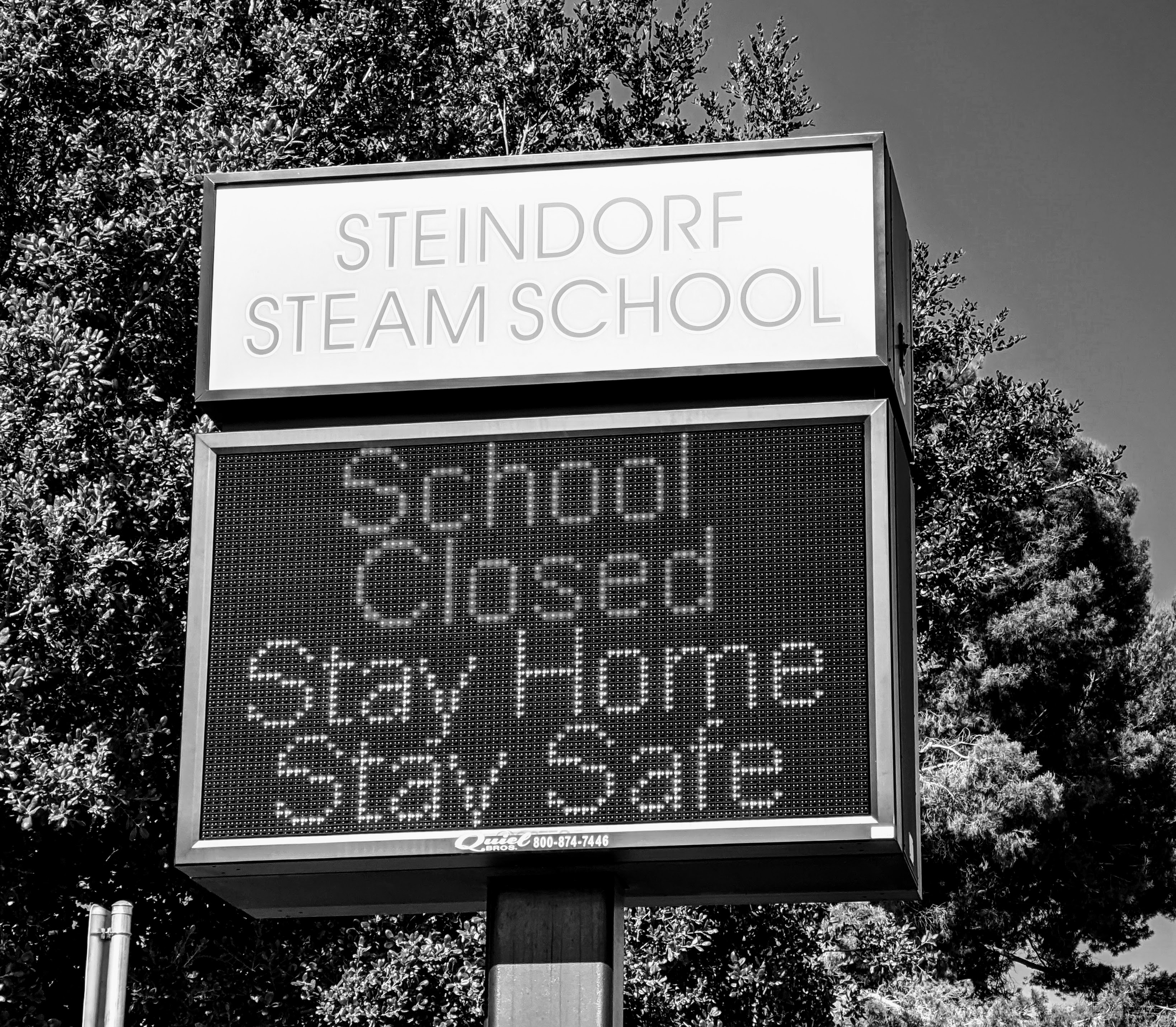
Closed sign at a school in San Jose, California, May 2020

As of April 10, 2020, most American public and private schools—at least 124,000—had closed nationwide, affecting at least 55.1 million students. By April 22, school buildings had been ordered or recommended to be closed for the remainder of the academic year in 39 states, three territories, and the District of Columbia. As schools shifted education to online learning, there were concerns about student access to necessary technology, absenteeism, and accommodations for special needs students. School systems also looked to adjust grading scales and graduation requirements to mitigate the disruption caused by the unprecedented closures.

During the 2019-2020 school year the national high school graduation rate decreased by 0.7% after a decade long increase in the graduation rate. However, by the following school year the national high school graduation rate began to increase once again.

To ensure poor students continued to receive lunches while schools were closed, many states and school districts arranged for "grab-and-go" lunch bags or used school bus routes to deliver meals to children. To provide legal authority for such efforts, the U.S. Department of Agriculture waived several school lunch program requirements.

Many higher educational institutions canceled classes and closed dormitories in response to the outbreak, including all members of the Ivy League, and many other public and private universities across the country. Many universities also expanded the use of pass/fail grading for the Spring 2020 semester.

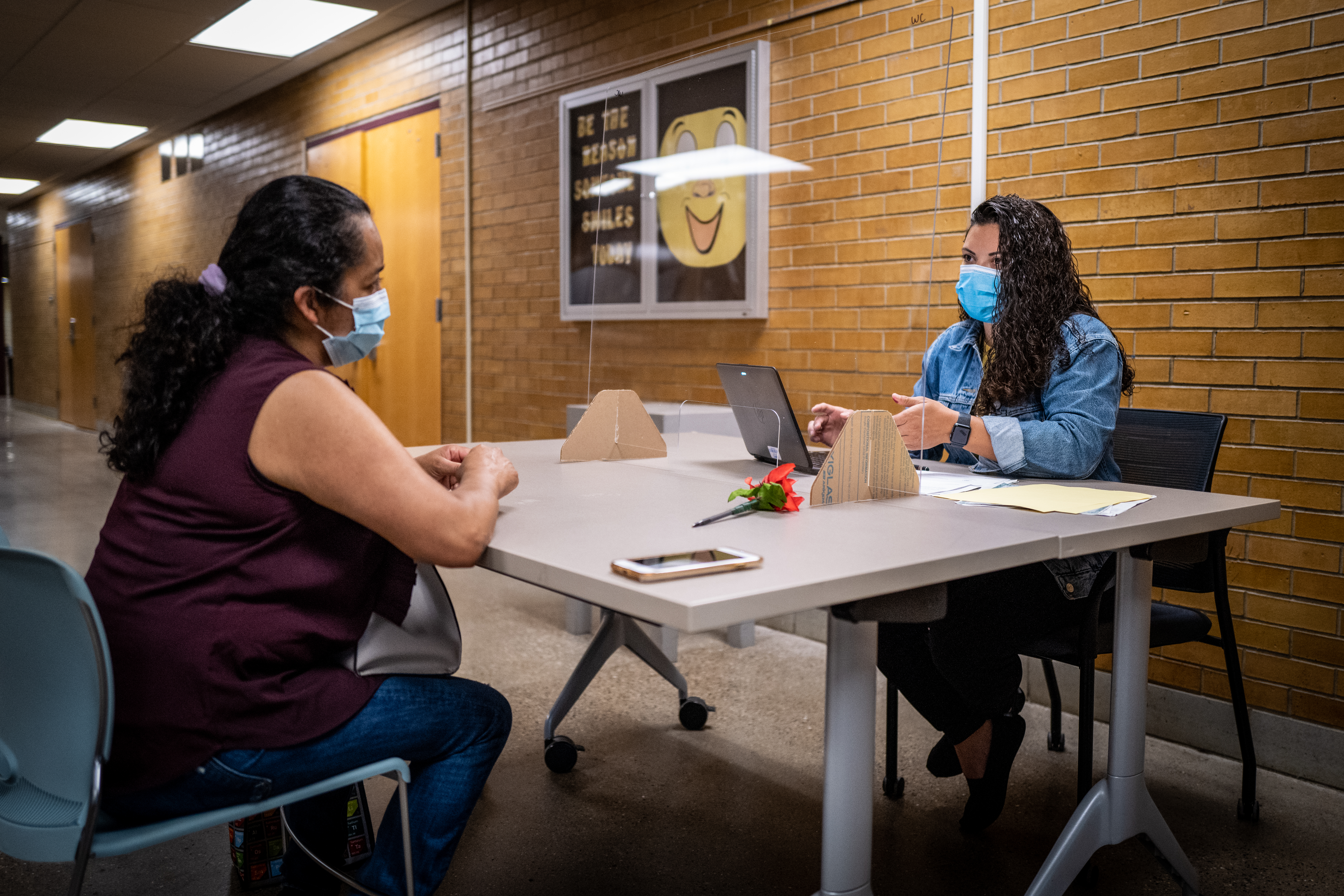
A school employee and parent in Des Moines, Iowa meet about school registration through plexiglass, July 2020

Due to the disruption to the academic year caused by the COVID-19 pandemic, the U.S. Department of Education approved a waiver process, allowing states to opt-out of standardized testing required under the Every Student Succeeds Act. In addition, the College Board eliminated traditional face-to-face Advanced Placement exams in favor of an online exam that could be taken at home. The College Board also cancelled SAT testing in March and May in response to the pandemic. Similarly, April ACT exams were rescheduled for June 2020.

The Department of Education also authorized limited student loan relief, allowing borrowers to suspend payments for at least two months without accruing interest.

In July 2020, Education Secretary Betsy DeVos announced that she intended to have all American schools open for in-person classes for the 2020–2021 school year.

There were broader effects of school closures beyond the immediate crisis. As of the beginning of the 2020-21 school year in New York City, with 1.1 million school children, 84% of white public-school parents said their child would attend school in-person if possible, compared to 63% of Latinx parents and just 34% of Black parents. Families with greater money, mobility, and access increasingly withdrew from public education, forming private-pay pods costing $30,000 per year. Other families placed their children in religious school, which could cost $8,000+ per year.

Many caregivers left the workforce, facing no other options amid the breakdown of public safety nets. Amid the health risks of offering school; the risks of isolation, disconnection, and educational regression of school disruption; this risk of inequitable access was also critical. Parental choices across race and income posed risk of increased segregation, disparate outcomes, growing inequity, and future public disinvestment in a longer-term post-COVID landscape.

One significant outbreak during the Fall 2020 semester occurred at the State University of New York at Oneonta. Residence halls reopened on August 17, and within two months there were over 700 coronavirus cases among the student body, as a result of which the university president resigned.

Due to the lock downs, the development of many children has been stunted as they found education online difficult, and are now having to deal with the effects of this, making learning harder for students and teachers alike as a result of the disruption caused by COVID-19.

== Transportation ==
=== Public transportation ===
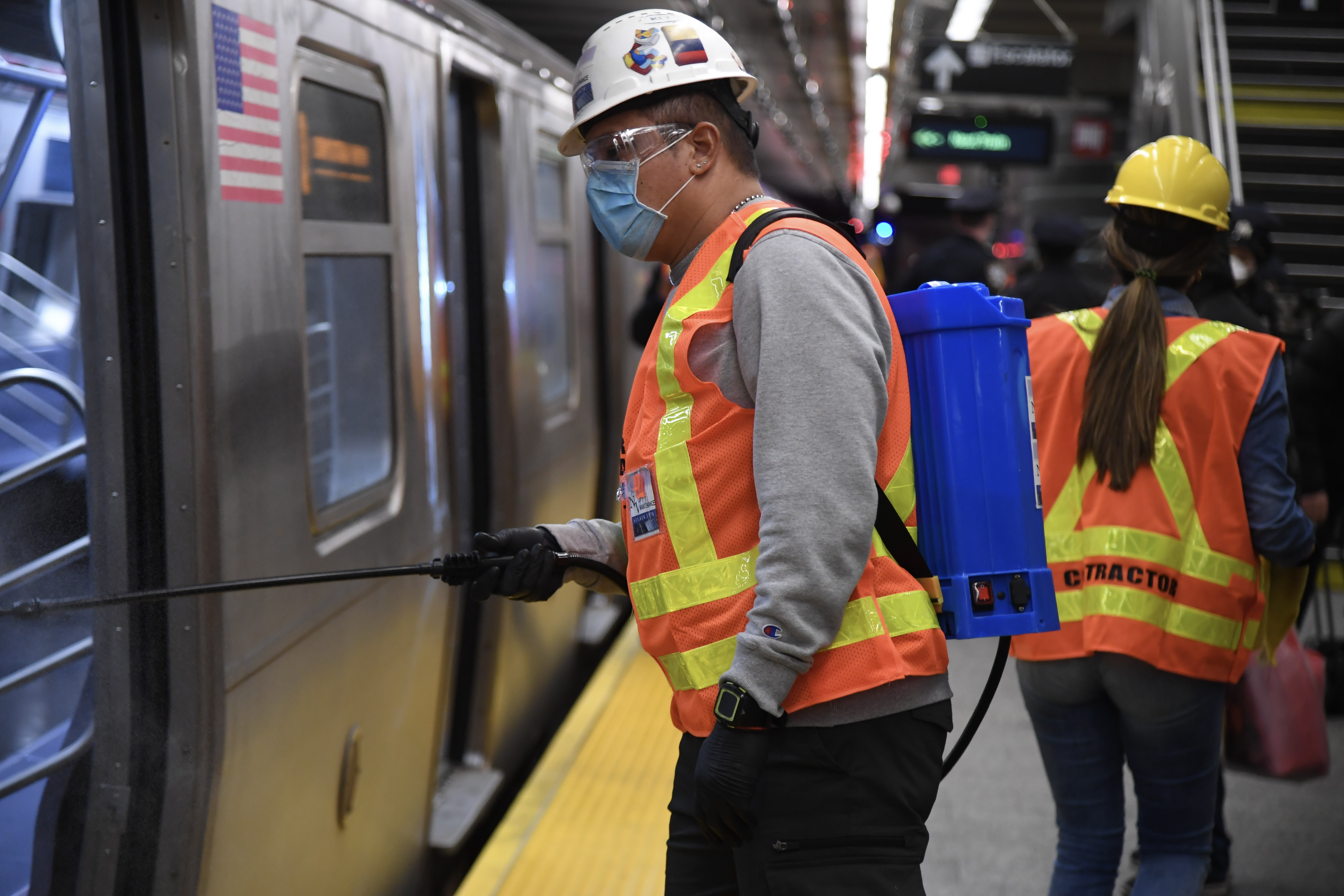
May 5: The New York City Subway began planned overnight shutdowns, the first in its 115-year history, to conduct cleaning.

Several of the largest mass transit operators in the U.S. reduced service in response to lower demand caused by remote work policies and self-quarantines. The loss of fares and sales tax, a common source of operating revenue, is predicted to cause long-term effects on transit expansion and maintenance. The American Public Transportation Association issued a request for $13 billion in emergency funding from the federal government to cover lost revenue and other expenses incurred by the pandemic. In mid-April it was reported that demand for transit service was down by an average of 75 percent nationwide, with figures of 85% in San Francisco and 60% in Philadelphia. Many localities reported an increase in bicycling as residents sought socially distant means of getting around. In 2020, fatalities increased to nearly 38,680 in the US due to fewer people driving on the road.

==== Air travel ====
A dramatic reduction in the number of passengers was with 96% less being on flights in April 2020 compared to a year earlier in April 2019. In 2020 alone, 41% fewer flights were flown by airlines from the US. Demand for domestic air travel dropped 48.8% in 2020. Planes which were not being used were simply placed in the desert to prevent corrosion of parts. Airline crew members were expected to keep working during the pandemic and during 2020 there was no mask mandate for airline crew members but starting on January 21, 2021 after President Biden took office an Executive Order was issued requiring all passengers and workers aboard or at transport hubs to wear masks. Most people would comply with wearing masks.

=== Traffic safety ===
In 2020, fatalities increased to nearly 38,680 in the US due to fewer people driving on the road. That year there was 115% more — or twice more — fatalities in the US than in the EU, or 53% less in the EU than in the US.

== Prisons and correctional facilities ==
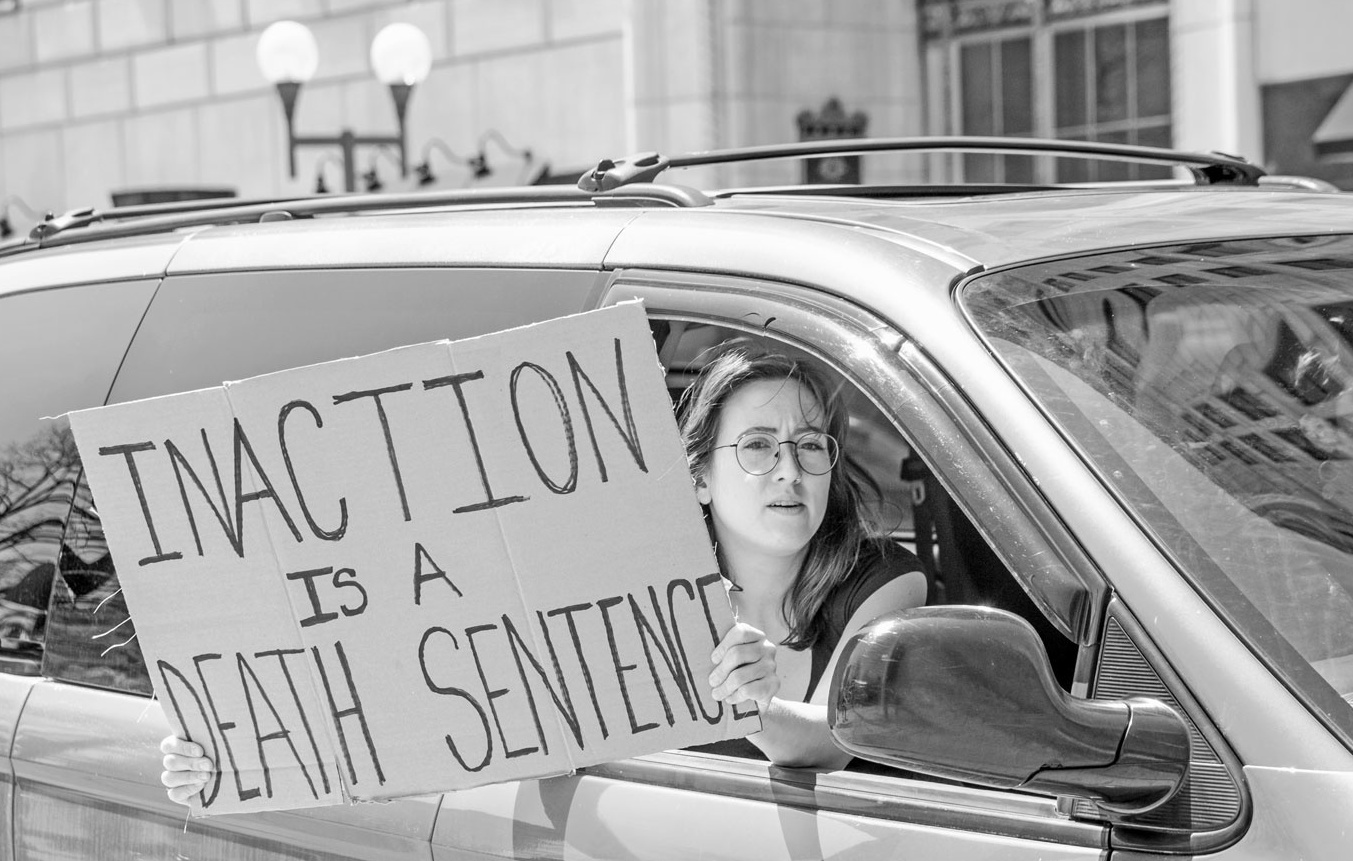
Protest in Columbus, Ohio calling for release of low-risk prisoners because of COVID-19 risks, May 2020

The pandemic put tremendous strain on the American incarceration system due to crowds of vulnerable inmates and limited access to medical care. The social distancing required to minimize the spread of infection has been difficult if not impossible to practice in compliance with existing standards of practice; and facilities were slow to adopt new, health-conscious policies. According to a research team at Northwestern University in September 2021, "U.S. facilities 'have effectively become infectious disease incubators'"; and the president of the Cook Country Board of Commissioners stated that "'our jails are petri dishes'". At peak, as many as 25,000 prisoners across the United States tested positive for COVID-19 in a single week. By June 2021 more than 500,000 prisoners had tested positive for COVID-19; and as of December 2021, about 34 of every 100 people in US prisons had been infected with COVID-19, almost 4-times the rate of the national population. and there is widespread belief that such data coming from detention facilities is inaccurate and underreported.

To reduce transmission within facilities, the Federal Bureau of Prisons tried implementing near-total lockdowns beginning on April 1, 2020. Where other forms of social distancing were unpracticable (usually due to overcrowding), some facilities opted to place inmates in solitary confinement. During 2020, about 300,000 inmates in America were in solitary confinement on any given day—between a 4- and 6-fold increase from prior averages. But this method of isolation came with its own dangers—more than half of prison suicides occur in solitary confinement; and the incidence of self-harm was as much as 10 times higher—and it did little to mitigate the causes of transmission.

Facility managers widely failed to accommodate bloated prison populations or take appropriate sanitation measures as recommended by public health officials. Inmates report having little access to PPE or cleaning supplies; and there were multiple public complaints of prison staff flouting masking directives. Correctional officers were among the demographics most resistant to the adoption of COVID-19 safety protocols. Their professional responsibilities, including but not limited to conducting pat-downs and interrupting fights, also required them to often be in close proximity to inmates. Inadequate testing of detainees, less-than-average vaccination rates, and minimal social-distancing during meals, recreation, and bathing tended to negate whatever precautions may have been taken.

There have been multiple COVID-19 outbreaks within American detention facilities since the beginning of the pandemic in the spring of 2020. One such incident occurred in Bledsoe Correctional Complex in Pikeville, Tennessee in April 2020. According to Dr. Kenneth Williams, the medical director for the Tennessee Department of Corrections, the main cause of the outbreak was the transmission of infection from the surrounding community into the facility by correctional officers. Such community spread continues to be a dominant concern for detention facilities throughout the country. In addition, inter-center transfers and return from work release can also facilitate transmission.

Consistently inadequate accommodations within facilities, especially during the COVID-19 pandemic, have been the cause for many ongoing protest movements throughout the country. Within the first months of the pandemic, several ICE detention centers were home to hunger strikes in response to inadequate COVID-19 protections. Prisoners are more likely to have preexisting and/or underlying conditions which make them susceptible to illness, especially in facilities the deteriorating quality of which can exacerbate poor health. According to US BJS data, "50% of prisoners had a chronic condition ... and 21% had an infectious disease". The elderly are also particularly at risk of contracting COVID-19, with obvious consequences for inmates with long or life-sentences. Prisons were as full with elderly inmates as they had ever been, with the number of elderly state prisoners quadrupling between 1993 and 2013. The most at-risk inmates also have the highest costs of care (upwards of $15bn annually), making their early release both epidemiologically and financially prudent.

The harms perpetrated by American detention facilities during the COVID-19 pandemic have disproportionately affected racial minorities—mostly Black and Hispanic people—who are incarcerated at as much as 5 times the rate of white people.

According to some estimates, a significant reduction to US inmate populations could have resulted in millions of fewer cases and tens of thousands of fewer deaths nationally. To alleviate some of the pressures of associated with stringent health mandates, and in response to various public criticisms, some jurisdictions released a number of prisoners who are particularly vulnerable to infection or, alternatively, halted the intake of new inmates who would have been detained for technical offenses. Critics continue to advocate for alternatives to incarceration like house arrest or electronic monitoring, for decarceration measures such as parole and ROR, and for the suspension of new admissions for technical offenses like parole and probation violations.

The pandemic also presented an opportunity to reform the juvenile detention system in attempts to further reduce the number of people in correctional facilities throughout America. As of May 2020, "at least ten states had publicly announced state-wide efforts to reduce their youth population behind bars" commensurate with the demands of the pandemic, with the effect that "the number of youth detained in secure facilities dropped by a third between March 1, 2020 and May 1, 2020". Technological advances geared towards facilitating remote and virtual interaction may likewise serve to facilitate community supervision of and routine check-ins with youth on probation or parole.

On December 21, 2021, Attorney General Merrick Garland's DOJ issued a memo suggesting that many of those who had been reassigned to "home confinement" during the pandemic would not be required to return to a correctional facility to finish their sentences "'when the emergency period ends'". This decision followed consistent criticism from domestic and international advocacy groups regarding the unnecessary and often prolonged detention of non-violent offenders. Other political executives were encouraged to exercise clemency and expand the use of good conduct credits, among a host of additional remedies legally available to them.

== Immigration and Americans abroad ==
=== Border closures ===
Starting on March 21, 2020 the US-Canada and US-Mexico borders were closed to all "non-essential traffic".

=== Repatriation of Americans abroad ===
The State Department did a repatriation effort that was of a historic scale repatriating 101,386 Americans who were abroad between January 27, 2020 and June 10.

=== Undocumented immigrants ===
Undocumented immigrants consist of individuals who came to the United States from other countries while violating the immigration laws and standards.

==== Access to health services and insurance ====
Because of their unique status, undocumented immigrants face lower access to heath services than US citizens and document immigrants. In the US, non-citizens are more likely than citizens to be uninsured. According to Kaiser Family Foundation, roughly 46% non-elderly undocumented immigrants were uninsured in 2019.

The Trump Public Charge Rule went into effect on February 24, 2020. Under the new rule, use of certain health programs or services would count as a negative mark on a visa application. As a result, documented and undocumented immigrants alike were discouraged from using the few resources available to them. Using public services like Medicaid could jeopardize their immigration status, and this rule added an additional source of stress and uncertainty during the pandemic.

In February 2022, the Department of Homeland Security announced changes to the Public Charge Rule that will not consider non-cash benefits when determining inadmissible status for entry or permanent residence.

Furthermore, the undocumented status results in individuals having a harder time securing medical reimbursement from non-insurance sources like charitable organizations. Even when there are resources available, many people of undocumented status express hesitancy in utilizing care resources for fear of exposing their status. A US Immigration Policy Center Study indicates vaccine willingness in undocumented immigrant communities decreased after the Trump administration instituted many immigration regulation changes.

==== Immigration detention ====
The pandemic had a significant impact on immigration enforcement along the U.S.-Mexico border. During the pandemic and under the Trump administration, the CDC invoked Title 42, an immigration policy allowing federal authorities to deny migrants' asylum in the event of an imminent threat to public health.

The CDC announced its intention to phase out Title 42 by the end of May 2022 and claimed that the policy was no longer necessary to protect public health. Phasing out the controversial policy returned immigration policy to Title 8, which allows refugees to seek asylum status if they can prove flight from persecution.

The end of Title 42 under the Biden administration was met with mixed responses along partisan lines. Many democrats lauded the end of a policy that led to the expulsion of 80% of migrant encounters during the Trump administration, but Missouri, Arizona, and Louisiana sued the administration over its announcement.

More than 38,000 people were detained by U.S. Immigration and Customs Enforcement (ICE) at the time of the outbreak of COVID-19 in the United States. ICE's response to the outbreak in detention facilities was widely characterized as substandard and dangerous. Detained people reported that they were being forced into unsafe, unsanitary, and harmful conditions. Serious irregularities in ICE's testing data were reported while ICE blocked coronavirus testing information at its facilities from being released to the public. The American Civil Liberties Union referred to the COVID-19 pandemic in U.S. immigration detention as "an unquestionable public health disaster".

==== Medical deportation ====
Medical Deportation, sometimes referred to as Medical Repatriation, is a risk many illegal immigrants face, and often prevents them from utilizing the health sources offered to them. Medical deportation involves the non-consensual movement of a patient who is critically ill or injured from the United States to another country. Hospitals are only required to treat all people equally regardless of legal or pay status until they reach a stable condition. Continuous care for a patient can be even more expensive than transportation to another country, and so there is a financial incentive for hospitals to remove certain patients from their direct care. Furthermore, a hospital's requirement to report immigration status is nuanced. In general, hospitals are considered sensitive locations because of their responsibility to treat the injured and sick, where immigration enforcement actions are to be limited. Protected Health Information includes citizenship and immigration status and therefore is protected by the Health Insurance Portability and Accountability Act (HIPAA).

Medical deportation refers to the process of forcibly removing a non-citizen from a country due to their medical condition. This can happen when a person's medical condition is deemed to be a burden on the country's healthcare system or when their condition poses a risk to public health. The decision to deport someone on medical grounds is typically made by immigration officials, in consultation with medical professionals. The practice was controversial, with some arguing that it violated a person's human rights and creates a financial burden on the individual and their family.

== Xenophobia and racism ==
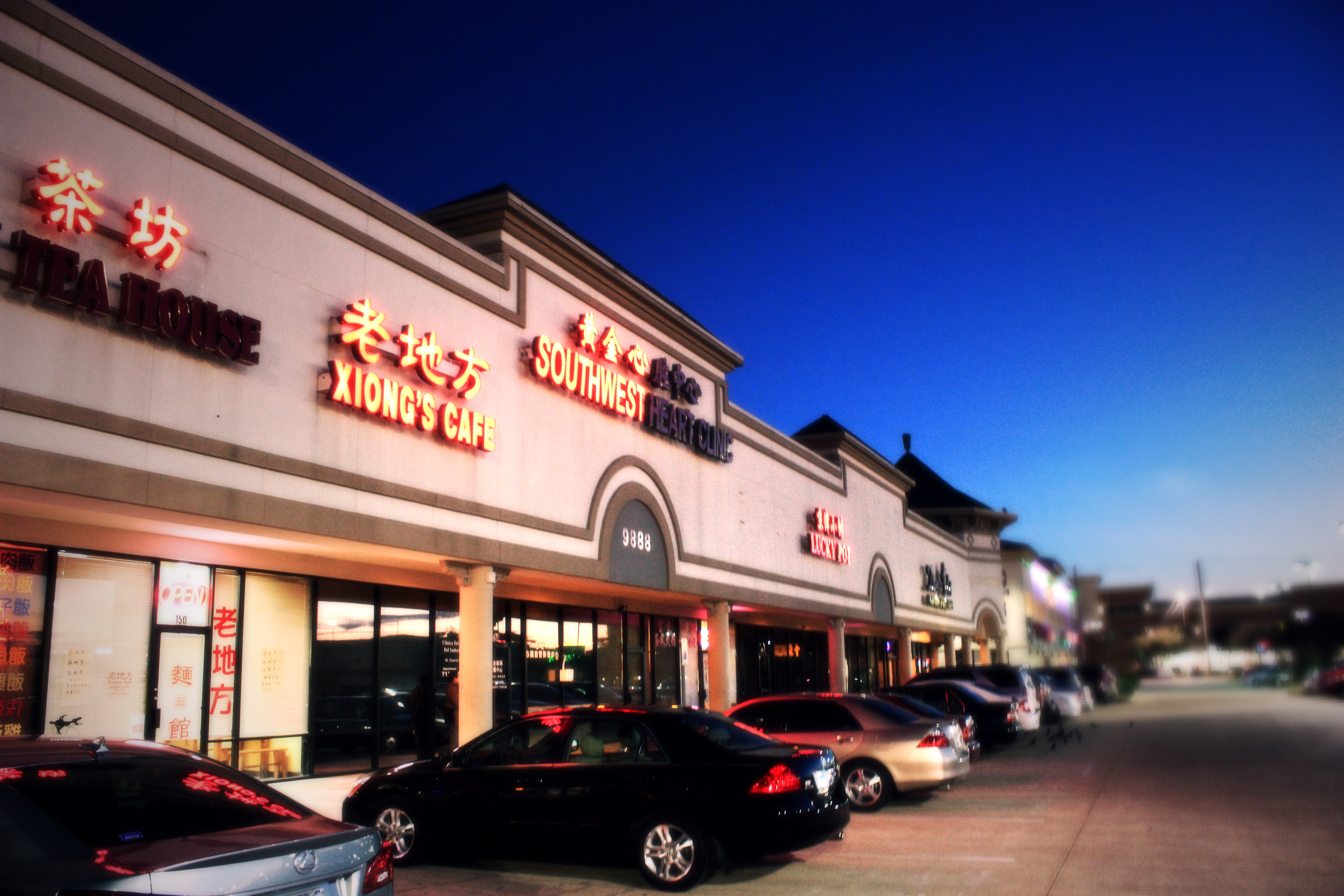
Chinatown in Houston faced a drop in customers after people falsely and maliciously spread rumors online of an outbreak of the coronavirus.

Since the beginning of the COVID-19 pandemic, a major concern amongst the American population has been the rapid proliferation of the virus. This fear, promoted by skewed media coverage, has manifested in more frequent acts of xenophobia and racism towards the Asian-American community in the United States. COVID-19 originated in China and by proxy Chinese and Asian Americans were subjected to a large rise in hate crimes and instances of xenophobia and racism. In 2020 alone, law enforcement in NYC observed a ninefold increase in the number of hate crimes reported by Asian-Americans; in Los Angeles County, these hate crimes increased by 15%. A hate crime can come in many forms, including verbal harassment, shunning, physical assault, civil rights violations, online harassment, and more. These hate crimes had greater effects on the Asian American community in the U.S., as many faced workplace discrimination and lost their jobs. Additionally, the perpetration of discrimination via online sources, social media, and more allowed hate crimes to become increasingly "common, uncontrolled and unreported." These actions had immense and detrimental impacts to the safety, mental health, and security of the victims, as well as growing feelings of isolation and fear.

=== Historical context of xenophobia and racism towards Asian Americans ===
Overall, these attacks represent a continuation of xenophobic attacks on Chinese Americans that has gone on for over 150 years. The pandemic brought to light the ways in which older and persistent ideas of Orientalism, or the prominent idea of the 18th and 19th centuries that those of European descent are better than non-Europeans, as well as white supremacy continue to influence the actions of many individuals. The COVID-19 pandemic allowed for the continued and exacerbated "othering" of the Asian-American community, where they have been scapegoated and related to danger and fear because of their race.

=== Impacts of xenophobia and racism towards Asian Americans ===
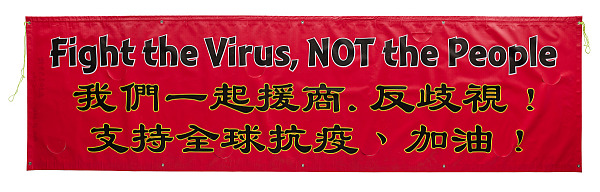
This banner was created by members of San Francisco's Chinatown community for a 1,000-person rally and march that took place on February 29, 2020, against anti-Asian sentiment.

The social impacts of racism and xenophobia towards the Asian-American community in the U.S. had far reaching consequences. For example, a survey conducted in San Francisco found that only 3% of Asian-American residents had been tested for COVID-19, many of whom cited fears of racism and stigma as major contributors to their avoidance of such resources. In turn, Asian American health has been disproportionately challenged by the virus, as a study by Chan et al. from Cambridge University found, "that while Asian Americans make up a small proportion of COVID-19 deaths in the USA, they experience significantly higher excess all-cause mortality (3.1 times higher), case fatality rate (as high as 53% higher), and percentage of deaths attributed to COVID-19 (2.1 times higher) compared to non-Hispanic Whites." This speaks to a high burden of disease amongst the Asian American population that is then compounded by horrific acts of racism and xenophobia.

Early on in the pandemic, Asian Americans were often left out of the conversation on health disparities. Due to a lot of factors, such as lack of trust, language barriers, limited funding, and ultimately "covert and overt forms of racism" at play towards the community, there was a lack of ongoing Asian American and Pacific Islander (AAPI) research related to the particular disparities they face. This gap in recognition of health disparities burden for the community and research is a potential space for improvement moving forward.

=== Legislation and advocacy ===
To address the disparities faced by the Asian American community, President Joe Biden issued an executive order to ban terminology such as "china virus" and "kung flu" that perpetuate harmful stereotypes and fuel fear-based discrimination. Additionally, President Biden signed the COVID-19 Hate Crimes Act into law on May 20, 2021, which allows for expedited reviews of hate crimes at the Department of Justice and provides grants for improving reporting systems at the state level. Furthermore, states such as California allocated millions of dollars to increase data collection and support advocacy efforts.

== Racial disparities ==
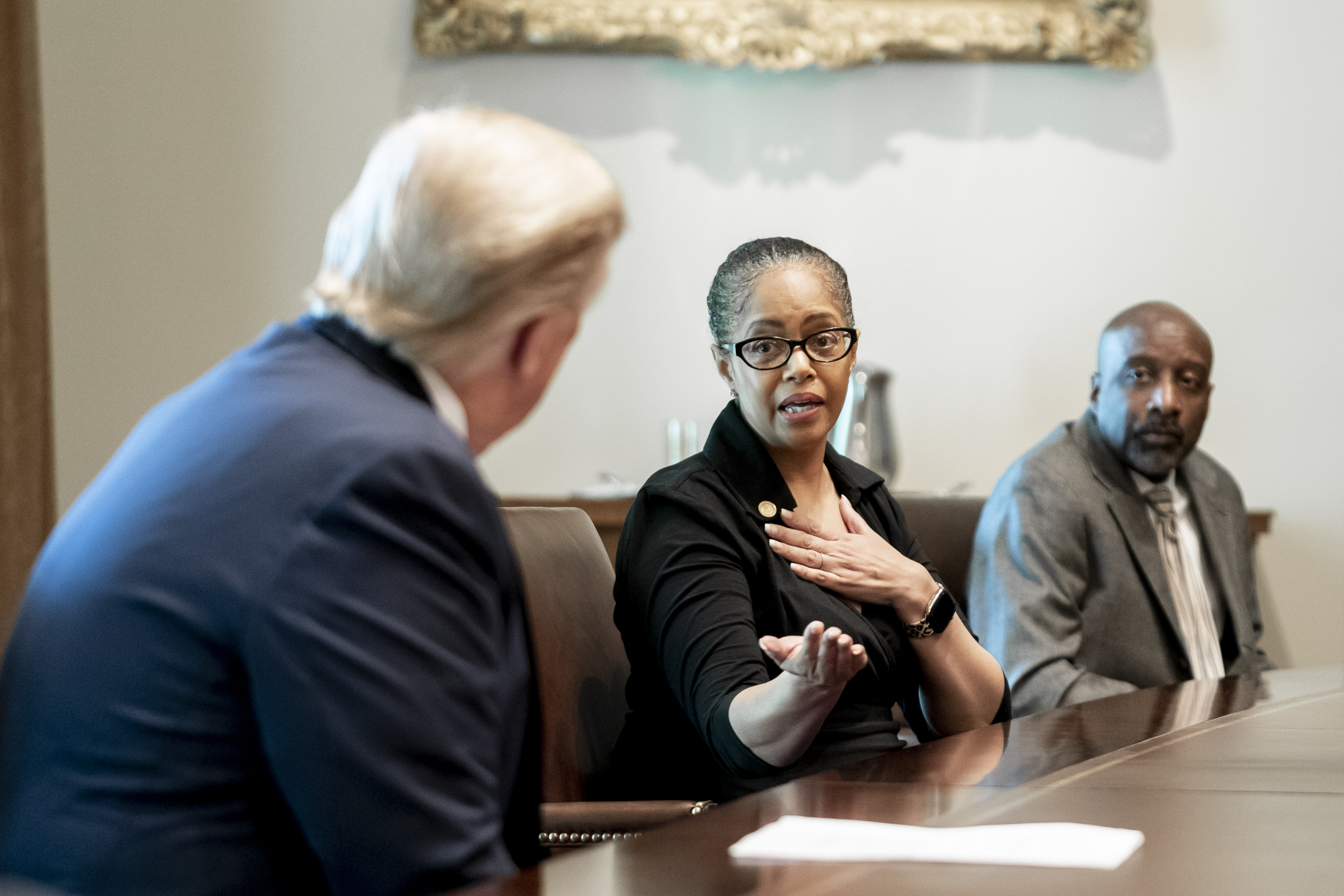
Donald Trump listens to Michigan State Representative Karen Whitsett talk about her recovery from COVID-19. Black Americans in Michigan and elsewhere have suffered from significantly higher rates of infection and mortality than White Americans.

Black, Latinx, and Indigenous populations experience significantly higher rates of COVID-19 morbidity and mortality compared to the proportion of the population they represent. ProPublica conducted an analysis of the racial composition of COVID-19 cases in Milwaukee County, Wisconsin, dating through the morning of April 3. They noted that African Americans comprised nearly half the county's cases and 22 of its 27 deaths.

Similar trends were seen in regions with sizable African American populations, especially in Deep South states such as Alabama, Georgia, and Louisiana (which reported on April 6 that 70% of its reported deaths had involved African Americans). These patterns have been observed in Michigan (33% of cases and 41% of deaths as of April 6, 2020), the city of Richmond, Virginia (48% of the city population, 62% of cases, and 100% of its eight deaths as of April 15, 2020), and the city of Chicago, Illinois (1,824 of its 4,680 confirmed cases and 72% of deaths as of April 5, 2020).

African Americans were more likely to have poor living conditions (including dense urban environments and poverty), employment instability, chronic comorbidities influenced by these conditions, and little to no health insurance coverage—factors which can all exacerbate the impact of COVID-19. Black Americans in many states were more likely to be essential workers or people working in jobs that cannot be done remotely during stay-at-home orders. This put them at higher exposure to the virus.

The CDC has not yet released national data on COVID-19 cases based on race; following calls by Democratic lawmakers and the Congressional Black Caucus, the CDC told The Hill it planned to release data on racial composition of cases.

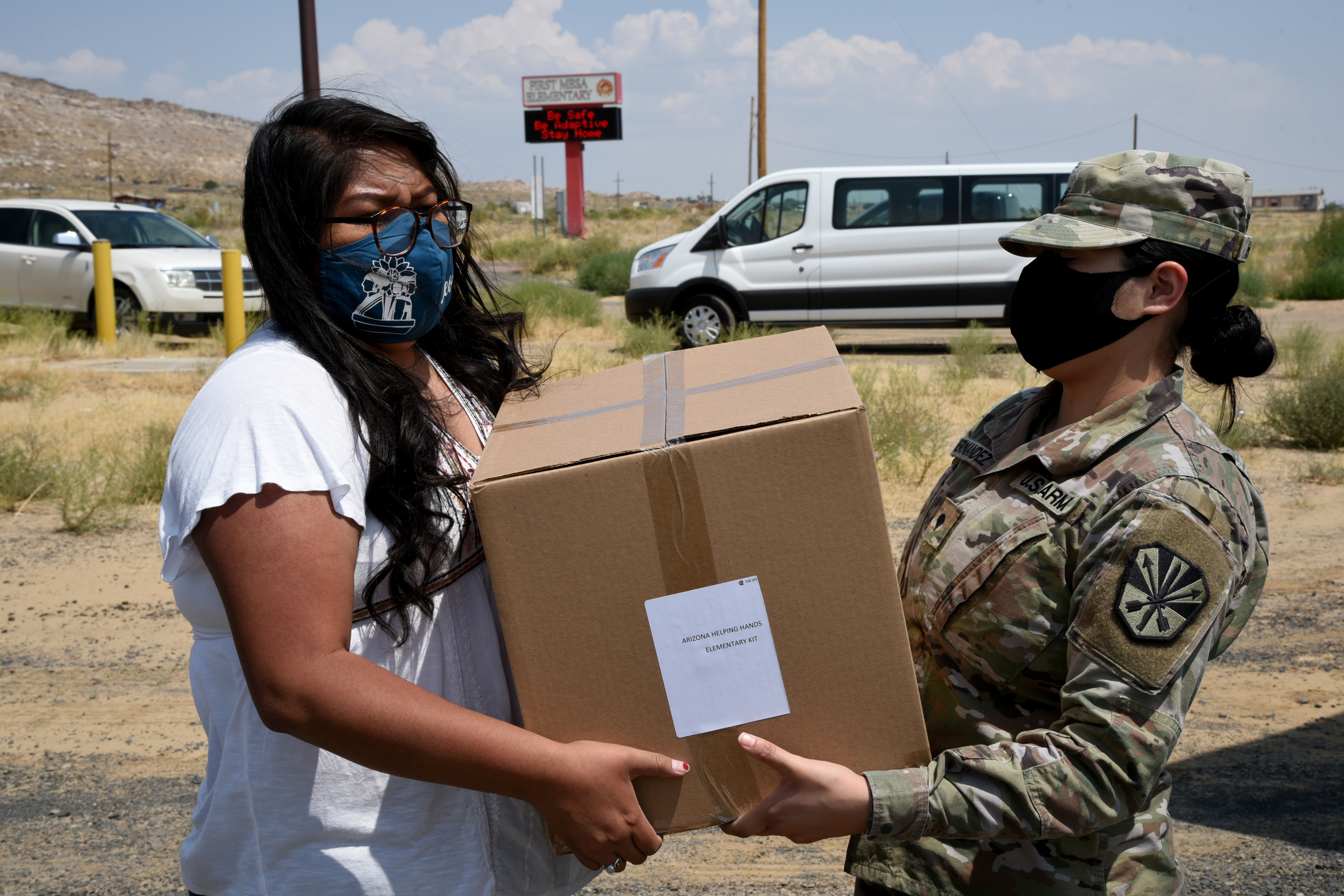
Aid delivery to Hopi students in First Mesa, Arizona, August 2020

Additionally, the Navajo Nation had the highest rate of infection in the United States, surpassing New York state by late May 2020. The COVID-19 pandemic impacted Indigenous settlements (in the U.S.) particularly hard. A range of factors disproportionately impacted indigenous settlements perpetuating poverty, food insecurity, strain on community health, family strain, socioeconomic struggle, and poor physical as well as mental health status.

A CDC report revealed that COVID-19 incidence rates were 3.5 times higher for American Indians/Alaska Natives compared to white Americans during the first 7 months of the pandemic. Intergenerational trauma and structural racism along with the lack of recognition by leadership and governance result in a constantly building allostatic load that results in poor mental health status across the population. Social isolation and lack of community health support during the pandemic contribute to a lack of consideration of the population overall. The social support within the community allows for a collective feeling of strength and community.

The CARES Act and American Rescue Plan Act offered significant funding to Indigenous communities across the U.S., which allowed some tribes to address ongoing infrastructure issues exacerbated by COVID-19, including food security, water access and emergency response. There were so many rules attached to these funds that it was difficult to even use it. On June 21, 2021, tribal members Green, Laura Smith and Leona Gopher protested for better transparency in front of the Blackfeet Tribal Business Council office in Browning, Montana, "I'm tired of what they do to us — it's disgusting," Smith said. "And all of our heads count for all the money they get. That's why I'm down here protesting, because I'm tired of it." These funds, to the Indigenous populations, serve more like a stack of money tied to the hands of American officials so they can feel satisfied thinking they have helped.

According to the National Alliance on Mental Illness, nearly one fifth of Native adults experienced mental illness in the last year and suicide rates are over double that of white youth. It is predicted that COVID-19 only exacerbated these issues and increased such inequity across the Indigenous populations, especially due to grief from the deaths of elders. Sociologists studying COVID's effect on indigenous populations made several recommendations for actions that need to be taken for the survival of those populations. Included in their recommendations were, "Invest in Indigenous Community-Controlled Data Infrastructures and Technology to Support Community Capacity, Response, and Resilience," "Involve Indigenous Peoples' Leaders, Activists, and Scholars in the Mainstream Science/Data/Policy Nexus Decision-Making Processes," "Institute Data Access and Sharing Protocols Between Indigenous Peoples and Other Governments and Data Holders," "Require Collection (and Validation) of Indigenous Identifiers or Affiliation (e.g., Nation, Tribe, Ethnicity)," and "Increasing the Number of Indigenous Epidemiologists to Improve Information for Effective Public Health Response." Mental Health America employs and advocates for culturally competent, trained mental health professionals to work within the field to support indigenous peoples, and offers further resources for people in need including One Sky Center, WeRNative, and StrongHearts Native Helpline.

In 2020 and 2021, after two years of the pandemic, Native Americans and Alaska Natives experienced a precipitous drop in life expectancy to 65 years of age, which was a loss of more than 6.5 years since 2019. On par with the average American life expectancy in 1944 and lower than every country in the Americas except Haiti, this decrease in life expectancy was the worst among all racial groups in the United States. High rates of diabetes and obesity, combined with crowded multigenerational housing, added significantly to the risk of higher mortality among U.S. indigenous populations.

On July 20, 2020, the Strike for Black Lives was held, with organizers citing racial disparities during the pandemic as a cause of the strike.

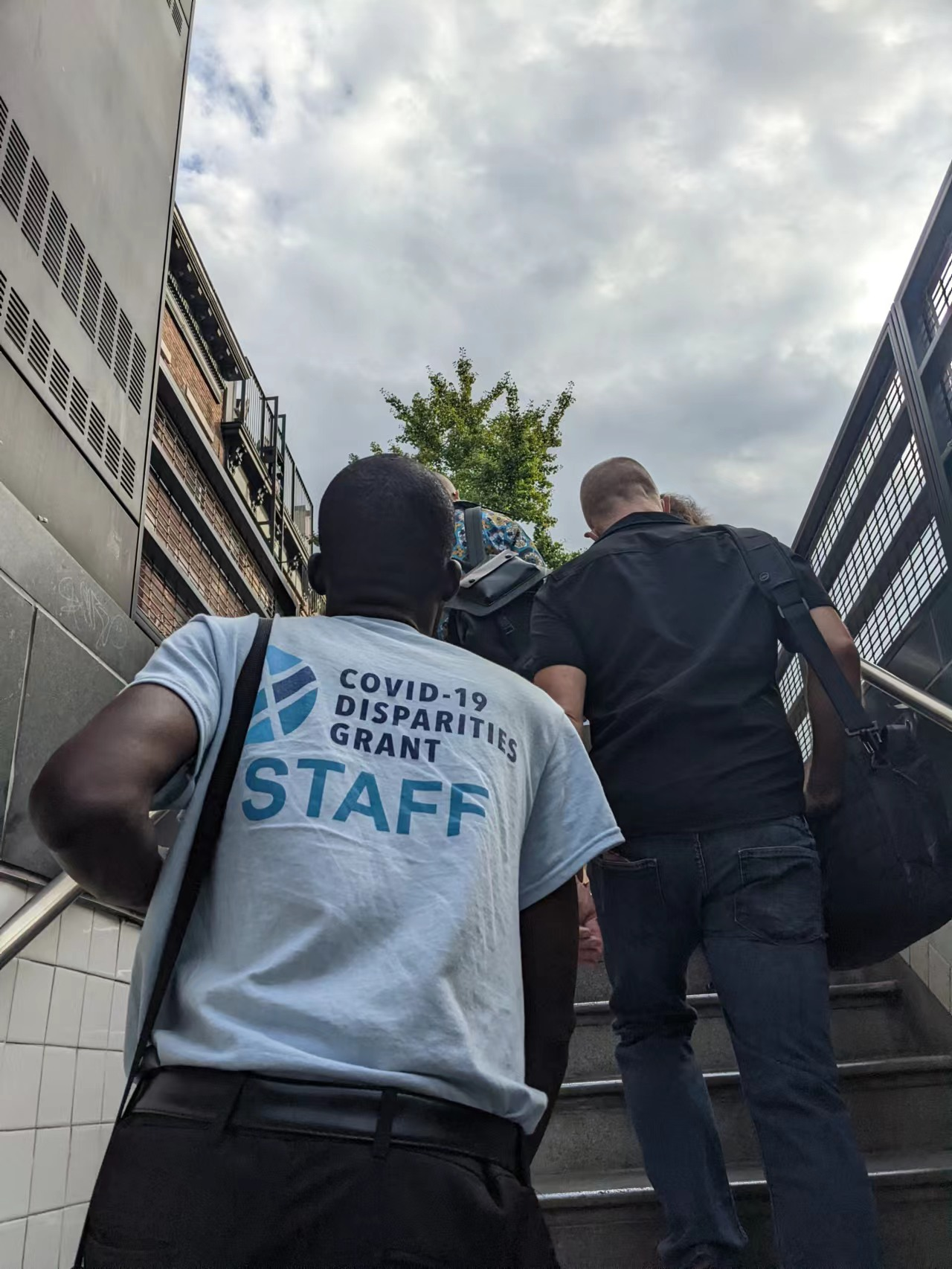
A staff member of the COVID-19 Disparities Grant program exits the subway in Brooklyn, within New York City.

In Houston, as well as elsewhere in Texas, Hispanic Americans were heavily impacted by COVID-19. Many of them are in essential work, live in traditionally multi-generational households, deal with language barriers that block the communication of health information, and have disproportionately low health insurance coverage compared to other ethnicities in the U.S. Additionally, a considerable amount of Hispanics are undocumented immigrants and feared for their immigration status, especially under the Trump presidency which promised hardline immigration laws, making it harder for them to seek medical care.

Filipino Americans were impacted by COVID-19 perhaps more than any ethnic community in the United States. This is because a significant proportion of nurses in critical care and emergency rooms are Filipino-American. In addition this demographic makes up a higher percentage of essential workers in the United States compared to Black and Hispanic Americans.

Language access among limited English proficiency groups was a challenge across the country during the COVID-19 pandemic. Minority status and language proficiency were found to be leading factors in the incidence of infection and mortality, according to a study published in JAMA. Even though Spanish use in major metro areas in the U.S. has been on the decline, it was still spoken at home by more than 37 million Latinos in the U.S. The Coronavirus Language Access Act was introduced in both the 116th Congress and 117th Congress but not passed. In order to provide translations of COVID-19 related communications, the act would have provided $200 million in funding to agencies required to increase language access services. The act would have also required the CDC to create a hotline staffed with trained interpreters who can share information on the virus and vaccines to people with limited English proficiency.

Aside from these direct health inequities, broader social inequities became a growing effect of the COVID crisis. Amid school closures, families grappled with layered issues of virus risk, income loss, grief, food insecurity, unhealthy environments, learning delay, isolation, lack of information, and more. Crumbling or absent public systems risk a new white flight and entrenched segregation for years to come.

== Event cancellations ==
=== Early 2020 ===
Technology conferences such as Apple Inc.'s Worldwide Developers Conference (WWDC), E3 2020, Facebook F8, Google I/O and Cloud Next, and Microsoft's MVP Summit were either canceled or replaced with internet streaming events.

On February 21, Verizon pulled out of an RSA conference, along with AT&T and IBM. On February 29, the American Physical Society cancelled its annual March Meeting, scheduled for March 2–6 in Denver, Colorado, even though many of the more than 11,000 physicist participants had already arrived and participated in the day's pre-conference events. On March 6, the annual South by Southwest (SXSW) conference in Austin, Texas, was cancelled after the city government declared a "local disaster" and ordered conferences to shut down for the first time in 34 years. The cancellation was not covered by insurance. In 2019, 73,716 people attended the conferences and festivals, directly spending $200 million and ultimately boosting the local economy by $356 million, or four percent of the annual revenue of the region's hospitality and tourism economic sectors.

On March 12, a Post Malone concert at Denver's Pepsi Center proceeded as scheduled, drawing a sellout-crowd of 20,000, likely the largest enclosed gathering in the U.S. before widespread lockdowns.

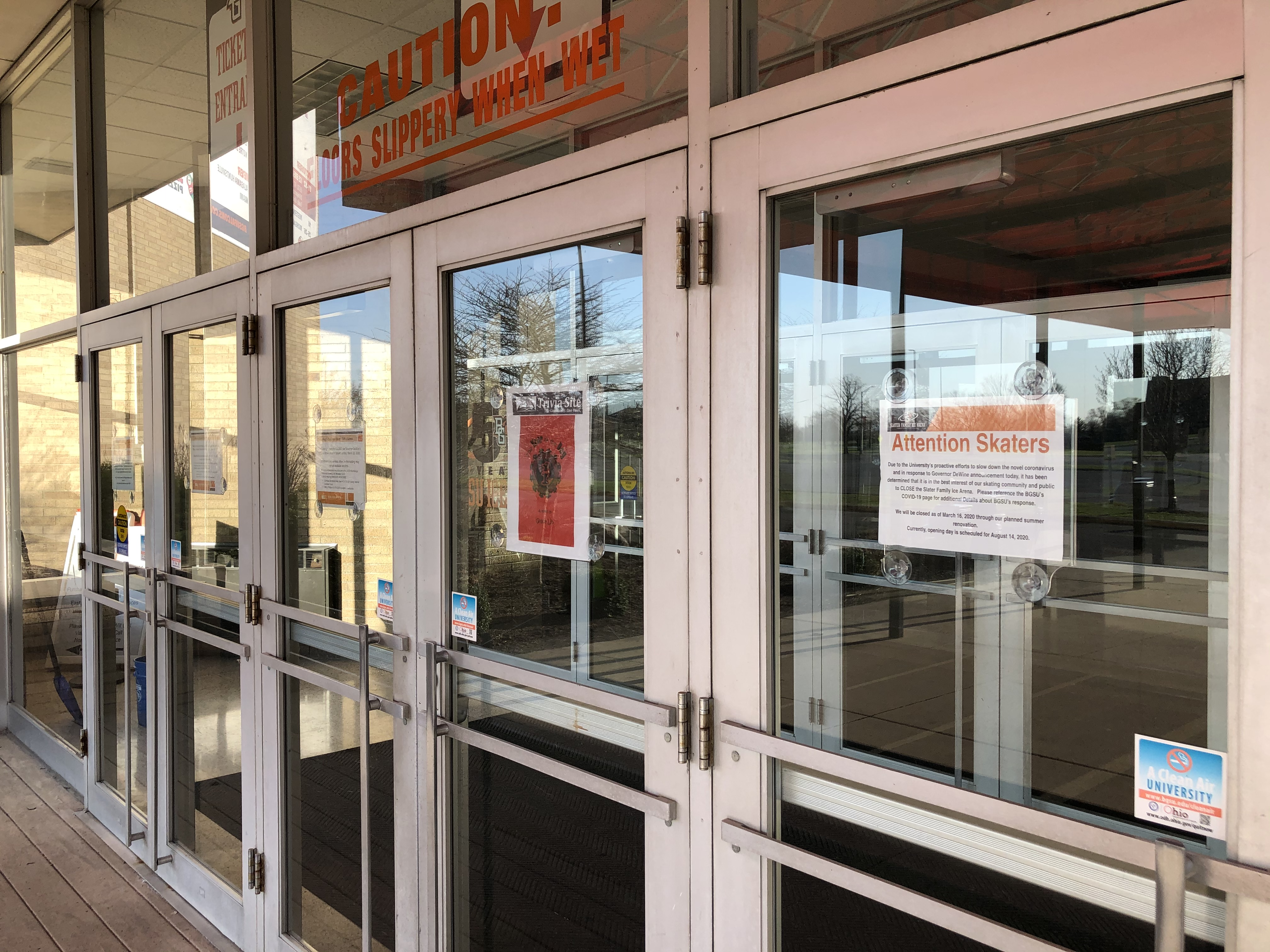
Ice arena closed for performances

After the cancellations of the Ultra Music Festival in Miami and SXSW in Austin, speculation began to grow about the Coachella festival set to begin on April 10 in the desert in Indio, California. The annual festival, which attracted some 125,000 people over two consecutive weekends, was insured only in the event of a force majeure cancellation such as one ordered by local or state government officials. Estimates on an insurance payout range from $150 million to $200 million.

=== Ongoing ===
Throughout 2020, live music events continued to be scheduled and then canceled in reaction to COVID-19 surges, putting the music industry in crisis. In its recent third-quarter earnings report for 2020, Live Nation Entertainment reported a 95% revenue drop industry-wide. According to a report by research and trade publication named Pollstar, the music industry could lose up to $9 billion in 2020. Working musicians struggled to get by and venues continue to close. In the era of streaming services, working musicians rely heavily on touring for income.

Ticketmaster experimented with viable options when reopening live music events such as requiring proof of a Coronavirus vaccine or a negative Coronavirus test. The framework plan could work through the Ticketmaster digital app and third-party health companies and customers would be required to get tested approximately 24 to 72 hours before a concert. When presenting a digital ticket, both the confirmation of ticket purchase and proof of a negative test result will be shown before entering the event. No medical records were said to be stored from each participant but serve as a method of proof that the individual is safe to attend the event.

In Germany, researchers conducted a study on indoor concert events to test the safety risks of virus transmission. Analysis of an indoor concert staged by scientists in August suggests that the impact of such events on the spread of the coronavirus was "low to very low" as long as organizers ensure adequate ventilation, strict hygiene protocols, and limited capacity, according to the German researchers who conducted the study.

== Media ==
=== Publishing ===
The scale of the COVID-19 outbreak prompted several major publishers to temporarily disable their paywalls on related articles, including Bloomberg News, The Atlantic, The New York Times, The Wall Street Journal, and The Seattle Times. Many local newspapers were already severely struggling before the crisis. Several alt weekly newspapers in affected metropolitan areas, including The Stranger in Seattle and Austin Chronicle, announced layoffs and funding drives due to lost revenue. Advertisements concerning public events and venues accounted for a majority of revenue for alt-weekly newspapers, which was disrupted by the cancellation of large public gatherings. Online advertisements also dropped to avoid running ads next to coronavirus coverage.

=== Film ===
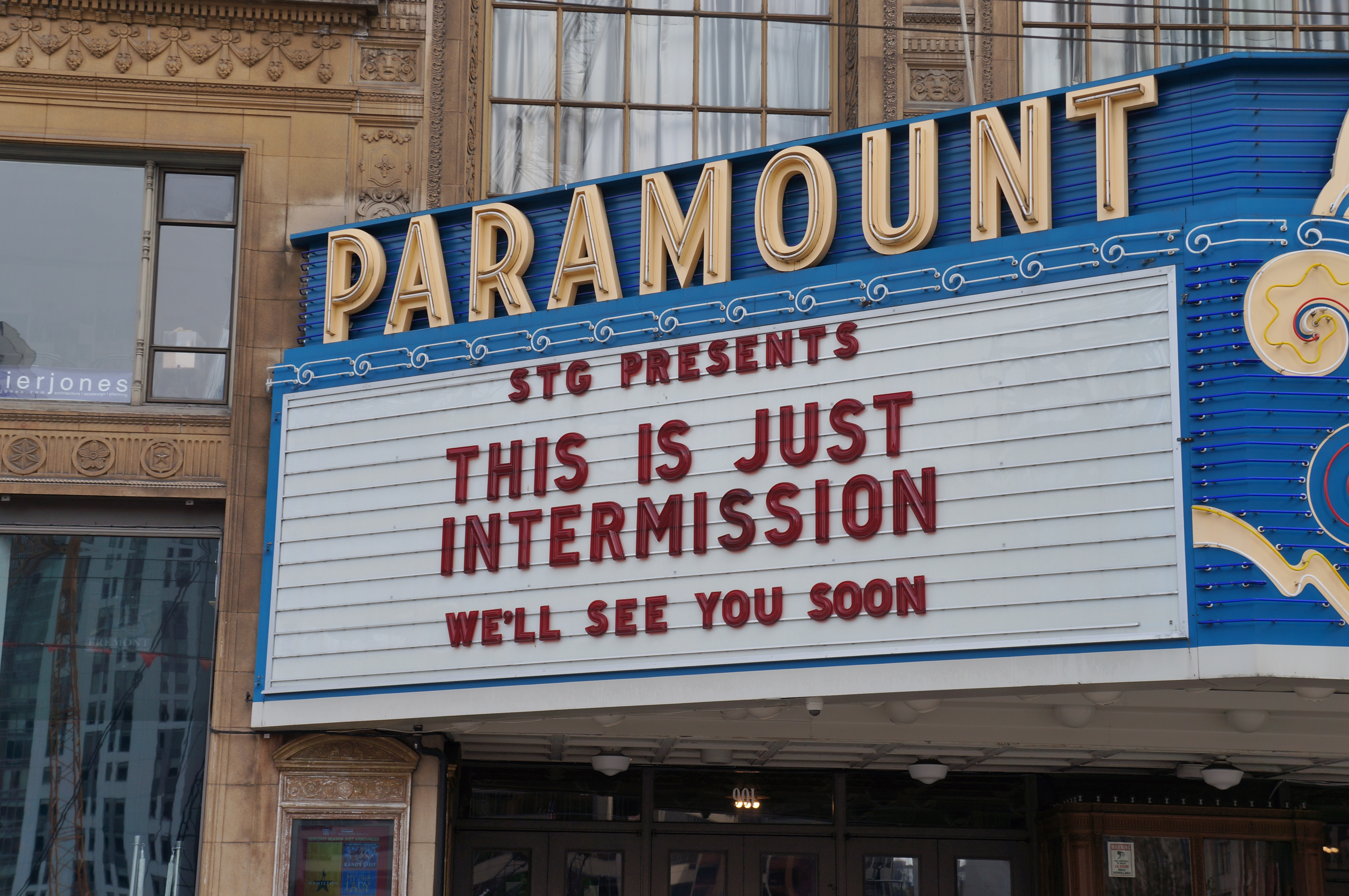
Theater in Seattle announcing, "This Is Just Intermission. We'll See You Soon", May 2020

Most U.S. cinema chains, were allowed to continue operating, reduced the seating capacity of each show time by half to minimize the risk of spreading the virus between patrons. Audience limits, as well as mandatory and voluntary closure of cinemas in some areas, led to the lowest total North American box office sales since October 1998. On March 16, numerous theater chains temporarily closed their locations nationwide. A number of Hollywood film companies suspended production and delayed the release of films.

=== Television ===
Many television programs began to suspend production in mid-March due to the pandemic. News programs and most talk shows largely remained on-air, but with changes to their production to incorporate coverage of the pandemic, and adhere to CDC guidelines on physical distancing and the encouragement of remote work. Quarantine and remote work efforts, as well as interest in updates on the pandemic, resulted in a larger potential audience for television broadcasters—especially for news programs and news channels. Nielsen estimated that by March 11 television usage had increased by 22% week-over-week. It was expected that streaming services would see an increase in usage, while potential economic downturns associated with the pandemic could accelerate the market trend of cord cutting.

The Hollywood Reporter observed gains in average viewership for some programs between March 9 and April 2, with the top increases including The Blacklist (31.2% gain in average audience since March 9), and 20/20 (30.8%). These effects were also seen on syndicated programs, and the Big Three networks' daytime soap operas. WarnerMedia reported that HBO Now saw a spike in usage, and the most viewed titles included documentary Ebola: The Doctors' Story and the 2011 film Contagion for their resonance with the pandemic.

== Sports ==
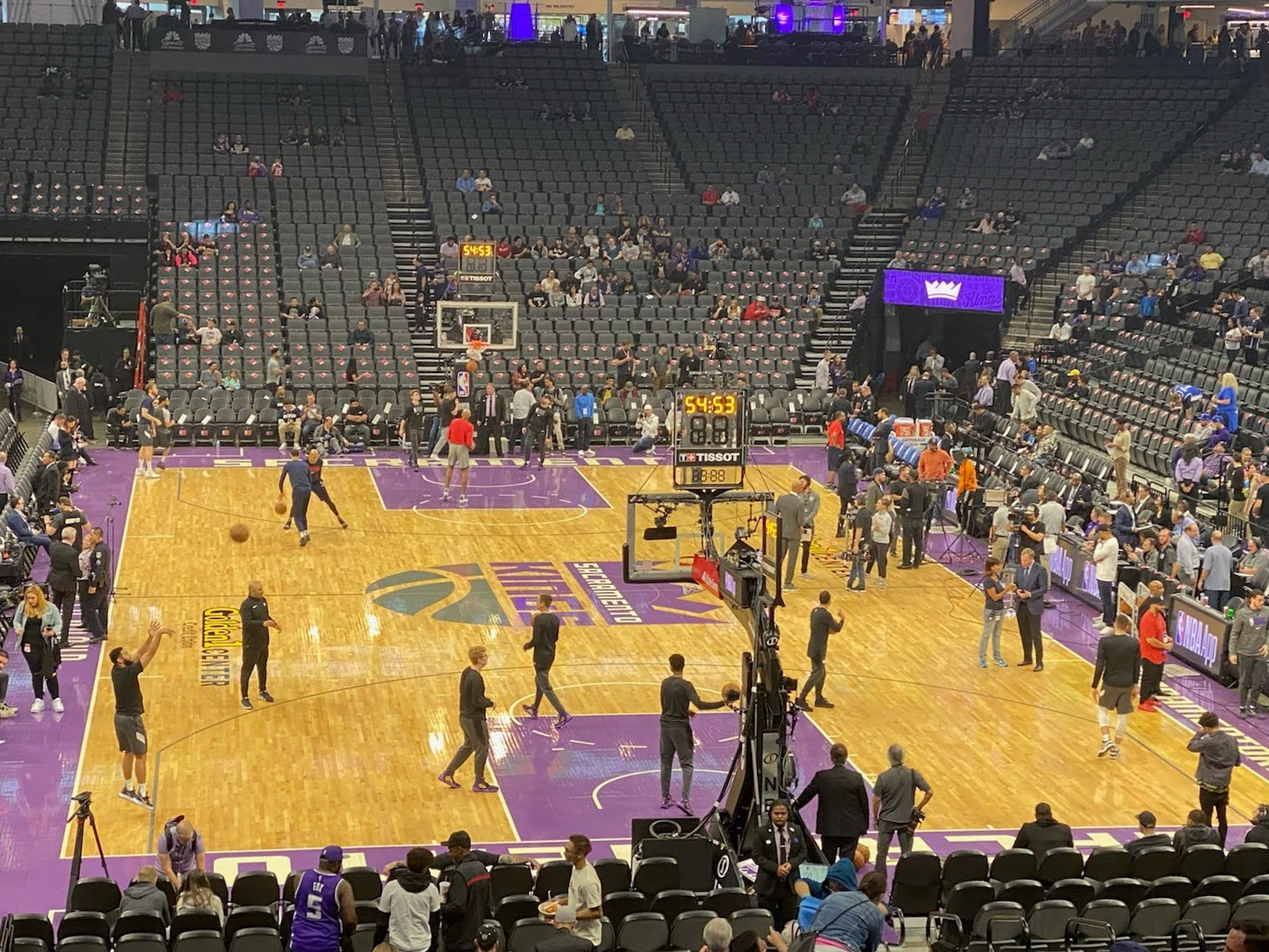
The NBA was the first major sports league to suspend operations, including clearing out this March 11 game between the New Orleans Pelicans and Sacramento Kings.

The 2020 BNP Paribas Open tennis tournament at Indian Wells was postponed on March 8, 2020, marking the first major U.S. sports cancellation attributed to the outbreak.

In compliance with restrictions on large gatherings, the Columbus Blue Jackets (NHL), Golden State Warriors (NBA), and San Jose Sharks (NHL) announced their intent to play home games behind closed doors, with no spectators and only essential staff present. These proposals were soon rendered moot, when suspension of games for various time periods were announced by almost all professional sports leagues in the United States on March 11 onward, including the National Basketball Association (which had a player announced as having tested positive), National Hockey League, Major League Baseball, Major League Soccer, Major League Rugby, and National Volleyball Association.

College athletics competitions were similarly cancelled by schools, conferences and the National Collegiate Athletic Association (NCAA)—which cancelled all remaining championships for the academic year on March 12. This also resulted in the first-ever cancellation of the NCAA's popular "March Madness" men's basketball tournament (which had been scheduled to begin the following week) in its 81-year history.

The National Football League (NFL) considered playing with helmets with installed filters.

== Health insurance ==
Millions of Americans lost their health insurance when they lost their jobs. The Independent reported that Families USA "found that the spike in uninsured Americans – adding to an estimated 84 million people who are already uninsured or underinsured – is 39 percent higher than any previous annual increase, including the most recent surge at the height of the recession between 2008 and 2009 when nearly 4 million non-elderly Americans lost insurance."

The Biden administration passed The No Surprises Act, which took effect on January 1, 2022. This act "protects insured patients from receiving unexpected bills for healthcare they've received from out-of-network hospitals, doctors or providers they did not select."

== Religious services ==
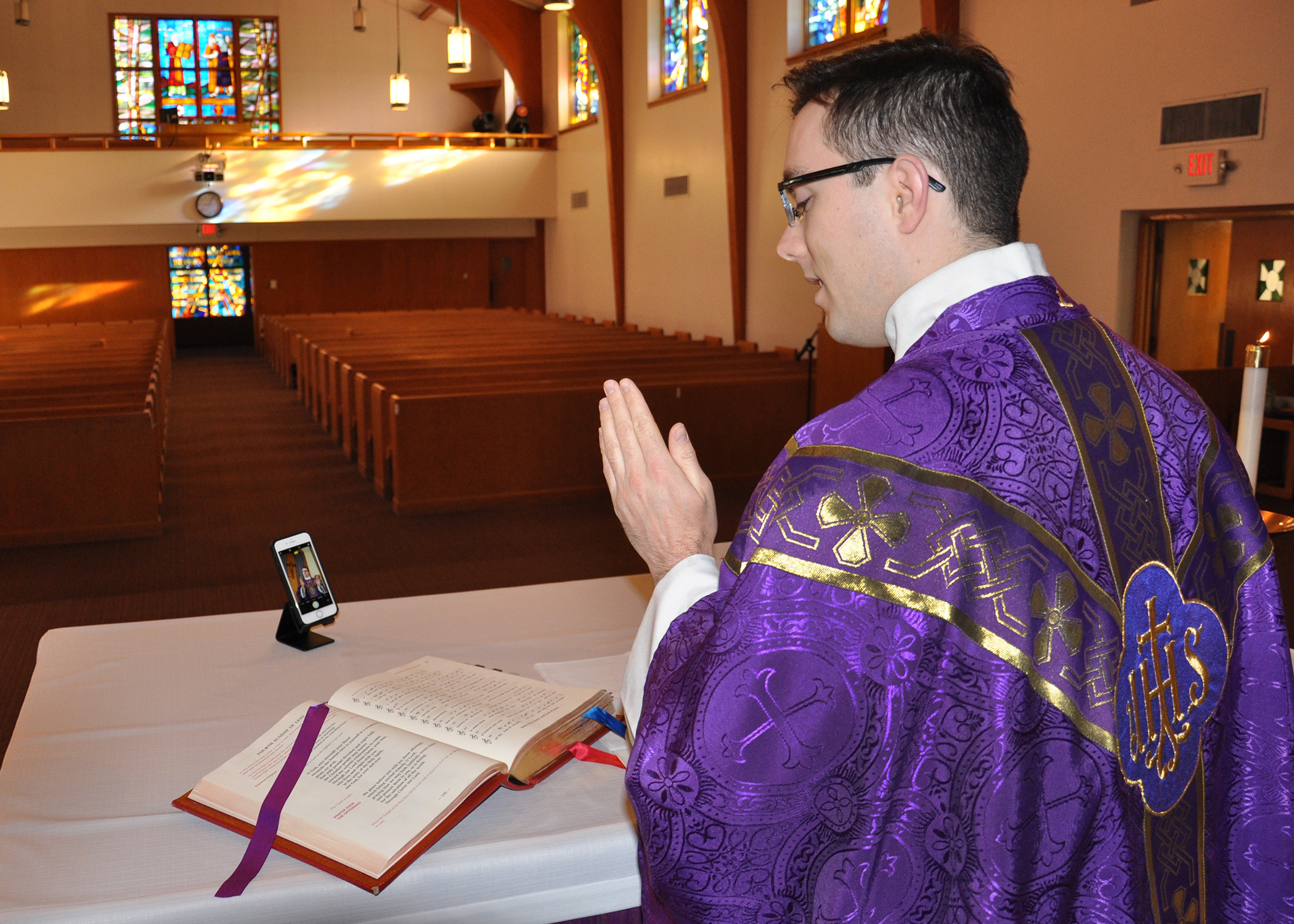
A chaplain at Offutt Air Force Base, Nebraska conducts a virtual mass via phone.

Amidst the COVID-19 pandemic, many churches, mosques, synagogues and temples suspended religious services to avoid spreading the disease. Some religious organizations offered radio, television and online services, while others offered drive-in services. Despite the pandemic, many American religious organizations continue to operate their food pantries. Churches offered bags filled with food and toilet paper rolls for families in need. Many mosques closed for prayers but continued to run their food banks.

The National Cathedral of the United States, which belongs to the Episcopal Church, donated more than 5,000 N95 surgical masks to hospitals of Washington D.C., which were in shortage during the COVID-19 pandemic. Other churches, such as the Church of the Highlands, an evangelical Christian megachurch, offered free COVID-19 tests in their parking lots.

Some state orders against large gatherings, such as in Ohio and New York, specifically exempted religious organizations. Colorado Springs Fellowship Church insisted it had a constitutional right to defy a state closure order. Evangelical college Liberty University of Lynchburg, Virginia, moved its classes online but called its 5,000 back to campus despite Governor Ralph Northam's order to close all non-essential businesses. On March 13, 2020, Bishop Elaine JW Stanovsky of the Pacific Northwest Annual Conference of the United Methodist Church issued a statement that would be updated no later than the start of Holy Week, which directed "the local churches of any size and other ministries in the states of Alaska, Idaho, Oregon and Washington to suspend in-person worship and other gatherings of more than 10 people for the next two weeks."

In the state of Kansas, the Democratic governor, Laura Kelly responded to a prime source of spread of the disease by banning religious services attended by more than 10 people. In April, Texas churches were meeting while following social distancing guidelines after Texas Governor Greg Abbott joined more than 30 governors who had already deemed religious services "essential". A federal appeals court ruled that Kentucky churches must be permitted to hold drive-in church services.

== Opioid crisis ==
In the one-year period from April 2020–April 2021, over 100,000 people in the United States died of overdoses (of all types of drugs), compared with 78,000 fatal overdoses in the same period the previous year. One reason may be that, as early as April 2020, social distancing measures posed difficulties for addiction recovery services.

Looking at the calendar year 2020, over 93,000 people in the United States died of drug overdoses, an all-time high, and a large increase over the previous year's 70,000 drug overdose deaths.

Before the pandemic, opioid overdose deaths had appeared to begin a decline; in 2018, they had dropped 4 percent from the previous year, the first drop in the statistic in nearly 30 years. The federal government's top addiction and mental health experts warned in April 2020 that opioid crisis efforts were being "sidelined" by the government's response to COVID-19. The director of the National Institute on Drug Abuse, Nora Volkow, said, "I think we're going to see deaths climb again. We can't afford to focus solely on Covid."

== Families ==
=== Impact on adolescents ===
In 2022, the CDC reported that adolescents (high school students) were significantly impacted by "adverse childhood experiences" which took place during the pandemic, in particular transition to poor mental health and suicide attempts. Adverse childhood experiences, or ACEs, included "abuse, neglect, witnessing violence, or having a family member attempt or die by suicide" and were experienced by about three-quarters of adolescents in the United States. Multiple experienced ACEs were reported to be cumulative in their impact.

=== Divorce ===
In most states, there appeared to be more divorces in mid-2021 than in mid-2020, according to divorce lawyers who spoke to the New York Times. This may have been due to backlogged demand for legal services and other aspects of divorce that could not be carried out during 2020 quarantines.

=== Foster care ===
The pandemic affected not only the divorce rates in the United States, but also the youth in the foster care system. Studies have shown that children in the foster care system were more affected by school closures than children from traditional households. For example, students in foster care were "more than twice as likely as students overall to be chronically absent from school during the 2018-19 school year." In addition, students in foster care were "more than four times as likely as students overall to have been suspended one or more times during the year." Foster children often lack the technological equipment and support to participate in distance learning. According to a recent survey of Transitional Housing Placement for Non-Minor Dependents (THPNMD) programs, a vast majority of providers "reported serving foster youth, including some in high school, who did not have a laptop, internet, or access to tutoring during school closures." On top of the anxiety and mental health issues that were incurred during the pandemic, students in foster care also have to deal with their own traumas of abuse and neglect. Without the support that schools provided on an in-person basis, many children in foster care found themselves in a situation where they could not fully engage in the new learning environments and overcome performance deficits that stemmed from their past and present situation. This ultimately affected their performance in education.

The pandemic made the lives of many foster parents much harder when navigating family courts and social services. Many child welfare authorities became concerned about the possibility of higher rates of abuse and neglect after schools were shut down and both kids and parents were secluded at home. Data showed the complete opposite: there were stark declines in reported child abuse. However, child care services in these states interpreted the data by believing that there was actually rampant, undetected abuse, and acted accordingly to this belief. Advocates for parents in marginalized communities contended that "the alarms raised about hidden abuse reflect ingrained biases in child protective services, too eager to remove kids from their homes and drag parents to court in the name of saving children." According to 2019 federal data, investigations could not validate "the reports for more than 80 percent of children examined by child protective services." On the other hand, it was found that the overwhelming majority of substantiated cases did not involve abuse: instead, it involved neglect that is a result of economic hardship. Child protective services were flooded with countless of baseless reports, making it harder to find cases that are truly relevant and act appropriately.

About 20,000 young adults age out of foster care each year in the United States. Before the pandemic, they were likely to experience significant life challenges compared to their peers who live in traditional homes. The coronavirus exacerbated their hardships. A national poll conducted by FosterClub found that 25% of 18 to 24 year-olds in the foster care system were "experiencing heightened food insecurity." Furthermore, many transition-age foster care individuals also had to deal with losing their jobs because of the pandemic.

== Rural communities ==
In May 2020, daily infection and death rates were still higher per capita in densely populated cities and suburbs but were increasing faster in rural counties. Of the 25 counties with the highest per capita case rates in May, 20 had a meatpacking plant or prison where the virus was able to spread unchecked. By July, rural communities with populations less than 50,000 had some of the highest rates of new daily cases per capita. Factors contributing to the spread of COVID-19 in these communities were high rates of obesity, the relatively high numbers of elderly residents, immigrant laborers with shared living conditions and meat-processing plants.
