= Debra K. Johnson Rehabilitation Center =

Prison for women in Nashville, Tennessee

Coordinates: 36°11′36″N 86°51′33″W

- Interactive map of Debra K. Johnson Rehabilitation Center
- Location: 3881 Stewarts Lane Nashville, Tennessee
- Status: Open
- Security class: Mixed
- Capacity: 817
- Opened: 1966
- Managed by: Tennessee Department of Corrections
- Warden: Taylor Kapusta

The Debra K. Johnson Rehabilitation Center, formerly the Tennessee Prison for Women, is a Tennessee Department of Correction prison for women located in Nashville, Tennessee. It is named after Debra Johnson, a senior staff member at West Tennessee State Penitentiary, who was murdered by an absconding inmate in 2019.

DJRC, the state's primary women's correctional facility, houses women of all custody levels. The prison serves as the state's new female prisoner intake and classification center, and it also houses all female death row inmates. There is currently only one female on death row in the state of Tennessee, Christa Pike. Her execution was scheduled for September 30 2026, however, the executive failed following 2 lethal injections. Following this, Tennessee Governor Bill Lee paused all executions for 2026. Women on death row are not housed in special death row units because few women go on death row. The prison first opened in 1966 and has a capacity of 817 inmates. The state classifies the prison as a maximum security institution.

== Notable inmates ==
- Vanessa Coleman — Convicted of the facilitation of aggravated kidnapping, facilitation of rape, and the facilitation of the murder of Channon Christian.
- Christa Pike — is the youngest woman to be sentenced to death in the United States during the post-Furman period. She was 20 when convicted of the torture murder of a classmate she committed at age 18. She is currently the only woman in Tennessee awaiting execution.
- Natasha Cornett — is an American criminal currently serving a sentence of life without parole at the Tennessee Prison for Women in Nashville for her involvement in the Lillelid murders.
- Jennifer Hyatte — a former prison nurse who fatally shot a corrections officer while trying to break her husband, George Hyatte out of custody. Less than 36 hours after their escape, they were arrested and then charged with first degree murder. Both were convicted and sentenced to life in prison with no possibility of parole.
- Pamela Rogers Turner — Teacher and child rapist.

== Former inmates ==
- Cyntoia Brown — a juvenile forced into prostitution, she murdered Johnny Michael Allen when she was 16 and was initially to have served a minimum of 51 years, but received clemency after a public campaign. Released August 7, 2019.
