= Murders of Channon Christian and Christopher Newsom =

2007 carjacking, rape, and murder of a couple in Knoxville, Tennessee

Coordinates: 35.99113°N 83.907514°W

- Undated photo of Christian and Newsom
- Location: Knoxville, Tennessee, U.S.
- Date: January 6, 2007; 19 years ago
- Attack type: Murder, rape, torture, kidnapping, carjacking
- Weapon: Guns
- Victims: Channon Christian; Christopher Newsom
- Perpetrators: Letalvis D. Cobbins; Lemaricus D. Davidson; George Thomas; Eric Boyd; Vanessa Coleman

Channon Gail Christian, aged 21, and Hugh Christopher Newsom Jr., aged 23, were a couple from Knoxville, Tennessee, United States. They were kidnapped on the evening of January 6, 2007, when Christian's vehicle was carjacked. The couple were taken to a rental house. Both of them were raped, tortured, and murdered. Four black men and one black woman were arrested, charged, and convicted in the case. In 2007, a grand jury indicted Letalvis Darnell Cobbins, Lemaricus Devall Davidson, George Geovonni Thomas, and Vanessa Lynn Coleman on counts of kidnapping, robbery, rape, and murder. Also in 2007, Eric DeWayne Boyd was indicted by a federal grand jury of being an accessory to a carjacking, resulting in serious bodily injury to another person and misprision of a felony. In 2018, Boyd was indicted on state-level charges of kidnapping, robbery, rape, and murder.

Four of the five defendants (Eric Boyd, Letalvis Cobbins, Lemaricus Davidson, and George Thomas) had multiple prior felony convictions. After a jury trial, Davidson was convicted and sentenced to death by lethal injection. Cobbins and Thomas were convicted and sentenced to life in prison without parole. Vanessa Coleman was convicted of facilitating the crimes and sentenced to 53 years. Eric Boyd was convicted at the federal level and sentenced to 18 years in federal prison for being an accessory after the fact to carjacking. He was convicted on state level charges over a decade later in 2019.

All of the state convictions were initially set aside because of misconduct by the presiding judge Richard Baumgartner, who has since been disbarred. Retrials were originally slated for the summer and fall of 2012. The orders for retrials of Davidson and Cobbins were subsequently overturned by the Tennessee State Supreme Court, and their convictions and sentences stand. The Coleman and Thomas retrials resulted in convictions, but with a reduced sentence for Coleman and the same sentence for Thomas.

Controversy arose due to differing interpretations regarding the media's coverage of the murders. Many people believed that the crimes were ignored because the victims were white while the perpetrators were black. Others, including journalists, disagreed with this assertion. Efforts have been made to remember and honor Christian and Newsom. In 2014, new laws named after the victims were introduced in Tennessee. Both victims have also had memorials and scholarships named after them.

== Victims ==
Channon Gail Christian (born April 29, 1985, in Nacogdoches, Texas) moved from Louisiana to Tennessee with her family in 1997. She was a graduate of Farragut High School (2003), and a senior majoring in sociology at the University of Tennessee in Knoxville. She planned on graduating in December 2007. Channon was 21 years old when she was murdered.

Hugh Christopher "Chris" Newsom Jr. (born September 21, 1983, in Knoxville) was a former baseball player for the Halls High School Red Devils, graduating in 2002. After high school, he attended Pellissippi State Technical Community College and became a carpenter. Newsom was 23 years old when he was murdered.

== Murders ==
On Saturday, January 6, 2007, Christian and Newsom planned to go for dinner together and attend a friend's party. That afternoon, Christian went to a friend's apartment to get ready. At around 8:00 pm, Christian's friend went to the party, and Christian stayed behind and waited for Newsom to pick her up. Newsom arrived, and he and Christian went to the apartment complex parking lot.

The assailants observed Christian and Newsom standing close to Christian's vehicle in an embrace. They then decided to attack the couple. Both were forced into the backseat of Christian's SUV at gunpoint, had their hands tied behind their backs, and were taken to Davidson's house at 2316 Chipman Street.

Both Christian and Newsom were raped. Newsom is believed to have been raped inside Davidson's house. According to the testimony of the Knox County Acting Medical Examiner, Newsom was sodomized with an object and raped by at least one of the perpetrators. He was then taken to a set of railroad tracks where he was forced to walk barefoot to the location where he was murdered. Prosecutors believe a mangled dog leash found on a hillside leading up to the railroad tracks was used to force Newsom to walk to his death. When Newsom was murdered, his hands were bound behind his back, and his feet were bound together. He was blindfolded with a bandana and gagged with a sock. He wore only a shirt and underwear. Newsom was shot in his neck and the back. Newsom survived this shooting initially, but later was shot again in the head. The fatal shot was fired with the gun's muzzle against his head above his right ear, and it severed his brain stem. After killing Newsom, the assailants wrapped him in a comforter, poured gasoline on him, and set his body on fire.

Christian was held prisoner inside Davidson's house, mostly in the north bedroom. Prosecutors believe that Coleman held Christian captive while the male offenders were murdering Newsom. After murdering Newsom, the assailants returned to Davidson's house where they beat and repeatedly raped Christian. The medical examiner testified that Christian died after hours of sexual torture, sustaining severe head injuries and suffering severe injuries to her vagina, anus, and mouth due to sexual assaults. Her injuries were consistent with being raped with an object. According to the medical examiner, the sexual attack Christian endured was "extreme" and "much more than a simple sexual assault." Prosecutors believe that Christian was tied to a chair and orally raped by Davidson and Cobbins. She was also beaten, kicked in her groin, and beaten on the head. Christian suffered extensive hemorrhaging to her head and groin. Additionally, Christian suffered bruises and carpet burns on much of her body. According to Davidson's confession, during Christian's captivity, she said she "didn't want to die."

While Christian was still alive, in order to remove DNA evidence, Christian's attackers poured bleach down her throat and scrubbed her body, including her bleeding and battered genital area, with bleach. Christian was bound in a hog-tied fashion with curtains and strips of bedding. Her face was tightly covered with a small trash bag, and her body was stashed in five large trash bags. Christian, who was naked except for her camisole and sweater, was tied in a fetal position, placed inside a residential waste disposal unit inside the kitchen of the home, and covered with sheets. The medical examiner testified at trial that there was evidence that Christian slowly suffocated to death. Christian died between the afternoon of January 7 and the afternoon of January 8. As Christian was suffocating to death, Davidson left to spend time with his girlfriend and gave her Christian's personal items. Davidson also used Newsom's cellphone and was seen wearing Newsom's shoes.

== Investigation ==
After Christian and Newsom did not show up at the party, the couple's friends began calling and texting them and received no response. Later, at around 11:00 pm, two of Newsom's friends went to the apartment where the couple had been kidnapped and found Newsom's truck in the parking lot. They were unable to locate Christian's SUV.

A witness, who worked as a driver for Waste Connections, arrived at work on Chipman Street at around 12:30 am on January 7. He noticed that the lights in 2316 Chipman Street were on and that the house seemed busy for the time of night. He saw a 4Runner in front of the house with its porch lights on. The witness later observed the 4Runner drive slowly by him. The car slowed down for about 20 seconds as if the occupants were "checking him out". He saw four black men in the car. Another witness who lived around one block from 2316 Chipman Street heard three pops from the direction of the train tracks at about 1:45 am.

Newsom's body was discovered near a set of nearby railroad tracks on January 7 at 12:20 pm by a Norfolk Southern Railroad employee. Though there was semen detected on Newsom's body, the DNA had been destroyed by the fire. A comforter was wrapped around Newsom's body, and a sweatshirt was wrapped around his head. His bare and muddy feet indicated that he had walked barefoot to the area where he was killed.

On January 7, Christian failed to answer calls from her mother and friend. Christian also did not attend work. The couple's friends and families tried to find them, checking local hospitals and filing missing person reports. Christian's parents requested help from law enforcement but were told that they would have to search themselves. They then sought help from Christian's mobile phone provider and learned that her phone had last pinged at a Cherry Street phone tower. Christian and Newsom's families and friends searched the Cherry Street area and found Christian's abandoned Toyota 4Runner between 1:30 am and 2:00 am on Monday, January 8.

Several items were missing from Christian's vehicle, including a teddy bear and photographs Christian kept there and her phone charger and iPod. The front seats were pushed back, and Christian could not have reached the pedals. The floorboard was covered with mud, inconsistent with how Christian maintained her vehicle. Stickers Christian kept on the outside windows had been removed. Inside the vehicle was a pack of Newport cigarettes, even though neither Christian nor Newsom smoked them. Police also recovered an envelope from the vehicle that yielded fingerprint evidence leading them to LeMaricus Davidson of 2316 Chipman Street, an address two blocks from Christian's car.

When police went to 2316 Chipman Street on January 9, they found the house unoccupied and Christian's body in a trash can in the kitchen. Christian's body was stashed in five large trash bags. The bags had Davidson's prints. Davidson's prints were also found on a box of garbage bags. Davidson's semen was found in Christian's vagina and anus while Cobbins' semen was found in her mouth. Also inside the house were several items that belonged to Christian and Newsom, including Christian's purse, clothing she had in her vehicle, Christian's shoes, camera, photographs (which were ripped and burned), and iPod and Newsom's baseball caps and driver's license. Several of the victims' belongings had Davidson's prints. The items from Christian's SUV were shoved into trash bags. In addition to the semen found on Christian's body, Davidson's semen was found on Christian's jeans while Cobbins' semen was found on her camisole, sweater, and jeans. Shell casings found at Davidson's house matched the bullets used to kill Newsom.

After finding Christian's body and discovering the presence of Davidson's semen on her clothing and in her body cavities, police undertook a manhunt for Davidson. After receiving phone calls between Davidson and Boyd, they asked Boyd for information regarding Davidson's whereabouts. Boyd directed them to a vacant house. On January 11, Davidson was arrested in the vacant house. There, police found Newsom's size 9½ Nike Shox athletic shoes and a .22-caliber High Standard revolver. Davidson was then interrogated about the murders. He told five different stories, first claiming that he had left the house on Friday and knew nothing of the crimes. He later told police that Cobbins and Thomas arrived at his house at around 10:00 pm on Friday or Saturday and informed him that they had carjacked some people who were in the vehicle. Davidson claimed he saw the victims tied up in the back seat, did not want any part of it, and left to smoke marijuana. He said he returned to the house about 20 minutes later to find Christian, who told him she did not want to die. He then used Christian's vehicle to deal drugs and wiped it clean. Davidson claimed that he did not go past the living room and that he never raped Christian.

On January 11, Thomas, Cobbins, and Coleman were arrested in Lebanon, Kentucky. Police seized a computer on which Thomas and Cobbins had been viewing news coverage of the murders. Police also seized a purse that contained several of Christian's belongings, including her cosmetic bag and change purse. Additionally, police found Christian's overnight bag. Cobbins gave a statement to investigators claiming that he, Davidson, and Boyd drove to an apartment complex for someone to meet a girl. When they arrived, they saw an SUV with a female in the driver's seat. She was speaking to a male. Davidson and Boyd "basically carjacked them" and ordered Cobbins to drive back to Chipman Street. According to Cobbins, Davidson took the woman into a bedroom once they arrived at the residence, and Boyd drove away with the man. Boyd later returned without the male victim. Cobbins denied having any sexual intercourse with the female victim. Coleman admitted to being present in the house during the crimes, claiming that she had been held hostage by the other defendants.

A journal was recovered after the arrests of Thomas, Cobbins, and Coleman. An entry from January 9 read:

Last night was one of a kind. We stayed w/a crackhead that is cool as hell. It snowed a lil bit but it's already melted. Let's talk about adventures! I had one HELL OF AN ADVENTURE since I've been in the big T.N. [I]t's a crazy world these days! But I love the fun adventures [and] lessons that I've learned. It[']s going to be a long interesting year!

A forensic document examiner verified that the handwriting in the entry matched Coleman's handwriting.

== Perpetrators ==
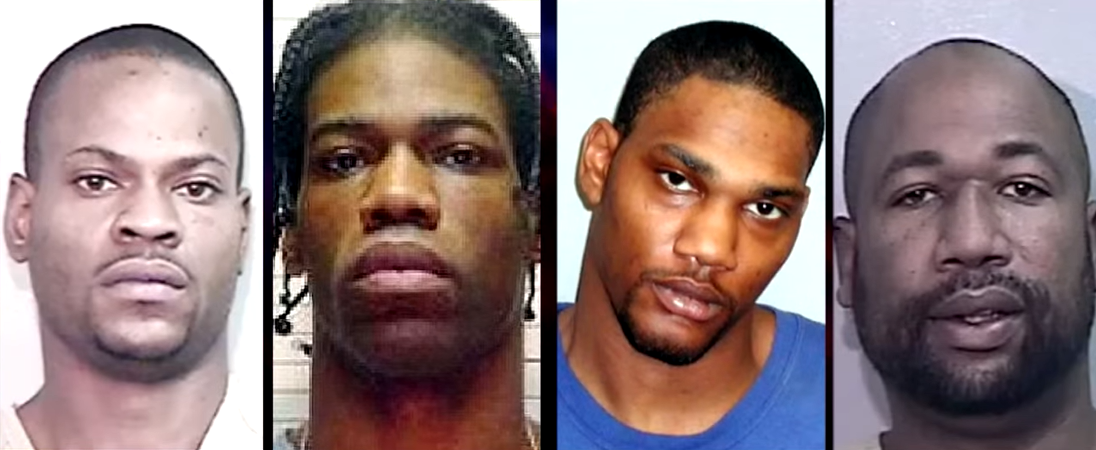
The four men who committed the crime. From left to right, Davidson, Cobbins, Thomas, and Boyd

- George Geovonni "Detroit" Thomas (born January 23, 1983) faced a total of 46 charges. Thomas was indicted on 16 counts of felony murder related to the rape, robbery, and kidnapping committed against Christian and Newsom, two counts of premeditated murder, two counts of especially aggravated robbery, four counts of especially aggravated kidnapping, 20 counts of aggravated rape, and two counts of theft.
- Letalvis Darnell "Rome" Cobbins (born December 20, 1982) faced the same 46 charges as Thomas. He was also charged with assaulting a correctional officer while incarcerated pending trial. In 2003, Cobbins had been convicted of third-degree attempted robbery in New York. He and Davidson are half-brothers.
- Lemaricus Devall "Slim" Davidson (born June 13, 1981) faced the same 46 charges as Thomas. Davidson was originally from Memphis and had just, in August 2006, completed a five-year sentence in Tennessee on a previous felony conviction for carjacking and aggravated robbery. Davidson was also indicted for a second robbery committed at a Pizza Hut one day after the murders.
- Vanessa Lynn Coleman (born June 29, 1988) was arrested by the Lebanon Police Department in her home town of Lebanon, Kentucky. She faced 40 Tennessee state charges. Coleman was indicted on 12 counts of felony murder related to rape, robbery, kidnapping, and theft, one count of premeditated murder (of Christian only), one count of especially aggravated robbery (of Newsom only), four counts of especially aggravated kidnapping, 20 counts of aggravated rape, and two counts of theft.
- Eric DeWayne "E" Boyd (born February 18, 1972) was arrested in connection with the fatal carjacking. He was not indicted by the Knox County grand jury in 2007 but was indicted by a federal grand jury in the Eastern District of Tennessee on August 23, 2007. The grand jury returned a superseding indictment charging him with being an accessory to a carjacking, resulting in serious bodily injury to another person and misprision of a felony. Later, Boyd was accused by Thomas and Cobbins of the rape and murder of Newsom and a search warrant was obtained for his DNA. He was tried on state charges more than a decade later in 2019.

== First trials ==
The four suspects indicted in Knox County were scheduled to be tried separately at trials between May and August 2008. In February 2008, the trial dates for the subjects indicted in Knox County were moved to 2009. Judge Richard Baumgartner allowed Thomas and Cobbins to be tried by juries from Davidson County (which includes Nashville). The attorneys for Thomas filed a motion for a speedy trial, arguing there was no forensic link between their client and the crime scene. Thomas was granted the motion and was scheduled to go on trial on August 11, 2008. Baumgartner ruled that Thomas' phone calls from the jailhouse to his acquaintances were admissible as evidence.

District Attorney Randy Nichols announced that the state would seek the death penalty for both Cobbins (the first to go to trial) and Coleman if convicted.

Davidson was also indicted for the Pizza Hut robbery committed the day after the murders. The publicity against the accused led the defense to argue that a change of venue was required in order to ensure a fair trial. The state argued that an impartial jury could be found during voir dire, and the presiding judge subsequently denied the motion as "premature". Judge Baumgartner threatened to ban the Newsom family from the courtroom after they called Davidson's attorney, Doug Trant, a "jerk".

=== Verdicts from the first trials ===
On April 16, 2008, Eric Boyd was found guilty in federal court of being an accessory to a fatal carjacking and of failing to report the location of a known fugitive. Boyd was the first to go to trial, the only suspect not charged with murder. He was sentenced to a maximum of 18 years in federal prison. He is incarcerated at the Federal Correctional Institution, Yazoo City, a low-security federal prison in Yazoo County, Mississippi.

On August 25, 2009, Letalvis Cobbins was found guilty of the murders of Channon Christian and Christopher Newsom. Cobbins faced the possibility of the death penalty because he was convicted of first-degree felony murder in the case of Christian. He was found guilty of facilitating the murder of Newsom, but he was acquitted of Newsom's rape. On August 26, Cobbins was sentenced to life without parole.

On October 28, 2009, Lemaricus Davidson was found guilty. The jurors unanimously found Davidson should receive the death penalty on the four capital charges, two first-degree felony murder charges, and the two premeditated first-degree murders of Christian and Newsom. In June 2010, Davidson was sentenced to 80 years for other charges related to the murders. This sentence is to be served consecutively to the death penalty, while the death sentences are also consecutive. During sentencing, Judge Baumgartner said the crime was "one of the most incredibly outrageous, cruel and inhumane cases this court has ever seen." He also said, "how people can engage in this type of conduct is just unexplainable" and "there really is no sentence great enough to punish you for the conduct you have been convicted of." The Tennessee Supreme Court affirmed Davidson's conviction and death sentences in 2016.

On December 8, 2009, George Thomas was found guilty on multiple counts. The jury returned a sentence of life in prison without the possibility of parole on each of the four capital convictions.

Vanessa Coleman, the last defendant to face trial, was granted immunity by federal authorities for testimony in the federal case of the carjacking, but the state courts ruled that the federal grant of immunity could not extend to the state charges of murder and rape.

On May 13, 2010, Coleman was acquitted of first-degree murder and found guilty of lesser charges. On July 30, 2010, she was sentenced to 53 years in prison. During sentencing, Christian's father stated, "for me, personally, you took my baby. You took my opportunity to say yes to a young man one day. You took my (wedding) dance away. You took my opportunity to hold her child, my grandbaby."

== Appeals and retrials ==
The defendants in the four state cases from the 2000s all appealed their convictions. Sentencing judge Richard Baumgartner, one of Knox County's three Criminal Court judges, was forced to resign from the bench in March 2011, having admitted to drug addiction and purchasing prescription pain medication from convicts. A woman accused him of trading legal favors for sex during breaks in court sessions; Baumgartner pled guilty to official misconduct. It was held that his ability to conduct trials had been impaired during his prior two years on the bench, and he was disbarred in September. On December 1, 2011, Judge Jon Kerry Blackwood granted new trials to all four state defendants after the Tennessee Bureau of Investigation showed Baumgartner was likely impaired while presiding over their trials.

Blackwood set retrials for between June and November 2012, pending appeals, and set bail at $1 million for Coleman, the only defendant whose sentence had the possibility of parole. He denied a change of venue but allowed for jurors to be brought in from outside Knox County. Due to double jeopardy, the defendants faced at maximum the sentences they had already received, and thus only Davidson was eligible for capital punishment. Prosecutors conceded Baumgartner had been impaired during Coleman's trial but appealed the decision to retry Davidson, Cobbins, and Thomas. The decision to hold retrials for them was affirmed in a two to one decision by the Tennessee Court of Criminal Appeals on April 13.

In May 2012, the Tennessee Supreme Court overturned Blackwood's ruling ordering new trials for Cobbins, Davidson, and Thomas, saying that a trial judge's misconduct outside the courtroom does not necessarily require a new trial unless the misconduct is shown to have affected the trial proceedings, but that its decision "should not be construed as condoning or excusing" Baumgartner's misconduct. Judge Blackwood was asked to consider the motions again for new trials.

In June 2012, Judge Blackwood again granted new trials for Davidson, Cobbins, and Thomas, basing his decision on the "13th juror rule". Prosecutors filed to have Judge Blackwood recused from the case, citing Blackwood's emotional involvement, his ex parte communication with the defense, lack of candor with the local media, and Supreme Court guidance that recusal should be considered before any other action. Following Blackwood's recusal, Senior Judge Walter Kurtz was named to oversee the retrials and the decisions to grant them. Retrials were denied for Cobbins and Davidson, and granted for Thomas and Coleman.

=== Verdicts from the retrials ===
Facing the same charges as in her first trial, on November 20, 2012, Vanessa Coleman was convicted by a jury of the facilitation of aggravated kidnapping, facilitation of rape, and the facilitation of the murder of Channon Christian, but not of Christopher Newsom. These convictions were on lesser charges than her initial convictions. While the retrial was conducted in Knoxville, the jury for the retrial was selected from Jackson, Tennessee, more than 300 miles west of Knoxville.

Coleman's lawyers argued that she should receive a 20-year sentence, while prosecutors asked for the maximum sentence of nearly 50 years. Blackwood sentenced Coleman to 35 years in prison on February 1, 2013, minus credit for time already served. Specifically, he sentenced her to 25 years for the facilitation of Christian's murder, six years for the facilitation of kidnapping, and four years for the facilitation of rape. During sentencing, Blackwood commented that "the psychological torture of this unfortunate victim was immense." He also called the crime "the most horrible" murder case he had seen.

In 2014 the Tennessee Court of Criminal Appeals denied Coleman's request for a new trial and upheld her sentence. Judge Thomas T. Woodall wrote in his opinion: "The facts at trial showed that (Coleman) was in the (Chipman Street) house for nearly two days where (Christian) was confined and brutally raped before she was tied up, wrapped in five plastic trash bags and stuffed into a garbage can, where she died from asphyxiation...In … journal entries (written after the slayings, Coleman) described 'one hell of an adventure in the big T.N.' and wrote that she 'loved her life!'. This evidence supports the trial court's finding that (Coleman) is a dangerous offender."

On May 17, 2013, the retrial of George Thomas (with a jury empaneled in Nashville) ended in a verdict of guilty on all 38 counts. He was re-sentenced to life in prison by the jury, but with the possibility of parole after 51 years. On June 4, 2013, Judge Kurtz sentenced Thomas to two life sentences (consecutive) for the murders and 25 years (multiple concurrent) for the rapes. In 2015, the Tennessee Court of Criminal Appeals upheld Thomas's conviction. In January 2016, Thomas appealed to the United States Supreme Court but the court did not agree to hear the case.

== State trial for Eric Boyd ==
On March 20, 2018, eleven years after the murders, a Knox County grand jury returned a thirty-six-count indictment charging Eric DeWayne Boyd with first-degree felony murder, first-degree premeditated murder, especially aggravated robbery, especially aggravated kidnapping, and aggravated rape in the murders. Boyd was transported from a Federal Correctional Institution in Yazoo City, Mississippi, and booked into the Knox County Jail, where he was held on a $1 million bond.

Boyd finally went to trial on the state charges in August 2019. Unlike the other trials, owing to a long passage of time between the murders and this trial, the jury was empaneled in Knoxville and not sequestered. Co-defendant George Thomas testified as a witness in the Boyd trial. In exchange for his testimony, Thomas was allowed to have his first-degree murder convictions reduced to second-degree murder, his aggravated rape convictions reduced to aggravated assault, and his sentence reduced from life in prison with the possibility of parole to 50 years (two 25-year terms with the opportunity to reduce his sentence by up to 15 percent based on good behavior during incarceration). On August 13, 2019, a jury found Boyd guilty on nearly all charges, including premeditated first-degree murder and rape against both victims. He was also convicted on charges of carjacking, robbery, and kidnapping. Boyd was found guilty of lesser charges on two counts. Instead of finding him guilty of especially aggravated armed robbery, the jury found Boyd guilty of aggravated armed robbery. The judge immediately sentenced Boyd to life in prison as this was automatic for a murder conviction. He was also sentenced to another 90 years for other crimes, including especially aggravated kidnapping, robbery and rape. Boyd's request for a new trial was denied by Knox County Criminal Court Judge Bob McGee in 2019. In 2021, Tennessee Court of Criminal Appeals Judge Timothy L. Easter also denied Boyd a new trial. In March 2022, the Tennessee Supreme Court denied Boyd another appeal of his convictions.

== Incarceration status ==
Vanessa Coleman, the only female charged and convicted in the crimes, is held at the Debra K. Johnson Rehabilitation Center in Nashville. Serving a 35-year sentence, Coleman was eligible for parole in 2017 and her sentence expires on April 18, 2036. In August 2014, the families of the victims were notified that with good behavior, Coleman's sentence was being reduced by 16 days per month of incarceration, making her eligible for parole consideration in October 2014. The parole hearing was rescheduled from October to December. At the December 2014 hearing, Coleman was denied parole and her next parole consideration date was set for December 2020. Coleman again went before a parole board on December 8, 2020. Christian's and Newsom's mothers and Christian's father gave statements to the board opposing parole. The seven board members voted unanimously to deny Coleman parole and ensure that she would not be eligible to go before a parole board again for ten years.

Cobbins and Thomas were originally incarcerated at Riverbend Maximum Security Institution in Nashville. After the Bledsoe County Correctional Complex in Pikeville opened in 2013, they were transferred to that facility. Cobbins is currently serving a life sentence without parole at the Northwest Correctional Complex. In 2026, Cobbins was indicted for the fatal stabbing of another prisoner, 33-year-old Moriarco Lee. According to prison officials, Cobbins murdered Lee with the assistance of seven other inmates. Prosecutors are currently seeking the death penalty against Cobbins for Lee's murder.

Thomas is incarcerated at the Northeast Correctional Complex. His sentence ends in May 2053. Davidson was sentenced to death on October 30, 2009, and is incarcerated at the Riverbend Maximum Security Institution. Eric Boyd, who had been serving his sentence of 18 years at Federal Correctional Institution, Beckley, a medium-security prison near Beaver, West Virginia, was potentially eligible for release in 2022, but found guilty on charges of rape and first-degree murder on August 13, 2019. He was immediately sentenced to life in prison by the judge, who stated that a life sentence was automatic for the murder conviction. Boyd is incarcerated at the Turney Center Industrial Complex.

== Reaction ==
According to the Associated Press, some bloggers and media critics claimed that the national media ignored the murders because the victims were white while all five suspects were black. Most news reports came from local media and online news sites. Erroneous early reporting made claims of dismemberment and mutilation of Christian's body. The District Attorney denied most of the original reports containing misinformation; the source was a federal deputy U.S. Marshal after the suspects' arrest in Kentucky.

The president of Criminal Justice Journalists, an association of crime, court, and prison writers, editors, and producers, said:

I can't say that this one would have had any more coverage if five whites had been accused of doing these things to two blacks, absent a blatant racial motive... as bad as this crime is, the apparent absence of any interest group involvement or any other 'angle' might also explain the lack of coverage.

Police Chief Sterling Owen IV said that there was no indication that the crimes were racially motivated. "We have no evidence to support the notion that this was a race-based crime. We see this as a cold-blooded murder." "There is absolutely no proof of a hate crime," said John Gill, special counsel to Knox County District Attorney Randy Nichols. "We know from our investigation that the people charged in this case were friends with white people, socialized with white people, dated white people. So not only is there no evidence of any racial animus, there's evidence to the contrary."

Some commentators disagreed, claiming that such a crime represented motives of racial hatred. Conservative political commentator Michelle Malkin repeated this opinion on her blog and on Fox News' The O'Reilly Factor program. Newsom's mother also disagreed with the assertion that the offenders were not motivated by racism. "If this wasn't a hate crime, then I don't know how you would define a hate crime," said Newsom's mother. "It may have started out as a carjacking, but what it developed into was blacks hating whites. To do the things they did, they would have to hate them to do that." Christian's father, addressing those who he believes used his daughter's death to further their agenda, stated: "[the crime] ain't about you."

On May 27, 2007, fewer than 30 white supremacists, led by Alex Linder, rallied in downtown Knoxville to protest against the murders. They were met by more than 300 law enforcement officers. About twice as many counter-protesters as protestors attended, including the "Coup Clutz Clowns", an activist group which mocks the Ku Klux Klan.

After the protest, columnist Leonard Pitts dismissed claims that the crime was under-reported. He cited a 2001 report by the Berkeley Media Studies Group, which found that "Blacks and Latinos are underrepresented in news media as victims of crime and significantly overrepresented as perpetrators." Pitts wrote: "I am [...] unkindly disposed toward the crackpots, incendiaries and flat-out racists who have chosen this tragedy upon which to take an obscene and ludicrous stand. I have four words for them and any other white Americans who feel themselves similarly victimized. Cry me a river."

Reverend Ezra Maize, the president of the Knoxville chapter of the NAACP, addressed the case, saying:

It doesn't make me uncomfortable speaking out against this crime because it was African Americans [allegedly] committing a crime against Caucasians ... It's not a black-and-white issue. It's a right-and-wrong issue. Those who committed this crime were unjust in doing so, and they should pay the penalty.

The house at 2316 Chipman Street was bought by Waste Connections, a national garbage collection company with a depot on the next lot. Waste Connections demolished the house in October 2008. The company's intent was to replace the house with a memorial dedicated to Newsom and Christian. A memorial to Newsom and Christian was created at the location where the house once stood.

== Legacy ==
The Channon Gail Christian Foundation and the Channon Gail Christian Memorial Golf Tournament were established in Channon Christian's memory to provide a scholarship for a Farragut High School Senior to attend the University of Tennessee. A foundation has also been established in Newsom's name. The foundation holds an annual memorial baseball tournament at the Halls Community Park. A memorial scholarship is given annually in his name to a graduating Halls High School baseball player.

Channon Christian's father, Gary Christian, speaks at churches proclaiming how, in the spring of 2017, he asked God to restore him from his pervasive anger. He presents his testimony of how he is overcoming the anger that most East Tennesseans saw play out during news articles throughout the trials and appeals.

== Legislative changes ==
Thanks to lobbying from the families of the victims, two new laws were introduced in 2014 as a result of the case:

- The "Chris Newsom Act" was introduced to eliminate the need for a judge's signature on a jury verdict after the delivery of a unanimous verdict. This thus eliminates the '13th juror' rule, which stipulates that a judge must validate a jury's verdict. Had such a law been in place during the case, the retrials would have been avoided.
- The "Channon Christian Act" restricts attorneys and defendants in attempting to portray a victim in a negative light, such as making allegations about their behavior. During the trial, Davidson had alleged that his victims had come to his house to buy drugs. According to Christian's mother, her family felt great pain as a result of listening to defense attorneys question Christian's character during multiple trials. Meanwhile, due to laws protecting the accused, the jury was not allowed to be informed of Davidson's previous carjacking conviction.

== See also ==
- List of death row inmates in the United States § Tennessee
- List of kidnappings
