= Murders of Joel and Lisa Guy =

2016 parricide in Knoxville, Tennessee, US

Lisa Guy (left) and Joel Guy

On November 26, 2016, 61-year-old Joel Guy Sr. and 55-year-old Lisa Guy were murdered and dismembered by their son, 28-year-old Joel Michael Guy Jr., in Knoxville, Tennessee, United States. Guy Jr. stabbed his father at least 42 times; his mother at least 31 times. He was convicted of both murders in October 2020 and received 2 consecutive Life sentences plus 4 years imprisonment, with a total non-parole period of 106 years.

Guy Jr.'s parents were soon to retire and would stop providing money to their son; he was to receive a $500,000 life insurance policy if both were dead or missing. The murder involved an elaborate plot to stab both parents, dismember and dissolve their remains, clean and burn down some of the house, as well as frame the father for the crime. Guy Jr. was injured during the stabbing and left the partially dissolved remains in the house when he left to dress his wounds. Before he returned, police discovered the bloody scene upon performing a welfare check by a coworker that had called after noticing Lisa was missing. They also discovered a backpack containing a notebook detailing the plan; plastic bins with both parents' torsos and dismembered limbs dissolving in an acid-based solution of corrosive chemicals described by prosecutors as a "diabolical stew of human remains"; the father's severed hands on the floor, and the mother's head in a pot on the stove which had been boiling for over a day at the time of discovery.

== Background ==
Joel Guy Jr.
- Born: Joel Michael Guy Jr. March 13, 1988 (age 38)
- Convictions: Abuse of a corpse × 2; Felony murder × 2; First-degree murder × 2
- Penalty: 2 consecutive Life sentences plus 4 years imprisonment, with a total non-parole period of 106 years

Details
- Date apprehended: November 29, 2016

Joel Michael Guy Sr. was a pipeline engineering designer. Lisa Guy was a human resources accounts payable administrator at Jacobs Engineering in Oak Ridge.

Their son, Joel Michael Guy Jr. graduated from the Louisiana School for Math, Science, and the Arts in Natchitoches in 2006, and previously attended Hahnville High School. He had never worked and had always been supported by his family. Guy Jr. was described by others as distant and an outsider, and never bothered to establish a relationship with anyone in or outside his family, while his mother doted on him. He spent one semester at George Washington University, then attended Louisiana State University as a student and lived in Baton Rouge until the murders in 2016, ostensibly training to become a plastic surgeon.

The Guys had recently sold their Knoxville house, and planned to retire to Surgoinsville. Guy Jr. and his three half-sisters attended what was to be the last event at the Knoxville house, Thanksgiving, on Thursday, November 24, 2016.

== Planning ==
=== Book of premeditation ===
The prosecution at his trial dubbed the handwritten journal found in Guy Jr.'s backpack the "book of premeditation", as it contained detailed notes outlining his intent to murder and destroy the remains of his parents.

=== Surveillance footage ===
Guy Jr. was caught on several surveillance cameras buying the supplies he would later use to murder and try to dissolve his parents. He used cash for every transaction, and self-checkout most of the time. He bought supplies for the murder as early as November 7, purchasing several items at an Ace Hardware in Napoleonville, including muriatic acid and food-grade hydrogen peroxide. On November 18 at Home Depot, cameras recorded him buying the bleach sprayer, extension cords, and a timer. At Academy Sports on November 19, he was seen buying a knife. On November 21, cameras captured Guy Jr. at a Knoxville Walmart buying blue totes.

Lisa Guy was also seen on surveillance footage shortly before her murder, buying items at Walmart at approximately 12:15 PM.

== Murders ==
=== Joel Guy Sr. ===
On November 26, Guy Jr. attacked and killed his father with a knife in a second floor exercise room while his mother was out shopping for groceries at Walmart. The scene showed evidence of a struggle, with torn blinds, blood on the wall and corner, and an overturned Bowflex machine.

=== Lisa Guy ===
Upon arriving home, Lisa Guy entered through the front door, dropped the groceries on the floor of the foyer, proceeded upstairs, was attacked, then killed with a knife. Nine of her ribs were severed.

=== Dismemberment ===
Guy Sr.'s hands were removed at the wrists and left nearby on the exercise room floor. Lisa's head was removed, carried downstairs, placed in a pot on the stove and heated. At trial, the forensic examiner testified the head was not just severed but broken off with force. Both victims also had their arms and legs disarticulated, Guy Sr. at the waist and Lisa at the knees, and their limbs and torsos were placed in a bin full of chemicals to dissolve. Each body had a large gash inflicted after death so that the chemicals would more quickly seep into the body's main cavity.

=== Cuts to perpetrator ===
In the assault on his father, Guy Jr. sustained several cuts to his hands, including a deep cut to his left thumb. At approximately 3:30 PM, Guy Jr. was seen in Walmart's first aid section, obtaining bandages and ointment for the wounds to his hands. He also purchased isopropyl alcohol and hydrogen peroxide.

On Sunday, Guy Jr. drove back to Baton Rouge to have his wounds treated at the student clinic.

== Investigation ==
Lisa's boss, Jennifer Whited, was suspicious of her absence from work and called police for a welfare check.

=== Welfare check ===
At first, Knox County officers Steven Ballard and Jeremy McCord and others found a seemingly empty house on Goldenview Lane. The property was for sale, yet there was no real-estate lock on the front door. They soon discovered the back door doorknob had been removed and installed on the front door. Through the front door, they could see groceries on the floor, including perishable items such as bacon, sausage and ice cream. Through the hole left by the missing back doorknob, they could sense heat and a strange smell emanating from the house, and from another angle, they could see the groceries. An officer used a garage door opener in one of the Guys' cars to gain access to the house.

They first discovered a table with the Guys' wallets and a sledgehammer on top, and then another with long guns. Downstairs, the stove was on and the contents of a pot were boiling. At the bottom of the stairs were the grocery items seen earlier. They ascended the stairs, hearing an intermittently barking dog. They looked down a hallway, saw Joel Guy Sr.'s severed hands on the floor, and discovered the dismembered corpses in solution in a bathroom.

Among other items investigators found at the home were sewer line cleaner, a bag of baking soda, drain opener, a bottle of muriatic acid, lye, hydrogen peroxide, several bottles of bleach, a spray bottle, a pair of gloves and trash bags. Investigators also discovered a note in an open suitcase with the name and an address of a Louisiana Ace Hardware store, along with a notation about sewer line cleaner.

The toxins required bio-hazard equipment for removal by the Knox County Sheriff's Office Hazmat Team. Due to the volume of evidence found, KCSO's Forensics Unit worked throughout Monday night and into the following day processing the crime scene.

=== Apprehension of suspect ===
The FBI, Knox County Sheriff's Office and East Baton Rouge Sheriff's Office placed Guy Jr. under surveillance for a few days and apprehended him on November 29 as he was entering his 2006 Hyundai Sonata in the Nicholson Drive apartment complex parking lot in Baton Rouge.

A meat grinder was discovered in the trunk of Guy Jr.'s car.

== Trial ==
Guy Jr. pled not guilty, yet filed a motion that he be given the death penalty if convicted. Guy Jr.'s defense counsel, John Halstead and Jonathan Harwell, presented no evidence on his behalf. The prosecution was led by Leslie Nassios and Hector Sanchez.

The trial took four days. Guy Jr. was found guilty and sentenced to 2 consecutive life sentences plus 4 years imprisonment. He was also convicted of abuse of a corpse.

In 2023, an appeal to overturn the sentence of Guy Jr. was denied.

Joel Michael Guy Jr. is currently incarcerated at the Northwest Correctional Complex in Tiptonville, Tennessee.
