= The Lambs of Christ =

Militant anti-abortion organization

The Lambs of Christ, also known as Victim Souls of the Unborn Christ-Child, is a Christian anti-abortion organization in the United States. It was founded by Norman Weslin in 1988.

In 1992, Time described the group as "the most zealous and aggressive of the pro-life organizations" in wanting to shut down abortion clinics, using tactics like blockades and chaining themselves to objects so they would be difficult to remove. Weslin described the approach as buying time, saying, "The longer it takes to cut us out of our locks, the longer the killing machines are off." Another anti-abortion group, Operation Rescue, did not officially support the blockades, but would refer interested people to the Lambs.

In 1998, James Charles Kopp, a member of the organization, murdered abortion provider Dr. Barnett Slepian. Kopp had previously protested with the Lambs outside of Slepian's clinic in 1993.

In 2009, Weslin was arrested during anti-abortion protests at the University of Notre Dame when then-President Barack Obama was giving a commencement address.
