= Tennessee Department of Correction =

Government agency in Tennessee, United States

- Abbreviation: TDOC

Agency overview
- Formed: 1923

Jurisdictional structure
- Operations jurisdiction: Tennessee, USA
- Map of Tennessee Department of Correction's jurisdiction
- Area: 42,169 square miles (109,220 km^{2})
- Population: 6,214,888 (2008 est.)
- General nature: Civilian police

Operational structure
- Headquarters: 6th Floor; Rachel Jackson Building; Nashville, Tennessee
- Elected officer responsible: Bill Lee, Governor of Tennessee
- Agency executive: Chris Hansen (Interim), Commissioner

Facilities
- Correctional Facilities: 14

Website
- Tennessee DOC Website

The Tennessee Department of Correction (TDOC) is a Cabinet-level agency within the Tennessee state government responsible for the oversight of more than 20,000 convicted offenders in Tennessee's fourteen prisons, four of which are privately managed by CoreCivic. The department is headed by the Tennessee Commissioner of Correction, who is currently Frank Strada. TDOC facilities' medical and mental health services are provided by Corizon. Juvenile offenders not sentenced as adults are supervised by the independent Tennessee Department of Children's Services, while inmates granted parole or sentenced to probation are overseen by the Department of Correction (TDOC)/Department of Parole. The agency is fully accredited by the American Correctional Association. The department has its headquarters on the sixth floor of the Rachel Jackson Building in Nashville.

As of April 30, 2020, the Tennessee Department of Corrections supervised sixteen prisons (counting two women's prisons as distinct from the men's prisons on the same site), including four private prisons operated by CoreCivic. These facilities have a total of 24,069 beds and an operating capacity to house 23,202 imprisoned individuals. On that date, 20,965 people were held in Tennessee prisons.

== History ==
In 1923, the Administrative Reorganization Act created the Department of Institutions, charged with the management of the Tennessee prison system.In 1933, the General Assembly passed legislation that created an Industrial Division within the Department of Institutions.

In 1937, the name was changed to the Department of Institutions and Public Welfare, which had responsibility for a Confederate Soldier's Home, a School for the Blind, a School for the Deaf, a Tennessee Industrial School at the state penitentiary, the Blind Commission, the Clover Bottom Developmental Center, three regional psychiatric hospitals, and the Gailor Center.

In 1939, the Department of Institutions and Public Welfare was divided into a Department of Institutions and a separate Department of Public Welfare.

In 1953, the responsibility over mental health facilities was separated into the Department of Mental Health, and in 1955, the Department of Institutions arrived at its present name, the Department of Correction.

In 1961, the state legislature established the Division of Adult Probation and Parole within the department.

In 1963, an act created a Division of Youth Services and provided for an assistant commissioner.

In 1970, a Division of Rehabilitative Services was created by the General Assembly. In that same year, an act passed that relieved the Commissioner of the Department of Correction of the position of Chairman of the Board of Pardons and Paroles, with the position now being elected by Board members.

=== Central office ===
The Department of Corrections Central Office was moved to the Andrew Jackson State Office Building. In 1972, an act reformulated the Board of Pardons and Paroles, with the board now consisting of three full-time professional members appointed by the governor, including the chairman. In 1973, the Department of Corrections Central Office was moved to the First American Center. In 1974, the Tennessee Corrections Institute was created to train employees of the department. In 1978, the Board of Paroles expanded its membership to five. In 1979, the Department of Correction Central Office was again moved to the State Office Building, an act made the Board of Pardons and Paroles separate from the Department of Correction, the Board of Paroles became an autonomous unit, and the Department of Correction Supervision and Rehabilitation Fund was established.

In 1982, disbursement of funds for the fund was transferred from the Tennessee Department of Revenue to the Department of Correction. In the mid-1980s, the Department fell under federal oversight after a federal lawsuit was filed by inmates, who had complained of overcrowding and unfit conditions. In 1985, in a special session, the General Assembly funded over $320 million to improve the prison system as part of a Comprehensive Correction Improvement Act. In November 1994, Tennessee's prison systems were released from federal oversight.

=== Organization of the department ===
In 1989, Tennessee Department of Correction's facilities were organized into three regions, East, Middle, and West, with administrators appointed for each region. The Department of Youth Services was created, with all juvenile responsibilities and functions transferred from the Department of Correction. In March 1992, the operation of the South Central Correctional Center was contracted to the Corrections Corporation of America, with the facility being a test case of privatization of prison operations. In 1994, the department's final two institutions passed American Correctional Association accreditation audits, making the department the first adult correctional system in the country to have all its programs nationally accredited. In 1995, the department was reorganized, and the regional concept was abolished.

=== Recent legislation ===
In 1997, legislation created the Sex Offender Treatment Board and Provider Network. DNA testing of all sex offenders required by legislation was begun. Legislation established the Tennessee Internet Crime Information Center, which provides online registries of sex offenders, missing children, and out-of-state parole and probation supervision. The departmental management system was restructured, and a programming planning section was created. Educational programming in institutions was also restructured. During the 100th Tennessee General Assembly, legislation was introduced to expand privatization of prison operations, but was deferred until the following session, when it was withdrawn from consideration. The General Assembly also passed a bill that allowed members of a victim's immediate family to watch an execution through a closed television circuit in an area separate from other witnesses.

In 1998, the General Assembly established lethal injection as the method of execution for anyone that commits an offense on or after January 1, 1999. Legislation passed that transferred duties and responsibilities relating to probation services and community grant programs from the Department of Correction to the Board of Paroles, which had its name changed to the Board of Probation and Paroles. In 1999, the Department opened the first Security Threat Group in the Southeastern Tennessee State Regional Correctional Facility (Renamed Bledsoe County Correctional Complex). In 2000, the Governor signed legislation making lethal injection, rather than electrocution, the standard method of execution for any person sentenced to death. Inmates sentenced to death for offenses committed prior to January 1, 1999, will be executed by lethal injection, or electrocution if the inmate requests it.

Also becoming law in the year 2000 was a law that added a list of authorized witnesses for an execution. Additions may include one member of the defense counsel of the condemned as well as the Attorney General and the Reporter, or his or her designee. A Tennessee Volunteer Resource Board was created by the state legislature, which expanded the functions of the prior volunteer advisory board to include parolees as well as inmates and probationers. In 2001, a Director of Pre-Release Transition was appointed by the Commissioner of Correction to coordinate statewide pre-release programming, and a statewide contact to provide health care for the state's inmate population was added.

On October 31, 2002, Tennessee's Felony Offender Information Lookup was launched, allowing the public to search for an inmate's location, inmate number, and early release date. In 2002, the state also launched the "Tennessee Bridges" program, with the Department of Correction and the Board of Probation and Parole receiving a 1 million dollar federal grant.

== Facilities ==
see main List of Tennessee state prisons

Bledsoe County Correctional Complex serves as reception and classification center for male offenders. The Tennessee Prison for Women serves as the state reception and classification center for new female prisoners.

As of 2016, Tennessee houses state inmates in four private prisons, all run by Corrections Corporation of America. According to the state's Private Prison Contracting Act of 1986, which authorizes only one private prison for state inmates, Tennessee contracts directly with CCA for inmates held at South Central Correctional Facility. For the other three facilities the state circumvents the statute by contracting with the local county. In turn the county signs an agreement with CCA.

== Death row ==
Male death row prisoners are housed in the Riverbend Maximum Security Institution. All female death row inmates are housed at the Debra K. Johnson Rehabilitation Center. Men are housed in dedicated death row units, while women are not housed in special death row units because few women go on death row. Executions occur at the Riverbend Maximum Security Institution. From 1916 to 1960, executions occurred at the Tennessee State Prison.

== Fallen officers ==
Since the establishment of the Tennessee Department of Correction, 20 correctional employees have died in the line of duty.

== See also ==
- List of United States state correction agencies
- List of Tennessee state prisons
- List of law enforcement agencies in Tennessee
- List of U.S. state prisons
- Tennessee Board of Parole
