= Bledsoe County Correctional Complex =

State prison in Pikeville, Bledsoe County, Tennessee

Coordinates: 35°44′43″N 85°15′09″W

- Interactive map of Bledsoe County Correctional Complex
- Location: 1045 Horsehead Road Pikeville, Tennessee
- Status: open
- Security class: mixed (intake facility)
- Capacity: 2,265
- Opened: 2012
- Managed by: Tennessee Department of Corrections
- Director: Brett Cobble

The Bledsoe County Correctional Complex is a state prison in Pikeville, Bledsoe County, Tennessee, United States, owned and operated by the Tennessee Department of Corrections.

The facility opened in 2012 as an intake and diagnostic facility. Bledsoe County houses a mix of inmate security levels.

The only access to the $208 million complex of 23 buildings is an entry tunnel, allowing an uninterrupted perimeter fence. Individual pre-cast cells, of 80 square feet, were fully assembled off-site and then stacked by crane. The architects were the DLR Group.

Bledsoe County has 3 sites;Site 1 the diagnostic center, site 2, The former Southeastern Tennessee State Regional Correctional Facility built in 1980 that was converted into an 152 bed annex that houses men and site 3, also known as unit 28 which houses approximately 196 female offenders.

== Notable inmates ==
Notable criminals incarcerated at the facility include:

- Letalvis Cobbins – convicted of the 2007 kidnapping, rape, and murders of Channon Christian and Christopher Newsom
- Travis Reinking – convicted of the Nashville Waffle House shooting
- George Geovonni Thomas – convicted of the 2007 kidnapping, rape, and murders of Channon Christian and Christopher Newsom
