= List of law enforcement agencies in Tennessee =

This is a list of law enforcement agencies in the state of Tennessee.

According to the United States Bureau of Justice Statistics' 2008 Census of State and Local Law Enforcement Agencies, the state had 375 law enforcement agencies employing 15,976 sworn police officers, about 256 for each 100,000 residents.

== State agencies ==
- Tennessee Alcoholic Beverage Commission
- Tennessee Bureau of Investigation
- Tennessee Department of Correction
- Tennessee Department of Revenue
- Tennessee Department of Safety and Homeland Security
- Tennessee Highway Patrol
- Tennessee Wildlife Resources Agency
- Tennessee Governor's Task Force on Marijuana Eradication
- Tennessee Department of Agriculture, Agricultural Crime Unit

== County agencies ==
- Anderson County Sheriff's Office
- Bedford County Sheriff's Office
- Benton County Sheriff's Office
- Bledsoe County Sheriff's Office
- Blount County Sheriff's Office
- Bradley County Sheriff's Office
- Campbell County Sheriff's Office
- Cannon County Sheriff's Office
- Carroll County Sheriff's Office
- Carter County Sheriff's Office
- Cheatham County Sheriff's Office
- Chester County Sheriff's Office
- Claiborne County Sheriff's Office
- Clay County Sheriff's Office
- Cocke County Sheriff's Office
- Coffee County Sheriff's Office
- Crockett County Sheriff's Office
- Cumberland County Sheriff's Office
- Davidson County Sheriff's Office
- Decatur County Sheriff's Office
- DeKalb County Sheriff's Office
- Dickson County Sheriff's Office
- Dyer County Sheriff's Office
- Fayette County Sheriff's Office
- Fentress County Sheriff's Office
- Franklin County Sheriff's Office
- Gibson County Sheriff's Office
- Giles County Sheriff's Office
- Grainger County Sheriff's Office
- Greene County Sheriff's Office
- Grundy County Sheriff's Office
- Hamblen County Sheriff's Office
- Hamilton County Sheriff's Office
- Hancock County Sheriff's Office
- Hardeman County Sheriff's Office
- Hardin County Sheriff's Office
- Hartsville/Trousdale County Sheriff’s Department
- Hawkins County Sheriff's Office
- Haywood County Sheriff's Office
- Henderson County Sheriff's Office
- Henry County Sheriff's Office
- Hickman County Sheriff's Office
- Houston County Sheriff's Office
- Humphreys County Sheriff's Office
- Jackson County Sheriff's Office
- Jefferson County Sheriff's Office
- Johnson County Sheriff's Office
- Knox County Sheriff's Office
- Lake County Sheriff's Office
- Lauderdale County Sheriff's Office
- Lawrence County Sheriff's Office
- Lewis County Sheriff's Office
- Lincoln County Sheriff's Office
- Loudon County Sheriff's Office
- Macon County Sheriff's Office
- Madison County Sheriff's Office
- Marion County Sheriff's Office
- Marshall County Sheriff's Office
- Maury County Sheriff's Office
- McMinn County Sheriff's Office
- McNairy County Sheriff's Office
- Meigs County Sheriff's Office
- Monroe County Sheriff's Office
- Montgomery County Sheriff's Office
- Moore County Sheriff's Office
- Morgan County Sheriff's Office
- Obion County Sheriff's Office
- Overton County Sheriff's Office
- Perry County Sheriff's Office
- Pickett County Sheriff's Office
- Polk County Sheriff's Office
- Putnam County Sheriff's Office
- Rhea County Sheriff's Office
- Roane County Sheriff's Office
- Robertson County Sheriff's Office
- Rutherford County Sheriff's Office
- Scott County Sheriff's Office
- Sequatchie County Sheriff's Office
- Sevier County Sheriff's Office
- Shelby County Sheriff's Office
- Smith County Sheriff's Office
- Stewart County Sheriff's Office
- Sullivan County Sheriff's Office
- Sumner County Sheriff's Office
- Tipton County Sheriff's Office
- Unicoi County Sheriff's Office
- Union County Sheriff's Office
- Van Buren County Sheriff's Office
- Warren County Sheriff's Office
- Washington County Sheriff's Office
- Wayne County Sheriff's Office
- Weakley County Sheriff's Office
- White County Sheriff's Office
- Williamson County Sheriff's Office
- Wilson County Sheriff's Office

== Municipal agencies ==
- Adamsville Police Department
- Alamo Police Department
- Alcoa Police Department
- Alexandria Police Department
- Algood Police Department
- Ardmore Police Department
- Ashland City Police Department
- Atoka Police Department
- Athens Police Department
- Bartlett Police Department
- Baxter Police Department
- Bean Station Police Department
- Belle Meade Police Department
- Bells Police Department
- Benton Police Department
- Blaine Police Department
- Bluff City Police Department
- Bolivar Police Department
- Bradford Police Department
- Brentwood Police Department
- Brighton Police Department
- Bristol Police Department
- Brownsville Police Department
- Bruceton Police Department
- Calhoun Police Department
- Camden Police Department
- Carthage Police Department
- Caryville Police Department
- Celina Police Department
- Centerville Police Department
- Charleston Police Department
- Chattanooga Police Department
- Church Hill Police Department
- Clarksville Police Department
- Cleveland Police Department
- Clinton Police Department
- Collegedale Police Department
- Collierville Police Department
- Collinwood Police Department
- Columbia Police Department
- Cookeville Police Department
- Coopertown Police Department
- Covington Police Department
- Cowan Police Department
- Crossville Police Department
- Cumberland Gap Police Department
- Dandridge Police Department
- Dayton Police Department
- Decatur Police Department
- Decaturville Police Department
- Decherd Police Department
- Dickson Police Department
- Dover Police Department
- Dresden Police Department
- Dunlap Police Department
- Dyer Police Department
- Dyersburg Police Department
- East Ridge Police Department
- Elizabethton Police Department
- Elkton Police Department
- Englewood Police Department
- Erin Police Department
- Erwin Police Department
- Estill Springs Police Department
- Etowah Police Department
- Fairview Police Department
- Fayetteville Police Department
- Franklin Police Department
- Gainesboro Police Department
- Gallatin Police Department
- Gallaway Police Department
- Gatlinburg Police Department
- Germantown Police Department
- Gleason Police Department
- Goodlettsville Police Department
- Gordonsville Police Department
- Graysville Police Department
- Greenbrier Police Department
- Greeneville Police Department
- Greenfield Police Department
- Halls Police Department
- Harriman Police Department
- Henderson Police Department
- Hendersonville Police Department
- Hohenwald Police Department
- Hollow Rock Police Department
- Hornbeak Police Department
- Humboldt Police Department
- Huntingdon Police Department
- Huntland Police Department
- Jacksboro Police Department
- Jackson Police Department
- Jamestown Police Department
- Jasper Police Department
- Jefferson City Police Department
- Jellico Police Department
- Johnson City Police Department
- Jonesborough Police Department
- Kenton Police Department
- Kimball Police Department
- Kingsport Police Department
- Kingston Police Department
- Knoxville Police Department
- La Vergne Police Department
- Lafayette Police Department
- LaFollette Police Department
- Lake City Police Department
- Lawrenceburg Police Department
- Lebanon Police Department
- Lenoir City Police Department
- Lewisburg Police Department
- Lexington Police Department
- Livingston Police Department
- Lookout Mountain Police Department
- Loretto Police Department
- Loudon Police Department
- Madisonville Police Department
- Manchester Police Department
- Martin Police Department
- Maryville Police Department
- Mason Police Department
- Maynardville Police Department
- McEwen Police Department
- McKenzie Police Department
- McMinnville Police Department
- Medina Police Department
- Memphis Police Department
- Metropolitan Nashville Police Department
- Middleton Police Department
- Milan Police Department
- Millersville Police Department
- Millington Police Department
- Monteagle City Police Department
- Monterey Police Department
- Morristown Police Department
- Mount Carmel Police Department
- Mount Juliet Police Department
- Mount Pleasant Police Department
- Mountain City Police Department
- Munford Police Department
- Murfreesboro Police Department
- New Johnsonville Police Department
- New Market Police Department
- New Tazewell Police Department
- Newbern Police Department
- Newport Police Department
- Niota Police Department
- Nolensville Police Department
- Norris Police Department
- Oak Ridge Police Department
- Obion Police Department
- Oliver Springs Police Department
- Oneida Police Department
- Paris Police Department
- Parsons Police Department
- Pigeon Forge Police Department
- Pikeville Police Department
- Pittman Center Police Department
- Plainview Police Department
- Pleasant View Police Department
- Portland Police Department
- Powells Crossroads Police Department
- Pulaski Police Department
- Red Bank Police Department
- Red Boiling Springs Police Department
- Ridgely Police Department
- Ripley Police Department
- Rockwood Police Department
- Rutledge Police Department
- Savannah Police Department
- Scotts Hill Police Department
- Selmer Police Department
- Sevierville Police Department
- Sewanee Police Department
- Sharon Police Department
- Shelbyville Police Department
- Signal Mountain Police Department
- Smithville Police Department
- Smyrna Police Department
- Sneedville Police Department
- Soddy-Daisy Police Department
- Somerville Police Department
- South Pittsburg Police Department
- Sparta Police Department
- Spencer Police Department
- Spring City Police Department
- Spring Hill Police Department
- Springfield Police Department
- Surgoinsville Police Department
- Sweetwater Police Department
- Tazewell Police Department
- Tellico Plains Police Department
- Tiptonville Police Department
- Town of Mosheim Police Department
- Townsend Police Department
- Tracy City Police Department
- Trenton Police Department
- Trezevant Police Department
- Troy Police Department
- Tullahoma Police Department
- Unicoi Police Department
- Union City Police Department
- Vonore Police Department
- Wartrace Police Department
- Watertown Police Department
- Waverly Police Department
- Waynesboro Police Department
- Westmoreland Police Department
- White Bluff Police Department
- White House Police Department
- White Pine Police Department
- Whiteville Police Department
- Whitwell Police Department
- Winchester Police Department
- Woodbury Police Department

== College/University Police Agencies ==
- Austin Peay State University Police
- East Tennessee State University DPS
- Tennessee Valley Authority Police
- University of Tennessee Police
- University of Tennessee - Martin Police Department
- Vanderbilt University Police Department
- Middle Tennessee State University Police Department
- Knox County Schools Security Division
- Nashville State Community College Police Department
- Tennessee State University Police Department

== Disbanded/Defunct agencies ==
- Ridgetop Police Department
- Lakewood Police Department
- Walden Police Department

== See also ==
- Law enforcement in the United States
