= Paul Noel (police chief) =

American law enforcement executive

Chief of Police of the Knoxville Police Department
- Incumbent
- Assumed office June 13, 2022

Personal details
- Education: Loyola University New Orleans

Paul Noel is an American law enforcement executive who has served as the 27th Chief of Police of the Knoxville Police Department since June 13, 2022. Prior to his appointment in Knoxville, Noel spent more than 25 years with the New Orleans Police Department (NOPD), where he served in several senior leadership roles, including Deputy Superintendent and Chief of Detectives.

== Early life and education ==
Noel earned a Bachelor of Arts in Criminal Justice in 2005 and a Master’s degree in Criminal Justice in 2009 from Loyola University New Orleans. He is a graduate of the FBI National Academy, completing its 230th session in 2007.

== Career ==
=== New Orleans Police Department ===
Noel joined the New Orleans Police Department in 1997 and rose through the ranks over more than two decades, serving as patrol officer, detective, supervisor, and commander.

From 2012 to 2015, he served as Commander of NOPD’s Second District, overseeing district operations and community-based policing initiatives. During that period, he was tasked with leading reforms of the department’s Sex Crimes Unit, including the reinvestigation of hundreds of sexual assault cases and the revision of investigative policies.

From 2015 to 2020, Noel served as Deputy Superintendent of Field Operations, overseeing more than 900 sworn officers across all patrol districts. During this period, New Orleans experienced a significant decline in violent crime, including a reported 31 percent reduction in homicides between 2016 and 2019.

In 2020, Noel was appointed Chief of Detectives, where he supervised all follow-up investigations, including homicide cases. Under his leadership, the department’s homicide clearance rate increased substantially.

While serving in senior leadership at NOPD, Noel was a key figure in the development and implementation of the Ethical Policing Is Courageous (EPIC) peer-intervention program, which later evolved into the national Active Bystandership for Law Enforcement (ABLE) Project.

=== Knoxville Police Department ===
In June 2022, Noel was sworn in as Chief of Police of the Knoxville Police Department, becoming the city’s 27th police chief.

As chief, Noel oversaw one of the largest organizational restructurings in the department’s history, including the re-establishment of the Central District, expanding the city from two to three patrol districts.

During his first full year as chief, Knoxville reported a 35 percent decrease in homicides and a 12 percent decline in non-fatal shootings. In his second year, homicides declined an additional four percent, while non-fatal shootings fell by 45 percent.

Noel also created the department’s first Deputy Chief of Professional Standards position, transforming Internal Affairs into the Office of Professional Standards.

Under his leadership, the Knoxville Police Department became the first law enforcement agency in Tennessee to join the Active Bystandership for Law Enforcement (ABLE) Project.

== Suspension ==
In August 2026, Knoxville Mayor Indya Kincannon suspended Noel for one month without pay following an independent investigation into inappropriate text messages he exchanged with a female police officer under his command. The investigation found that some of the messages were flirtatious and sexually suggestive and concluded that Noel's conduct violated Knoxville Police Department standards. The female officer told the investigator that she felt pressured to reciprocate some of Noel's messages because of the power imbalance between them, although Noel denied intending to pressure or coerce her. The investigation found no evidence of a physical or sexual relationship, sexual coercion, preferential treatment, or criminal conduct. Noel publicly apologized and accepted responsibility for his actions, and the city also required him to undergo counseling and leadership training.

== Awards and recognition ==
In 2021, Noel received the Hayes Award from the Police Executive Research Forum (PERF) for his leadership in implementing ethical policing and peer-intervention initiatives.
