= Operation Tarnished Shield =

Political corruption sting operation

Operation Tarnished Shield was a three-year sting operation by the Federal Bureau of Investigation and Tennessee Highway Patrol to root out political corruption in Cookeville, Tennessee, which included the arrest of two former law enforcement officers.

== Sting operation ==
The FBI had an undercover agent who posed as a member of a Chicago based drug and money laundering organization. At the start of the investigation the scheme was to defraud automobile insurance companies. Agents later learned law enforcement officers in the area were willing to transport drugs and drug money.

Jones and Middlebrook assisted in the transportation of the drugs and drug money as well as recruited local law enforcement officers to transport thousands of dollars believed to be proceeds of illegal drugs. Middlebrook also laundered $650,000 in purported drug proceeds after Middlebrook, Martin and Williamson transported the cocaine. Scott, holding himself out as a deputy jailor with the Putnam County Sheriff's Office, transported $50,000 in purported illegal proceeds from Nashville to Cookeville. He told undercover agents he was still an active deputy and wore his sheriff's department jacket to the meeting.

After an undercover investigation by federal and state authorities that lasted almost three years, four law enforcement officials, which includes one former White County deputy, as well as four civilians, were arrested for charges ranging from distributing cocaine to money laundering.

== Arrests ==
Several Cookeville, Tennessee, citizens were arrested in August 2005 in connection with money laundering and transporting cocaine across state lines. Several people were charged, and all subsequently pleaded guilty. Troy Bell, Ronald Middlebrook, Darrell Thomas Jones, Algood police officer Steven Bert Williamson and Cookeville Police officer Reno Martin, were charged with conspiracy to distribute cocaine; Gregory Dale Scott, Ronald Middlebrook and certified public accountant Robin Blaskis with conspiracy to commit money laundering. Blythe, a Cookeville police officer, was charged with illegally transferring a firearm. Seven defendants pled guilty and one went to trial.
