= TDSHS =

TDSHS may refer to:

- Texas Department of State Health Services
- Tennessee Department of Safety and Homeland Security
