= Jeff Long (sheriff) =

Tennessee Department of Safety and Homeland Security Commissioner

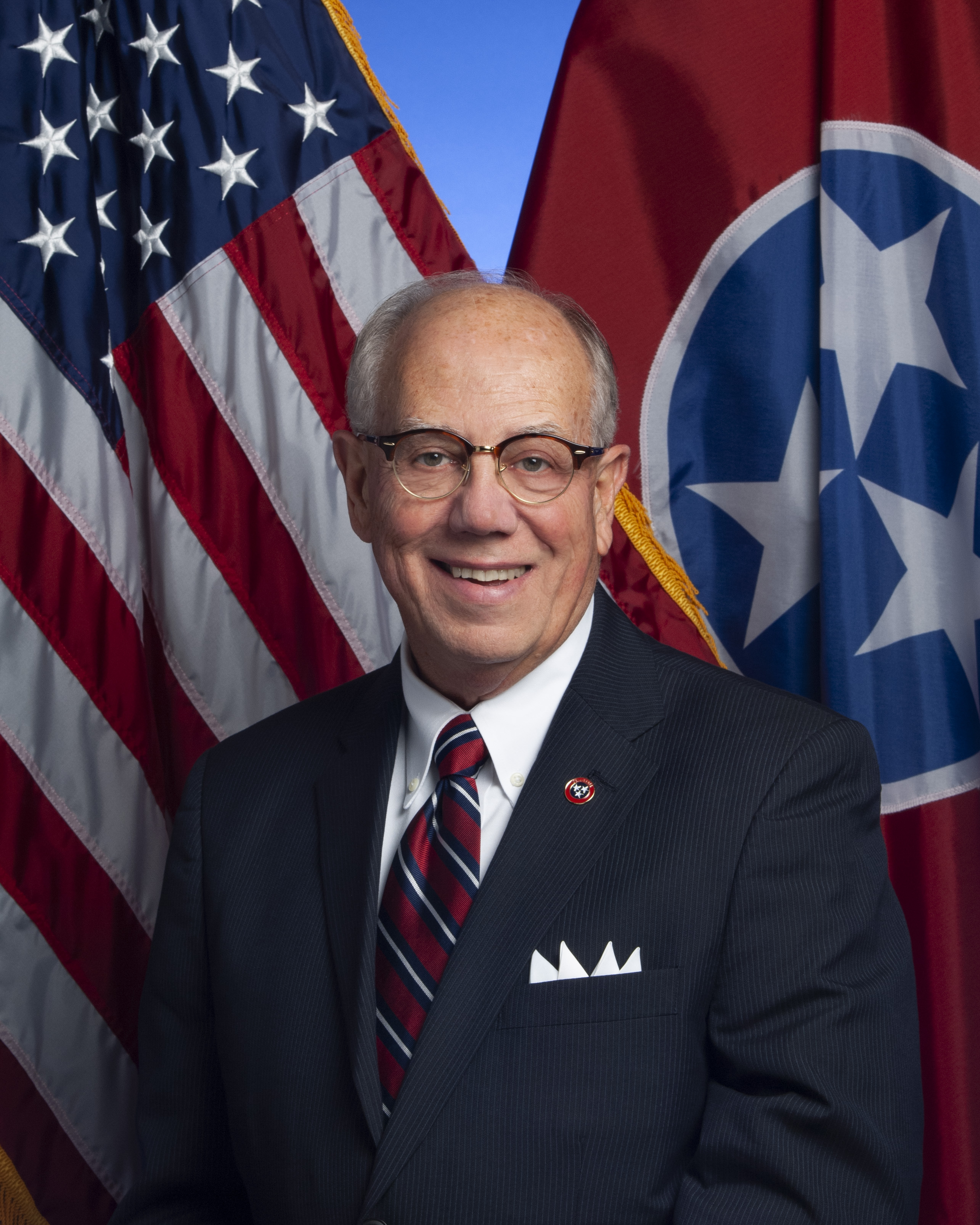
- Long in January 2019

4th Commissioner and Governor’s Homeland Security Advisor of the Tennessee Department of Safety and Homeland Security
- Incumbent
- Assumed office January 2019
- Governor: Bill Lee
- Preceded by: David Purkey

Personal details
- Education: University of Memphis (BA); Nashville School of Law (JD)

Jeff Long is the acting commissioner of Tennessee Department of Safety and Homeland Security. Before assuming this role, Long served as the Sheriff of Williamson County after his election in August 2008.

== Education ==
Long holds a Bachelor of Arts Degree in Political Science from the University of Memphis and a Doctorate of Jurisprudence Degree from the Nashville School of Law.

== Career ==
Long has held various positions, including Assistant District Attorney for the 21st Judicial District, Special Agent in Charge with the Tennessee Bureau of Investigation, Investigator for the 21st Judicial District, Arson Investigator with the Tennessee Fire Marshal’s Office, Captain with the Williamson County Sheriff’s Office, and Federal Hospital Police Officer with the Veterans Administration Hospital in Memphis, Tennessee.

Long has had the honor of serving on the Dignitary Protection Detail for several Presidents, including Ronald Reagan, Bill Clinton, George H. W. Bush, and George W. Bush, as well as Princess Anne, daughter of Queen Elizabeth. He has held leadership positions in various law enforcement associations, including past president of the Tennessee Sheriffs’ Association and a current member of the National Sheriffs’ Association and the International Association of Chiefs of Police (IACP). In 2014, Governor Bill Haslam appointed Sheriff Long to the Peace Officers Standards and Training Commission.

Commissioner Long's appointment to the helm of the Tennessee Department of Safety and Homeland Security came under the administration of Governor Bill Lee in January 2019. Long resides in Williamson County with his wife, Dora, and their family, including two children, Julie and Justin, and five grandchildren.

== Awards ==
Long has received numerous accolades and awards for his service.

- Task Force Against Domestic Violence Law Enforcement Award
- John Marshall American Inns of Court
- 2013 Law Enforcement of the Year by the Williamson County Bar Association
- Commendation from FBI Director Williams S. Sessions
- Nashville Business Journal Williamson County 2013 Impact Award
- Master Hall of Fame Morris Heithcock Lodge 41 FOP award
- 2013 Tennessee Sheriff of the Year Award
- Sons of the American Revolution Law Enforcement Commendation Medal
