= FCSO =

FCSO may refer to:

- Fairfax County Sheriff's Office
- Fentress County Sheriff's Office (Tennessee)
- Frederick County Sheriff's Office (Maryland)
