= Alcoa Police Department =

American local law-enforcement organisation

- Abbreviation: APD

Jurisdictional structure
- Operations jurisdiction: Alcoa, Tennessee, United States
- Legal jurisdiction: Alcoa
- General nature: Local civilian police

Operational structure
- Officers: 37
- Unsworn members: 8
- Elected officer responsible: Don Mull, Mayor of Alcoa, Tennessee
- Agency executive: David Carswell, Chief of Police
- Divisions: 2: Administration; Operations

The Alcoa Police Department is the primary provider of law enforcement services for Alcoa, Tennessee.

== Organizational structure ==
The Alcoa Police Department is headed by the Chief of Police. The department currently has an assigned strength of 37 police officers and 8 civilian staff members. The department operations are divided between two divisions, the Administrative Division, and the Operations Division.

=== Chief of Police ===
The Chief of the Alcoa Police Department is responsible for all activities carried out through the department. The Chief of Police reports directly to the Mayor and City Council of Alcoa. The current Chief of Police is David Carswell.

=== Administrative Division ===
The Administrative Division is responsible for all civilian support functions, including records, evidence holding, accreditation, and internal affairs. The current commander of the division as of 2010 is Captain Phillip Dunn.

=== Operations Division ===
The Operations Division of the department is responsible for all law enforcement and investigations conducted by the department. The two units that make up the division are the Patrol Unit and the Detective Unit, both commanded by a Lieutenant. The current commander of the Operations Division as of 2010 is Captain Dale Boring.

== Rank structure ==
Title	Insignia
Chief of Police	
Captain	
Lieutenant	
Sergeant	
Police officer/Detective	

== See also ==
- List of law enforcement agencies in Tennessee
