= State police =

Type of sub-national territorial police force

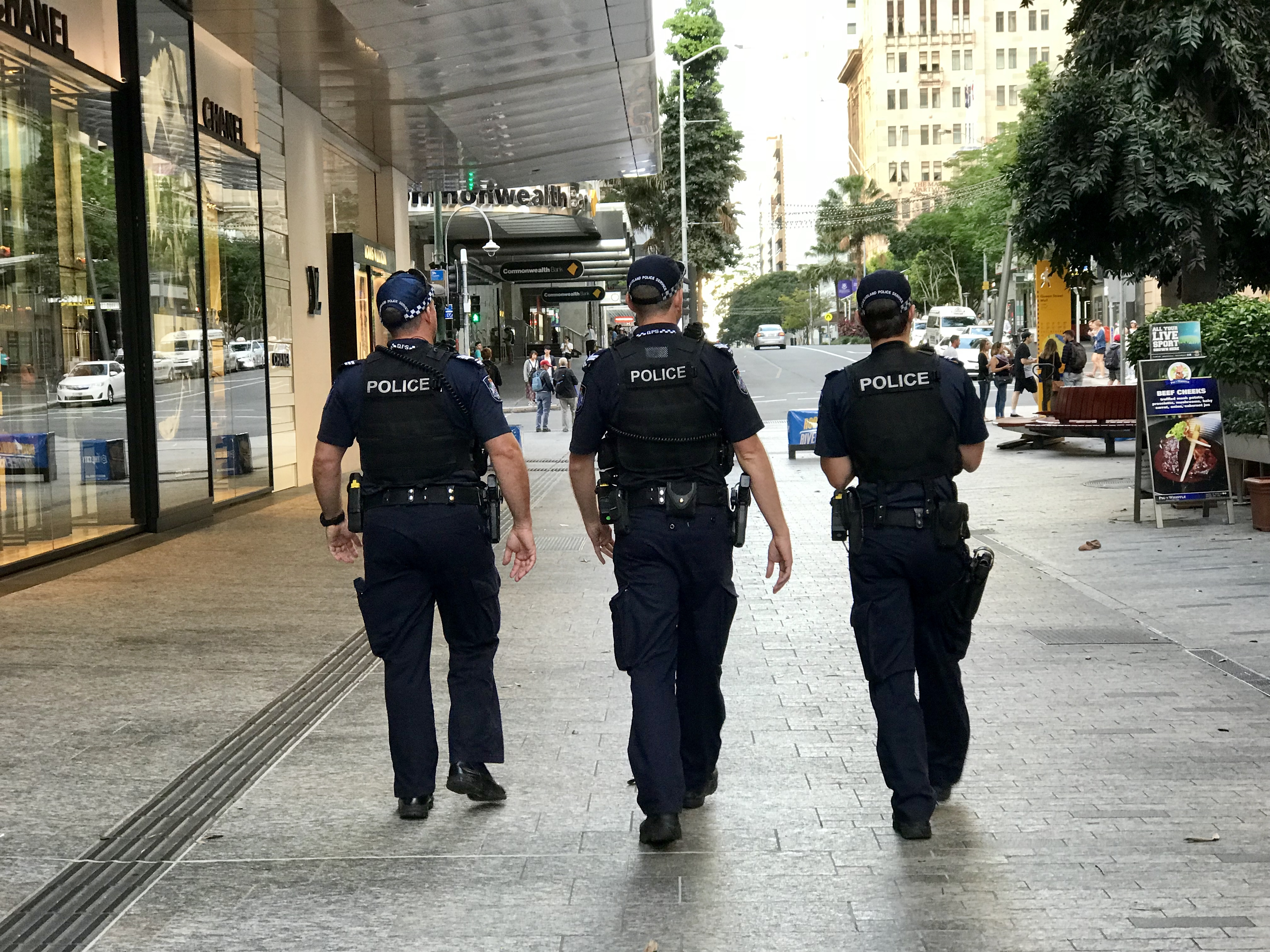
Queensland Police Service officers patrolling in Brisbane

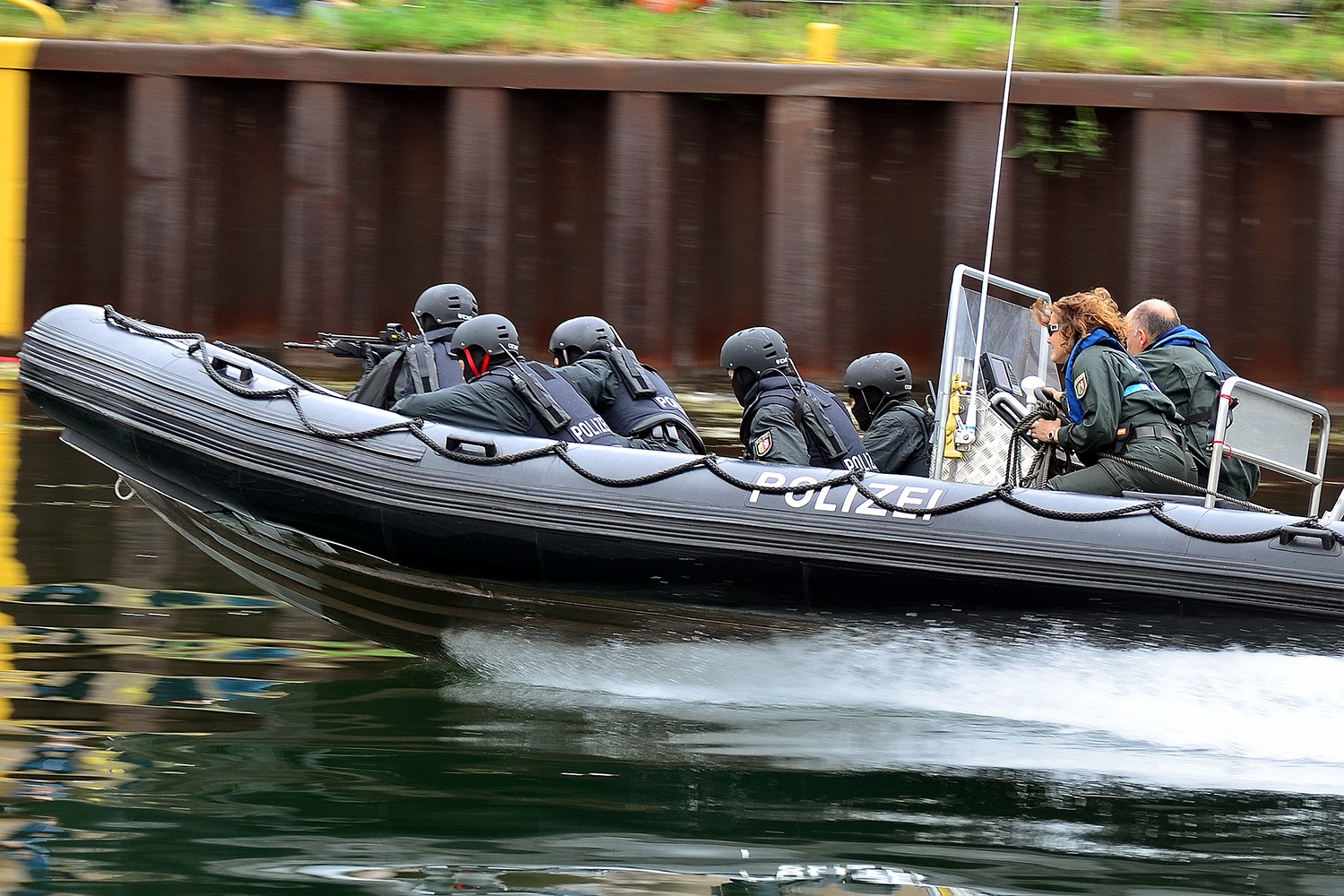
SEK members of the North Rhine-Westphalia Police, Germany during an exercise

State police, provincial police or regional police are a type of sub-national territorial police force found in nations organized as federations, typically in North America, South Asia, and Oceania. These forces typically have jurisdiction over the relevant sub-national jurisdiction, and may cooperate in law enforcement activities with municipal or national police where either exist.

== Argentina ==
In Argentina, as a federal country, each province has its own independent police force and its responsible of its funding, training and equipment. State police agencies are responsible of all the territory of a determinate state. There is almost no municipal/local law enforcement in Argentina, and if there is, they are generally limited to traffic duties.

== Australia ==
Prior to the Federation of Australia, each colony within Australia had numerous police forces, but these were largely amalgamated well before federation.

Today each state of Australia, as well as the Northern Territory, has its own state police force. Municipalities do not have police forces and it is left to the state forces to police all geographic areas within their respective states. Australia does have a national police force, the Australian Federal Police, whose role is to enforce the laws of the Commonwealth, both criminal law and civil law, as well as to protect the interests of the Commonwealth, both domestically and internationally. The AFP does, however, provide policing for the Australian Capital Territory, Jervis Bay Territory, and Australia's other external territories such as Norfolk Island, Christmas Island and the Cocos (Keeling) Islands.

The state and territory police forces are:

- New South Wales Police Force
- Northern Territory Police
- Queensland Police Service
- South Australia Police
- Tasmania Police
- Victoria Police
- Western Australia Police

== Brazil ==
Each federative unit in Brazil, beside its military firefighters corps and its penal and scientific polices, has two main police corporations working together with different skills:

Civil Police — The nonuniformed judiciary police, mainly responsible for investigating criminal offenses occurring in their territories. They're mainly based on Delegates (necessarily bachelors of laws), Clerks, Investigators and/or Agents and also responds for its Scientific Polices (responsible for forensic science activities and services) in the Federal District and other 8 states.
Military Police — The uniformed and militarily hierarchical police officers perform, under a gendarmerie system, police functions of patrolling, approaching and capturing, also serving as reserve branches of the Brazilian Armed Forces (more specifically its Brazilian Army). They make up the majority of the police force in Brazil, but don't perform regular military police functions (as they're reservedly performed by Brazilian Army Police Offices on duty, such as the Army Police (Brazil)) because they're primarily subordinated to its governors. In São Paulo, the Military Police also operates its Military Firefighters Corps. In Rio Grande do Sul, in turn, such office is called Military Brigade (Brigada Militar) instead of Military Police partially due to the long period for which also responded for its Military Firefighters Corps (which separated from BMRS in 2013).

- PCAC - Civil Police of Acre State
- PMAC - Military Police of Acre State
- PCAL - Civil Police of Alagoas State
- PMAL - Military Police of Alagoas State
- PCAP - Civil Police of Amapá State
- PMAP - Military Police of Amapá State
- PCAM - Civil Police of Amazonas State
- PMAM - Military Police of Amazonas State
- PCBA - Civil Police of Bahia State
- PMBA - Military Police of Bahia State
- PCCE - Civil Police of Ceará State
- PMCE - Military Police of Ceará State
- PCDF - Civil Police of the Federal District
- PMDF - Military Police of the Federal District
- PCES - Civil Police of Espírito Santo State
- PMES - Military Police of Espírito Santo State
- PCGO - Civil Police of Goiás State
- PMGO - Military Police of Goiás State
- PCMA - Civil Police of Maranhão State
- PMMA - Military Police of Maranhão State
- PCMT - Civil Police of Mato Grosso State
- PMMT - Military Police of Estado do Mato Grosso State
- PCMS - Civil Police of Mato Grosso do Sul State
- PMMS - Military Police of Mato Grosso do Sul State
- PCMG - Civil Police of Minas Gerais State
- PMMG - Military Police of Minas Gerais State
- PCPA - Civil Police of Pará State
- PMPA - Military Police of Pará State
- PCPB - Civil Police of Paraíba State
- PMPB - Military Police of Paraíba State
- PCPR - Civil Police of Paraná State
- PMPR - Military Police of Paraná State
- PCPE - Civil Police of Pernambuco State
- PMPE - Military Police of Pernambuco State
- PCPI - Civil Police of Piauí State
- PMPI - Military Police of Piauí State
- PCERJ - Civil Police of Rio de Janeiro State
- PMERJ - Military Police of Rio de Janeiro State
- PCRN - Civil Police of Rio Grande do Norte State
- PMRN - Military Police of Rio Grande do Norte State
- PCRS - Civil Police of Rio Grande do Sul State
- BMRS - Military Brigade of Rio Grande do Sul State
- PCRO - Civil Police of Rondônia State
- PMRO - Military Police of Rondônia State
- PCRR - Civil Police of Roraima State
- PMRR - Military Police of Roraima State
- PCSC - Civil Police of Santa Catarina State
- PMSC - Military Police of Santa Catarina State
- PCESP - Civil Police of São Paulo State
- PMESP - Military Police of São Paulo State
- PCSE - Civil Police of Sergipe State
- PMSE - Military Police of Sergipe State
- PCTO - Civil Police of Tocantins State
- PMTO - Military Police of Tocantins State

== Canada ==
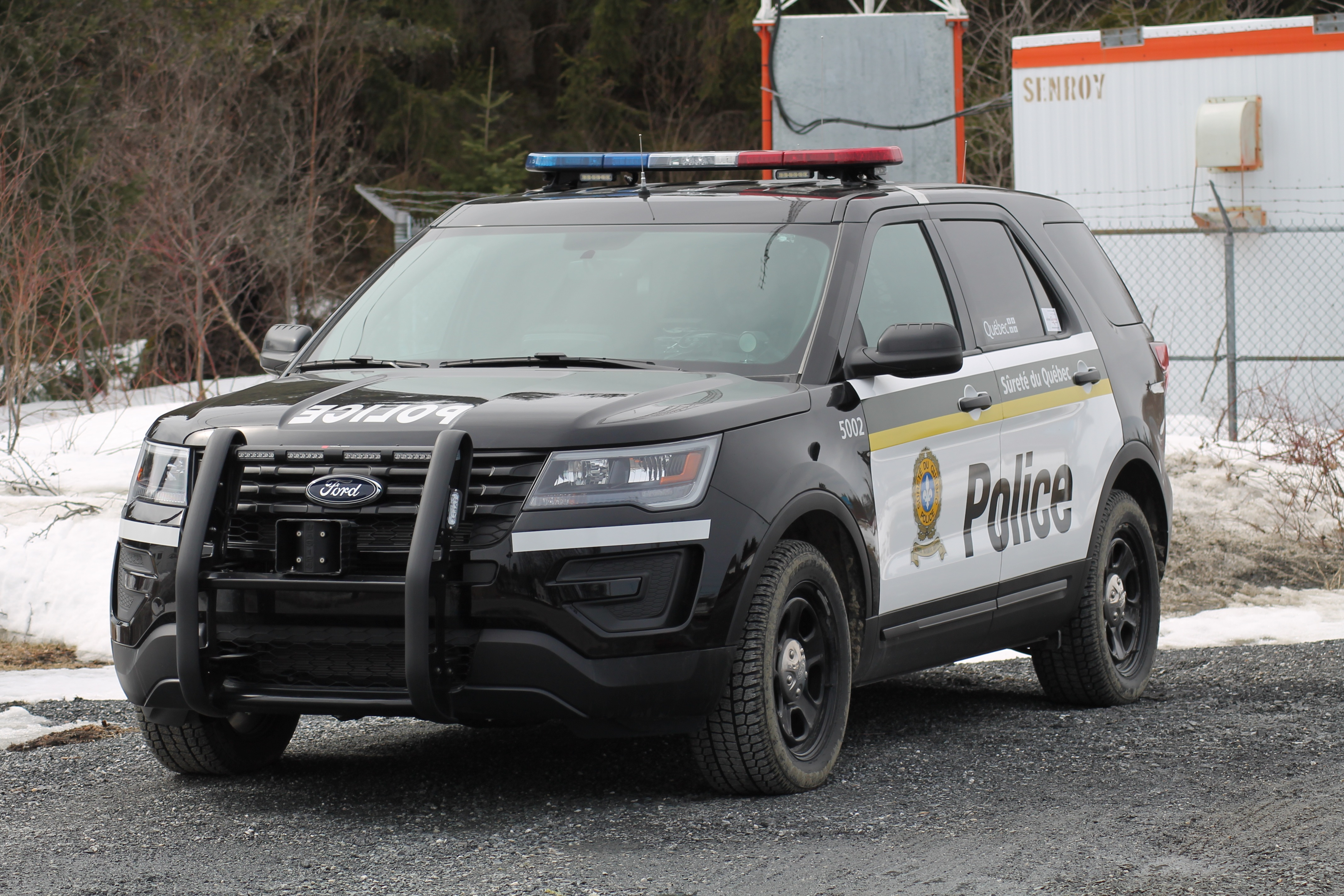
Sûreté du Québec cruiser

Law enforcement in Canada operates at the federal, provincial, and local levels. Five provinces of Canada have a dedicated police force, with jurisdiction over some or all of the province:

- Ontario Provincial Police (Ontario)
- Royal Newfoundland Constabulary (Newfoundland and Labrador)
- Sûreté du Québec (Quebec)
- Saskatchewan Marshals Service (Saskatchewan)
- Alberta Sheriffs Police Service (Alberta)

The federal Royal Canadian Mounted Police (RCMP) provides provincial-level policing in the remaining land area of Newfoundland and Labrador, as well as the remaining seven provinces and three territories. The RCMP began being contracted to provide provincial policing in the late 1920s as provincial police forces were disbanded and their duties contracted out to provincial divisions of the RCMP. The most recent provincial police force to be disbanded, the British Columbia Provincial Police, existed from the mid-19th century until its jurisdiction was transferred to RCMP "E" Division on August 15, 1950.

Provinces which have disbanded their provincial police may retain other provincial law enforcement agencies, such as sheriff services or conservation officers. For example, the Alberta Sheriffs Branch is responsible for traffic enforcement in Alberta together with the RCMP, despite being a law enforcement agency and not a police force, although there have been plans to create a new provincial police service "under the sheriffs".

== Germany ==
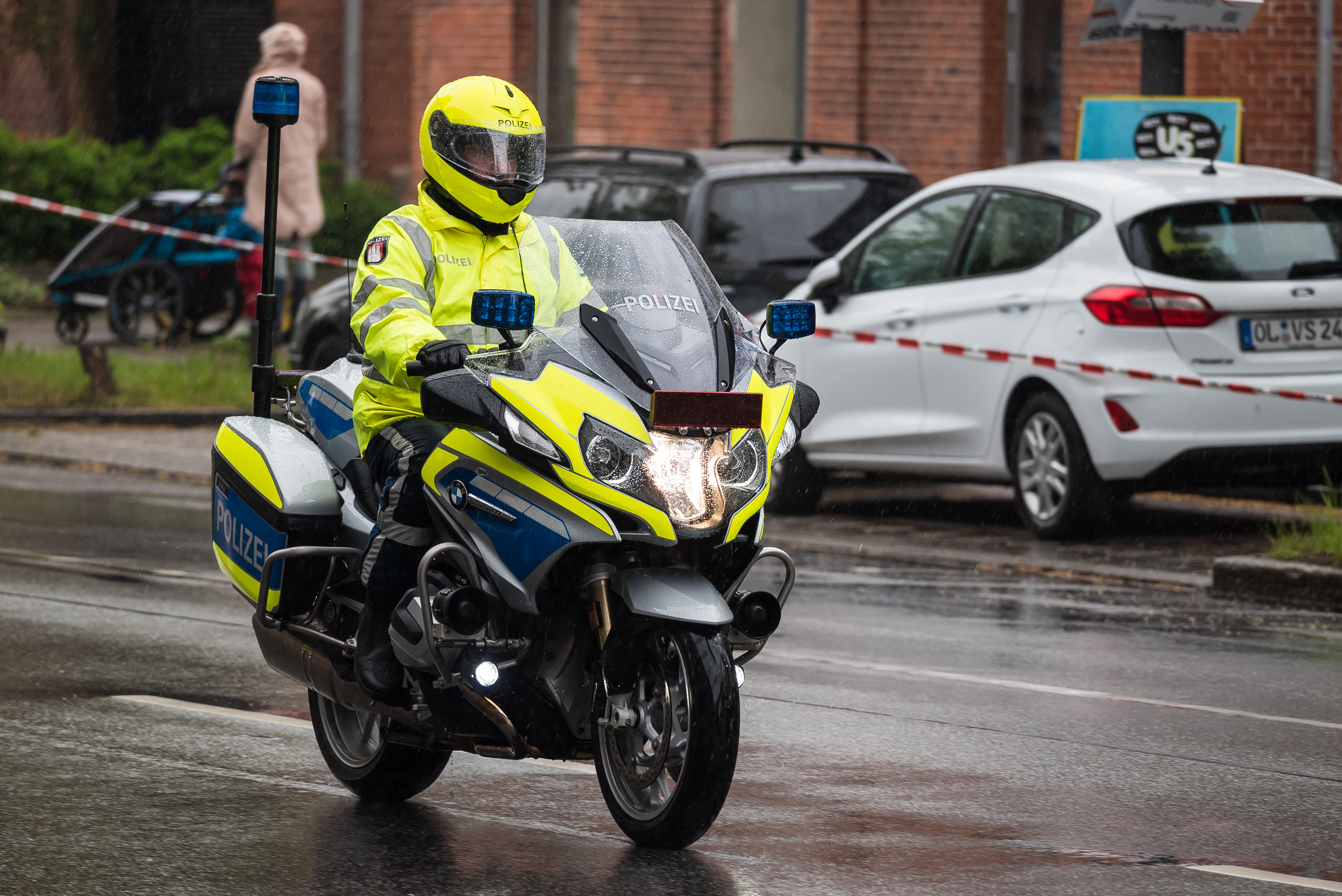
Hamburg Police motorcycle officer

The Landespolizei (or LaPo) is a term used in the Federal Republic of Germany to denote the law enforcement services that perform law enforcement duties in the states of Germany. The German federal constitution leaves the majority of law enforcement responsibilities to the 16 states of the country.

- Baden-Württemberg Police
- Bavarian State Police
- Berlin Police
- Brandenburg Police
- Bremen Police
- Hamburg Police
- Hesse State Police
- Lower Saxony Police
- Mecklenburg-Vorpommern Police
- North Rhine-Westphalia Police
- Rhineland-Palatinate Police
- Saarland Police
- Saxony Police
- Saxony-Anhalt Police
- Schleswig-Holstein Police
- Thuringia Police

There also are several auxiliary state police forces.

- Baden-Württemberg Voluntary Police Service
- Bavarian Security Watch
- Brandenburg Security Partner
- Hesse Voluntary Police Service
- Saxony Security Watch

== Italy ==
The Polizia di Stato (State Police), law enforcement in Italy.

== India ==
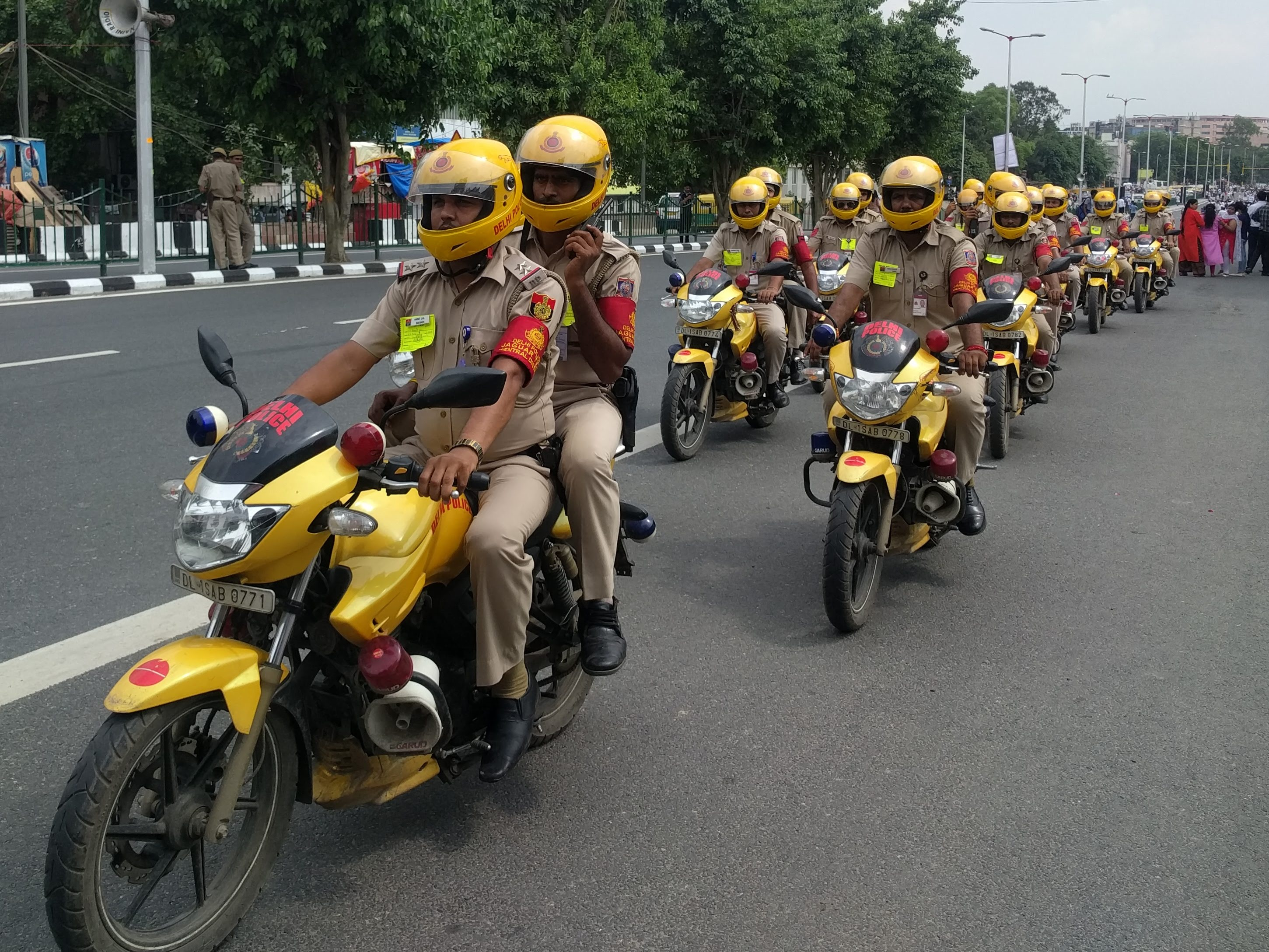
The "Jaguar" Team of the Delhi Police

The Constitution of India delineates the roles and responsibilities of both the central and state governments, with matters related to police, public order, and law and order falling under the purview of the state governments. India has 28 state police agencies.

Each state has a state police force and its own distinct state police services, headed by the director general of police (DGP) or commissioner of police (in metropolitan areas), who is an Indian Police Service officer. The state police forces operate under the authority of the respective state governments and are empowered to enforce laws, prevent crime, investigate offenses, and maintain public order.

Most municipal or city police agencies operate under their respective state police departments, with the exception of the Kolkata Police. State police agencies typically have jurisdiction across the entire state. However, in West Bengal, the jurisdiction of the state police excludes Kolkata, which is served by the Kolkata Police.

The police forces of union territories in India are either directly or indirectly under the purview of the Union Government. Unlike state police forces, the Delhi Police operate under the direct control of the Union Ministry of Home Affairs, Government of India due to Delhi's status as both the national capital territory and a union territory. While they function under the respective union territory administrations for day-to-day operations and governance, their ultimate authority and oversight lie with the central government.

The Indian Police Service (IPS) is not a law enforcement agency in its own right; rather it is the body to which all senior police officers of all states belong regardless of the agency for whom they work. The IPS officers provide senior level leadership to law enforcement agencies, both at the state and federal levels.

List of Indian state police agencies
SrNo	State	Police emblem	Police force
1	Andhra Pradesh		Andhra Pradesh Police
2	Arunachal Pradesh		Arunachal Pradesh Police
3	Assam		Assam Police
4	Bihar		Bihar Police
5	Chhattisgarh		Chhattisgarh Police
6	Goa		Goa Police
7	Gujarat		Gujarat Police
8	Haryana		Haryana Police
9	Himachal Pradesh		Himachal Pradesh Police
10	Jharkhand		Jharkhand Police
11	Karnataka		Karnataka State Police
12	Kerala		Kerala Police
13	Madhya Pradesh		Madhya Pradesh Police
14	Maharashtra		Maharashtra Police
15	Manipur		Manipur Police
16	Meghalaya		Meghalaya Police
17	Mizoram		Mizoram Police
18	Nagaland		Nagaland Police
19	Odisha		Odisha Police
20	Punjab		Punjab Police
21	Rajasthan		Rajasthan Police
22	Sikkim		Sikkim Police
23	Tamil Nadu		Tamil Nadu Police
24	Telangana		Telangana State Police
25	Tripura		Tripura Police
26	Uttar Pradesh		Uttar Pradesh Police
27	Uttarakhand		Uttarakhand Police
28	West Bengal		West Bengal Police

== Mexico ==
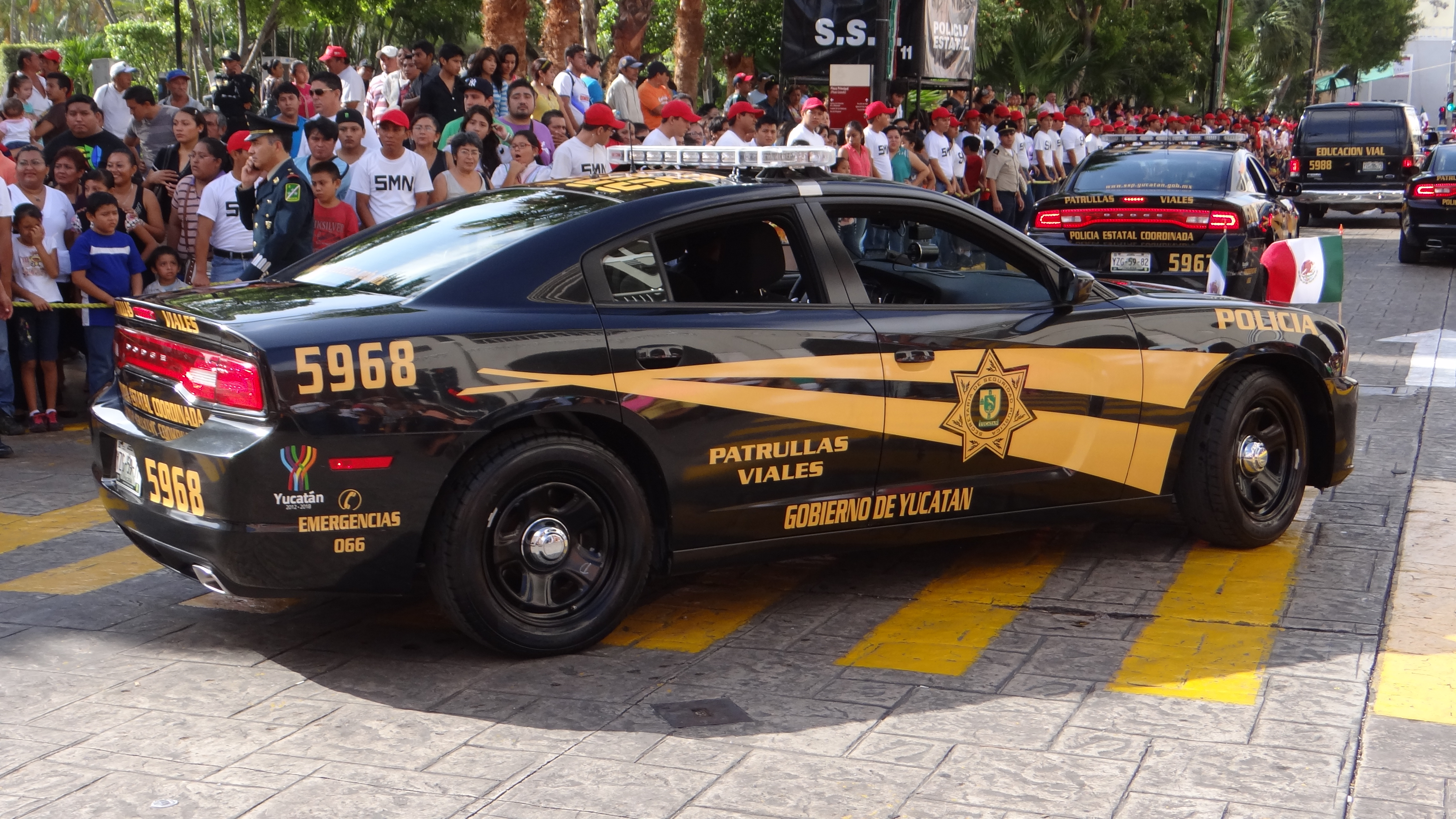
Dodge Charger of the Yucatán State Police

Each of the 32 states of Mexico maintains a separate law enforcement agency or Policía Estatal. Each of these state forces is tasked with the protection of their citizens, keeping local order and combating insecurity and drug trafficking. Certain states including Veracruz and Nuevo León have a new model of police force designated as civilian forces (Fuerza Civil).

- Aguascalientes State Police
- Baja California State Police
- Baja California Sur State Police
- Campeche State Police
- Chiapas State Police
- Chihuahua State Police
- Coahuila State Police
- Colima State Police
- Durango State Police
- Guanajuato State Police
- Guerrero State Police
- Hidalgo State Police
- Jalisco State Police
- Mexico City Police, a special case in both state and municipal duties throughout the 16 Boroughs of Mexico City
- State of Mexico Police
- Michoacán State Police (Replaced in 2020 with Michoacán State Highway Patrol)
- Morelos State Police
- Nayarit State Police
- Nuevo León Civil Force
- Oaxaca State Police
- Puebla State Police
- Querétaro State Police
- Quintana Roo State Police
- San Luis Potosí Guardia Civil Estatal (State Civil Guard)
- Sinaloa State Police
- Sonora State Police
- Tabasco State Police
- Tamaulipas State Police
- Tlaxcala State Police
- Veracruz State Police (Replaced with civil force in 2014)
- Yucatán State Police
- Zacatecas State Police

== Spain ==
In Spain there are autonomous police forces in four of its seventeen autonomous communities and two cities.

- Ertzainas in the Basque Country
- Mossos d'Esquadra in Catalonia
- Policía Foral in Navarre
- Policía Canaria in the Canary Islands

Apart from this, some autonomous communities (Andalusia, Aragon, Asturias, Galicia and Valencian Community) have a special division part of the National Police Corps and autonomous government of each community.

== United States ==
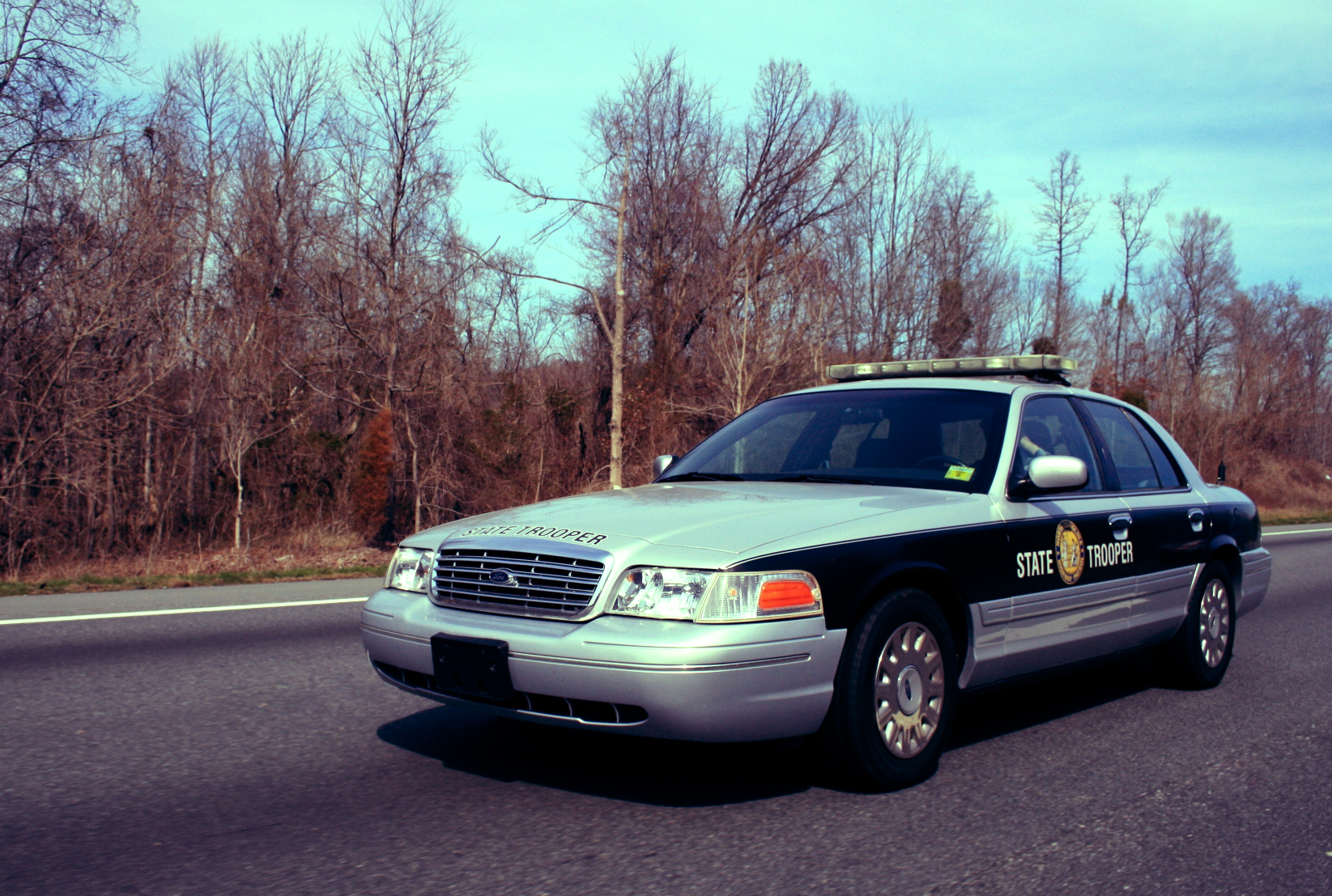
North Carolina State Highway Patrol cruiser on I-85 in 2008

In the United States, state police (also termed highway patrol, state patrol, or state highway patrol), or state troopers, are a police body unique to 49 of the U.S. states, having statewide authority to conduct law enforcement activities and criminal investigations. Hawaii, despite a widely dispersed archipelago and having four separate county-based police agencies, still has its own statewide policing agency.

In general, these police agencies perform functions outside the jurisdiction of the county sheriff, such as enforcing traffic laws on state highways and interstate expressways, overseeing the security of the state capitol complex, protecting the governor, training new officers for local police forces too small to operate an academy, providing technological and scientific services, supporting local police and helping to coordinate multi-jurisdictional task force activity in serious or complicated cases in those states that grant full police powers statewide. In some rural states, they may be responsible for the majority of 911 call responses. A general trend has been to bring all of these agencies under a state department of public safety. Additionally, they may serve under different state departments such as the highway patrol under the state department of transportation and the marine patrol under the state department of natural resources.

Twenty-three U.S. states use the term state police, fifteen use the term highway patrol, seven use the term state patrol, and three use the term state highway patrol, while Alaska's agency is the "Division of Alaska State Troopers". The term highway patrol tends to be more common in the southeast and mountain west states. Hawaii is the only state with a Sheriff Division of the Hawaii Department of Law Enforcement with statewide jurisdiction.

- Alabama Highway Patrol
- Alaska State Troopers
- Arizona Highway Patrol
- Arkansas State Police
- California Highway Patrol
- Colorado State Patrol
- Connecticut State Police
- Delaware State Police
- Florida Highway Patrol
- Georgia State Patrol
- Hawaii State Sheriff
- Idaho State Police
- Illinois State Police
- Indiana State Police
- Iowa State Patrol
- Kansas Highway Patrol
- Kentucky State Police
- Louisiana State Police
- Maine State Police
- Maryland State Police
- Massachusetts State Police
- Michigan State Police
- Minnesota State Patrol
- Mississippi Highway Patrol
- Missouri State Highway Patrol
- Montana Highway Patrol
- Nebraska State Patrol
- Nevada State Police
- New Hampshire State Police
- New Jersey State Police
- New Mexico State Police
- New York State Police
- North Carolina State Highway Patrol
- North Dakota Highway Patrol
- Ohio State Highway Patrol
- Oklahoma Highway Patrol
- Oregon State Police
- Pennsylvania State Police
- Rhode Island State Police
- South Carolina Highway Patrol
- South Dakota Highway Patrol
- Tennessee Highway Patrol
- Texas Highway Patrol
- Utah Highway Patrol
- Vermont State Police
- Virginia State Police
- Washington State Patrol
- West Virginia State Police
- Wisconsin State Patrol
- Wyoming Highway Patrol

In addition, the Federal district and all territories of the United States have a police force with similar territory-wide authority:

District of Columbia:

- Metropolitan Police Department of the District of Columbia

United States territories:

- American Samoa Department of Public Safety
- Guam Police Department
- Northern Mariana Islands Department of Public Safety
- Puerto Rico Police
- U.S. Virgin Islands Police Department

== See also ==
- Border guard
- Highway patrol
- Traffic police
- Traffic warden
