= Germantown Police Department =

Police department in Tennessee, U.S.

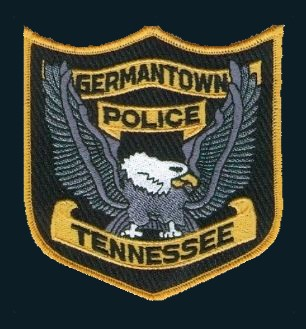
- Germantown, TN Police Department Shoulder Patch
- Abbreviation: GPD

Jurisdictional structure
- Operations jurisdiction: Germantown, Tennessee, United States
- Legal jurisdiction: Germantown, Tennessee
- General nature: Local civilian police

Operational structure
- Headquarters: 1930 S Germantown Rd, Germantown, TN 38138
- Officers: 112
- Elected officer responsible: Mike Palazzolo, Mayor of Germantown, Tennessee
- Agency executive: Mike Fisher, Chief of Police
- Divisions: Uniformed Patrol Investigations Police Services

Website
- https://www.germantown-tn.gov/police

Germantown Police vehicle

The Germantown Police Department is the law enforcement agency of the city of Germantown, Tennessee, United States. The department was established in 1955.

Germantown Police Department has earned accreditation through the Tennessee Law Enforcement Accreditation Program, a program created and managed by the Tennessee Association of Chiefs of Police.

== Organization ==
=== Uniform Patrol Division ===
The Uniform Patrol division is the largest division within the Germantown Police Department. Responsibilities of the Uniform Patrol Division include: 24-hour patrols by uniformed officers; DUI enforcement; running the Critical Injury Crash Investigation Team; Canine Unit; Drone Unit; and SWAT team.

=== Investigations Division ===
The Criminal Investigations Division is responsible for conducting follow-up investigations to crimes reported to the Germantown Police Department. Responsibilities of the Investigations Division include: comprehensive investigations of reported criminal activity, crime scene processing and collection; evidence preservation and storage; crime and trend analysis; records management and data entry.

=== Police Services Division ===
The Police Services Division has the following responsibilities; administering and coordinating community relations; training; running the communications center; running the jail; running the reserve officer program; running the citizen police academy program; employee hiring and recruitment; and administering the Neighborhood Watch program and special events. It also manages School Resources Officers and School Crossing Guards, and the Communications Center. The Communications Center is responsible for dispatching all police, fire and EMS calls and monitoring police and fire radios. The Communications Center is the answering point for the city’s 911 calls. Personnel in this department also perform jail duties including processing prisoners, maintaining jail records and ensuring prisoner security and safety.

== Rank structure ==
| Title | Insignia |
|---|---|
| Chief of Police | |
| Deputy Chief | |
| Inspector | |
| Captain | |
| Lieutenant | |
| Detective | |
| Police Officer | |

== See also ==
- List of law enforcement agencies in Tennessee
