= Yucatán State Police =

Yucatán State Police Secretaría de Seguridad Pública del Estado de Yucatán
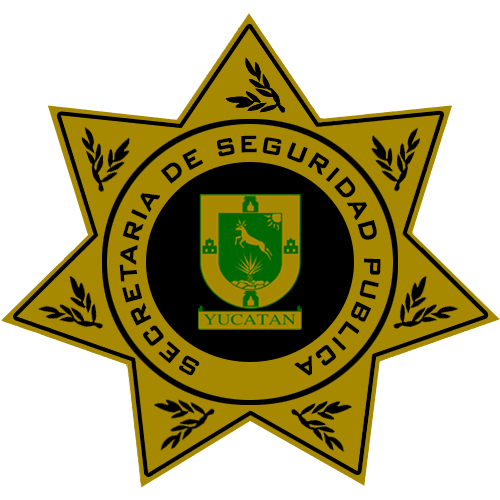
- Vehicle Door Decal of the State Police

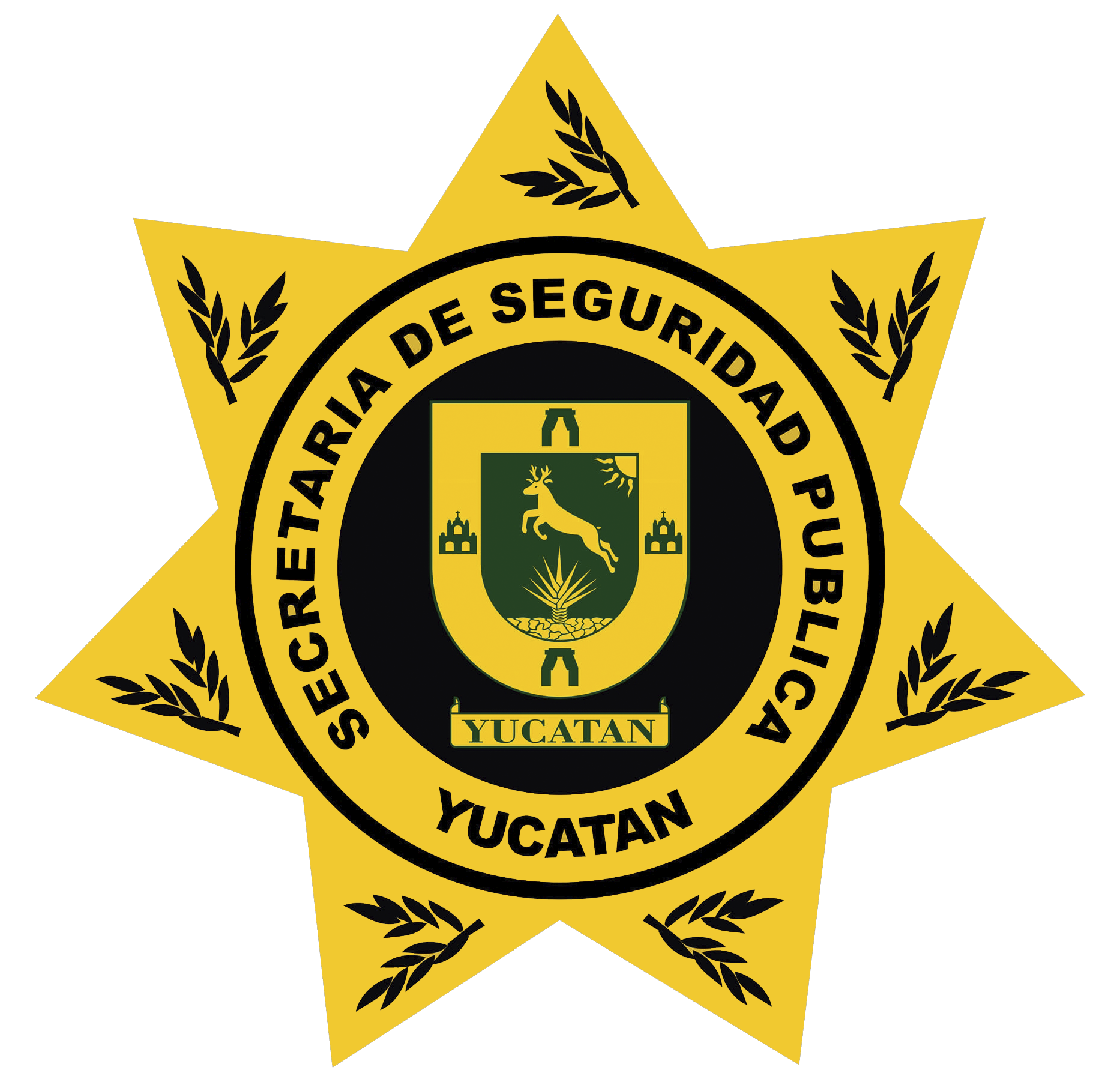
- Logo the Yucatán State Police

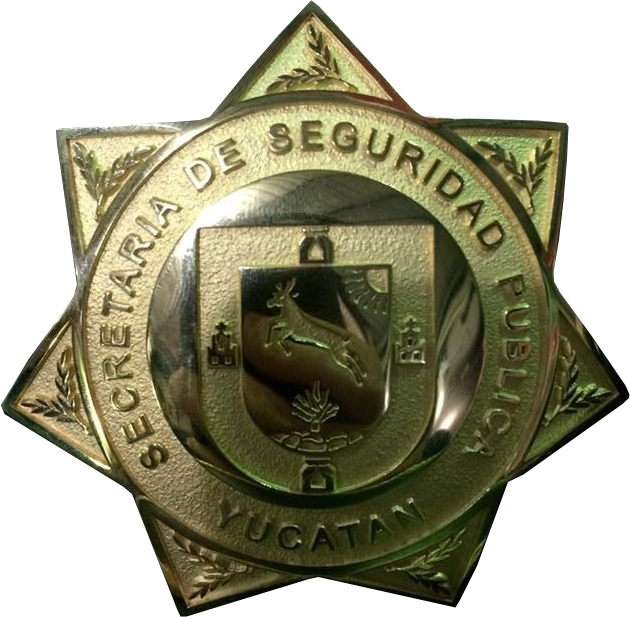
- Badge of the State Police
- Common name: Policía Estatal de Yucatán
- Abbreviation: SSP

Agency overview
- Employees: ~ 3200+ employees (as of November 2021)
- Volunteers: 0
- Annual budget: $ 3,609,089,519.00 MXN (2023 budget)

Jurisdictional structure
- Operations jurisdiction: MEX
- Map of the State of Yucatán and its municipalities.
- Area: 39,524 square kilometres (15,260 sq mi)
- Population: 2,320,898 (2020)
- Legal jurisdiction: State of Yucatán, Mexico
- General nature: Local civilian police

Operational structure
- Headquarters: Mérida, Yucatán
- Agency executive: Luis Felipe Saidén Ojeda, Secretary of Public Safety

Facilities
- Patrol cars: ~ 1,395 vehicles
- Boats: ~ 4 Grady & White and 4 Defender-class boat (Total 8)
- Planes: Bell 407, Bell 429

Website
- www.ssp.yucatan.gob.mx (in Spanish)

The Yucatán State Police (In Spanish: Policía estatal de Yucatán) is a Mexican law enforcement agency which operates public safety services, traffic enforcement and social prevention of the delict in the state of Yucatán. The State Police is a division of the Department of Public Safety of Yucatán (Secretaría de Seguridad Pública, in Spanish), a centralized organism of the state government. Its current chief is General Commissioner Luis Felipe Saidén Ojeda, since 2007. Its headquarters are located in the western city of Mérida.

== Vehicles ==
As of 2015, the State Police had 1,365 vehicles including cars, pick-ups, ambulances, boats, a helicopter and a plane.

| Vehicle | Country | Type | Notes | Image |
|---|---|---|---|---|
| Dodge Avenger | United States | Police car | | |
| Dodge Charger | United States | Police car | | |
| Ford Police Interceptor | United States | Police car | | |
| Chevrolet Tahoe | United States | SUV | | |
| Dodge Durango | United States | SUV | | |
| Ford Explorer | United States | SUV | | |
| FL-EGP Harley-Davidson | United States | Motorbike | | |
| Dodge Dakota | United States | Pick-up | | |
| Dodge RAM | United States | Pick-up | | |
| Nissan Frontier | United States | Pick-up | | |
| Nissan Titan | United States | Pick-up | | |
| Ford E-350 | United States | Van | There are armoured versions. | |
| Ford Transit | United States | Van | | |
| Bell 407 | United States | Helicopter | | |

== Ranks and insignia ==
The State Police ranks are organized in: (from highest to lowest)

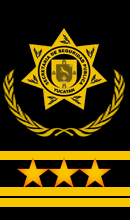
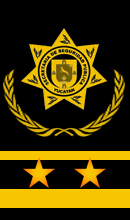
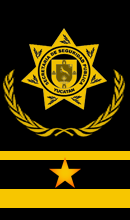
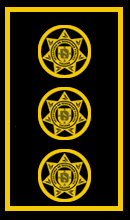
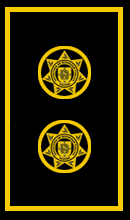
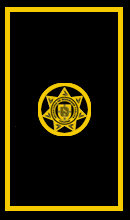
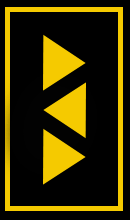
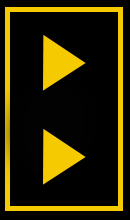
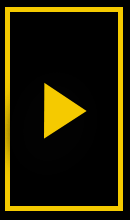
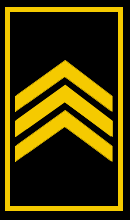
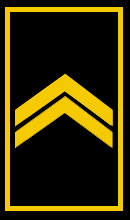
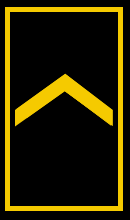
| | High-Command | | | Inspectors | | | Officers | | | Basic ranks |
|---|---|---|---|---|---|---|---|---|---|---|---|---|---|
| State of Yucatan |
| State of Yucatan | Secretary/Chief | Undersecretary | Director | 1st Inspector | 2nd Inspector | Subinspector | 1st Officer | 2nd Officer | Subofficer | First police | Second police | Third police | Police agent |

== Secretaries of Public Safety ==
Before 2008, the Department of Public Safety was known as Department of Roads and Protection.

- (2018 - 2021): Luis Felipe Saidén Ojeda (current)
- (2012 - 2018): Luis Felipe Saidén Ojeda
- (2007 - 2012): Luis Felipe Saidén Ojeda
- (2001 - 2007): Javier Medina Torre
- (1995 - 2001): Luis Felipe Saidén Ojeda
- (1993 - 1995): ?
- (1991 - 1993): Federico Cuesy Adrián
- (1988 - 1991): Henry Boldo Osorio
- (1984 - 1988): ?

== See also ==
- Yucatán (state)
- State police
