= Sevierville Police Department =

Jurisdictional structure
- Legal jurisdiction: City of Sevierville

Operational structure
- Sworn members: 81 (July 1, 2025)
- Unsworn members: 19
- Agency executive: Joseph Manning, Chief of Police
- Bureaus: 3: Operations Bureau; Support Bureau; Special Operations

Website
- Official website

The Sevierville Police Department, sometimes referred to as SPD, is the primary law enforcement organization serving Sevierville, Tennessee, United States.

== Operations Bureau ==
The Operations Bureau contains the Patrol Division, which is the primary uniformed division of the department, which includes vehicle and bicycle patrols. The Operations Bureau Commander, a Captain, also oversees the department's special operations, including SWAT, Bomb Team, and Crash Reconstruction.

Currently, the Patrol Division operates using a 12-hour shift model and staffs four patrol shifts. Each shift is supervised by a lieutenant, aided by two sergeants.

The Operations Bureau also contains the Criminal Investigations Division, which is commanded by a Lieutenant with the assistance of two Sergeants.

== Support Bureau ==
This Bureau includes the Community Resource Unit, Traffic Unit, K-9 Unit, School Resource Officers, Reserve Officers, Communications, and Records.

== Rank structure ==
Title	Insignia
Chief of Police	
Deputy Chief
Captain	
Lieutenant	
Sergeant	
Police Officer/Detective	

== See also ==
- List of law enforcement agencies in Tennessee
