= Bartlett Police Department =

Law enforcement agency of Bartlett, Tennessee, U.S.

- Abbreviation: BPD

Jurisdictional structure
- Operations jurisdiction: Bartlett, Tennessee, USA
- Legal jurisdiction: Bartlett, Tennessee
- General nature: Local civilian police

Operational structure
- Headquarters: 3730 Appling Road, Bartlett, TN 38133
- Elected officer responsible: A. Keith McDonald, Mayor of Bartlett, Tennessee
- Agency executive: Glen Williamson, Chief of Police
- Bureaus: 2: Operations; Administration
- Divisions: 4: Patrol; Criminal Investigations; Community Services; Support Services

Website
- www.cityofbartlett.org/68/Police-Department

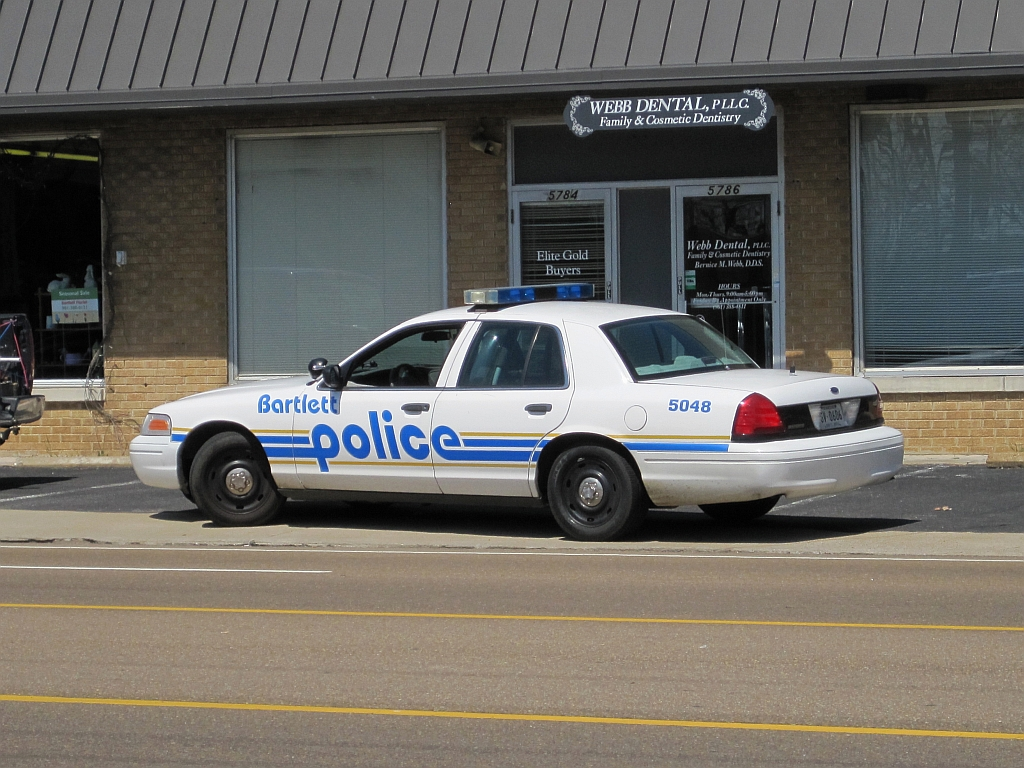
A Bartlett police cruiser in 2013

The Bartlett Police Department is the law enforcement agency of the city of Bartlett, Tennessee, United States.

== Organization ==
=== Patrol/Traffic Division ===
The Patrol division is responsible for providing patrol coverage 24 hours per day. The division also conducts preliminary investigations and apprehends suspects.

Special units within the division include: the Motors Unit, consisting of officers given motorcycles to enforce traffic laws and respond to accidents; the Canine Unit, consisting of three Canine Teams; the Bike Patrol; the Honor Guard; the Reserve Unit and the S.W.A.T. team.

=== Investigative Services Division ===
The Investigative Services Division is responsible for investigating crimes. The Investigative Services Division of the Bartlett Police Department is divided into two separate sections: General Investigations and Narcotics. A portion of the officers assigned to General Investigations specialize in financial crimes.

=== Communications/Jail Division ===
The Communications/Jail Division is divided into two sections: communications and jail. The communications section is responsible for handling incoming calls for service for the police department as well as for the fire and emergency medical services. Personnel assigned to the communications section are required to be trained to fill in as jailers. The jail section is responsible for running the city's jail.

=== Records Division ===
The Records Division is responsible for the storage of all police reports, accident reports, and special files that involve some action regarding police activity.

=== Public Information and Education Division ===
The Public Information and Education Division is responsible for: the Neighborhood Watch Program; the School Resource Officers and D.A.R.E. Program; the School Crossing Guards; the Safety Education Program; the Citizens Police Academy; the Youth Citizens Police Academy; and the Volunteers in Police Services (VIPS) program.

== Rank structure ==
Title	Insignia
Chief of Police	
Assistant Chief	
Captain	
Lieutenant	
Detective	
Police Officer	

== See also ==
- List of law enforcement agencies in Tennessee
