= Germantown, Tennessee =

- City
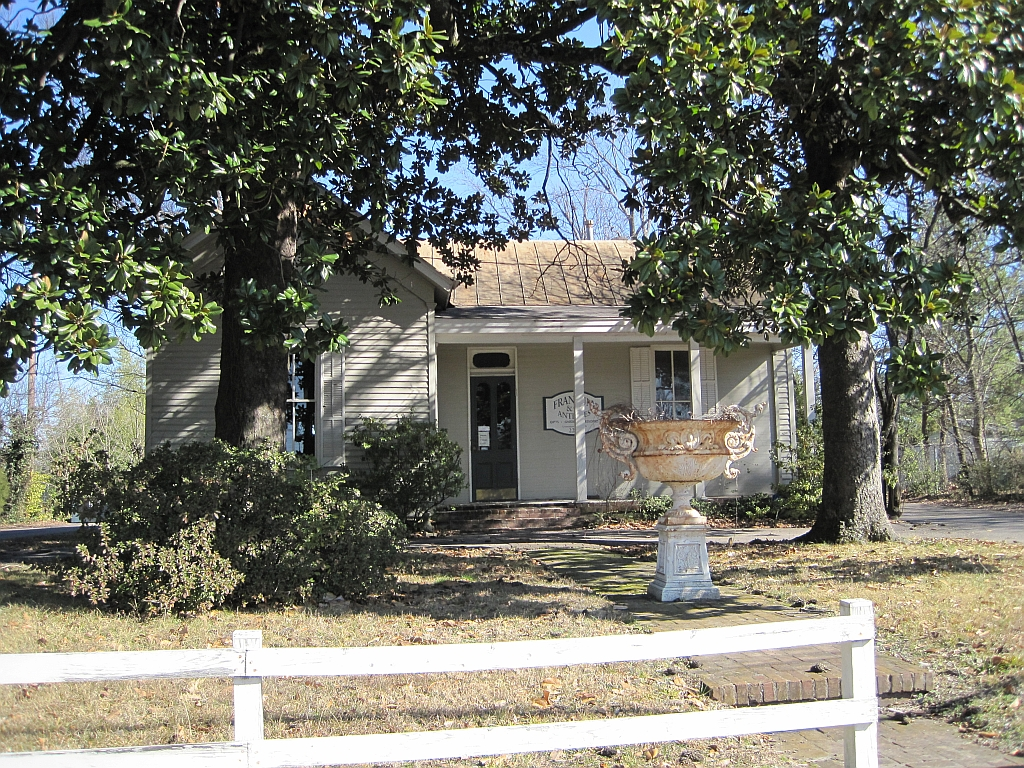
- Historic downtown Germantown

- Seal
- Interactive map of Germantown, Tennessee
- Location within Tennessee Location within the United States
- Coordinates: 35.0820°N 89.7826°W
- Country: United States
- State: Tennessee
- County: Shelby
- Founded: 1825
- Incorporated: 1841

Government
  - Type: Mayor–council
  - Mayor: Mike Palazzolo

Area
  - City: 20.012 sq mi (51.831 km^{2})
  - Land: 19.987 sq mi (51.767 km^{2})
  - Water: 0.025 sq mi (0.064 km^{2}) 0.12%
- Elevation: 318 ft (97 m)

Population (2020)
  - City: 41,333
  - Estimate (2024): 40,128
  - Rank: US: 1029th TN: 23rd
  - Density: 2,068.0/sq mi (798.44/km^{2})
  - Urban: 1,056,190 (US: 45th)
  - Metro: 1,341,412 (US: 45th)
- Time zone: UTC−6 (Central (CST))
  - Summer (DST): UTC−5 (CDT)
- ZIP Codes: 38138, 38139, 38183
- Area code: 901
- FIPS code: 47-28960
- GNIS feature ID: 2403693
- Website: germantown-tn.gov

Germantown is a city in Shelby County, Tennessee, United States. The population was 41,333 at the 2020 census, and was estimated at 40,128 in 2024, making it the 23rd-most populous city in Tennessee. It was given a Malcolm Baldrige National Quality Award for Performance Excellence in 2019.

Germantown is an eastern suburb of Memphis. Germantown was founded in 1841 by mostly German emigrants. The town hosts festivals year-round to celebrate their history and German culture. In the city center is the "Old Germantown" neighborhood, anchored by a railroad depot (a 1948 reproduction of the 1868 original) and railroad tracks that recall the community's earliest days of development as an outpost along the Memphis and Charleston Railroad.

The city hosts many horse shows and competitions annually, most notably the Germantown Charity Horse Show in June. Other major annual events include the Germantown Festival, an arts and crafts fair, in early September.

Germantown has the lowest crime rate for any city its size in the State of Tennessee. Its police and fire departments have average emergency response time of five minutes (police just under 3 minutes & fire department 5.4 minutes). The parks and recreation department is nationally accredited. The Arbor Day Foundation has designated Germantown a "Tree City USA" for 33 consecutive years. In December 2019, the U.S. Department of Commerce announced that the City of Germantown earned the 2019 Malcolm Baldrige National Quality Award. The city is one of only five municipalities nationwide to have ever received the award. Only 2.7% of Germantown citizens are below the poverty line.

== History ==
Germantown was founded along the Chickasaw Trace on a ridge between the Wolf River and Nonconnah Creek, about 16 miles (26 km) east of the Mississippi River.

The first settlers arrived in Germantown about 1825. Between 1825 and 1830, Miss Frances Wright established Nashoba Plantation, a utopian community intended to educate emancipated slaves and teach them a trade. By 1830, the first store was opened as more settlers moved into the area.

The community became known as Pea Ridge in 1833. Town lots were laid out in 1834 by surveyor N. T. German. The name was changed to Germantown in 1836. This coincidentally also reflected the settling of German families.

The town was incorporated in 1841. The Memphis-Charleston Railroad was built through the community in 1852. Germantown experienced setbacks through the period of the Civil War (1861–1865); the yellow fever epidemics reduced its population to a few hundred.

The town rebounded slowly. Churches destroyed in the war were rebuilt, schools were constructed and the population began to return around the turn of the century. The city name was briefly changed to Neshoba, a Chickasaw word meaning 'wolf', during World War I, because of widespread anti-German sentiment in the United States at that time.

During the twentieth century, the community derived its strength through involvement of citizens, as evidenced in the churches, garden clubs and civic organizations. The Poplar Pike Improvement Association and the Germantown Civic Club played vital roles in the physical and social development of the community.

In the last half of the century, after WWII the population grew from about 400 to more than 40,000. Over several decades, elected and civic leadership, with support of citizens, worked proactively to control suburban growth through development regulations, aesthetic controls and strategic planning efforts.

== Historical sites ==
"Old Germantown" is centered around the railroad depot in downtown Germantown on Germantown Road. This was chosen as a central location by settlers in the late 19th century due to its high ground and central location. The depot was rebuilt in 1948 to replace the original structure from 1868. The depot is now home to the Germantown Train Museum. There are signs to commemorate historical sites and parks in "Old Germantown."

Fort Germantown, located on Honey Tree Drive off of Poplar Pike, is listed in the National Register of Historic Places. It was at this site that 250 Union Soldiers built their fortification from the ground in order to guard the Memphis and Charleston railroad during the Civil War. Now, there are replicas of howitzer cannons to mark the fort.

The John Gray House, located in Municipal Park, is one of the oldest brick homes in Shelby County. Built prior to 1851, it was originally located in Eads, Tennessee, but was moved to Germantown in 1989 to prevent demolition.

== Geography ==
According to the United States Census Bureau, the city has a total area of 20.012 square miles (51.83 km^{2}), of which 19.987 square miles (51.77 km^{2}) is land and 0.025 square miles (0.065 km^{2}) (0.12%) is water.

== Government and politics ==
The City of Germantown operates under a Mayor-Alderman form of government. The mayor and five aldermen are elected for four year terms and are part-time positions. The Board of Mayor and Aldermen is the legislative and policy-making body of the city. The mayor does not vote except to break a tie. By charter, the mayor is the chief administrative officer; however, oversight of day-to-day management is assigned to a professional city administrator, appointed by the mayor but subject to board approval. Mike Palazzolo was elected as Mayor in November 2015 and re-elected in 2018.

More than 200 citizens annually volunteer their time, expertise and energy in service on the city's 20-plus advisory commissions and boards. Most appointments, made by the mayor and aldermen each December, are for one year terms; most groups meet monthly. Their responsibilities range from recommendations on City government matters and community interests to identifying opportunities, challenges and solutions to conducting special activities. The commissions are Audit, Beautification, Design Review, Economic Development, Education, Environmental, Financial, Athletic Club, Great Hall, Historic, Industrial Development, Neighborhood Preservation, Parks and Recreation, Personnel, Planning, Public Safety Education, Retirement Plan Administration, Other Postemployment Benefits, Senior Citizens, and Telecommunications. The boards are Zoning Appeals, Industrial Development and Library.

=== Political makeup ===
Germantown, Tennessee is a majority conservative suburban city and usually votes Republican in federal and statewide elections, consistent with voting patterns in eastern Shelby County’s suburban communities.

The city lies entirely within Tennessee's 8th congressional district, which is represented by Republican David Kustoff.

Germantown Presidential election results
| Year | Republican | Democratic | Third parties |
|---|---|---|---|
| 2024 | 62.24% 14,303 | 35.76% 8,218 | 1.99% 458 |
| 2020 | 62.47% 15,751 | 36.13% 9,109 | 1.40% 354 |
| 2016 | 66.12% 14,415 | 28.92% 6,305 | 4.96% 1,082 |

== Education ==
=== Public schools ===
Germantown is served by two school districts, Shelby County Schools and Germantown Municipal School District.

Elementary Schools: Farmington Elementary School, Forest Hill Elementary School, Dogwood Elementary School, Riverdale Elementary K-8 School (GMSD) and Germantown Elementary School (SCS)

Middle School: Houston Middle School, Riverdale Elementary K-8 School (GMSD) and Germantown Middle School (SCS)

High School: Houston High School: In 2015, Houston High School was rated by The Washington Post as one of America's Most Challenging High Schools. Germantown High School (SCS): Germantown High School is an International Baccalaureate School, Blue Ribbon School, and is one of the largest high schools in the state of Tennessee, rated as a Reward School in Tennessee for Growth and Achievement measured by perfect scores of 5 each of the past 5 years.

Jason Manuel, former principal of Houston Middle School, is Superintendent of Germantown Municipal Schools. The School Board consists of 5 at large, elected positions.

Germantown Elementary, Middle, and High School remain with the Shelby County Schools district, although they are located within the borders of the city of Germantown and continue to serve a large proportion of Germantown K-12 students as well as students from unincorporated Shelby County.

=== Private schools ===
- Daybreak Specialized School
- Evangelical Christian School
- Farmington Presbyterian
- Madonna Learning Center
- Our Lady of Perpetual Help Catholic School (preschool – 8th grade)
- St. George's Independent School
- The Bodine School
- The Phoenix School for Creative Learning
- Union University – Germantown

== Demographics ==
Historical population
| Census | Pop. | Note | %± |
|---|---|---|---|
| 1850 | 245 | | — |
| 1870 | 197 | | — |
| 1880 | 223 | | 13.2% |
| 1890 | 268 | | 20.2% |
| 1900 | 270 | | 0.7% |
| 1910 | 247 | | −8.5% |
| 1920 | 263 | | 6.5% |
| 1930 | 322 | | 22.4% |
| 1940 | 402 | | 24.8% |
| 1950 | 408 | | 1.5% |
| 1960 | 1,104 | | 170.6% |
| 1970 | 3,474 | | 214.7% |
| 1980 | 21,467 | | 517.9% |
| 1990 | 32,893 | | 53.2% |
| 2000 | 37,348 | | 13.5% |
| 2010 | 38,844 | | 4.0% |
| 2020 | 41,333 | | 6.4% |
| 2025 (est.) | 40,001 | ▼ | −3.2% |
U.S. Decennial Census; 2020 Census

According to realtor website Zillow, the average price of a home as of March 31, 2026, in Germantown is $485,879.

As of the 2024 American Community Survey, there were 15,568 estimated households in Germantown with an average of 2.60 persons per household. The city has a median household income of $149,920. Approximately 2.7% of the city's population lives at or below the poverty line. Germantown has an estimated 58.7% employment rate, with 71.9% of the population holding a bachelor's degree or higher and 98.3% holding a high school diploma. There were 16,106 housing units at an average density of 805.82 per square mile (311.1/km^{2}).

The top five reported languages (people were allowed to report up to two languages, thus the figures will generally add to more than 100%) were English (90.4%), Spanish (1.8%), Indo-European (2.4%), Asian and Pacific Islander (3.4%), and Other (2.0%).

The median age in the city was 44.3 years.

Germantown, Tennessee – racial and ethnic composition Note: the US Census treats Hispanic/Latino as an ethnic category. This table excludes Latinos from the racial categories and assigns them to a separate category. Hispanics/Latinos may be of any race.
| Race / ethnicity (NH = non-Hispanic) | Pop. 1990 | Pop. 2000 | Pop. 2010 | Pop. 2020 | % 1990 | % 2000 | % 2010 | % 2020 |
|---|---|---|---|---|---|---|---|---|
| White alone (NH) | 31,057 | 34,389 | 34,233 | 34,033 | 94.42% | 92.08% | 88.13% | 82.34% |
| Black or African American alone (NH) | 604 | 867 | 1,381 | 1,671 | 1.84% | 2.32% | 3.56% | 4.04% |
| Native American or Alaska Native alone (NH) | 63 | 52 | 71 | 64 | 0.19% | 0.14% | 0.18% | 0.15% |
| Asian alone (NH) | 887 | 1,302 | 1,994 | 2,855 | 2.70% | 3.49% | 5.13% | 6.91% |
| Pacific Islander alone (NH) | — | 13 | 7 | 5 | — | 0.03% | 0.02% | 0.01% |
| Other race alone (NH) | 4 | 16 | 45 | 126 | 0.01% | 0.04% | 0.12% | 0.30% |
| Mixed race or multiracial (NH) | — | 302 | 380 | 1,337 | — | 0.81% | 0.98% | 3.23% |
| Hispanic or Latino (any race) | 278 | 407 | 733 | 1,242 | 0.85% | 1.09% | 1.89% | 3.00% |
| Total | 32,893 | 37,348 | 38,844 | 41,333 | 100.00% | 100.00% | 100.00% | 100.00% |

=== 2020 census ===
As of the 2020 census, there were 41,333 people, 15,568 households, and 12,080 families residing in the city. The population density was 2,068.10 inhabitants per square mile (798.5/km^{2}). There were 16,300 housing units at an average density of 815.57 per square mile (314.9/km^{2}). The racial makeup of the city was 82.96% White, 4.11% African American, 0.20% Native American, 6.93% Asian, 0.02% Pacific Islander, 0.83% from some other races and 4.96% from two or more races. Hispanic or Latino people of any race were 3.00% of the population.

There were 15,568 households, out of which 34.2% had children under the age of 18 living in them, 67.6% were married-couple living together, 20.6% had a female householder and no husband present, 9.9% had a male householder and no wife present, and _% were non-families. 20.3% of all households were made up of individuals, and 11.8% had someone living alone who was 65 years of age or older. The average household size was 2.60 and the average family size was 3.00.

Of the residents, 24.1% of residents were under the age of 18 and 22.3% were 65 years of age or older. For every 100 females there were 93.8 males, and for every 100 females age 18 and over there were 89.0 males age 18 and over. The homeowner vacancy rate was 1.2% and the rental vacancy rate was 13.1%.

=== 2010 census ===
As of the 2010 census, there were 38,844 people, 14,910 households, and 11,650 families residing in the city. The population density was 1,945.02 inhabitants per square mile (751.0/km^{2}). There were 15,536 housing units at an average density of 777.93 per square mile (300.4/km^{2}). The racial makeup of the city was 89.55% White, 3.57% African American, 0.21% Native American, 5.15% Asian, 0.02% Pacific Islander, 0.43% from some other races and 1.07% from two or more races. Hispanic or Latino people of any race were 1.89% of the population.

There were 14,910 households, out of which 32.2% had children under the age of 18 living with them, 69.5% were married couples living together, 6.4% had a female householder with no husband present, 2.2% had a male householder with no wife present, and 21.9% were non-families. 19.7% of all households were made up of individuals, and 9.0% had someone living alone who was 65 years of age or older. The average household size was 2.60 and the average family size was 3.00.

In the city, the population was spread out, with 26.2% under the age of 20, 3.5% from 20 to 24, 19.2% from 25 to 44, 35.1% from 45 to 64, and 16.0% who were 65 years of age or older. The median age was 45.7 years. There were 18,800 males, of whom 14,023 were over the age of 18. There were 20,044 females, of whom 15,447 were over the age of 18.

The median income for a household in the city was $112,979, and the median income for a family was $127,216. Males had a median income of $93,401 versus $54,592 for females. The per capita income for the city was $54,157. About 1.9% of families and 2.9% of the population were below the poverty line, including 2.8% of those under age 18 and 2.2% of those age 65 or over.

=== 2000 census ===
As of the 2000 census, there were 37,348 people, 13,220 households, and 11,065 families residing in the city. The population density was 2,124.10 inhabitants per square mile (820.1/km^{2}). There were 13,676 housing units at an average density of 777.80 per square mile (300.3/km^{2}). The racial makeup of the city was 92.94% White, 2.33% African American, 0.16% Native American, 3.50% Asian, 0.03% Pacific Islander, 0.17% from some other races and 0.87% from two or more races. Hispanic or Latino people of any race were 1.09% of the population.

There were 13,220 households, out of which 41.2% have children under the age of 18 living with them, 75.7% were married couples living together, 6.1% have a female householder with no husband present, and 16.3% were non-families. 14.6% of all households were made up of individuals and 4.7% have someone living alone who was 65 years of age or older. The average household size was 2.82 and the average family size was 3.14.

In the city the population was spread out, with 28.0% under the age of 18, 5.8% from 18 to 24, 23.5% from 25 to 44, 33.5% from 45 to 64, and 9.2% who were 65 years of age or older. The median age was 41 years. For every 100 females there were 95.0 males. For every 100 females age 18 and over, there were 92.2 males.

The median income for a household in the city was $94,609, and the median income for a family was $103,726. Males have a median income of $77,857 versus $38,311 for females. The per capita income for the city was $44,021. 2.1% of the population and 1.6% of families were below the poverty line. Out of the total people living in poverty, 2.0% were under the age of 18 and 1.3% were 65 or older.

== Amenities ==
A total of 27 parks allow for a park within walking distance of every residence. The community has more than 748 acres (303 ha) of parkland. More than 11.4 miles (18.3 km) of greenway links parkland and neighborhoods.

The Community Library was constructed in 1996 and the Regional History and Genealogy Center opened in FY07.

The Germantown Performing Arts Centre (GPAC) is an 800-seat theater that has hosted artists from around the world.

The Germantown Athletic Club is a 118,000-square-foot (11,000 m^{2}) indoor athletic complex that opened in 1989 and expanded in 2003 to include two outdoor pools.

The Great Hall & Conference Center is an 8,000 square feet (740 m^{2}) rental facility space for accommodation of meetings, weddings and receptions.

== Churches ==
- Covenant Presbyterian Church (PCUSA, formerly Cumberland Presbyterian Church of Germantown)
- Faith Presbyterian Church (EPC)
- Farmington Presbyterian Church (PCUSA)
- Forest Hill Baptist Church
- Forest Hill Church of Christ
- Germantown Baptist Church
- Germantown Church of Christ
- Germantown Presbyterian Church (PCUSA)
- Germantown United Methodist Church
- Grace Evangelical Church
- New Bethel Missionary Baptist Church
- Our Lady of Perpetual Help Catholic Church
- Riveroaks Reformed Presbyterian Church (PCA)
- St. George's Episcopal Church

== Notable people ==
Notable celebrities who currently reside or have previously resided in Germantown include:

- Julien Baker, indie rock singer
- Kennedy Baker, Artistic gymnast, was born in Germantown.
- Chris Bell, co-founder of the band Big Star, was from a prominent Germantown family
- Bobby Bland, singer-songwriter, band leader
- Matt Cain, pitcher for the San Francisco Giants
- Mickey Callaway, professional baseball player and coach
- Cindy Parlow Cone, US Women's National Soccer Team member and two-time Olympic gold medal winner (1996 and 2004)
- John Daly, professional golfer
- Kallen Esperian, soprano, Metropolitan Opera
- Marc Gasol, NBA player with the local Memphis Grizzlies, moved to Germantown as a teenager with his parents after older brother Pau was drafted by the Grizzlies. Their parents still live in Germantown.
- David Gossett, professional golfer
- Hamed Haddadi, NBA player
- Austin Hollins, professional basketball player and son of Lionel Hollins
- Lionel Hollins, professional basketball player, former Memphis Grizzlies head coach
- Olivia Holt, actress
- Tim Howard, US National Soccer Team goalkeeper
- Phil Irwin, former Major League Baseball pitcher
- David Kustoff, U.S. representative and former U.S. attorney for the Western District of Tennessee
- Paul Maholm, Atlanta Braves pitcher
- Bob Melvin, manager of the San Francisco Giants
- Don Nix, musician, songwriter and musical producer
- Chris Parnell, former member of the cast of Saturday Night Live
- Elliot Perry, professional basketball player
- Missi Pyle, Screen Actors Guild Awards nominated actress
- Loren Roberts, professional golfer
- Melanie Smith, U.S. Equestrian Team member, gold medal winner, 1984 Olympics
- Ben Spies, former World Super Bike champion and Moto GP racer
- Todd Starnes, conservative columnist, commentator, author and radio host.
- Michael Stern, conductor
- Kevin Swindell, NASCAR driver
- Sammy Swindell, Hall of Fame sprint car driver
- Joe Theismann, former NFL quarterback
- Tony Williams, former NFL defensive tackle

== City partnerships ==
- (Germany) Königs Wusterhausen
