= Mark Gwyn =

American law enforcement officer (1962/1963–2024)

- Born: May 26, 1963; McMinnville, Tennessee, U.S.
- Died: August 22, 2024 (aged 61); Tennessee, U.S.
- Education: Middle Tennessee State University; Tennessee State University
- Occupation: Law enforcement officer
- Known for: Director of the Tennessee Bureau of Investigation (2004–2018)

Mark Randall Gwyn (May 26, 1963 – August 22, 2024) was an American law enforcement officer. He was the director of the Tennessee Bureau of Investigation (TBI). He was the eighth director in the agency's history and the first African American to serve in this capacity, serving in this position for fifteen years from 2004 to 2018.

== Early life ==
Mark Gwyn was born in McMinnville, Tennessee. He graduated from Middle Tennessee State University, where he earned a bachelor's degree, and Tennessee State University, where he earned a master's degree.

== Career ==
Gwyn began his career as a patrolman with the McMinnville police department in 1985. Three years later he joined the TBI as a Special Agent. Gwyn spent eight years investigating some of the state's most high-profile crimes before being promoted to Executive Officer in 1996. In 2001, Gwyn became assistant director of TBI in charge of the Forensic Services Division, in which position he supervised the state's three crime labs; he became its director in 2004. In August 2004, after his appointment as TBI Director, Gwyn became an active member of the Governor's Meth Task Force, which helped craft legislation to combat the illegal production and use of methamphetamine. The state's Fusion Center was constructed within TBI Headquarters under his watch housing Homeland Security among other programs such as Amber alert and Tennessee's Sex Offender Registry. In 2006, Gwyn's opposition helped prevent the enactment of proposed legislation that would have legalized the production of gambling devices in Tennessee.

Gwyn attended the 33rd session of the FBI's National Executive Institute, the John F. Kennedy School of Government from Harvard University, the FBI's Leadership in Counterterrorism program, the Tennessee Law Enforcement Training Academy, the TBI Criminal Investigation Academy, and the FBI National Academy, and received terrorism training in Israel from the Israeli National Police.

Gwyn served on the Narcotics and Dangerous Drugs Committee of the International Association of Chiefs of Police, the board of the University of Tennessee National Forensic Academy, and local boards of directors for the Salvation Army and Second Harvest Food Bank. In 2006, Middle Tennessee State University recognized Gwyn as the Distinguished African-American Alumni of the year and in 2010 he was the recipient of the Distinguished Alumni Award for professional achievement.

In 2018, Gwyn retired less than 2 years into his third term.

== Death ==
On August 22, 2024, TBI officials revealed that Gwyn died at his Nashville-area home at the age of 61. He died from what appeared to be natural causes.

== Sources ==
- TBI Director, Mark Gwyn, TBI website
- TBI Director, Mark Gwyn (2008), TBI website
