= Pigeon Forge Police Department =

Tennessee police department

Coordinates: 35.7900°N 83.5625°W

Agency overview
- Formed: 1961

Jurisdictional structure
- Legal jurisdiction: City of Pigeon Forge

Operational structure
- Sworn members: 56
- Unsworn members: 14
- Agency executive: Richard Catlett, Chief of Police

Facilities
- Stations: 1

Website
- Official website

The Pigeon Forge Police Department, sometimes referred to as "PFPD", is the primary law enforcement organization serving Pigeon Forge, Tennessee in the United States.

According to its website, "applying technology to law enforcement has been a primary goal of the Pigeon Forge Police Department, second only to the application of the community policing philosophy." In addition to the department's publicized application of technology, the police department has specialized units and organization, which is notable considering the city of Pigeon Forge only has approximately 5,000 residents. The department is notable among police departments in Tennessee for having a Tactical Response Unit, a type of SWAT rescue team that is typically found in police departments of larger cities. The police run Citizen Police Academy is noteworthy.

Jack H. Baldwin, a former chief of police announced his retirement effective February 2, 2018 after 42 years in office. He was replaced by Richard Catlett.

== Growth of Pigeon Forge ==
Colonel Samuel Wear, a Revolutionary War veteran who fought at the Battle of Kings Mountain, helped establish a military post at Walden's Creek around 1781, which is a historical site in Pigeon Forge. By 1907, the unincorporated village only had a population of 154. The village was not incorporated into a town until 1961. Compared to 30 years ago when there were only two stoplights on Highway 441, the Parkway which is the main city street, has six lanes of traffic and many stoplights. The growth of the city coincides with the establishment of the Dollywood theme park, named after singer Dolly Parton in 1981. It and other attractions in the city draw 11 million tourists a year. That has resulted in the Pigeon Forge Police Department having a large force compared to the resident population as well as the establishment of several specialized departments within the police department.

== Personnel ==
The Pigeon Forge Police Department has 93 employees. a chief, two captains, two training officer, four school resource officers, two fleet supervisors and a communications supervisor, four lieutenants, five sergeants, six corporals, 13 communications officers, four records clerks and six detectives. The patrol division is assigned 38 officers. The traffic division has eight officers and the K9 division has three officers. Four officers are lieutenants, three are sergeants and six are corporals.

=== Rank structure ===
Title	Insignia
Chief of police	
Captain	
Lieutenant	
Sergeant	
Corporal	
Police Officer/Detective	

== Specialized units ==
=== Tactical Rescue Unit (TRU) ===
The police department is unusual in that a force of this size has a special SWAT team called the Tactical Rescue Unit (TRU TEAM). The unit's formal purpose is to be "deployed in those situations or events which by their nature are more dangerous or hazardous to officers than the majority of calls for police action, and which may constitute or contribute to grave peril to the public." At least two years of department service and completion the basic training test is required for induction into the unit. Their job is potentially dangerous given the situations which SWAT teams of other cities have encountered. They are trained in the arts of hostage rescuing, situations involving barricaded gunmen, sniper fire, etc.

=== Criminal Investigations Division ===
The unit consists of five investigators. It consists of a supervisor, three investigators, a juvenile officer, and a crime scene technician. Officers are sometimes assigned to the Drug Task Force and Street Crimes Task Force. One position in CID is a rotating position, allowing patrol officers a chance at four months of coming off the road and working alongside the detectives.

=== Other units ===
- A motorcycle patrol unit consisting of six officers
- The bicycle unit consisting of three officers
- Operations Support Division which includes the communications center in addition to records clerks and court clerks
- The Crisis Negotiations Unit (CNU) consists of two teams with five personnel on each. They are trained to respond to any crisis or hostage situation. The CNU has high tech equipment to communicate with subjects in barricaded situations and they work alongside the Tactical Response Unit.

== Crime data ==
From 2001-2004, there were no murders and between four and six robberies per year in the city. There were 78 to 198 burglaries during each of those years during that period.

== Recent history ==
In 2006, the Pigeon Forge Police department was involved in a case where an amusement park manager was accused of murder. The trial was reported by U.S. cable TV station, CourtTV. The accused man was instead eventually convicted of reckless homicide.

== Citizen Police Academy ==
The police department operates a citizen police academy. It was established in 1998 and holds weekly Tuesday evening classes for four months each year. The program seeks to educate the public about police duties. The curriculum includes having pupils ride with police officers on patrols. However, completion of the course does not grant certification to become a police officer; it is solely an opportunity for members of the local community to have hands-on experience with the police department. The citizens police academy has limited space; each session has 25 or less students. Each session includes classroom time along with actual hands-on simulated training in the field. The yearly citizens police academy usually begins at the end of January or beginning of February of each year and is open to anyone who can attend every Tuesday evening for a four-month period.

== Museum ==
The police department had retired police equipment on display among the 5,000 displayed items at the Carbo's Police Museum in Pigeon Force. The museum was privately owned and not operated by the department. Carbos closed as of the fall of 2009 after nearly 35 years of being in business.

== See also ==
- List of law enforcement agencies in Tennessee
