= Fentress County Sheriff's Office (Tennessee) =

- Common name: Fentress County Sheriff
- Abbreviation: FCSO

Jurisdictional structure
- Operations jurisdiction: Fentress County, Tennessee
- Area: 499 sq mi (1,290 km^{2})
- Population: 17,000
- General nature: Local civilian police

Operational structure
- Headquarters: Jamestown, Tennessee
- Sworn officers: 20 full-time 7 part-time
- Agency executive: Michael Reagon, Sheriff

The Fentress County Sheriff's Office (FCSO) is the primary law enforcement agency in Fentress County, Tennessee. The FCSO is responsible for patrolling the 499-square miles of the county and its 17,000+ residents. The FCSO currently employs 20 sworn full-time law enforcement officers, 7 part-time sworn officers and over 20 correctional officers. The headquarters is located in the county seat of Jamestown, Tennessee. The current Sheriff is Michael Reagon.

== Sheriff's sex scandal ==
On Tuesday April 11, 2017 around 9:30 a.m., the Tennessee Bureau of Investigation, the Federal Bureau of Investigation, and U.S. Department of Justice executed a search warrant on the Fentress County Sheriff's Department and Sheriff Charles "Chucky" Cravens. The FBI and TBI went into the sheriff's office and jail with around 20 agents and began seizing items from the Fentress County Sheriff's Office. Agents confiscated computer files, documents, and 2 sheriffs department vehicles. The Fentress County Sheriff's Office and Deputy Chief Ledbetter released a joint statement saying: We are disappointed and shocked by Cravens past actions and his admissions. Our focus remains on the day-to-day operation at the sheriff's office and the justice center. We echo 8th District Attorney General Jared Effler's sentiments in that 'we are committed to serve and protect the citizens of Fentress County.' The actions of Cravens do NOT reflect the brave men and women we have the privilege of working with on a daily basis." Fentress County Government and Fentress County Sheriff's Office have no further comment at this time, and with today's events we look forward to putting this matter behind us as we move forward to restore confidence with the professionalism and integrity that the people deserve.

"Today, another public official was sentenced to prison for violating their sworn oath to uphold the law," said Acting U.S. Attorney Jack Smith in a news release. "There are dire consequences when elected officials violate the public's trust and place their own interest above that of their constituents."

Cravens was in charge of operations at the Fentress County Jail in Jamestown, TN. An inmate claims she had unprotected sex with the sheriff in his office in July 2016. According to federal investigators, Cravens talked with two female inmates about having sex with them and leaving the jail together. Cravens reportedly drove the inmates to a trailer, which is where they had unprotected sex. Investigators say Cravens maintained relationships with these inmates until they were released in February 2017. Cravens was also accused of driving a third female inmate outside of the county to visit a relative. The inmate claims she had unprotected sex with Cravens during that trip. Federal officials say Cravens used his position to deliver "additional benefits" to the inmates he was involved in sexual relationships with, including being allowed outside to smoke and leaving the jail to visit relatives. Cravens is also accused of kicking a male inmate and putting him in a headlock while he was being handcuffed. The inmate claims Cravens hit him in the back of the head twice while he was handcuffed. The Tennessee Bureau of Investigation and the FBI both assisted in the investigation.

In Federal court Charles "Chucky" Cravens, 47, was charged with three counts of honest services fraud and one count of deprivation of rights under color of law. Cravens was sentenced to 33 months in the Petersburg Low Federal Correctional Facility where he is scheduled to be released on March 14, 2020 (Inmate Number: 25236-075).

The FBI does not talk when it is executing search warrants and collecting evidence, but it was pretty clear when it seized Fentress County Sheriff Chucky Cravens' truck and put it on a wrecker that he was the target. The FBI and TBI went into the sheriff's office and jail Tuesday morning. About 20 agents were seizing items from the Fentress County Sheriff's Office for hours. Agents came out with plenty of items, including paper records and computer files. Agents then brought them out to the mobile command center for processing. At the same time, other agents were spread all over the county conducting interviews and seizing evidence. What was the target of the investigation? Well, that's a secret, for now. Who was the target? That's not so secret. Inside the District Attorney's Office, agents were interviewing Sheriff Cravens. Just outside the office, the sheriff's confiscated vehicle was going to be carried back to Nashville for processing. Cravens is a lifetime Fentress County resident. He grew up in Clarkrange, graduated high school and moved quickly into law enforcement. Cravens was elected Fentress County sheriff in 2006 and lasted one term. Then he came back and ran successfully again in 2014. Cravens ran on a platform of an "officer in every school, open door policy," and treating all people with dignity. Right now, the FBI will only say it is investigating allegations of impropriety. Meanwhile, some residents say this is a long time coming. "This is a good day for a lot of people in this county," Jack Baker Sr. said. "I thought there would be a whole bunch of people cheering, but I am cheering in my heart because nothing I hate worse than someone who abuses their authority or neglects their authority." The FBI and TBI took files, took computers, but they did not take the sheriff. He is not under arrest, and that puts the county executive in a tough position. "Things may change by the hour, but at this point in time nothing has changed," County Executive J. Michael Cross said. "I am going to sit down with the county attorney and talk about our options. We want to be cautious. We want to be prudent, not overreact. We are concerned, deeply concerned, and will help with the investigation any way we can."
