= Tennessee Highway Patrol =

State Patrol organization for the U.S. state of Tennessee

- Patch of Tennessee Highway Patrol
- Abbreviation: THP

Agency overview
- Formed: December 14, 1929; 96 years ago
- Preceding agency: Tennessee State Police Force (1926–1929)
- Employees: 1,869 (as of 2004)

Jurisdictional structure
- Operations jurisdiction: Tennessee, USA
- Area: 42,169 square miles (109,220 km^{2})
- Population: 6,833,793 (2019 est.)
- General nature: Civilian police

Operational structure
- Headquarters: Nashville, Tennessee
- Sworn members: 1083 (authorized, as of 2024)
- Civilians: 897 (as of 2004)
- Agency executive: Matt Perry, Colonel (since 2020)
- Parent agency: Tennessee Department of Safety and Homeland Security
- Districts: 8

Facilities
- Actual patrol cars: Ford Explorer 2016/2023, Chevrolet Tahoe 2007/2016, Dodge Durango, Dodge Charger
- Aircraft: Bell 429 GlobalRanger

Website
- official page

The Tennessee Highway Patrol (THP) is the state patrol organization for the U.S. state of Tennessee, responsible for enforcing all federal and state laws relating to traffic on the state's federal and state highways. The THP is a division of the Tennessee Department of Safety and Homeland Security.

The Tennessee Highway Patrol provides assistance to motorists who need help. It investigates traffic accidents involving property damage, personal injury, or death. The agency works with prosecutors in the prosecution of cases in which the use of drugs or alcohol contributed to accidents causing personal injury or fatalities. In addition to traffic law enforcement, the Tennessee Highway Patrol has responsibility in criminal interdiction, which involves the suppression of narcotics on the state's roads and highways, including Interstate Highways. It is the agency responsible for conducting background checks on applicants for permits to carry handguns.

== History ==
The Tennessee Highway Patrol came into existence on December 14, 1929, to replace the unpopular Tennessee State Police Force, which had been created in 1926 and had been patterned after the Texas Rangers to obtain fees and taxes from citizens. In 1957, the Tennessee Highway Patrol became the first state police agency in the United States to utilize helicopters in patrol work.

== Administration ==
The head of the Tennessee Highway Patrol is Colonel Matt Perry, who has served with the organization since 2004 and has served as the head of Tennessee Highway Patrol since December 2020. The THP is headquartered in Nashville, the state capital. The agency's field operations are organized geographically into eight districts, each with a district headquarters and a varying number of troops (stations that are usually grouped with adjacent counties). As of September 2007, the Tennessee Highway Patrol was authorized to have up to 947 commissioned troopers.

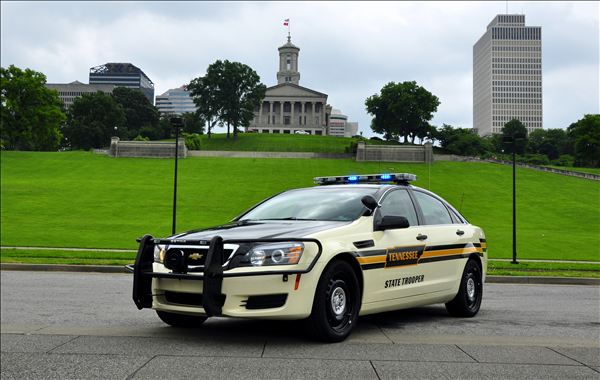

The Tennessee Highway Patrol operates six inspection sites around the state, in Districts 1, 2, 3, 4, 5, and 7. The Tennessee Highway Patrol's enforcement activities at the inspection sites, also called scale complexes, include inspections of commercial vehicles and driver logs, highway patrols with a focus on traffic violations by trucks, and weighing of commercial vehicles, both at permanent inspection stations on Interstate highways and with portable scales.

=== Organization ===
The Tennessee Highway Patrol is organized into eight districts, which have a district headquarters, a varying number of troops, and county facilities. The table below indicates the district, the troops in each region, the counties in each district and troop, and the locations of the district headquarters and inspection facilities (called scale complexes). With the extensive coverage of THP facilities, the Tennessee Highway Patrol therefore has a presence in each of Tennessee's 95 counties.

THP districts with their constituent troops and scale complexes
| District 1 (Knoxville) | District 2 (Chattanooga) | District 3 (Nashville) | District 4 (Memphis) | District 5 (Fall Branch) | District 6 (Cookeville) | District 7 (Lawrenceburg) | District 8 (Jackson) |
|---|---|---|---|---|---|---|---|
| District 1 covers 10 counties: Anderson, Blount, Campbell, Knox, Loudon, Monroe, Morgan, Roane, Scott, and Sevier. District 1 has 4 troops: Troops A, B, C, and D. | District 2 covers 12 counties: Bledsoe, Bradley, Coffee, Franklin, Grundy, Hamilton, Marion, McMinn, Meigs, Polk, Rhea, and Sequatchie. District 2 has 5 troops: Troops A, B, C, D, and E. | District 3 covers 12 counties: Cheatham, Davidson, Dickson, Houston, Humphreys, Montgomery, Robertson, Rutherford, Stewart, Sumner, Williamson, and Wilson. District 3 has 7 geographical troops: Troops A, B, C, D, E, F, and G | District 4 covers 7 counties: Crockett, Fayette, Hardeman, Haywood, Lauderdale, Shelby, and Tipton. District 4 has 4 troops: Troops A, B, C, and D. | District 5 covers 14 counties: Carter, Claiborne, Cocke, Grainger, Greene, Hamblen, Hancock, Hawkins, Jefferson, Johnson, Sullivan, Unicoi, Union, and Washington. District 5 has 5 troops: Troops A, B, C, D, and E. | District 6 covers 15 counties: Cannon, Clay, Cumberland, DeKalb, Fentress, Jackson, Macon, Overton, Pickett, Putnam, Smith, Trousdale, Van Buren, Warren, and White. District 6 has 5 troops: Troops A, B, C, D, and E. | District 7 covers 11 counties: Bedford, Giles, Hickman, Lawrence, Lewis, Lincoln, Marshall, Maury, Moore, Perry, and Wayne. District 7 has four troops: Troops A, B, C, and D. | District 8 covers 14 counties: Benton, Carroll, Chester, Decatur, Dyer, Gibson, Hardin, Henderson, Henry, Lake, Madison, McNairy, Obion, and Weakley District 8 has 5 troops: Troops A, B, C, D, and E. |
| Troop A covers the following county: Knox. | Troop A covers the following county: Hamilton. | Troop A covers the following counties: Cheatham, Dickson, and Humphreys. | Troop A covers the following counties: Shelby. | Troop A covers the following counties: Washington, Carter, Johnson, and Unicoi. | Troop A covers the following county: Putnam. | Troop A covers the following counties: Giles, Lawrence, and Lincoln. | Troop A covers the following county: Madison. |
| Troop B covers the following counties: Loudon, Morgan, and Roane. | Troop B covers the following counties: Bledsoe, Marion, and Sequatchie. | Troop B covers the following counties: Williamson. | Troop B covers the following counties: Fayette and Hardeman. | Troop B covers the following county: Sullivan. | Troop B covers the following counties: Fentress, Overton, and Pickett. | Troop B covers the following counties: Bedford, Marshall, and Moore. | Troop B covers the following counties: Gibson, Dyer, Lake, and Obion. |
| Troop C covers the following counties: Anderson, Campbell, and Scott. | Troop C covers the following counties: Bradley and Polk. | Troop C covers the following counties: Houston, Montgomery, and Stewart. | Troop C covers the following counties: Crockett, Lauderdale, and Tipton. | Troop C covers the following counties: Greene and Hawkins. | Troop C covers the following counties: Cumberland, Van Buren, and White. | Troop C covers the following counties: Hickman and Maury. | Troop C covers the following counties: Benton, Carroll, Henry, and Weakley. |
| Troop D covers the following counties: Blount, Monroe, and Sevier. | Troop D covers the following counties: Coffee, Franklin, and Grundy. | Troop D covers the following counties: Wilson and Sumner. | Troop D covers the following counties: Haywood. | Troop D covers the following counties: Claiborne, Grainger, Hancock, and Union. | Troop D covers the following counties: Cannon, DeKalb, Smith, and Warren. | Troop D covers the following counties: Lewis, Perry, and Wayne. | Troop D covers the following counties: Decatur and Henderson. |
| | Troop E covers the following counties: McMinn, Meigs, and Rhea. | Troop E covers the following county: Robertson. | | Troop E covers the following counties: Cocke, Hamblen, and Jefferson. | Troop E covers the following counties: Clay, Jackson, Macon, and Trousdale | | Troop E covers the following counties: Chester, Hardin, and McNairy. |
| | | Troop S comprises the following special programs: New Entrance, ACES, Pupil Transportation, D.A.R.E, and Motorcoach Inspection. | | | | | |
| The district headquarters are in Knoxville and the district's scale complex is located in Knox County. | The district headquarters are in Chattanooga and the district's scale complex is located in Coffee County. | The district headquarters are in Nashville and the district's scale complex is located in Robertson County. | The district headquarters are in Memphis and the district's scale complex is located in Haywood County. | The district headquarters are in Fall Branch and the district's scale complex is located in Greene County. | The district headquarters are in Cookeville. | The district headquarters are in Lawrenceburg and the district's scale complex is located in Giles County. | The district headquarters are in Jackson. |

=== Criminal Investigation Division ===
The Criminal Investigation Division of the Tennessee Highway Patrol investigates, gathers evidence, and assists federal, state, and local law enforcement, when requested. It also handles background checks for handgun carry permits.

- Handgun Carry Permits
- Identity Theft Information

=== Commercial Vehicle Enforcement Division ===
The Commercial Vehicle Enforcement Division of the Tennessee Highway Patrol inspects commercial vehicles and driver logs, weighs commercial vehicles, and patrols highways with a focus on truck traffic violations. Troop S in District 3 conducts all the below programs in addition to the D.A.R.E. program:

- District Offices
- New Entrant Program
- A.C.E.S.
- Pupil Transportation

=== Special Operations Unit ===
The Special Operations Unit of the Tennessee Highway Patrol consists of four specialized sections:

- Aviation section, which comprises four pilots, nine tactical flight officers, three mechanics, two Bell 407GX, and three Bell 429 helicopters
- Tactical/Scuba divers/Bomb Squad
- K-9 section
- the Governor's Task Force on Marijuana Eradication.
- Facility Protection Unit

== See also ==
- Highway patrol
- List of law enforcement agencies in Tennessee
- State police
