= Tennessee Bureau of Investigation =

State-wide investigative law enforcement agency

- Abbreviation: TBI
- Motto: "That guilt shall not escape, nor innocence suffer"

Agency overview
- Formed: March 27, 1980
- Preceding agency: Tennessee Bureau of Criminal Identification
- Employees: 550 (2017 est.)
- Annual budget: $147,156,800

Jurisdictional structure
- Operations jurisdiction: Tennessee, United States of America
- Area: 42,143 sq mi (109,150 km^{2})
- Population: 7,227,750 (2024 est.)

Operational structure
- Headquarters: Nashville, Tennessee

Website
- tn.gov/tbi

The Tennessee Bureau of Investigation (TBI) is the state bureau of investigation of the state of Tennessee. It has statutory authority to conduct criminal investigations and make arrests of crimes occurring throughout the state. The bureau is analogous to the FBI on the federal level.

== History ==
The Tennessee Bureau of Investigation was born as a result of a highly publicized murder in Greene County, Tennessee, in December 1949. The heinous crime aroused the emotion of citizens throughout the region. In an address to the Tennessee Press Association in January 1951, John M. Jones Sr., publisher of the Greeneville Sun, called for the creation of an unbiased state agency to assist local law enforcement in the investigation of serious crimes.

On March 14, 1951, Governor Gordon Browning signed a bill into law establishing the Tennessee Bureau of Criminal Identification as the plainclothes division of the Department of Safety. Following a series of legislative hearings by the Tennessee General Assembly, the organization was re-established on March 27, 1980, as an independent agency and renamed the Tennessee Bureau of Investigation.

From 2002 to April 2008 the Tennessee Bureau of Investigation worked with the FBI on Operation Tennessee Waltz, the undercover investigation portion of the operation started in 2004 and ended in 2005. This operation resulted in the arrest and convictions of a dozen state and local public officials, several of which were state senators. This operation resulted in new state ethics laws and the creation of an ethics commission in Tennessee.

In August 2024, the Tennessee Bureau of Investigation led an investigation which resulted in Clarksville, Tennessee police arresting six men, including an assistant football coach at Austin Peay State University, for human trafficking for sexual servitude charges.

== Overview ==
The bureau manages the state's three crime labs, assists local law enforcement in investigating major crimes, and conducts special investigations related to illegal drugs, fugitives, public corruption, official misconduct, organized crime, domestic terrorism, healthcare fraud, arson, explosives, and patient abuse.

The TBI has statutory responsibility for collecting state crime statistics, which are published in an annual report. It also manages a TBI most wanted list, amber alert program, and statewide registries of sex offenders and methamphetamine offenders. Besides its headquarters in Nashville, the TBI has offices in Chattanooga, Columbia, Cookeville, Jackson, Johnson City, Knoxville, and Memphis.

The bureau is headed by a director appointed by the Governor of Tennessee to a six-year term. The director is also a member of the Tennessee Law Enforcement Planning Commission. Its incumbent director is former Knoxville chief of police, David B. Rausch, appointed in 2018. As of 2017, the agency employs about 550 people, about half of whom are commissioned officers. The state of Tennessee approved a budget of $147,156,800 for the Tennessee Bureau of Investigation in the 2024-2025 fiscal year.

=== Divisions ===
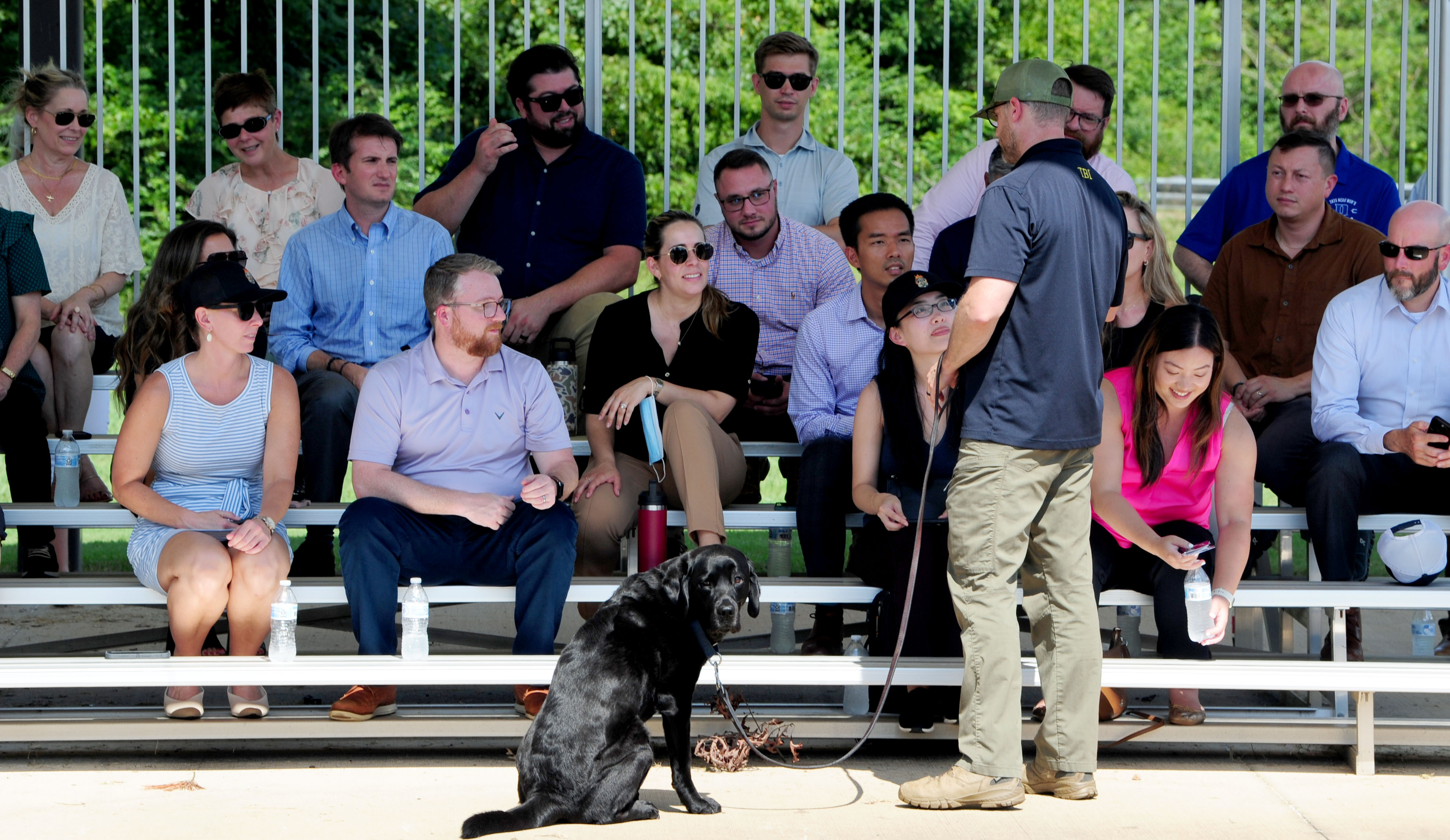
Jeff Moseley, a special agent and fire investigator with the Tennessee Bureau of Investigation, works with his canine, Honey, an accelerant detection canine, as students participate in an arson class at Redstone Arsenal.

The divisions of the Tennessee Bureau of Investigation are:

- Criminal Investigation
- Drug Investigation
- Forensic Services
- Criminal Justice Information Services
- Medicaid Fraud Control
- Technology & Innovation
- Administrative Services
- Training

== Controversy ==
Its incumbent director was appointed after previous director Mark Gwyn retired less than two years into his third term, amid controversies regarding nepotism in his hiring practices followed by a scathing audit by the comptroller's office which found he had overspent his budget for four years running.

The interim director, Jason Locke, also came under investigation the day David B. Rausch was appointed due to a complaint received from his wife describing misuse of state funds during an affair with another state employee at the Tennessee Department of Mental Health and Substance Abuse Services.

== See also ==
- List of law enforcement agencies in Tennessee
