= Trenton Police Department =

Police Department in Trenton, New Jersey

The Trenton Police Department (TPD) is a law enforcement agency serving Trenton, New Jersey. It consists of roughly 260 sworn officers in the city of around 90,000 people. In November 2024, the U.S. Department of Justice found the department had engaged in violating the Fourth Amendment.

== History ==
The department was created in 1792. A historical marker in the city was created to commemorate the date.

== Organization ==
The department is organized into five bureaus: Office of the Police Director, Internal Affairs Bureau, Criminal Investigation Bureau, Administrative Services Bureau, and Patrol Bureau.

== Department of Justice investigation ==
On October 17, 2023, the DOJ Civil Rights Division and the U.S. Attorney's Office for the District of New Jersey opened a pattern-or-practice investigation into the city and TPD.The investigation followed an incident in which an officer shot and paralyzed a young black man who attempted to drive away from a stop.

The page findings report, published November 21, 2024, concluded there was reasonable cause to believe the city and police department violated the Fourth Amendment. It cited excessive force such as unnecessary pepper spray, unlawful stops and searches and arrests. Alongside this, the report also identified weaknesses in training, supervision, and record-keeping.The DOJ stated that the city had paid around $7 million since 2021 to resolve lawsuits involving officer misconduct.26 recommendations were made to fix the department's problems, these recommendations revolved around supervision, training, accountability, and documentation.

After the investigation had opened, TPD disbanded two street enforcement units who had been found to have participated in constitutional violations. Many of the officers in the disbanded units were put into other units, which the DOJ states the effort did little to combat the behavior.

=== Response and reforms ===
Mayor Reed Gusciora stated that the City of Trenton would cooperate in the implementation of the recommendations made by the DOJ.The local NAACP chapter called for the Police Director Steve Wilson to resign, and to create a community-led review board, but none of these were established. In 2025, city officials announced a "City-Stat" initiative with more than 20 measures, additional officers, and higher salaries to compete with other departments.
