= Knoxville Police Department =

Municipal police in Tennessee, U.S.

- Abbreviation: KPD

Jurisdictional structure
- Operations jurisdiction: Knoxville, Tennessee, United States
- Legal jurisdiction: Knoxville, Tennessee
- General nature: Local civilian police

Operational structure
- Headquarters: 800 Howard Baker Jr. Ave
- Officers: 384
- Elected officer responsible: Indya Kincannon, Mayor of Knoxville, Tennessee
- Agency executive: Paul Noel, Chief of Police
- Divisions: 4: Criminal Investigations; Management; Patrol; Support Services

Facilities
- Districts: 3: West District; East District

Website
- www.knoxvilletn.gov/government/city_departments_offices/police_department

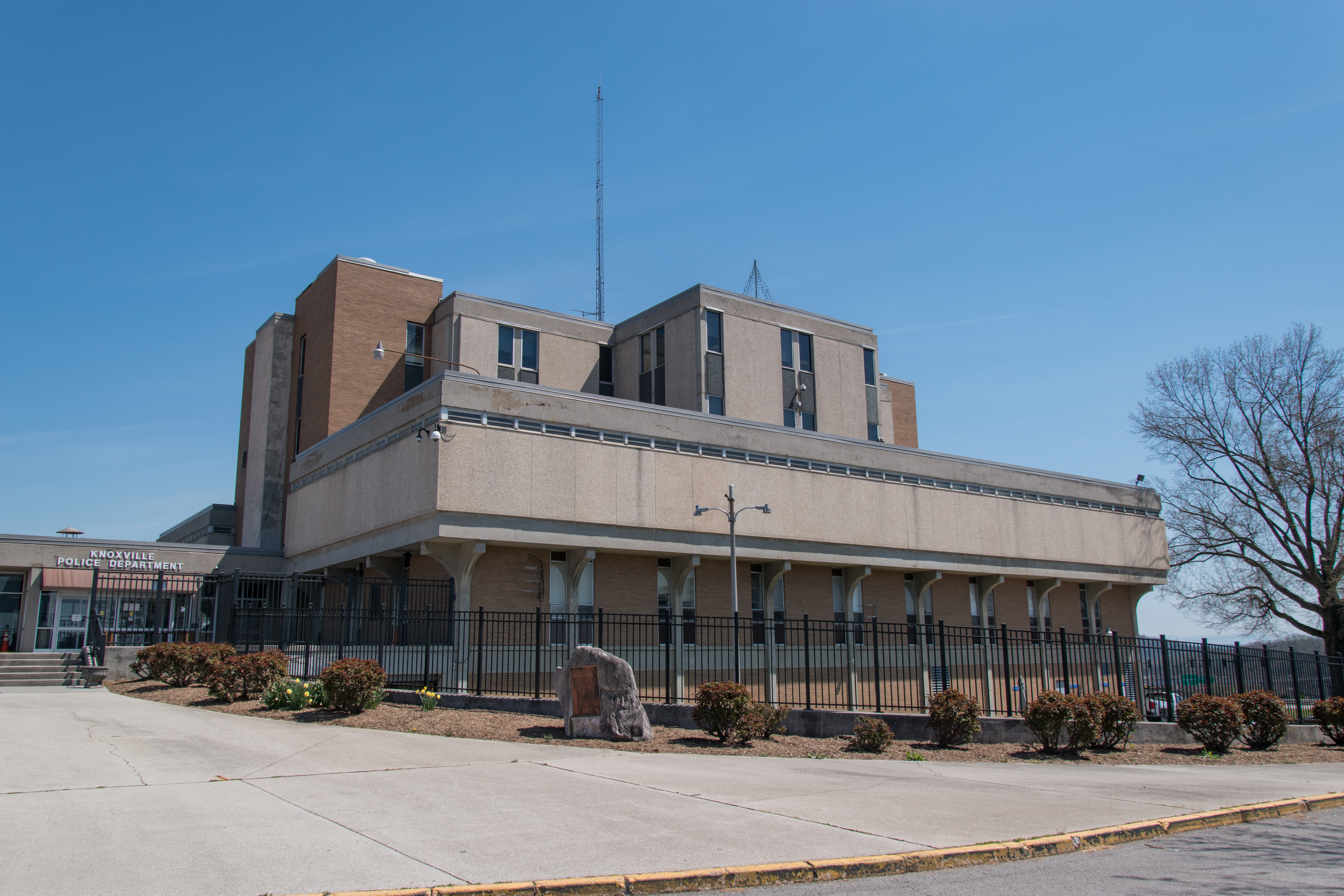
Headquarters

The Knoxville Police Department is the law enforcement agency of the City of Knoxville, Tennessee, United States.

== History ==
Knoxville was settled in the late 18th century, but law enforcement and criminal justice were handled by Knox County in its earliest years. By the early 1800s, Knoxville began to establish its own municipal government services, and Joseph R. Reed was named Town Sergeant in 1802. He was paid $80 per year, and his responsibilities included patrolling the town two nights per week and enforcing the observance of the Sabbath. For the next half a century, policing in Knoxville was informal and often the responsibility of one paid employee and some unpaid night watchmen.

In 1857, M. V. Bridwell was named the first chief of police, and paid watchmen (discreetly appointed men referred to as "secret police") were first utilized in 1867. In 1885, a three-man board of public works was created in Knoxville to give more structured oversight to police officers and other city employees.

Among the notable officers of the department's early history was Calvin M. Mason, a formerly enslaved man who joined KPD and served until his retirement in 1902. Mason used his savings to become the city's first African American property owner and taxpayer in 1866, and in 1879 established a school for deaf children in his home. In 1881, the state legislature passed a bill establishing a school for African American deaf children, with Mason's home as its first location. In October 1955, the department hired its first African American female officer, Mrs. William Henderson.

In 1901, Knoxville officers accosted Harvey Logan (also known as Kid Curry), an outlaw and a member of Butch Cassidy's Wild Bunch who had been suspected in the deaths of several other law enforcement officials. Officers William Dinwiddie and Robert Saylor were wounded in the ensuing shootout. Logan was arrested for the shootings, but he escaped from jail; he fatally shot himself in 1904 while being pursued by a posse. Dinwiddie and Saylor both died in 1914, and both of their deaths were attributed to complications of the 1901 shooting.

== Organization ==
As of 2023, the Chief of Police is Paul Noel. The department has three bureaus, the Field Operations Bureau contains the majority of the uniformed members, the Investigation Bureau Division is responsible for all criminal and felony investigations within the department and the Management Services Division oversees human resources, financial, and legal aspects of the department. The Support Services Division oversees all programs and educational and training aspects of the department, as well as volunteer programs.

== Controversies ==
The Knoxville Police Department has been accused of using excessive force on multiple occasions.

On February 5, 2023, 60 year old Lisa Edwards was arrested at Fort Sanders Regional Medical Center after hospital staff reported her to police for not leaving the hospital premises after being discharged. When officers arrived Edwards told them that she could not breathe or walk. The officers did not attempt to verify her claims, but yelled at her and told her she was fine. She was placed in the back of a police cruiser and lost consciousness on the way to jail. Edwards was returned to the hospital where she died the next day. As a result of their conduct during the incident, one officer was demoted and two were temporarily suspended without pay.

On November 26, 2018, Sierra McCauley, 23 years old, was killed by KPD Officer James Gadd on November 26. McCauley was naked and holding a knife when Officer Gadd arrived on scene. He gave 10 verbal commands in 22 seconds before fatally shooting her. The shooting was ruled justified. Officer Gadd is a 23-year KPD veteran. McCauley's death was cited by Knox County Democratic Party Progressive Action Committee as evidence of "racial bias, excessive use of force, and/or insufficient mental health crisis intervention training of the officers involved."

On August 26, 2019, Channara Tom "Philly" Pheap was suspected of a hit and run. According to eyewitnesses, he was shot twice in the back by KPD Officer Dylan M. Williams. There is no camera footage of the shooting, though dash camera footage of some of the lead up is available. Pheap's death was also cited in the Knox County Democratic Party Progressive Action Committee report. A Federal wrongful death lawsuit has been filed by Pheap's family seeking $5M in damages.

In July 2014 Ron Carden was shot in the back by Knoxville Police Department Officer David Gerlach. The shooting happened just off to the side of the view of the cruiser mounted camera. According to local Knoxville USA Today affiliate KnoxNews "Chief U.S. District Judge Tom Varlan ruled Tuesday attorney Richard M. Brooks failed – after nearly three years of litigation and a day’s worth of trial testimony in U.S. District Court – to present enough evidence to allow the jury to even consider whether Knoxville Police Department Officer David Gerlach had the legal right to use deadly force against parolee Ronald E. Carden."

== See also ==
- List of law enforcement agencies in Tennessee
