= Tennessee Department of Safety and Homeland Security =

Government agency in Tennessee, United States

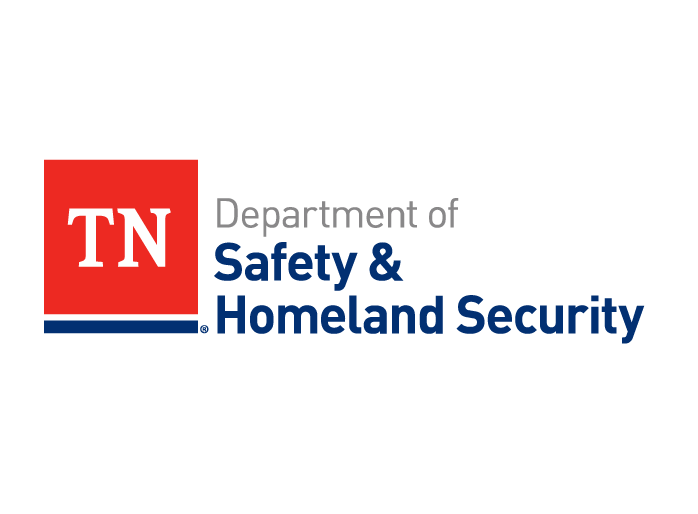
- Common name: Tennessee Department of Safety
- Abbreviation: TDOS

Agency overview
- Formed: 1939

Jurisdictional structure
- Operations jurisdiction: Tennessee, USA
- Map of Tennessee Department of Safety and Homeland Security's jurisdiction
- Area: 42,143 sq. miles
- Population: 7,051,105 (2022 estimate)
- General nature: Civilian police

Operational structure
- Headquarters: 1150 Foster Avenue; Nashville, Tennessee
- Agency executives: Jeff Long, Commissioner; Les Dolente, Deputy Commissioner
- Child agencies: Tennessee Highway Patrol; Tennessee Driver License Services; Tennessee Office of Homeland Security

Facilities
- Helicopters: 5 Bell 206B Jet Rangers and 1 Huey UH-1H

Website
- http://www.tn.gov/safety/

The Tennessee Department of Safety and Homeland Security (TDOS), also known as the Tennessee Department of Safety or DOS, is a law enforcement agency serving the U.S. state of Tennessee. The TDOS is made up of three main divisions: the Tennessee Highway Patrol (THP), the Tennessee Driver License Services division, and the Tennessee Office of Homeland Security.

== History ==
The TDOS was established in 1939 by the Tennessee General Assembly to exercise authority over the THP. Over the decades, the agency has evolved to meet new challenges, such as drug trafficking, the issuance of drivers' licenses, and terrorism. Therefore, the TDOS currently comprises three divisions: the THP, the Driver License Services division, and the state Office of Homeland Security (OHS).

The current commissioner of the Department of Safety and Homeland Security is Jeff Long, who has been serving since January 2019 after being appointed by Governor Bill Lee. He is assisted by deputy and assistant commissioners, including the director of the Tennessee Highway Patrol, Col. Matt Perry.

== Functions ==
The TDOS manages the THP, OHS, and the Driver License Services division. The THP is the highway patrol agency for Tennessee, which has jurisdiction anywhere in the state. The Office of Homeland Security was created in April 2003 by an executive order by then-Governor Phil Bredesen in the aftermath of September 11, 2001. The Driver License Services division issues various kinds of identification cards, including hardship licenses for minors, graduated driver licenses, regular driver licenses, commercial driver licenses, and state identification cards. In addition to the above functions, the TDOS has issued handgun permits through the THP since October 1996, assuming the role previously taken by local sheriffs' offices.

== Commissioners ==
#	Image	Name	Took office	Left office	Governor
Commissioner of the Tennessee Department of Safety and Homeland Security
1		David Mitchell	January 2007	January 2010	Phil Bredesen
2		Bill Gibbons	January 2010	September 2016	
2		Bill Gibbons	January 2010	September 2016	Bill Haslam
3		David Purkey	September 2016	January 19, 2019	Bill Haslam
4		Jeff Long	January 20, 2019	Incumbent	Bill Lee
