= Nashville shooting =

Nashville shooting may refer to:

- Shooting of Jocques Clemmons (2017)
- Burnette Chapel shooting (2017)
- Nashville Waffle House shooting (2018)
- 2023 Nashville school shooting
- Antioch High School shooting (2025)

== See also ==
- 2020 Nashville bombing
- Nashville school shooting
- List of mass shootings in the United States
