= I Believe in Nashville =

Murals by Adrien Saporiti in Nashville, Tennessee

I Believe in Nashville (also, I Believe in Nashville Mural ) is a series of painted murals started in 2012 by the artist Adrien Saporiti, a Nashville native. The mural, which started in one location, has since been replicated on several walls throughout the city of Nashville. It has become a popular tourist destination and scene to pose for Instagram photos, having appeared on the photo-sharing platform over one million times.

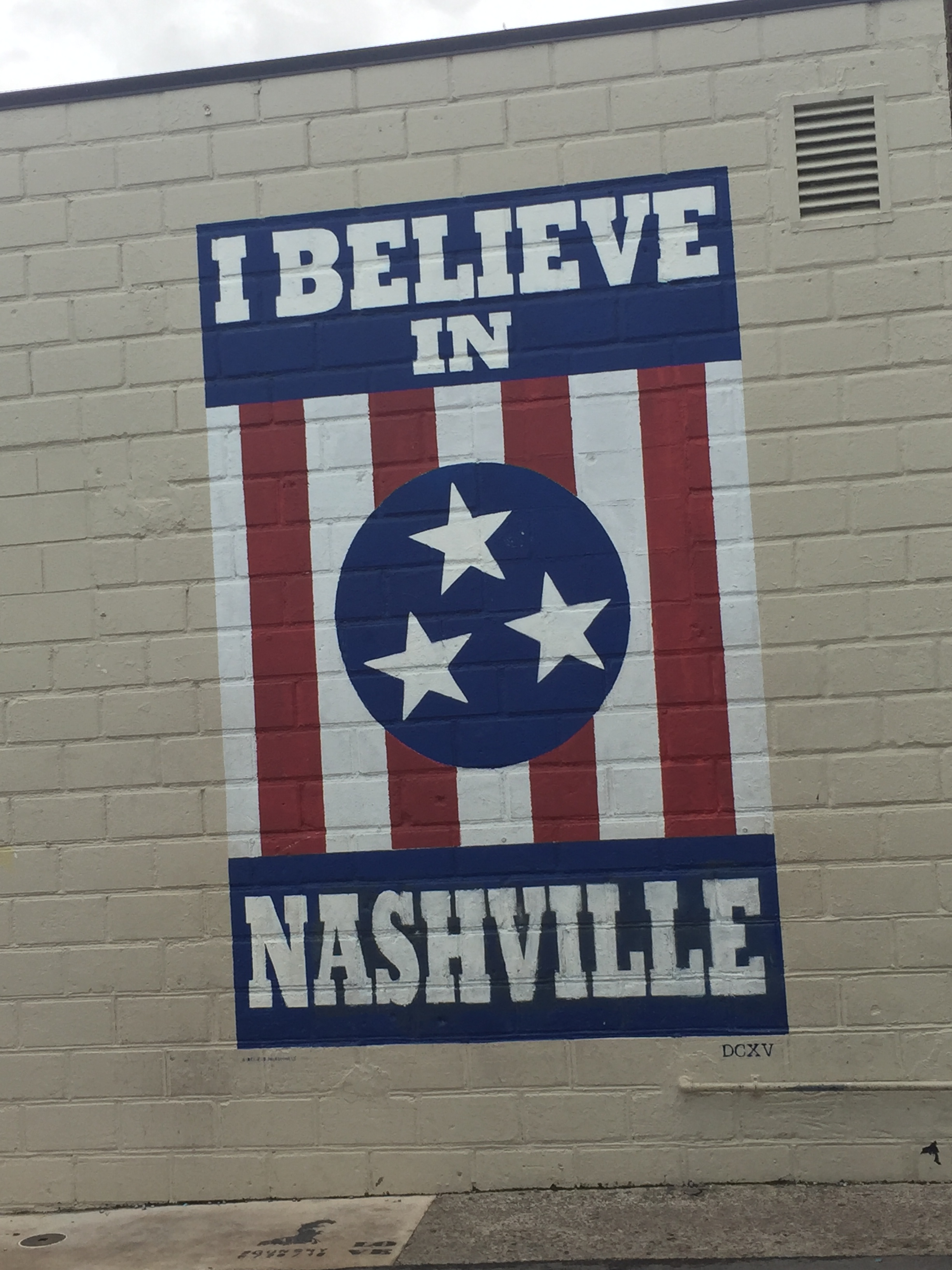
Photograph of the I Believe in Nashville Mural created by Adrien Saporiti in Nashville, Tennessee.

== History and creation ==
The first instance of the mural went up in the 12 South neighborhood of Nashville in March 2012. The piece is simple and described as "minimal... (with) three bold colors and four simple words." Part of the artwork's meaning is conveyed through its simplicity, which makes the message of Nashville pride very apparent while also drawing on the colors and tristar of the Tennessee State Flag. Prior to the creation of the mural, Nashville suffered historic flooding during the 2010 Tennessee floods. The mural has been described as a monument to the city's resilience in the aftermath of flood damage and its transformation into one of the "It Cities" of the United States.

=== Vandalism ===
Because of the mural's popularity, it has become a high-profile target for vandalism. The mural is known to have been vandalized at least three times. The first vandalization involved black tar being dumped on top of the mural in March 2017, shortly before the mural's fifth year anniversary. The second vandalization occurred just over four months later in July 2017. This time, a globe was painted over the center tristar, while the words "Global Warming" were painted over the word "Nashville," resulting in the mural saying "I Believe in Global Warming," in an apparent desire to draw attention to climate change. Three people were later charged for the defacement. The third instance of vandalism occurred in August 2018, where the word "Nashville" was changed to "rack," likely in reference to either the slang term of money or women's breasts since the vandalism was performed by a teenage boy.

=== Locations ===
Murals have a tradition of using their location and presence to send messages, often political, to passersby. While Saporiti claims he was not trying to send any sort of political message other "than to maybe bring people together," the mural locations are deliberately placed on brick buildings reminiscent of "old" Nashville in parts of the city that are undergoing rapid growth and transformation, such as 12 South or East Nashville. Three official versions of the mural have been created. The original is located on the Howell's Alley building at 2700 12th Ave. S., Nashville, TN 37204. Later versions, created by Saporiti's DCXV Industries, include a wider version at Marathon Music Works (1402 Clinton St., Nashville, TN 37203) and a smaller version at the music venue Basement East in East Nashville at 917 Woodland St., Nashville, TN 37206. The latter mural survived the Basement East's substantial destruction in the Tornado outbreak of March 2–3, 2020.

== Cultural influence ==
Because of the nature of murals as an art form being painted on buildings and walls, murals often can transcend their mediums and represent shared social beliefs. The mural has quickly become one of the most iconic symbols of Nashville. Its pop-culture references include the newspaper the Wall Street Journal, the magazine GQ, a music video from artist Hayden Panettiere, a Pepsi commercial, and the TV show American Pickers. Additionally, famous celebrities such as Brett Eldredge and Miranda Lambert have worn merchandise depicting the mural, which has spawned its own website and brand.

The I Believe in Nashville mural is part of a greater trend of increasingly visible street art appearing in Nashville, which is often sponsored by businesses who see the murals as a way of branding their company or creating buzz around their space. The Mural has become one of Nashville's standout murals in a city where street art has become part of the culture.

=== Reproductions and Philanthropic contributions ===
The original version is sold on different hats, mugs, shirts, and other memorabilia by the I Believe in Nashville company. Because of its simplicity, the design of the mural lends itself not only to reproduction but to be changed and copied to fit different promotional causes. These changes typically occur through changing the color scheme, the symbol in the middle of the design, and the word along the bottom.

An interpretation of the mural can be found on Bridgestone Arena building, home of the Nashville Predators hockey team called "I Believe in Smashville," which combines the overall layout of the original with the color scheme of the Nashville Predators.

In 2020 a devastating tornado tore through Middle Tennessee. Affecting Nashville's 12 South area, the tornado caused severe damage to the murals The Basement East location, while the mural itself was left standing. Through the sale of "I Believe in Nashville" t-shirt proceeds, Richard Egan( Owner of IBIN brand) and Tim Gerst, were able to raise and donate over $1 millions dollars in disaster relief funds.

Artist Brantley Gilbert collaborated with the I Believe in Nashville team, to promote the sales of "I Believe in Heroism" t-shirts, meant to benefit James Shaw Jr., hero of the Nashville Waffle House shooting.

An "I Believe in California" version was created and sold on t-shirts to benefit victims of the 2018 California wildfires.
