= Second Avenue Commercial District =

Historic district in Nashville

- U.S. National Register of Historic Places
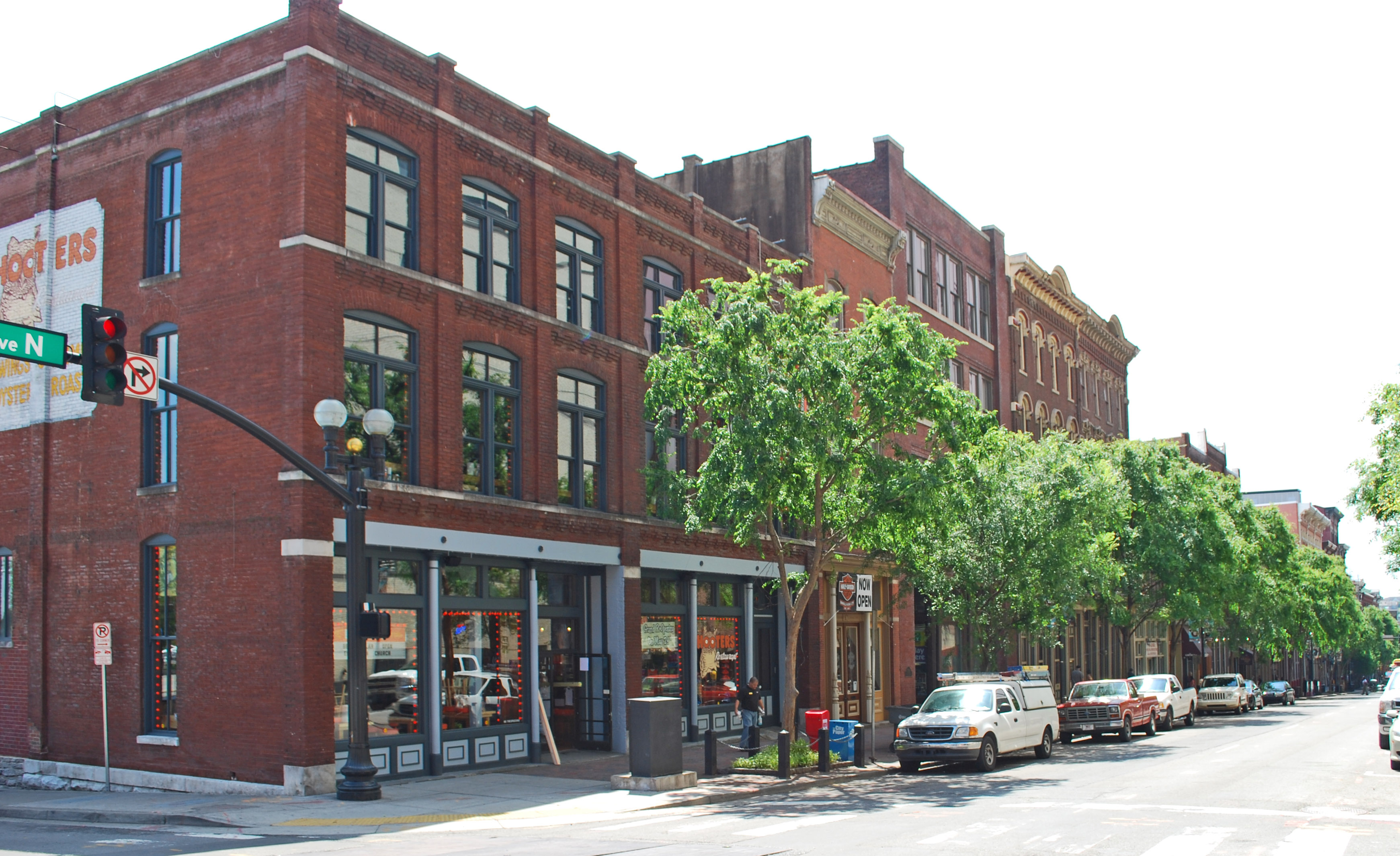
- A block of the district in 2010.
- Location: Nashville, Tennessee, US
- Coordinates: 36°09′50″N 86°46′35″W
- NRHP reference No.: 72001237
- Added to NRHP: February 23, 1972

The Second Avenue Commercial District is a historic district in Nashville, Tennessee, consisting of Second Avenue North between Brandon Street and Broadway. It was listed on the National Register of Historic Places on February 2, 1972.

== History ==
Buildings in the district, located along Second Avenue, were constructed in the 1870s and 1880s. Second Avenue was originally named Market Street, as it connected industrial and commercial areas of Nashville. Its name was changed to Second Avenue in 1903.

The Second Avenue Historic Preservation Overlay District is a coextensive district created by the local government. It was established in March 1997 by the Metropolitan Historic Zoning Commission (MHZC), which is part of the Metropolitan Government of Nashville and Davidson County. Exterior alterations in the overlay district require approval from the MHZC.

=== Incidents ===
A fire in 1985 damaged three buildings in the districts, resulting in their demolition; the other buildings remain intact.

A bombing in 2020, which took place at the 160 block of Second Avenue North, damaged many buildings in the area, which is primarily a commercial district with shops, offices, restaurants, and honky-tonks.

== Architecture ==
Buildings in the district are noted for their cornices and brickwork. Primarily three and four stories tall, the buildings are mostly in the Victorian Italianate style (with a few being in the Commercial Style) and many overlook the Cumberland River.

One 1987 guidebook describes the district as "[o]ne of the most outstanding collections of cast-iron and masonry storefronts in the U.S."

== See also ==
- National Register of Historic Places listings in Davidson County, Tennessee
