= Morgan County Correctional Complex =

Maximum security prison in Tennessee

Coordinates: 36°06′48″N 84°32′21″W

- Interactive map of Morgan County Correctional Complex
- Location: 541 Wayne Cotton Morgan Drive Wartburg, Tennessee
- Status: open
- Security class: Maximum
- Capacity: 2,428
- Opened: 1980
- Managed by: Tennessee Department of Corrections
- Warden: Shawn Phillips

Morgan County Correctional Complex (MCCX) is a maximum security prison in unincorporated Morgan County, near Wartburg, Tennessee, operated by the Tennessee Department of Correction. It opened in 1980. An expansion was later completed which increased its capacity to 2,128 prisoners. The prison is accredited by the American Correctional Association. The current warden is Shawn Phillips.

When the Brushy Mountain Correctional Complex closed in June 2009, its functions and most inmates and staff were transferred to the Morgan County Correctional Complex.

== Notable prisoners ==
Inmate Name	Register Number	Status	Details
Zachary Adams	00426285 / 1210691	Serving a life sentence without parole.	One of the convicted perpetrators of the 2011 disappearance and Murder of Holly Bobo.
Travis Reinking	00637563 / 04568013	Serving a life sentence without parole.	Perpetrator of the 2018 Nashville Waffle House shooting in which he murdered four people before being disarmed by James Shaw Jr. Ran away from the crime scene, and was later captured.

- Byron Looper - murderer and former politician; was held at Morgan County at the time of his death in 2013.
- Perry March - former Nashville lawyer convicted in 2006 of killing his wife ten years earlier; currently incarcerated at Northeast Correctional Complex.
- Brandon Vandenburg - rapist in Vanderbilt rape case, serving 17 years.
- Steven Hugueley was sentenced to death in 2003 for stabbing a prison counselor at Hardeman County Correctional Center. He used a homemade knife, stabbing the counselor 36 times until the knife broke. Hugueley had killed before: his mother in 1986 and a prison inmate in 1992. He tried to take the life of another prisoner in 1998. He was found dead in 2021, days after the state requested an execution date for him.
