= Burnette Chapel shooting =

2017 mass shooting in Tennessee, U.S.

- Location: 36.0468°N 86.5830°W; The Burnette Chapel Church of Christ, Antioch, Tennessee
- Date: September 24, 2017; 11:15 a.m.
- Target: White American churchgoers
- Attack type: Mass shooting, hate crime, domestic terrorism
- Weapons: 9mm Ruger SR9C semi-automatic handgun; .40-caliber Smith & Wesson SD40VE semi-automatic handgun
- Deaths: 1 (Melanie Crow)
- Injuries: 8 (7 by gunfire, including the perpetrator)
- Perpetrator: Emanuel Kidega Samson
- Defender: Robert Engle
- Motive: Black nationalism, revenge for Charleston church shooting

A mass shooting occurred on September 24, 2017, when a gunman opened fire at the Burnette Chapel Church of Christ in Antioch, Tennessee, part of the Greater Nashville area, killing one person and injuring six others.

The perpetrator was identified as Emanuel Kidega Samson, a 25-year-old native of Sudan. Samson was arrested after getting into an altercation with a bystander, and charged with first-degree murder and 43 other charges. The suspect indicated that the attack was an act of revenge for the 2015 Charleston church shooting.

== Shooting ==
The gunman carried two handguns (leaving behind a .22-caliber Citadel 1911-22 Tactical semi-automatic pistol and a .223-caliber DPMS A-15 semi-automatic rifle in his blue Nissan Xterra), and after fatally shooting Melanie Crow outside, he entered the church from the rear, according to police. He then walked through the church, shooting six more people.

At this point, according to police, the gunman was confronted by an usher, 22-year-old Robert Engle, whom he pistol-whipped. During the ensuing struggle, Samson accidentally shot himself in the chest. Engle ran to his car to get his own gun (a Ruger SR45) and pointed it at the wounded Samson until police arrived to arrest him. Engle was called a "hero" by police.

Around 50 parishioners were in the church at the time of the shooting, which was reported at 11:15 a.m. local time as church services were ending.

== Victims ==
The deceased woman was identified as 38-year-old Melanie Crow. She was first shot once in the face, then in the back three times when she attempted to flee the gunman, with bullets striking her heart, liver, rib, and kidney. Six other people aged between 60 and 83 were injured by gunfire; their injuries were non-life-threatening.

== Perpetrator ==
The gunman, Emanuel Kidega Samson (born November 11, 1991), was a 25-year-old Sudanese native residing legally in the United States, having arrived as a child in 1996. He was allegedly carrying two handguns, a 9mm and a .40-caliber, and was wearing a ski mask at the time of the attack.

Samson had been licensed to work as an unarmed security guard from 2014 to 2016, although his license was expired and he had been seeking its reinstatement. Samson is a former member of the Burnette Chapel Church.

A review of Samson's Facebook page by the Southern Poverty Law Center (SPLC) found sympathies and interests to black supremacist figures and groups like the New Black Panther Party and the Nation of Islam, as well as an affinity for conspiracy theories. In the days leading up to the shooting, he posted "several cryptic messages" on his Facebook page.

Samson had two domestic disputes with his girlfriend in Murfreesboro in January and February earlier that year, but was not arrested. Three months earlier, he reportedly told his father that he was about to commit suicide, which prompted a police response.

Samson was charged with first-degree murder immediately subsequent to the shooting. In a police interview, Samson suggested he was hearing voices and had a vision of the Burnette Chapel Church. A psychiatrist testified in April 2019 that Samson had schizoaffective disorder bipolar type.

Samson was scheduled to appear in Davidson County General Sessions court on September 27, and was being held at a county jail without bond. He allegedly had additional weapons in his vehicle, as well as a note that referenced the Charleston church shooting of 2015, in which a white supremacist murdered nine African Americans. The prosecution later claimed that Samson hoped to "kill at least 10 white people" in the shooting as revenge for the Charleston church shooting.

On October 6, it was reported that a preliminary hearing had been set for October 23, 2017.

== Aftermath and reactions ==
Nashville Mayor Megan Barry said, "This is a terrible tragedy for our city. My heart aches for the family and friends of the deceased as well as for the wounded victims and their loved ones."

Tennessee Governor Bill Haslam said he was "praying for the victims and committed to supporting the Antioch community in the aftermath of this tragedy." The Federal Bureau of Investigation and the U.S. Department of Justice both launched civil rights investigations.

== Trial ==
Samson was indicted on 43 charges, including first-degree murder, aggravated assault, and civil rights intimidation. His trial began on May 20, 2019. Prosecutors argued that Samson arrived at the church with the intention of killing 10 white churchgoers as retaliation for the 2015 Charleston church shooting, in which 9 African-American churchgoers were killed by a white supremacist. Samson's defense argued that Samson's actions were not premeditated, and were instead spontaneous and intended to effectuate his suicide.

Jurors deliberated for less than five hours before delivering the verdict against Emanuel Kidega Samson, and on May 24, the jury found him guilty of all 43 counts in the indictment, including first-degree murder and attempted murder. On May 28, 2019, Samson was sentenced to life in prison without the possibility of parole as the District Attorney did not seek the death penalty.

Emanuel Kidega Samson is currently incarcerated in the Riverbend Maximum Security Institution.

== See also ==
- Nashville Waffle House shooting
- 2020 Nashville bombing
