= Nashville school shooting =

Nashville school shooting may refer to:

- 2023 Covenant School shooting
- 2025 Antioch High School shooting

== See also ==
- Nashville shooting
