= Murder of Janet March =

1996 murder in Tennessee; husband convicted despite absence of body

- Janet March
- Date: August 15, 1996
- Location: Forest Hills, Tennessee, U.S.; 36.07615°N 86.85302°W
- Convicted: Perry and Arthur March
- Charges: Second-degree murder, tampering with evidence, abuse of a corpse, two counts of conspiring to commit first-degree murder, (Perry only) grand larceny
- Trial: 2006
- Verdict: Guilty on all counts
- Sentence: 56 years (Perry), 5 years (Arthur)
- Litigation: March v. Levine, March v. Sexton, March v. McAllister

On August 29, 1996, Janet Gail March (née Levine February 20, 1963 – August 15, 1996), a children's book illustrator from the Nashville suburb of Forest Hills, Tennessee, United States, was reported missing to police by her family. Her husband, attorney Perry March, told police he had last seen his wife when she left the house on the night of August 15, two weeks earlier, following an argument. Perry claimed Janet had packed her bags for a twelve-day vacation at an unknown location and driven away. She was never seen alive by anyone else afterwards.

Janet's car was found at a nearby apartment complex a week after the police report, showing signs of having been there for some time. Other evidence suggested that Perry had fabricated some evidence of his wife's supposed motive for departure and attempted to tamper with or destroy other items that might have provided evidence. Police soon reclassified the case as a homicide, despite the absence of Janet's body, and named Perry as a suspect. Shortly afterwards, Perry moved back to his native Chicago area with the couple's two children. After his in-laws won visitation rights, he fled with the children to Mexico, where his father, Arthur, a former United States Army pharmacist, had retired. The case received attention in the national media, where it was the subject of two segments on the CBS News program 48 Hours.

For several years afterwards, Perry fought his former in-laws in state and federal court over the administration of Janet's property and the status of his children. Janet was declared legally dead in 2000. Police continued investigating the case and found further evidence suggesting Perry had in fact murdered Janet. In late 2004, a grand jury indicted Perry on murder and other charges in her death; it was kept secret by police until the following year, when they were able to arrange for him to be arrested in Mexico and extradited to Tennessee to face trial. While in jail, police learned that Perry was conspiring with his father and another inmate to have his in-laws killed; Arthur was then arrested and extradited himself. After telling prosecutors that he had helped Perry move Janet's body to Kentucky, he agreed to cooperate with them and testify against his son in exchange for a reduced sentence; however he was unable to recall exactly where he had disposed of the body, which has never been found. Arthur's plea bargain was rejected and he died in federal custody shortly after beginning his sentence.

Perry was convicted of all charges in 2006, despite the absence of Janet's body. He unsuccessfully appealed the conviction in state court, alleging some of the evidence had been gathered in violation of his constitutional rights. A federal appellate panel reviewing his later habeas petition agreed that the case presented some issues but did not feel it had the statutory authority to overturn the conviction on those grounds; and in any event it found the evidence against Perry had been so overwhelming as to make those issues harmless error. In 2015, the United States Supreme Court denied his certiorari petition, exhausting his appeals. He has maintained his innocence throughout the case, and is currently serving his fifty-six-year sentence at Tennessee's Morgan County Correctional Complex.

== Background ==
Perry March and Janet Levine met as undergraduate students at the University of Michigan (or Michigan) in the early 1980s. Both Perry and Janet had been educated at exclusive private schools in their respective communities.

=== Perry and Arthur March ===
Perry Avram March was born in 1961 to Arthur and Tziporah March. His father, a pharmacist, changed his surname from Markovich in 1956 after the United States Army, which often called him to duty from the reserves while he worked in healthcare administration, kept misspelling it on checks. Both of Perry's parents were of Eastern European and Jewish ancestry, his paternal grandfather having been an immigrant from Romania and his maternal grandparents having emigrated to Israel from Minsk. The couple had two more children following Perry.

In 1970, Perry's mother died under circumstances that are not entirely clear. Arthur later claimed her death was the result of anaphylactic shock brought on by the Darvon she had taken to relieve pain from a head injury. Her state and city death certificates, however, report the death was an accidental drug overdose. It was widely assumed to the family's acquaintances that Tziporah had taken her own life; doctors later consulted by a Nashville journalist reporting on the case said that anaphylactic shock was similar enough to the effects of suicide by Darvon as to be a credible cover story and that suicides at the decedent's residence were often officially described as accidents during that time period.

Following Tziporah's death, the March family moved to their vacation home at Michiana, Michigan. Arthur sent Perry to La Lumiere School in La Porte, Indiana, where he excelled in academics and athletics. In his spare time, Perry took karate classes, eventually reaching the rank of first-degree black belt. Arthur retired from the Army in 1978, having attained the rank of lieutenant colonel; his pension was his chief income afterward.

After graduating with honors, Perry chose to attend the University of Michigan due to the lower tuition he paid as an in-state student, a strong consideration given his father's limited income. He was also attracted by the university's Asian studies program and made that his major. Those who knew Perry at Michigan recall him as having some "rough edges." At the time of the murder, a Michigan alumna came forward and claimed he had hit her in the face while the two were at the school, which Perry denied.

=== Janet Levine ===
Janet Gail Levine was born on February 20, 1963, to Lawrence Levine, a native of New York State who had earned undergraduate and law degrees from Michigan, and his wife Carolyn. At the time he was building an insurance defense practice that grew into the firm of Levine, Orr and Geracioti, led him to become one of the most prominent lawyers in Nashville and made him socially prominent within the city's Jewish community. Janet was the first of their two children. Aspiring to become an artist, Janet had already exhibited her work in Nashville's Jewish Community Center and several local restaurants by the time she graduated high school. After attending the prestigious University School of Nashville, where she had been vice president of her class, she was accepted at her father's alma mater as well.

Janet's friends recalled her passionate interest in art, to the point of embodying common stereotypes of artists. She was known to go to Chicago on shopping trips without much notice. A friend noted that Janet had not only designed a prototype for a collapsible baby chair, but patented it; however, she never attempted to explore its commercial prospects. She was often "forgetful and late," but friends tolerated her lapses due to her better qualities. However, they also said that she could be difficult to deal with when angered.

=== The March marriage ===
Shortly after she had begun her sophomore year at Michigan, Janet's roommate introduced her to Perry. After his graduation from Michigan, the couple moved to Chicago; Perry found work as a futures broker for Oppenheimer & Co. while Janet took art classes at the Art Institute. Growing homesick, Janet persuaded her parents to pay Perry's tuition at Vanderbilt University Law School, where he excelled academically and became a member of the law review. Classmates later recalled him as a driven competitor and tough negotiator who was focused on being financially successful.

Following Perry and Janet's wedding in 1987, her parents put up the money for the newlyweds to buy a house in a desirable area of Nashville. Perry graduated a year later and, despite offers from prominent New York City firms, took a job at Bass, Berry & Sims (Bass Berry), a Nashville firm specializing in financial law, where he was one of the first Jews the predominantly WASPy firm had hired full-time. Meanwhile, Janet began illustrating children's books. Their first child, a son named Samson, was born in 1990; daughter Tziporah followed in 1994.

Arthur also moved to Nashville around this time. After his Michigan house had been foreclosed, Lawrence had bought the property from the bank and leased it back to his son-in-law's father. Arthur later claimed that Lawrence initially let him live in the house without paying rent before encouraging him to move to Nashville to be closer to his son and grandson. However, records in Berrien County showed that Lawrence ended the lease for nonpayment of rent early in 1987 and sold the house a year later. When Arthur did come to Nashville, the Levines let him live in their house and loaned him money to allow him to establish himself there. Nevertheless, he declared bankruptcy in 1991.

During his time in Nashville, Arthur often told people he had retired from the Army as a full colonel, had served with the Green Berets and had been sent on missions to Israel, a claim contradicted by his service records.

==== 1990s marital difficulties ====
While his father was dealing with bankruptcy, Perry was facing his own career setback. A paralegal at Bass Berry found the first of a series of anonymous typewritten letters on her desk, containing lewd messages from a secret admirer. Upon being informed of the letters, management at Bass Berry, with the help of an outside investigator, set up a hidden camera monitoring an obscure volume on tax law in the firm's library where the writer asked the paralegal to leave a note if she was interested in initiating an affair. The writer turned out to be Perry.

Perry was subsequently confronted with the choice of resigning or being fired, with the former option available only if he sought some sort of professional help. The paralegal, angry that Bass Berry seemed to be taking its time letting March make up his mind, quit after returning from a vacation; shortly afterwards Perry himself was let go. He agreed to pay the paralegal US$25,000 over the next four years, with the first US$12,500 half in monthly installments and the last half as a lump sum at the end of that time, to avoid a sexual harassment suit. Perry kept the payments secret from Janet. Shortly afterwards, the couple began seeing a marriage counselor.

By 1993, Perry had admitted to Carolyn Levine, his mother-in-law, that the couple were having problems in their marriage. His career continued at Levine Orr, his father-in-law's firm, where he represented some locally high-profile clients and sometimes performed pro bono work for the Jewish Community Center, where he was also a member of the board. Janet continued her artistic career, often taking her lunch alone in local restaurants where she worked with her sketch pad. She remained aloof from her friends and did not discuss her marriage in detail with them, although some said she sometimes seemed depressed.

The next year Janet gave birth to a daughter, Tziporah, named after Perry's late mother. It was time to move their growing family to a larger house, and they bought a 4 acres (1.6 ha) lot in the affluent suburb of Forest Hills on Nashville's south side, where they spent 1995 building a US$650,000 stone house in a "country-French" style to Janet's specifications. Contractors who worked on the 5,300 sq ft (490 m^{2}) home recalled Janet, who was heavily involved in the project, as particularly difficult. They said she always threatened to go to her husband or her father, who held the note on the house along with his own wife, when there was even a small dispute. When Perry did respond to her calls, they said, he was often more reasonable.

==== 1996 ====
The Marches' marital difficulties worsened following the move. Although Perry had begun seeing a psychiatrist, and Janet sometimes accompanied him on those visits, as well as going on her own, he began to spend nights away from the house. Some friends claimed later that they saw him in the company of other women. He asked a client who owned a popular nightclub in downtown Nashville if he could move into his spare condominium.

When Perry was home, he and Janet continued to argue, sometimes in front of the children, which led Carolyn to tell him he had to leave the house if that continued. Perry told her that he believed Janet was considering a divorce. During the summer, the two began seeing the psychiatrist again together, again arguing with each other so vehemently in his office that he suggested a trial separation; Perry later said he had rented a house for that purpose but had not moved into it yet. In one of their last sessions, he recalled, Janet asked Perry if he had told the psychiatrist why he had had to leave Bass Berry, which he had previously explained to the psychiatrist as being due to conflict with a coworker.

A neighbor recalled to The New York Times that Perry "had a really bad temper", getting into a shouting match with an elderly neighbor and yelling at others when they came up the cul-de-sac the new home was at the end of. In mid-August, when the final US$12,500 payment to the former Bass Berry paralegal would have been due, he wrote her a letter saying he was having trouble coming up with the money and asking if she could wait until October 1996.

Janet may have finally reached the point of ending the marriage. Deneane Beard, the Marches' cleaning lady, recalled seeing a book on divorce on Janet's night table earlier in 1996. On August 14, Ella Goldshmid, the children's nanny, who came two days a week, said that instead of chatting with her on her arrival as she normally did, Janet, more withdrawn than usual, said she would be working on the computer all day, and closed the office door behind her, something she said Janet had never done before. The next day, friends of Janet who saw or talked to her said she also seemed distracted and a little afraid of Perry. Janet and Carolyn made an appointment to see a divorce lawyer on August 16.

== Disappearance ==
On August 15, two cabinetmakers who had worked on the house during its construction came to the March house in the afternoon to do warranty work, installing two countertops in the kitchen and tightening a faucet. Janet supervised them closely while Perry played with the children. They completed their work within an hour and left, the last people outside her family to have seen Janet.

That evening, after the children had been put to bed, Perry, who had spent most of his nights the previous two weeks at local hotels, claims he and Janet started arguing again. Around 8 p.m., he said, he offered to go to a hotel for the night. Instead, he said, she announced she was leaving for a short vacation to somewhere she would not share with him. According to Perry, she packed some clothes into two bags and a suitcase, got into her gray Volvo 850 with her passport, US$1,500 in cash and a bag of marijuana. After leaving him a written list of things to do in her absence, he says, she left the house around 8:30 p.m.

Shortly after 9 p.m., records show, Perry made phone calls to family and friends telling them Janet had left him and the children. He called first his brother and then his sister, both of whom still lived in the Chicago area. At 10 p.m., he told Laurel Rummel, a lifelong friend of Janet's in whom he had confided about the couple's marital problems as well, that Janet had left. At midnight, he called his in-laws. Carolyn Levine said later that it struck her as unlike Janet to walk out after a fight, but told Perry at the time to have Janet call her whenever she returned.

=== Aftermath and family investigation ===
The next morning Janet's absence was noted by several visitors to the house. Beard arrived for her regularly scheduled housecleaning sometime between 8 and 8:30 a.m. She testified later that it seemed the house had already been cleaned, and that Perry told her not to clean the children's playroom. He explained Janet's absence by saying she had gone to California on a business trip. When Ella Goldshmid, the Marches' part-time nanny, arrived between 9:30 and 10 a.m., Perry told her as well that Janet had gone to California, but explained that she was visiting her brother Mark, who at the time was practicing law in Los Angeles. Ella said later that whenever Janet had traveled away from Nashville, she had always let her know in advance and had left instructions behind.

Beard had finished what cleaning she needed to do and left the house by the time the next visitor came. Marissa Moody brought her son over for a playdate with Samson March that she and Janet had arranged the day before. When she arrived around 10 a.m., she recalled, neither Janet nor Perry came out of the house to greet them, which made her feel snubbed since she felt the two kept her at arm's length. Samson let them in to the kitchen door, where he told them his mother was not home.

Samson, Moody recalled, was bouncing up and down on a rolled-up oriental rug that was on the floor space just outside the kitchen, next to the playroom Perry had told Beard not to clean. She thought this odd since the March house was decorated rather austerely, with the couple preferring exposed hardwood floors with minimal cover. After a few minutes, Samson went to get his father, who apparently had not known about the playdate but told Moody to go ahead with it. When she returned to pick up her son around 2 p.m., Perry was not there; he was instead having lunch with Rummel, with whom he was discussing plans for new carpet for his law office. Rummel said that while they were able to discuss that, Perry was sometimes emotional about Janet and had trouble focusing.

Initially the Levines believed Perry's account of their daughter's disappearance. After Marissa Moody had picked up her son, Perry returned to the house and drove his children to their house. He and Lawrence Levine then went to Nashville International Airport to search the parking lots for Janet's Volvo, which they did not find.

By Sunday night, August 17, Carolyn Levine began to worry since Janet had never left her children for so long without telling anyone. She wanted to call the police, but Perry and his brother Ron, who had come down from his home to help, persuaded the Levines to wait for the 12-day period that Janet's list for Perry suggested she would be gone for to expire. That night, Perry also called his father, who by this time had moved to a caretaker's cottage on an estate in Ajijic, on Lake Chapala in the Mexican state of Jalisco, a popular destination for many American retirees, particularly former military personnel, due to its low cost of living. Arthur told Perry he would come help him with the children and drove from there to Nashville, arriving several days later. On August 23, the Levines alleged in a later court filing, Perry began seeking to retain the services of a criminal defense attorney.

By that time, the end of the week, both Perry and his in-laws were beginning to fear Janet was in trouble, as Samson's sixth birthday party was to be held on August 25, the end of the 12-day period, and no one believed she would voluntarily miss that. Their own efforts to find her had been fruitless. Perry wanted to report her disappearance to the police; he says the Levines did not want to as they feared embarrassing Janet. They in turn later claimed he had resisted calling authorities.

Samson's birthday party went ahead as scheduled on August 25. Guests from outside the family were told a variant of one of Perry's accounts—that Janet had been visiting her brother in California, where she had contracted an ear infection that precluded her from flying home until it was cured. Many said later that they accepted this.

Arthur March attended his grandson's birthday party, but left for Chicago the next day. When Carolyn Levine asked her son-in-law why, he said his dad "ha[d] a big mouth [and] tells everything." Later he exclaimed "That fucking Janet has ruined my life!" Carolyn had never heard Perry talk that way about his wife before. On August 29, with Janet's whereabouts still unknown after two weeks, the Levines notified the Metropolitan Nashville Police Department (MNPD) that Janet was missing.

==== Janet's alleged list ====
Janet's family found the list she had supposedly given Perry of things to do while she was away to be the most troubling aspect of her disappearance. While she, like Perry, typically organized her instructions to others as lists, many aspects of this list were inconsistent with how she made hers:

- Janet, her mother said, usually either wrote out her lists by hand or dictated them for others to write down, instead of writing them on a computer and printing them out;
- When she did write, she used lower-case letters exclusively, whereas her list to Perry employed normal capitalization;
- Janet typically dated her lists at the top of the page, while the list was dated at the bottom, as Perry more commonly did.

The content of the list also raised questions. It did not mention the playdate Janet had scheduled for the following day with Marissa Moody, which Janet's family believes she would have included if she had written the list. Perry later disputed Moody's account, saying he, not Janet, had arranged the playdate.

Two members of Janet's family also later testified to incidents that further supported their belief that Perry had actually written the list. According to Carolyn Levine, when she helped Perry put the children to bed on the night after Janet disappeared, she noticed a yellow legal pad next to the Marches' computer with a handwritten list of chores, similar to those on Janet's list. At the top the words "two weeks" were written in Perry's handwriting and circled.

Mark Levine said that on a day when he and Perry had been at his parents' house shortly after Janet's disappearance, he had asked Perry if he could see the list on the Marches' computer. Perry agreed, and the two left for the Forest Hills house in their own cars. Mark said that Perry drove there very quickly and arrived earlier; when he got there the door was locked and Perry let him in only after he had rung the doorbell several times.

Perry let him see the file on the computer. He conceded at cross-examination later that he saw from the file's timestamp that it had been saved at 8:17 p.m. on August 15, consistent with Perry's account of Janet's actions that evening. But he also found another file, six pages long, single-spaced and unindented, that appeared to be a list made by Janet of times Perry had wronged her. While Perry told him he could print it out if he wanted, Mark did not know how to do so on the Marches' computer, and Perry did not explain. Mark was never able to print it out at any other time.

Later, the police detective who originally investigated the case found the timeframe odd, as well. The 12-day period would have made sense on its face since that would have had her return on Samson's birthday, he agreed. But by the time of her purported disappearance, invitations to Sammy's party on August 25, two days earlier, had been sent out to friends and family. He did not think Janet would have deliberately missed that.

== Police investigation ==
After taking the Levines' report, detectives looked through local hospital admissions and Janet's credit card and bank accounts, but found no trace of her. Janet's brother Mark had come to Nashville from California by this time, and recalled that shortly after the report was made an MNPD police car came to the Levines' house. Perry, who was also there, became so anxious at the sight that it took him several tries to stand up from his chair due to his uncontrollable shaking. He then asked Mark to call his own brother, Ron.

The first break in the case came a little over a week later, on September 7, when Janet's Volvo was found backed into a parking space at an apartment complex roughly 5 miles (8.0 km) from the house. Inside were most of the items Perry said Janet had taken when she left. The detective who processed the Volvo later testified that there was a layer of dust and pollen on the exterior, suggesting it had been parked there, unused, for some time. There were cobwebs in the wheel wells, and when the tires were removed, the brake rotors were found to have rust on them, further confirming this supposition. Inside, police found a purse with Janet's identification, credit cards, passport and $11 in cash; a suitcase packed with clothing and a small canvas bag with toiletry items. A gray suitcase Perry said Janet had taken was not in the vehicle. A 50-dollar bill was in the glove compartment.

The front passenger seat had been pushed back, while the drivers' seat was up close to the wheel. On the floor in front, the former detectives found a pair of Janet's white sandals. The footwear appeared to have been "carefully positioned", they later told a reporter, rather than discarded as a wearer might after taking them off. Investigators also considered it unusual that while Janet's suitcase had been packed with sundresses a woman might wear at that time of year, she had apparently not packed any bras. Nor did her toiletry bag contain any toothpaste or hairbrush.

That same day, a private investigator hired by the Levines spoke to Perry. She noted that he referred to Janet in the past tense. After the interview, she went to the apartment complex where Janet's car was found and attempted to speak to residents there about whether they might have seen anyone leave the Volvo there. Perry apparently found out she was doing so and called her, angrily demanding that she fax him a list of everyone she had talked to and what they said after she was done, then hung up.

Five days later, the MNPD searched Perry's Jeep. The same detective who had searched Janet's Volvo later testified that hair and fiber evidence was recovered from the back seat. He admitted under cross-examination that the vehicle did not appear to have been cleaned recently, but said he did smell some type of cleaner or disinfectant.

On September 10, police interviewed Perry. The detective said he appeared nervous as he was advised of his rights to avoid self-incrimination and refuse consent for a search of his house, rights Perry said he understood as a practicing attorney. He wrote out by hand a statement giving his account of what happened on the night of August 15.

Perry took the children to Chicago over the next weekend, September 14–15, to observe the Rosh Hashanah holiday with his family, although Arthur did not accompany them as Perry said he could not afford the trip. During this time, the MNPD obtained a search warrant for the March house and told March's lawyer on September 16 that they intended to execute it the next day. When they did, they discovered that the computer's hard drive had been forcibly removed and could not be found.

The police further investigated Perry's actions since the disappearance. They found that on August 21, almost a week afterwards, he had gone to a local tire store and bought new tires for his Jeep. The tire store owner told them that the existing tires were in excellent condition and he did not see why Perry would have wanted them changed. Perry said he had wanted a different brand. Records also showed that before the disappearance Janet typically used only a Visa credit card and Perry put most of his purchases on a MasterCard, but Janet had not used either since the disappearance while Perry had used both.

== Suspicion of Perry March ==
Shortly after the search, Perry moved his children to the Chicago area. He rented a house in Wilmette, where his brother lived, and took most of his and Janet's possessions with him. Andrew Saks, a friend who helped him pack on September 18, recalls that Perry seemed businesslike but aggravated at that time. At one point he said that he wanted to "fuck the Levines and fuck the Nashville police", which Saks found alarming; he noted later that Perry did not respond to his offer to help find Janet.

Saks' wife Diane, a longtime friend of Janet's, also later gave testimony to a possibly incriminating remark made by Perry. She was speaking with him on the phone after his move to Chicago when he suddenly asked if she thought he had killed Janet. Before she could answer, Perry elaborated, asking what she might say if he told her that he had put Janet's body in the back of her car, driven away with the children sleeping alone in the house, and returned "like nothing ever happened?" After that, Andrew told Perry not to call them anymore.

By the time Perry left the Nashville area the Levines had come to believe this scenario. Many of the Marches' friends came to agree, since Perry had never returned their calls offering support or reached out to them. After the police announced they were treating the case as a homicide, with Perry as their suspect, local media reported on the case. It preoccupied the Nashville area during Fall of 1996 as no local crime had since the Marcia Trimble rape and murder almost 20 years earlier.

The police brought in Army helicopters, divers, cadaver dogs, and thermal imaging devices as they searched the area's woods for Janet's body. Perry's lawyer informed the police his client would no longer cooperate with them and that they would need a warrant for any future searches of his property. Suspicion deepened in November when Perry did not attend Janet's memorial service; a friend who said he was not yet convinced of Perry's guilt was discreetly told by an intermediary that he should not come to visit the Levines while they sat shiva for their daughter, to avoid any awkwardness.

In early 1997, the Nashville Scene alternative weekly ran a two-part article about the case that disclosed some new information such as the content of the letters Perry had left for the Bass Berry paralegal in 1991 and the questions about his mother's death. It outlined the police theory of the case at that point: that Perry had killed Janet, in all likelihood unintentionally, perhaps through a hold he might have learned through his karate studies (which an instructor told the Scene he would have been capable of doing at the black belt level), fabricated the list and then taken Janet's Volvo to where it was found, packing his mountain bike in the car so he could return home. They believed he had hidden her body, perhaps initially in the rug Marissa Moody saw (but, at the time, no one else claimed to) and then later somewhere more permanent, possibly with his father's help.

Perry was interviewed for the article at his home in Wilmette. He compared himself to Richard Jewell, wrongly suspected of the Centennial Olympic Park bombing that summer, and said that he was arranging financing to buy his father-in-law's share of the house and return to Nashville, where he could start his own law firm. "I will not allow one misguided police officer, one vengeful man, and a few low-life journalists to destroy what I've taken years to build," he told the reporter. He also threatened to file defamation suits against the former Michigan classmate who had accused him of assaulting her, The Tennessean newspaper (whose spokesman told the Scene that neither Perry nor his lawyer had complained to the paper about the accuracy of its reporting on the case), and Bass Berry, although Perry's lawyer said he did not think his client would follow through on those threats.

Although Lawrence Levine declined to comment, the Scene reported that he was equally committed to seeing that Perry faced justice for killing Janet. None of his friends or law partners would talk on the record. "When Larry is lucid," said one who was not identified, "all he can talk about is destroying Perry."

== Civil litigation ==
Perry's determination to emerge triumphant, and his father-in-law's resolve to destroy him, reflected civil litigation between Perry and his in-laws that commenced shortly after his move to the Chicago area. In October, Perry filed a petition in Davidson County probate court to have himself appointed the administrator of Janet's assets in her absence. The Levines opposed this, and filed their own motion, first in Tennessee and then in Cook County, Illinois, family court for grandparent visitation rights, which Perry opposed with equal vigor. In 2003, a Tennessee Court of Appeals judge writing for the majority in the last decision in the case called it "[31] months of what can only be described as trench warfare"; a dissenting judge agreed that "the acrimonious relation of the parties is resplendent in these proceedings".

In the probate proceeding, the trial court quickly appointed a conservator to protect Janet's property while the parties resolved their dispute. It warned that given the difficult relationship between them, Janet's liquid assets would soon be depleted if the parties continued, which would force the court to require the sale of personal property to which either or both might ascribe great sentimental value. After Perry moved, the Levines argued that when the court ordered Perry to return some of these personal items, he either did not or returned them in a damaged condition. At one point, they claimed, he had moved some of it to Hammond, Indiana, without telling them until they showed up to pick it up, purely, they alleged, to inconvenience them. Perry also refused to be deposed initially, and then walked out when he was; all these actions led to contempt citations against him, which he initially appealed.

The Levines filed their visitation petition at the time Perry moved with his children to Wilmette. Perry argued that their real goal was to allow the police and/or the media to interview Samson, which he did not want to permit (in any event, he claimed, the boy was asleep when Janet left). During an October deposition in the case, Perry invoked his Fifth Amendment rights against self-incrimination in response to 15 questions, including when asked if he had killed his wife. This made headlines in the Nashville media and further reinforced the public's perception that he had indeed done so, although legal experts said that was the only thing he could do in that situation.

Other evidence that would later be used against Perry came from activities associated with these lawsuits. Carolyn Levine was searching the Forest Hills house in early 1997, after Perry had moved and taken most of the family's possessions to Chicago with him. In the garage, she found two envelopes with the logo of a company only Janet used and her name handwritten on them, both containing typewritten letters. These turned out to be the originals of the ones Perry had sent copies of to the Bass Berry paralegal in 1991, and Carolyn called the police. They theorized that perhaps Janet had discovered these, confronted Perry with them and demanded a divorce that night, which led to his murderous reaction.

In March 1999 a court-appointed Chicago-area family lawyer visited Perry at his house to interview him in the visitation case. She testified later that there were no photographs or other mementoes of Janet in the house, which she found disturbing. After she filed a report recommending visitation be granted, she said Perry became angry with her and threatened to disappear with the children to Singapore.

== Mexico ==
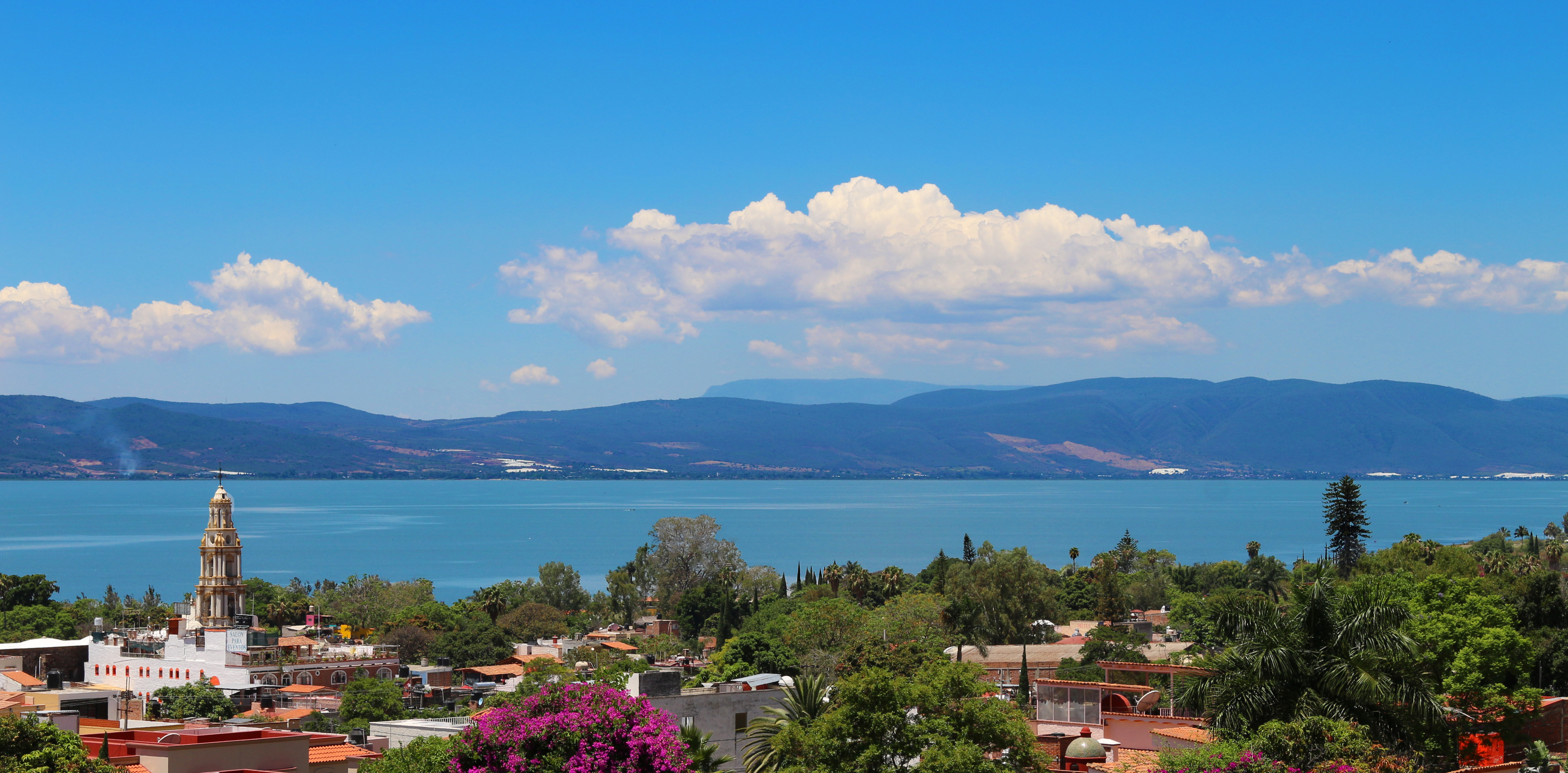
Ajijic, where Perry moved with the children in 1999

The court awarded the Levines visitation late in 1999. When they arrived in Wilmette to pick up the children, however, Ron March, one of his brother's attorneys at that time, told them that Perry had moved with them to his father's residence in Mexico. "I brought Perry down here because he didn't have any other place to go", Arthur explained to CBS News later. Within a week of settling down, Perry met a local woman, Carmen Rojas, whom he soon married.

Back in Nashville, the Levines responded by amending their probate claim to include a wrongful death allegation against Perry. To support it they had Janet declared legally dead. Perry, disbarred earlier that year for misconduct unrelated to his disputes with the Levines, did not appear in court himself, nor retain any lawyer, to defend himself, and so default judgment was awarded to the Levines. He was ordered to pay them US$113.5 million, which he then appealed.

=== Levines' attempt to retake children ===
In May 2000, the Levines came to Ajijic to demand that Perry grant them their visitation rights. He and his father refused to let them see the children, and they returned to Nashville. A month later, the Levines returned. This time they had a Mexican court order as well, and they were able to have Perry arrested by Mexican authorities on charges that he had violated the terms of his visa. He was later able to get the charges dropped, but while he was occupied doing so, the Levines went to the children's school, outran a pursuing Arthur March to the airport and took them back to Nashville. The visitation order limited them to 39 days with the children, but they immediately began taking steps toward obtaining permanent custody of them.

While the Levines believed they were acting in accordance with the laws of both countries, Perry considered their action an abduction. Two Tennessee lawyers who agreed with that assessment contacted Perry and agreed to represent him pro bono. They brought an action in federal court to have the children returned to Perry in Mexico under the International Child Abduction Remedies Act, which implemented the Hague Convention on the Civil Aspects of International Child Abduction in U.S. federal law. "The bottom line is that this treaty says that you can't steal children and try to make custody determinations in the jurisdiction where you stole them to", Perry told CBS.

In response, the Levines argued that they had rightful custody of the children once they returned to the United States due to the visitation order, that the children's habitual residence under the convention was in Illinois, not Mexico; and that letting them live with Perry again would create a grave risk of harm and violate human rights and international freedoms. They also claimed Perry could not bring the case since he was a fugitive from justice at the time he left for Mexico due to outstanding contempt warrants from the earlier cases.

In October, Judge Aleta Arthur Trauger held for Perry. The evidentiary record, she said, established that the children's habitual residence was Mexico at the time. While the Levines believed Perry had killed their daughter and had won a civil judgment against him on those grounds, they never alleged that the children witnessed it and did not otherwise establish a reasonable possibility that they might be harmed in Perry's care. And while Perry did face outstanding contempt citations, that did not meet the criteria established in case law for barring his petition as a fugitive. Therefore, she said, the Levines had to return the children to Perry once the 39 days expired.

Trauger stayed her decision so the parties could appeal it to the Sixth Circuit Court of Appeals. The Levines argued that every aspect of the decision was in error; Perry argued in his cross-appeal that they had no standing to even offer a defense. A three-judge panel heard oral arguments in March 2001; Mark Levine argued for his parents.

A month later the panel unanimously upheld the district court. Judge Richard Fred Suhrheinrich wrote that Trauger's opinion had been "well-reasoned" enough for the appeals court to adopt it in full. Most of his opinion was devoted to elaborating on it and rebuking the Levines. Perry could not have been a fugitive at the time he moved to Mexico, he wrote, since the contempt citations were issued after he went there. He noted that the contempt orders from the probate court stemmed from his failure to return to the Levines a beaded evening bag and a baby blanket, which he called "patently insignificant grounds" for what he characterized as "the Levines' vindictive attempt to deprive March of his day in court". He also noted that the Levines exceeded the authority of the Mexican court order, which only allowed them to take the children as far as Guadalajara, and that by taking them back to Nashville the Levines and their son had incurred kidnapping charges in Mexico, for which an arrest warrant (later dismissed) had been issued.

=== Wrongful death judgment overturned ===
After the children were returned to him, Perry settled into his life in Mexico, working as a business and financial adviser and starting a cafe with his wife. In 2003, he won another legal victory against the Levines, when the Tennessee Court of Appeals overturned the wrongful-death judgment against him. The two-judge majority found that the Levines had offered no new evidence that Perry had killed Janet when they amended their claim to include wrongful death almost three years into the probate litigation, an undue delay, and that Perry's misbehavior did not warrant a default judgment against him in that case, especially since he had offered to be deposed either by telephone or in Mexico.

The majority did, however, deny Perry his motion for dismissal of the wrongful death claim on the merits, since the case was purely procedural. The dissenting judge argued that the majority had too narrowly construed the precedents the trial court relied on, and that the issue of Janet's possible death at Perry's hands had been a part of the proceedings from the beginning. For instance, he noted, the Levines had been barred from asking Perry about it in depositions.

== Arrest and jail ==
The resolution of the civil cases in Perry's favor did not deter the MNPD. Despite the continuing absence of her body, two detectives on the department's cold case squad began looking into Janet's disappearance again. Perry's business activities in Mexico had made him some enemies there, where many expatriates who had done business with him accused him of fraud. The detectives learned that in 2001, Perry threatened a Mexican lawyer and his client that "he would do away with us the way he did with his wife."

In late 2004 the two detectives and prosecutors began secretly presenting evidence against Perry to a grand jury. After hearing 59 witnesses, it returned an indictment on charges of second-degree murder, tampering with evidence and abuse of a corpse. The indictment, like the proceedings that produced it, remained secret while prosecutors worked with the Federal Bureau of Investigation and the Mexican government to secure the paperwork for Perry's arrest and extradition.

In August 2005, Perry was arrested at his restaurant as he prepared to open for the day. He was taken to Guadalajara International Airport and put on a plane to Los Angeles. Once it landed, Mexican authorities turned him over to the FBI and he was arrested on the charges he had been indicted for. The Levines initiated another action for full custody of the grandchildren, which ultimately succeeded.

On the plane to Nashville, Perry was escorted by Pat Postiglione, one of the two cold case detectives. Perry began to talk to him, although Postiglione reminded him that he had no legal obligation to do so. Perry said he wanted to talk anyway, and made some admissions related to the case. He told the detective it was "time to close this chapter in my life" and said he was willing to plead guilty if he could be assured a sentence of no more than seven years. If such an agreement were reached with the prosecution, he promised to be completely honest. Postiglione said he would relay that information to the district attorney's office.

"Prior to the Janet incident," Perry told Postiglione, "I have not been involved in any other criminal-type activity." He asked about what life was like in prison, the difference between maximum and minimum security. Perry also wanted to know about the evidence against him, whether they had discovered Janet's body or not, and posed as a hypothetical question as to whether someone could be guilty of second-degree murder if the death was accidental. While he had loved Janet intensely, Perry told Postiglione, she had been portrayed somewhat idealistically in the media since her disappearance.

=== Plot to kill the Levines ===
On his return to Nashville, Perry was housed in the county jail. On his first night, he approached Russell Farris, another inmate who was awaiting trial for attempted murder and some other charges. At first, Perry asked him the same questions he had asked Postiglione about how to manage in prison. Later, he told Farris he wanted to talk more privately, which they were able to do through a crack in Farris's cell door.

According to Farris, Perry offered to have his bond posted if he would, in return, kill the Levines. Perry hoped to finance the bond by selling property in Mexico or perhaps receiving a cash advance for a novel he had written in 1997, in which a detective investigates the murder of a small, dark-haired woman. After a month of these conversations, Farris told his attorney, and the two went to the police. They arranged for his conversations with Perry to be surreptitiously recorded. Perry gave Farris Arthur's number in Mexico and a list of code words to use so Arthur would know Perry had authorized the call.

Farris was later transferred to the jail in neighboring Williamson County, telling Perry he had been released. Perry gave him the Levines' address on a piece of paper. After the transfer, authorities taped five separate phone conversations between Farris and Arthur. The older man told him the right time of day to go to the Levines, where to get a gun, what kind of gun to use, to wear surgical gloves the whole time, and how to get to Ajijic afterwards.

The plans seemed to go through as far as having Arthur go to the Guadalajara airport to meet Farris under his assumed name. When he arrived, an FBI agent, who had had him under surveillance, met him and told him the man had been detained by Mexican immigration authorities. Arthur then returned to Ajijic. Back in Nashville, Perry was arrested again and additionally charged with two counts of solicitation to commit murder by the Davidson County prosecutors, and two counts of conspiring to commit murder by federal prosecutors. Arthur, too, was charged with the same offenses by federal authorities but remained in Mexico, officially a fugitive. He claimed entrapment and promised that he would forcefully resist any attempt to extradite him.

=== Incriminating statements to other inmates ===
After Farris had been transferred to lead Perry to think he had been released, Perry made the acquaintance of Cornelius King, another inmate whose cell was next to his. He talked with King about his children and his life in Mexico. In one of their conversations, King testified later, Perry told him what had really happened with Janet the night she disappeared.

The two had been arguing about his infidelities; she said she was going to get a divorce and "take everything." Perry, King said, did not want that, and after that their fight became physical. Perry ultimately hit Janet over the head with a wrench, and claimed that since he had disposed of her body by burning it and pouring the ashes in a lake, he would be acquitted.

Another inmate, Reno Martin, had also had a cell next door to Perry. He recalled that one day Perry had returned from one of the child custody hearings visibly agitated. Upset by having to deal with the Levines again, Perry exclaimed "it should have been them that he had taken care of instead of ..." then suddenly stopped himself. Martin recalled that Perry looked pale afterwards.

== Trials ==
Perry was a convicted felon even before his murder trial began. In April 2006 he was found guilty of embezzling $23,000 from his father-in-law's firm over the two years before Janet disappeared. Two months later he was convicted of the murder-conspiracy charges.

Two months after that, almost ten years after Janet's disappearance, Perry's trial began. To avoid the effects of pretrial publicity in the Nashville area, jurors were selected from the Hamilton County pool in Chattanooga, and then taken to Nashville to be sequestered while they heard the case. Prosecutors presented a predominantly circumstantial case-in-chief against Perry, augmented by some forensic evidence and the incriminating statements Perry had made to Detective Postiglione, the Mexican lawyer, his jail neighbors and the Sakses. The manuscript of his novel was also entered into evidence.

Moody, Goldshmid and Beard testified to what they saw at the March house the morning after. Carolyn Levine testified to the couple's mounting marital problems, her appointment with Janet to see a divorce lawyer that day and Perry's complaint that Janet had ruined his life. Janet's college roommate, who had introduced her to Perry and later moved to Nashville herself to practice medicine, told the jury that Perry had threatened her after she talked to the media, and that she never knew Janet to back her car into a parking space.

The prosecution presented several witnesses to convince the jury that Perry had taken the Volvo to the apartment complex himself. A resident who worked for an airline testified that he had returned from work around 1 a.m. and seen a surprised Perry walking a mountain bike past him. The owner of a bicycle shop explained how a mountain bike could be transported in a sedan by using the quick release button to remove the front wheel, and said that a muddy stain on the floor of the Volvo in photographs taken of the car looked consistent with having been left by a bicycle tire. Finally the Volvo salesman who had sold the Marches the car said it was designed to hold a standard mountain bike with the front wheel removed.

Another detective said that lab tests had found that mitochondrial DNA in the hair from the back of the Volvo was consistent with samples recovered from Janet's hairbrush. His testimony was complemented by an FBI forensics technician who had analyzed fiber samples from the rear of Perry's Jeep. They were consistent with carpet fibers, and their colors matched those that Marissa Moody had recalled seeing on the rolled-up Oriental rug.

The jury was shown a videotape of a deposition given by Arthur March, who had been arrested in January and taken a plea deal on the murder-conspiracy charges of a reduced sentence in exchange for offering evidence against his son. He said he had thought about killing the Levines since at least 2002: "They were liars, they were political animals who used her position with the Jewish mafia and his position with the Democratic Party to get what they wanted," which led the Levines to laugh mildly as they watched. He did not have a high opinion of their daughter, either, calling her "a typical ... Jewish-American princess ... Anything she wanted, if she needed it, she went to her father. To my knowledge, Perry was there for show purposes."

He did, however, further confirm that Perry had killed her that night, and said that he had disposed of the computer's hard drive in the woods at Perry's behest. After that, he offered the first details about what had been done with the body. A few weeks after the murder, he said, Perry had taken him one night to a wooded area on the north edge of the city, a 100-acre (40 ha) lot whose purchaser he had recently represented, and given him directions to where he had hidden the body in a leaf bag, then driven off. Arthur found it, picked it up, saying it weighed about 50–60 pounds (23–27 kg). After he brought it back to Perry's car, the two drove north to Bowling Green, Kentucky, where they found a motel. While Perry slept, Arthur took his Jeep and drove to the other side of the city. As the dawn broke, he abandoned his original plan to throw it in a creek, since none were deep enough, and instead buried the bag, Janet's clothes, and her skeletal remains within a large pile of brush he found. He was unable to find the location of the pile when prosecutors took him to Bowling Green again after his plea deal, but they nevertheless found his account credible.

Perry's defense case-in-chief consisted primarily of attacking King's credibility. Several of the Davidson County jail's correctional officers testified that he had complained about ghosts in his cell and water that ran continuously due to a plumbing problem, and had possibly threatened Perry with physical harm to get extra food from him. His last evidence was a videotape of an interview Samson March had given to a television station in 2000, in which he recalled that his mother had gone to his room and kissed him goodbye as she left, and then he had seen her waving to him as she drove away.

The video drew three rebuttal witnesses from the prosecution. Samson's kindergarten teacher at University School of Nashville testified that he had been downcast when he started classes on August 27, despite it being both his birthday and the first day of school. When she asked why, he said he was sad because his mother had left two weeks ago and he hadn't had a chance to say goodbye. A Chicago lawyer who was appointed the children's guardian ad litem in the custody case there said Samson told her that on the night his mother disappeared, he heard his parents arguing from his bedroom, and when he woke up, his mother was gone. Carolyn Levine was recalled and testified that not only had the boy never told her about his mother driving away, he would not have been able to see anything but a vehicle's roof from his bedroom window.

=== Conviction and sentence ===
The trial lasted a week. On August 17, ten years and two days after prosecutors alleged Perry murdered Janet, the jury reached a verdict after ten hours of deliberations. They found him guilty on all charges. The Levines expressed their gratitude to the MNPD and prosecutors; Perry's lawyers said they would appeal since the overall case was weak although they admitted the taped conversations between Arthur, Perry and Farris had been very strong evidence.

Three weeks later, he was sentenced on all the crimes he had been convicted of that year. Neither Perry nor the Levines made any statement at the hearing, although Mark Levine had one read into the record. Perry received a total of 56 years in prison. A five-year sentence for the theft would run concurrently with 24 years for the murder conspiracy, after which would be consecutive sentences of 25 years for second-degree murder, two years for abuse of a corpse and five years for tampering with evidence.

On the same day Perry was convicted, his father was sentenced. At the time he made his plea agreement, his lawyers and the federal prosecutor had agreed that he would serve 18 months with a longer period of supervised release afterwards. However, the judge rejected that agreement in favor of a five-year sentence. Three months later, on December 21, Arthur died at the federal prison medical center in Fort Worth, Texas.

== Appeals ==
As they had said they would, Perry and his lawyers appealed his conviction to the Tennessee Court of Criminal Appeals (TCCA). Their chief claim of error was that the trial court should have suppressed his conversation with Postiglione on the plane from Los Angeles and the taped conversations between himself and Farris, and his father and Farris. All of them, Perry argued, were obtained in violation of his Fifth and Sixth Amendment rights against compelled self-incrimination and to the assistance of counsel, since at those times he was in police custody after his arrest and indictment.

He claimed his conversation with Postiglione had been coerced and his statements not made freely. Nor had he properly waived his right to counsel at that point. And even if he had, he added, the conversations were largely settlement negotiations and thus inadmissible under Tennessee's rules of evidence.

His conversations with Farris had mostly, Perry conceded, concerned his attempt to have the Levines murdered, a crime for which he had not been charged at that point, and so those discussions were admissible in the trial on that charge. But statements he had made concerning Janet's murder during those discussions should not have been as they were made without counsel present. The precedents the trial court had relied on in allowing them into evidence had, Perry noted, been abrogated by United States v. Bender, a later decision by the same federal First Circuit Court of Appeals that had decided those precedents. He also argued they served primarily to impeach his character without any relevance to the charged offense.

In addition to the constitutional issues, Perry also claimed that the letters he wrote to the Bass Berry paralegal, her testimony, and the draft of his unpublished novel were prejudicial to him to an extent that far outweighed their relevance to the case. Further, he said the tolling of the statute of limitations on the lesser charges associated with Janet's murder during the time after he left the state interfered with his freedom of movement, and denied him equal protection of the laws since it only applied to nonresidents. Lastly, he said, even if none of the trial court's errors were individually enough to justify overturning the conviction, the cumulative effect was sufficiently prejudicial.

=== State appeal ===
The TCCA heard the case in 2010. Early the next year it issued its opinion upholding the conviction. Judge Robert Woodall wrote for a unanimous panel of three.

On the issue of Perry's conversation with Postiglione, the court found that the facts of the conversation defeated any constitutional claims. The detective had clearly told Perry that he was under no obligation to say anything to him about the crime; Perry had responded that he was an attorney and knew his rights. Also in evidence was Perry's early deposition in the visitation case where he had invoked his Fifth Amendment right against self-incrimination more than a dozen times, showing the appeals court that he knew how to do so should he have wished to. In fact, the court noted, Perry himself had characterized it as "two guys having a cordial conversation." Nor was it barred from admission under the evidentiary rule he cited since that had been intended to apply only to settlement discussions of civil actions.

The court found that Perry's conversations with Farris were relevant as they went to the identity of whoever might be responsible for Janet's murder. After a lengthy analysis of various federal and state precedents where police had obtained incriminating statements from jailed defendants plotting with undercover investigators or informants to commit crimes that would improve their evidentiary position in cases pending against them, Woodall reiterated the U.S. Supreme Court's holding in McNeil v. Wisconsin that the Sixth Amendment right to counsel is offense-specific and could not be assumed to apply to statements Perry made about Janet's fate while conspiring with Farris since the two crimes were not closely related enough.

Furthermore, Perry's case could be distinguished from those he had cited since in his case there was no evidence the government had initiated the investigation as a pretext to capture incriminating statements about the charge he had been jailed to await trial for. And even if his Fifth and Sixth Amendment rights had been violated by the conversation with Postiglione and the tapes from the murder plot, the TCCA noted last, they made up a small portion of the overall prosecution case. If they had been suppressed, a reasonable jury could still have convicted Perry based on the overwhelming circumstantial evidence, rendering their inclusion harmless error.

Moving on to the non-constitutional arguments, the court was similarly unpersuaded. The letters to the Bass Berry paralegal, and her testimony, spoke directly to Perry's possible motive in committing the crime, especially since the defense had not objected to the introduction of his 1996 deposition where he had said the payments were not much of an issue between him and Janet. Other than two or three sentences, Woodall added, the letters were not that sexually explicit. As for the novel manuscript, the defense had not objected to its introduction at trial and therefore had waived its right to a consideration of the issue on appeal.

The court also rejected Perry's claims on the tolling issue. The case he had cited as a precedent, where the Tennessee Supreme Court had quashed a felony nonsupport indictment of a Texas man who had never visited, much less lived in, Tennessee, was inapposite since unlike that man, Perry had committed his crime in Tennessee and then left the state. The U.S. Supreme Court's Jones v. Helms, in fact, had upheld tolling in a similar non-support case where the defendant had left his original state of residence, just as Perry had. More generally, the state's compelling interest in prosecuting crimes allows the encumbrance of the right to travel created by the tolling; since it applied to anyone who committed crimes in Tennessee and then left the state regardless of whether they lived in Tennessee or not it met the equal protection burden. Nor had Perry shown any evidence that it was enforced against him prejudicially.

Since the court had ruled against Perry on every issue he raised, it did not feel there had been any cumulative effect. In July 2011 it denied him permission to appeal the case to the Tennessee Supreme Court.

=== Federal habeas petition ===
With no further possibility of appeal in state court, Perry turned to the federal courts. From his cell at the Northeast Correctional Complex outside Mountain City, he handwrote a habeas corpus petition and filed it with the United States District Court for the Eastern District of Tennessee in Knoxville. It was soon transferred to the Middle District, which covers Nashville, as the more appropriate venue.

Kevin H. Sharp, a newly appointed judge, heard the case. Perry added some challenges to his conspiracy conviction to his arguments at state appeal:

- The conspiracy indictment accused Perry and Arthur of plotting to have the Levines killed, but the facts introduced at that trial focused on Perry's conspiracy with a fellow inmate acting as a government agent, which cannot lead to a conspiracy conviction;
- the jury instructions at that trial also allowed the jury to convict Perry of conspiring with a government agent largely due to the actions of Arthur and Farris;
- that a mistrial should have been declared when Lawrence Levine accused Perry of previous uncharged offenses during his testimony;
- and lastly that the cumulative effect of the errors above denied him a fair trial.

In another petition related to his murder conviction, he focused on the constitutional issues around his conversation on the plane with Postiglione and the statements made during the murder plot that related to Janet's death. He argued that the TCCA erred in assuming he had initiated the conversation on the plane and that the situation of having been under arrest and transported thousands of miles by air was inherently coercive.

In June 2013, Sharp denied both petitions, setting down his reasoning in two lengthy memorandum opinions that extensively quoted the TCCA's summary of the trial. While March had indeed exhausted his state remedies, Sharp said, he was constrained by the provisions of the Antiterrorism and Effective Death Penalty Act of 1996 (AEDPA) in his review. Under its terms, he could only overturn a state court's findings if it had applied federal law in an unreasonable or clearly mistaken way.

==== Conspiracy case ====
Sharp reiterated the TCCA's finding that the indictment alleged that Perry and Arthur conspired with each other, and that the identity of any actual killer was not something the state needed to prove as part of its case. This finding, he said, was not inconsistent with any federal law or precedent, since the Supreme Court has never required that states must indict someone facing felony charges, or that a factual variance between the indictment and the case presented was necessarily fatal to a conviction.

During his state appeal, Perry had not adequately raised the issue of the jury instructions, Sharp wrote, so he was not allowed to raise them in his habeas petition. But even if he were, the judge continued, he would not have found the issue sufficient to decide in Perry's favor. "[T]he jury instructions may not have been a model of clarity and might well have served to confuse the jury," Sharp wrote, "[but] the state court's contrary determination rested largely on questions of state law defining the elements of the offenses with which March was charged, which this Court is not in a position to second-guess."

Likewise, Perry had not raised the issue of the possible mistrial in state court in a sufficient manner to preserve it for appeal, so that claim was denied as well. Again, Sharp took the time to explain why he would likely have denied it had he been able to consider it on the merits. Perry had not shown the "manifest necessity" for a mistrial required under state law, and federal law in any case did not consider a denial of a mistrial to automatically rise to the level of a constitutional violation.

Lastly, following the TCCA, Sharp found that since there had been no error the law allowed him to consider, there could be no cumulative error. He also denied Perry a certificate of appealability, but reminded him that he could still get one from the Sixth Circuit Court of Appeals, which has appellate jurisdiction over the federal courts of Tennessee.

==== Murder case ====
The next day, Sharp issued another lengthy ruling upholding the murder conviction. The trial record, which he was bound to accept, clearly established that Perry initiated his conversation with Postiglione, and the judge was unaware of any case law that suggested being under arrest and transported to await trial was inherently coercive. There was thus no Fifth Amendment violation.

However, he agreed with Perry that his right to counsel had been violated, as he had never been given a full Miranda warning before the conversation took place, and it was not enough for the TCCA to assume that Perry was fully aware of his rights by virtue of having been at one time a practicing attorney. "Anyone who watches crime shows on television is likely to be just as aware as March of his right to counsel," Sharp wrote, "but this Court is unaware of any exception to the requirement that a defendant be given a Miranda warning before waiving his right to counsel that applies only to lawyers or those who have watched more than their fair share of Law & Order."

Nor was Sharp willing to follow the TCCA in finding no Sixth Amendment violation on the grounds that Perry had initiated the conversation or that Postiglione said he did not consider it a formal interrogation. The state appellate court, he explained, followed the correct precedents but applied them unreasonably. He distinguished those cases from Perry's by observing that in all of them, the defendants had been properly advised of their Miranda rights. However, as the TCCA had concluded, this was harmless error since it was just one of many convincing pieces of evidence in the record.

On the matter of the jailhouse conversations, Sharp discussed the precedents relied on by the TCCA at length. While he felt that United States v. Bender, which Perry had argued controlled, was more apposite to the facts of Perry's case than the TCCA court had believed, he ultimately agreed with its conclusion that Perry's right to counsel had not been violated. The TCCA's reading of the relevant Supreme Court precedents, Massiah v. United States and Maine v. Moulton, both of which concerned attempts by the government to use undercover agents or informants to elicit incriminating information from an unknowing defendant about a charged offense, was different from how it had been applied in the other case, but not unreasonably so. And again, the jailhouse conversations were only one of many pieces of evidence.

Again, Sharp found no evidence of cumulative error because he had only found one error, and it was harmless. In denying the petition, however, he granted a certificate of appealability due to the Sixth Amendment violation he had found. Perry filed an appeal before the end of the year.

=== Federal appeal ===
Three circuit judges—Eric L. Clay, Damon Keith and David McKeague—were empaneled to hear the case. In June 2014, based on a review of the record and the previous decisions, they reached their own decision upholding the district court.

Keith wrote for the panel, which considered just the Sixth Amendment questions around the conversation with Postiglione and the jailhouse conversations. On the first, the judges engaged in no analysis of their own, simply assuming for the sake of argument that, as Sharp had found, Perry's right to counsel had been violated. However, they joined Sharp and the TCCA in finding the error harmless due to the weight of the other evidence.

The panel had more to say about the jailhouse conversations. Though it ultimately agreed with the district court and the TCCA that their inclusion was harmless error due to the extensive other evidence, it departed from previous reviews in finding that the use of statements incriminating Perry in Janet's murder in recorded conversations between him and Farris at trial was a violation of his Sixth Amendment right to counsel.

The TCCA, and the district court, had been mistaken in applying McNeil and cases that followed it to Perry's case, Keith wrote. Rather, Massiah and Moulton, since they both involved attempts to surreptitiously elicit incriminating statements from defendants already charged, were controlling. And Bender offered the closest set of facts to Perry's case.

"It was clear that questioning March about the plot to murder government witnesses would result in March making incriminating statements as to the murder charge, for which he was already represented" Keith wrote. "March had a right to counsel present as a medium if the government planned on using the testimony in his murder case ... we conclude that using his statements to his original murder case was a violation of his Sixth Amendment right to counsel."

This inability to disentangle an investigation into a proposed, uncharged future crime from the investigation into one already charged had led the First Circuit to uphold the district court's decision to suppress that sort of evidence from the defendant's pending trial in Bender. However, the Supreme Court had never considered a case with those facts, and under the AEDPA the Sixth Circuit could therefore not disturb the finding that Perry's rights were not violated.

Perry had introduced one more possible ground for appeal, which the panel considered in a footnote. Arthur had testified in his video deposition that the bag with Janet's skeletal remains had weighed, in his estimate, 50–60 pounds (23–27 kg), while the state's expert had said that the bones would have weighed 15 pounds (6.8 kg) at most. Perry said this violated the "physical facts rule" under which testimony that contradicts scientific facts or natural principles can be disregarded by a jury.

Since Perry had not objected to that statement's inclusion at trial, the court could review it for plain error only. Keith noted that the rug Marissa Moody saw was never otherwise accounted for beyond the fiber evidence, and that Arthur had also testified to there being other objects in the leaf bag besides the bones. Thus, he said, the jury could have reasonably accounted for the discrepancy by assuming that there might have been other objects in the bag.

=== Supreme Court certiorari petition ===
Perry had one more possible appeal left. Later that year, he told Nashville's WTVF that he was planning to file a certiorari petition with the Supreme Court. "I'm innocent and I'm hopeful that the system will work the way it's supposed to," he said. In June 2015, however, the Supreme Court denied the petition without comment, exhausting Perry's appeals.

== Aftermath ==
All of the civil court actions were eventually disposed. Before Perry's murder trial had even begun, the Tennessee Court of Appeals upheld the 2005 juvenile court decision giving the Levines temporary custody of the children. The probate action ended with the court assessing a $220,000 judgement against Perry's brother and sister for dividing possessions of Janet's that Perry had taken with him to Chicago amongst themselves after he moved to Mexico; that was upheld on appeal the following year with permission to appeal further denied in 2008. Later in 2008, the TCCA upheld Perry's theft conviction, but reduced his sentence for the crime to three years since it agreed with him that his Sixth Amendment rights had been violated when the sentence was enhanced based on a fact not determined by the jury.

Perry is currently serving his sentence at Northeast Correctional Complex outside Mountain City. He told the media he volunteers his time in the prison's law library, helping other inmates with their appeals. He will not be eligible for parole until 2035.

Neither the exhaustion of his criminal appeals nor his disbarment has deterred Perry's appetite for litigation. In 2017 he filed, pro se, a 200-page suit in Middle District federal court against the TDC and Aramark, its food provider, alleging religious discrimination. He claimed the kosher meals he receives are neither nutritious nor properly prepared, and are deliberately done so in an effort to get him to abandon a kosher diet due to past issues with other inmates falsely claiming to be Jewish and thus driving food costs up.

== Legacy ==
After Perry had been convicted, Lawrence and Mark Levine drafted changes to Tennessee law to remedy what they saw as its shortcomings, based on their experience fighting Perry in family court. They expanded grandparent visitation rights, and allowed judges to terminate custody of parents found criminally or civilly liable for the death of the other parent. After they were introduced into the Tennessee legislature, they were passed quickly by both houses, with unanimous support. Mark would later point to the experience when he successfully ran for a seat in Virginia's House of Delegates in 2015.

An art gallery at Nashville's Gordon Jewish Community Center was named for Janet as a memorial.

Her case is featured on the Season 2, Episode 3, titled "High Society Sins", from the show, Deadly Sins.

== See also ==
- Crime in Tennessee
- List of murder convictions without a body
- List of solved missing person cases
- Uxoricide
