= Erroll Southers =

American former law enforcement agent

Erroll G. Southers is an American expert in transportation security and counterterrorism. He is the author of Inside the Castle Walls: An American Journey Through Espionage, Counterterrorism and Government (2026), winner of the 2026 Independent Author Award in African American non-fiction. He is also the author of Homegrown Violent Extremism (2013). Southers is the Associate Senior Vice President for Safety & Risk Assurance at the University of Southern California (USC) and a Professor of Practice in National and Homeland Security. He is also managing director for counterterrorism & infrastructure protection at TAL Global Corporation. He previously served as the president of the Los Angeles Board of Police Commissioners, as well as assistant chief of the Los Angeles World Airports (LAWA) police department's office of homeland security and intelligence. He is a former special agent of the Federal Bureau of Investigation and was deputy director of homeland security under California governor Arnold Schwarzenegger. In 2009 he was nominated by President Barack Obama to become head of the Transportation Security Administration (TSA), but Southers withdrew.

== Education and early academic career ==
Southers earned a Bachelor of Arts degree at Brown University in 1978, a Master of Public Administration, at University of Southern California in 1998 and a doctorate in policy, planning and development, from the USC Price School of Public Policy, in 2013. Southers' dissertation, "Homegrown Violent Extremism: Designing a Community-Based Model to Reduce the Risk of Recruitment and Radicalization," explored the "morality, leadership and group behavioral constructs capable of supporting a terrorism resistant community model." He is a senior fellow of the UCLA School of Public Affairs and a visiting fellow of the International Institute of Counter-Terrorism in Herzliya, Israel.

== Police career ==
Southers began his law enforcement career at the Santa Monica Police Department and served as a faculty member of the Rio Hondo police academy. During his four years in the FBI, Southers was assigned to counterterrorism, foreign counterintelligence and was a member of the bureau's SWAT Team. He was the deputy director for critical infrastructure protection of the California Office of Homeland Security (2004–2006), appointed by Schwarzenegger. He provided oversight of critical infrastructure protection policy, national pilot programs such as Protected Critical Infrastructure Information (PCII) and served as a member of the National Infrastructure Protection Plan (NIPP) working group, responsible for developing the NIPP.

In 2006, Southers was named associate director of special programs for CREATE, where he developed the university's executive program in counter-terrorism and serves as an adjunct professor of homeland security and public policy in the USC Price School of Public Policy. Recognized as one of the university's counter-terrorism experts, he lectures at the joint chiefs of staff level IV antiterrorism seminars and has testified before the full congressional committee on homeland security. In 2007, he was appointed chief of intelligence and counter-terrorism for the Los Angeles World Airports (LAWA) police department, the nation's largest aviation law enforcement agency.

Southers' interdisciplinary methodology has engaged CREATE and LAWA in pilot projects involving the testing of peroxide-based explosives detection methodologies and assistant randomized motoring over routes, designed to detect and deter terrorist pre-attack operations. His international experience includes counterterrorism study and lectures in Canada, Great Britain, Israel and China, where he was invited to assess the proposed terrorism countermeasures for the 2008 Beijing Olympics.

== Nomination ==
President Obama nominated Southers in September 2009, but the Senate recessed at the end of 2009, without having taken up the nomination. One reason for the delay was a hold placed on the nomination by Republican senator Jim DeMint, who opposed the unionization of TSA employees. DeMint cited Southers' possible support of the unionization of the TSA, which is forbidden in TSA's founding legislation, and inconsistencies in Southers' account of running background checks for personal reasons in the 1980s. After the attempted bombing of Northwest Airlines Flight 253, in December 2009, delays were criticized by Marshall McClain, the president of the Los Angeles Airport Police peace officers' association, stating: "Friday's terrorist attack on U.S. aviation makes it all the more imperative that there be no further delays in filling this crucial position."

On December 30, 2009, Senate Majority Leader Harry Reid announced he would file for cloture on the Southers nomination, once the Senate returned from the December recess. Given the Democratic supermajority in the Senate at the time of the nomination, it was expected that Southers would be confirmed sometime in January 2010.

During the confirmation process, Southers offered an inconsistent account of database searches for criminal records on his estranged wife's boyfriend in the 1980s, which McClatchy reported in 2010 was with regard to Southers' concern for his infant son's safety. He corrected his testimony in a Nov. 22, 2009, letter to the Senate.

On January 10, 2010, Southers withdrew his nomination, saying in a statement released by the White House, "My nomination has become a lightning rod for those who have chosen to push a political agenda at the risk of the safety and security of the American people."

Commenting on Southers' withdrawal, the former DHS Undersecretary for Border and Transportation Security Asa Hutchinson wrote, "This is an example of someone getting caught in Washington's political cross fires over something [unionization of TSA employees] that is candidly out of his control."
