= Max Abrahms =

American political scientist

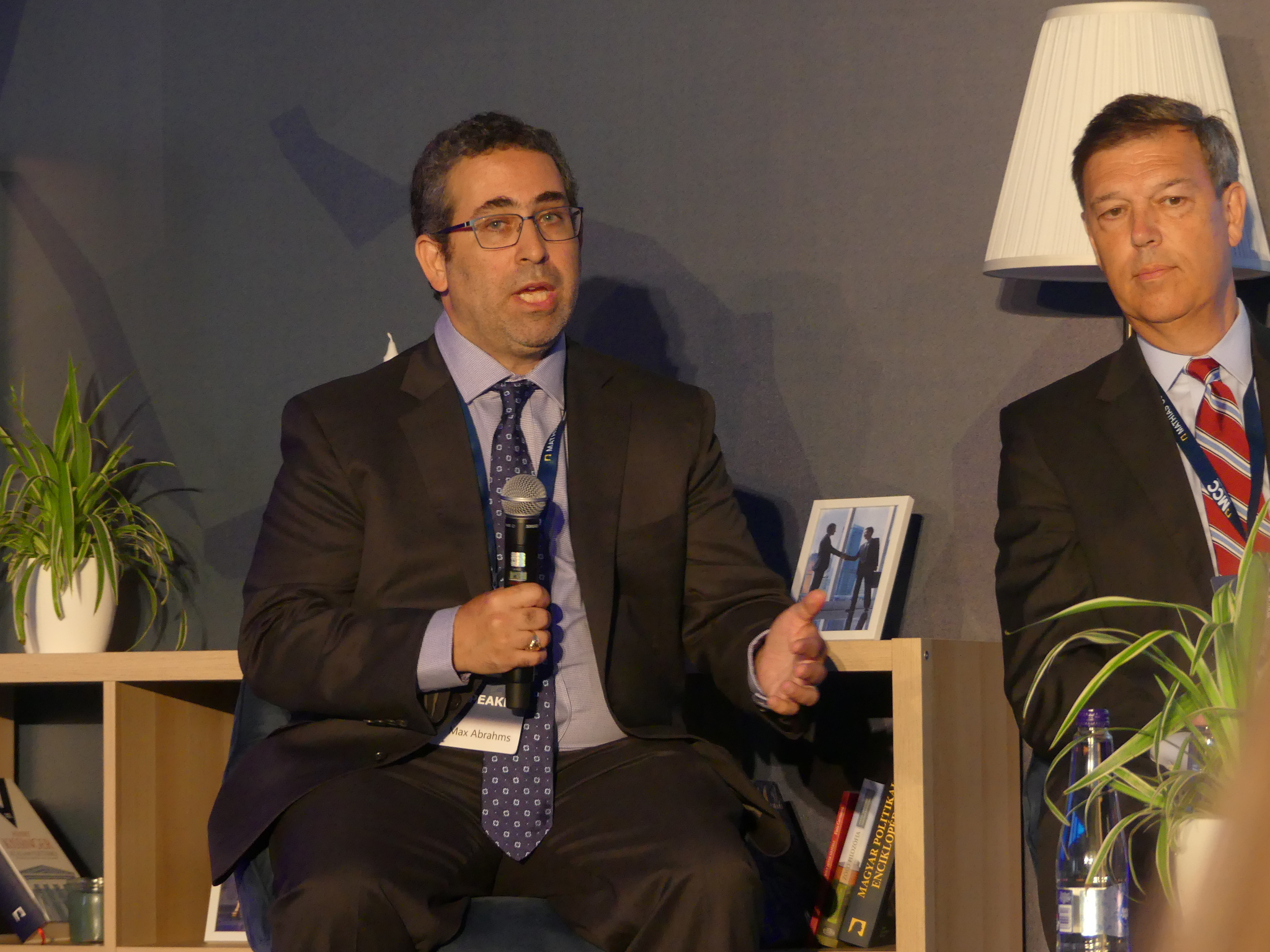
Max Abrahms speaking at the Mathias Corvinus Collegium Peace Conference in June 2023

Max Abrahms (born 1977) is an American political scientist specializing in international security. He specializes in the areas of terrorism, U.S. foreign policy, great power competition, war, and the international relations of the Middle East. He is among the top-cited scholars on Google Scholar in the field of "terrorism studies." He is currently an associate professor at Northeastern University in Boston.

He has held fellowships and other research positions with the Center for International Security and Cooperation at Stanford University, the Dickey Center for International Understanding at Dartmouth College, the Department of Political Science at Johns Hopkins University, the Center for Cyber and Homeland Security at George Washington University, the Moshe Dayan Center at Tel Aviv University, the Human Security Centre in London, the Washington Institute for Near East Policy, Institute for Peace and Diplomacy, Center for the Study of Terrorism in Rome, the Belfer Center at Harvard University, and the Council on Foreign Relations and consults with government agencies about the contemporary extremism landscape.

He regularly writes about international security issues for the media and has fielded interviews from the Atlantic, BBC, CNN, Newsweek, the New York Times, USA Today, Voice of America, and the Washington Post, among others.

== Selected bibliography ==
=== Books ===
- Rules for Rebels: The Science of Victory in Militant History. Oxford University Press. 2018. ISBN 9780192539441.

=== Articles and Book Chapters ===
- With Katchanovski, Ivan (2024). "Far-Right Political Violence in Ukraine". Perspectives on Terrorism. 18 (3): 90–113. JSTOR stable/10.2307/27336025.
- "Dying to bankrupt: the effect of suicide terrorism on foreign direct investment". Dynamics of Asymmetric Conflict. 18 (3): 1–21. doi:10.1080/17467586.2024.2406766.
- With Mroszczyk, Joseph (February 24, 2022), "The Strategic Model of Terrorism", Oxford Research Encyclopedia of International Studies, Oxford: Oxford University Press, doi:10.1093/acrefore/9780190846626.013.697
- With Dau, Luis Alfonso; Moore, Elizabeth M. (2023). "Should I stay or should I go now? Understanding terrorism as a driver of institutional escapism". International Business Review. 32 (4). doi:10.1016/j.ibusrev.2023.102120.
- With Ward, Matthew; Kennedy, Ryan (2018). "Explaining Civilian Attacks: Terrorist Networks, Principal-Agent Problems and Target Selection". Perspectives on Terrorism. 12 (1): 23–45. JSTOR stable/26343744.
- With Mierau, Jochen (September 3, 2017). "Leadership Matters: The Effects of Targeted Killings on Militant Group Tactics". Terrorism and Political Violence. 29 (5): 830–851. doi:10.1080/09546553.2015.1069671. hdl:11370/9be10002-0682-4c29-b01b-e25a4e5f3e4d. ISSN 0954-6553. S2CID 146507596.
- With Conrad, Justin (2017). "The Strategic Logic of Credit Claiming: A New Theory for Anonymous Terrorist Attacks" (PDF). Security Studies. 26 (2): 279–304. doi:10.1080/09636412.2017.1280304.
- With Beauchamp, Nicholas; Mroszczyk, Joseph (2016). "What Terrorist Leaders Want: A Content Analysis of Terrorist Propaganda Videos". Studies in Conflict & Terrorism. 40 (11): 899–916. doi:10.1080/1057610X.2016.1248666.
- With Gottfried, Matthews S. "Abrahms, M., & , M. S. (2014). Does Terrorism Pay? An Empirical Analysis". Terrorism and Political Violence. 28 (1): 72–89. doi:10.1080/09546553.2013.879057.
- "What Terrorists Really Want: Terrorist Motives and Counterterrorism Strategy". International Security. 32 (4): 78–105. 2008. doi:10.1162/isec.2008.32.4.78. ISSN 1531-4804. JSTOR 30129792. S2CID 57561190.
- "Why Terrorism Does Not Work". International Security. 31 (2): 42–78. 2006. doi:10.1162/isec.2006.31.2.42.
- "Are Terrorists Really Rational? The Palestinian Example". Orbis. Foreign Policy Research Institute: 533–549. 2004.
