= Nashville Waffle House shooting =

2018 mass shooting in Tennessee, U.S.

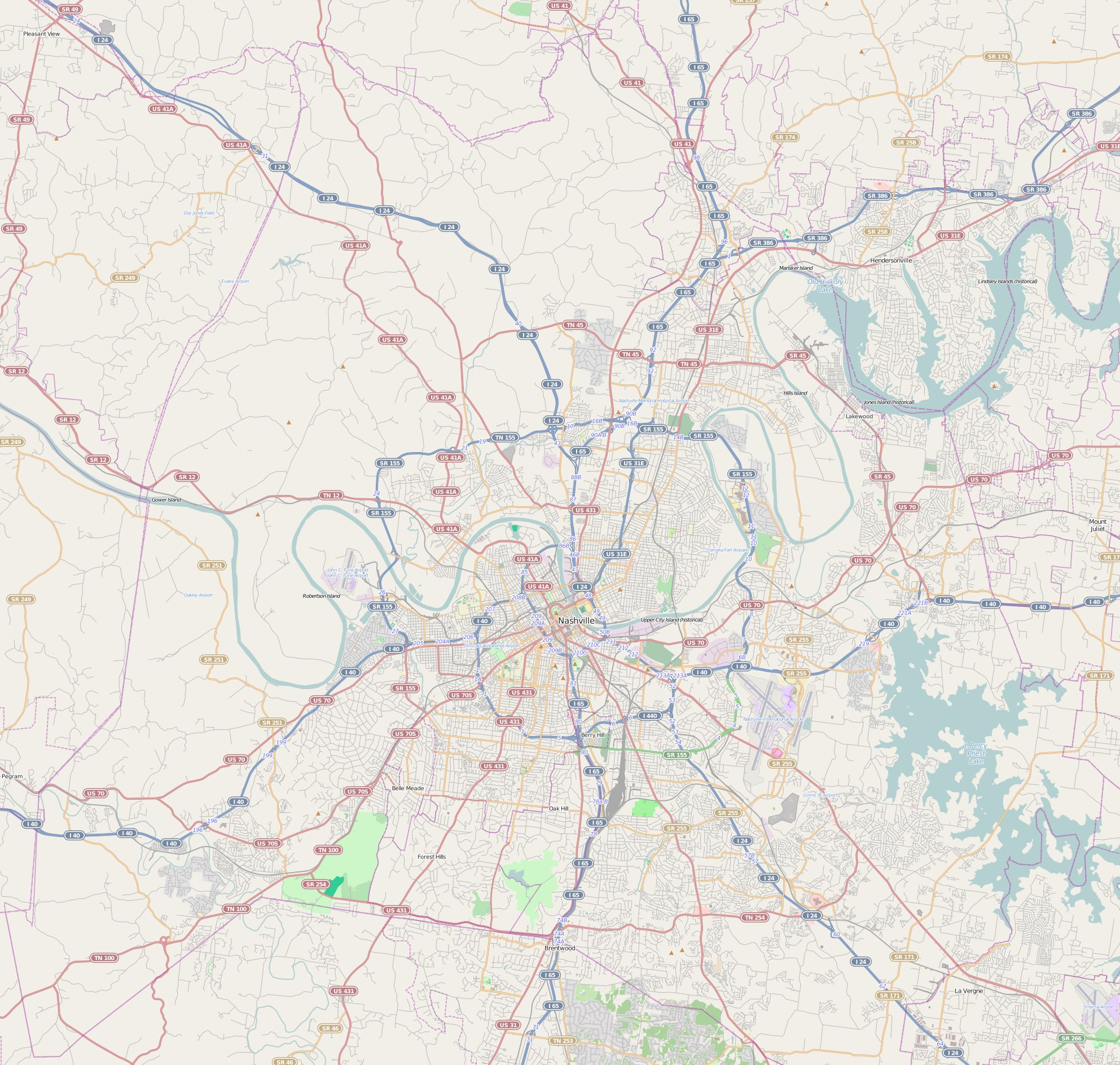
- Shooting location (Nashville) Shooting location (Tennessee) Shooting location (the United States)
- Location: 36°03′02″N 86°36′56″W; Waffle House; 3571 Murfreesboro Pike, Antioch, Nashville, Tennessee, US
- Date: April 22, 2018; 3:25 a.m. (CDT)
- Attack type: Mass shooting, mass murder
- Weapon: Bushmaster XM-15 semi-automatic rifle
- Deaths: 4
- Injuries: 4 (2 by gunfire)
- Perpetrator: Travis Jeffrey Reinking
- Defender: James Shaw Jr.
- Motive: Schizophrenia
- Verdict: Guilty on all counts
- Convictions: Premeditated first-degree murder (4 counts); Attempted first-degree murder (6 counts); Possessing a firearm during the commission of a dangerous felony (4 counts)
- Sentence: Life imprisonment without the possibility of parole

On April 22, 2018, a mass shooting occurred at a Waffle House restaurant in the Antioch neighborhood of Nashville, Tennessee, United States, when 29-year-old Travis Jeffrey Reinking opened fire and fatally shot four people and injured two others with a Bushmaster manufactured AR-15–style rifle. Another two people were injured by broken glass. Reinking was rushed by an unarmed customer, James Shaw Jr., who wrestled the rifle away and stopped the shooting spree. Reinking was captured on April 23, ending a 34-hour manhunt.

Due to severe schizophrenia, Reinking was initially found incompetent to stand trial and committed to a mental hospital for treatment. Later that decision was changed and Reinking was put on trial for four counts of first degree premeditated murder on January 31, 2022. He was convicted of the charges on February 4, 2022.

== Perpetrator ==
Travis Reinking
- 2018 mugshot.
- Born: Travis Jeffrey Reinking; February 1, 1989 (age 37); Morton, Illinois, U.S.
- Status: Incarcerated
- Penalty: Life imprisonment without parole

Details
- Date: April 22, 2018
- Country: United States
- Location: Nashville, Tennessee
- Killed: 4
- Injured: 4 (2 by gunfire)
- Date apprehended: April 23, 2018
- Imprisoned at: Morgan County Correctional Complex

Travis Reinking was a construction worker from Morton, Illinois, near Peoria. He had a history of erratic conduct, paranoia and delusions, and was particularly obsessed with pop singer Taylor Swift. At one point, he confused his coworkers by saying that he was gay while also claiming that he had plans to marry Taylor Swift. In May 2016, sheriff's deputies in Tazewell County responded to a call from Reinking's parents in the parking lot of a drugstore, where a paramedic said Reinking had delusions that Swift was personally stalking him and hacking his phone and bank accounts. The report noted: "Travis is hostile toward police and does not recognize police authority. Travis also possesses several firearms."

In 2017, Reinking lived in an apartment above his father's crane rental business in Tremont, Illinois. He worked as a crane operator for another company, but quit his job in March 2017 because he believed police were following him, and that his "last chance" to marry Taylor Swift was soon approaching. In June 2017, an employee of his father's business called police, saying Reinking had come downstairs carrying a rifle, wearing a pink dress, and using an expletive before tossing the rifle in his trunk and leaving the building. On another occasion around the same time, a public pool director called police to report Reinking had come to the pool in a "pink women's housecoat" and then exposed himself to lifeguards.

In July 2017, the U.S. Secret Service arrested Reinking near the White House after he crossed a barrier and refused to leave. The Secret Service said Reinking had said he "wanted to set up a meeting with the president". The report notes he made reference to being a "sovereign citizen" and thus having the right to "inspect the grounds" at the White House. Reinking was charged with unlawful entry (a misdemeanor) and entered into a deferred prosecution agreement in July 2017, in which Reinking performed 32 hours of community service and was ordered to stay away from the White House. In November 2017, the court dismissed the case after Reinking successfully completed the program.

Following Reinking's arrest, Illinois authorities revoked his state firearms authorization and seized four of his weapons (including the AR-15 used in the Nashville shooting, two other rifles (a .30-06 Remington Model 710 & a .22-caliber CZ 452-2EZKM), and a .45-caliber Kimber 1911 semi-automatic handgun). According to the sheriff of Tazewell County, Illinois, Reinking's father, Jeffrey Reinking, who held a valid state authorization card, asked sheriff's deputies if he could keep the guns, and they allowed him to do so after he assured them "he would keep them secure and away from" his son. Reinking's father admitted later that he had reluctantly returned the guns to his son sometime before the shooting when Reinking requested him to do so.

According to a spokesman for the Nashville police, Reinking moved to the Nashville area in the autumn of 2017 and was employed as a crane and construction worker from January 2018 until April 2018. He was fired on April 3, 2018, for claiming that people, including other employees, were "after him". According to police, four days before the Waffle House shooting, Reinking stole a BMW X6 from a Brentwood, Tennessee, dealership; police used the vehicle's built-in GPS to track the car to Reinking's apartment complex and located the keyfob in his apartment.

== Shooting ==
Reinking was partially naked when the shooting occurred, wearing only a green jacket. After sitting in a pickup truck in the parking lot for approximately four minutes, he came out holding an AR-15-style rifle and fatally shot two people outside the Waffle House. He went inside the restaurant and continued to fire, killing a third person and fatally injuring a fourth, who died at the Vanderbilt University Medical Center, with four others treated for related injuries. One customer, 29-year-old James Shaw Jr., who suffered a bullet graze wound to his elbow, hid near the restaurant's bathrooms. When Shaw saw Reinking point the rifle down, either to reload or fix a jam, he lunged at the gunman and wrestled the weapon away from him before tossing it over the counter, sustaining second-degree burns from grabbing the hot rifle barrel. After the two briefly scuffled, Reinking fled on foot, totally nude after having abandoned his jacket.

Four people were killed in the attack: Joe Perez Jr., 20, Taurean Sanderlin, 29, Akilah Dasilva, 23, and DeEbony Groves, 21.

Reinking committed the attack after becoming convinced that the people inside the Waffle House restaurant were Central Intelligence Agency agents. He discharged his rifle a total of 30 times during the attack, consisting of 15 shots outside and 15 shots inside; and his jacket contained 60 rounds of live ammunition that had not been used.

== Arrest ==
Reinking went missing, leaving no notes behind. A manhunt for him ensued, with police warning the public that he was potentially armed with two other weapons. The Tennessee Bureau of Investigation added him to its "most wanted" list and offered a reward for information leading to his arrest. Reinking was captured the next day, about 34 hours after the shooting, after a construction worker reported him entering a wooded area close to the Waffle House. Police said Reinking was carrying a backpack with a .45-caliber Kimber 1911 handgun and ammunition.

== Legal proceedings ==
Reinking was charged with four counts of criminal homicide, four counts of attempted homicide, and one count of having a firearm while committing a dangerous felony. Forensic psychologists who examined Reinking determined that he suffered from severe schizophrenia, and in August 2018 a judge found Reinking incompetent to stand trial and ordered him committed to a mental hospital for treatment. However, in October 2018 he was found competent to stand trial again. In a January 2020 court appearance, prosecutors announced that they would not seek the death penalty against Reinking. He then faced up to life without parole.

The trial was scheduled for early 2022. The shooter pled not guilty to 16 counts of murder and assault with a deadly weapon. On the day of the trial, the shooter changed his plea from not guilty to not guilty by reason of insanity.

The trial started with jury selection on January 25, 2022. The opening arguments were heard on January 31. Reinking was found guilty on all counts on February 4, 2022, including four counts of premeditated first degree murder. The defense was unsuccessful on their plea of not guilty by reason of insanity. The jury deliberated for nearly five hours before delivering the verdicts. The following day, Reinking was sentenced to life in prison without parole.

Jeffrey Reinking was later charged with "unlawful delivery of a firearm" for returning the weapons to his son. He was found guilty in May 2022, and sentenced to 18 months in prison.

== Aftermath ==
Shortly after the shooting, Nashville Mayor David Briley said, "It's a tragic day for our city anytime people lose their lives at the hands of a gunman." Tennessee Governor Bill Haslam said he was "deeply saddened by the tragic incident in Antioch early this morning, and we mourn the lives taken in this senseless act of violence". Congressman Jim Cooper called for restricting "widespread civilian access to military-grade assault weapons".

Mayor Briley attended church with Shaw on April 22.

While Shaw was described as a hero by numerous people, including Tennessee authorities, he said that he does not think of himself in those terms:

I did that completely out of a selfish act. I was completely doing it just to save myself. Now, me doing that, I did save other people.

— James Shaw Jr., April 23, 2018

By May 7, Shaw had raised $227,000 via GoFundMe for a fund to help the shooting victims. That day, Tennessee State University, Shaw's Alma Mater, set up a scholarship in his name. Tennessee lawmakers passed a joint resolution honoring Shaw's actions. Shaw was interviewed by several media outlets, notably The Ellen DeGeneres Show where he met his idol, NBA basketball star Dwyane Wade. In May 2018, Shaw met with X González, who survived the shooting at Marjory Stoneman Douglas High School and later helped founding Never Again MSD. Together, along with survivors and activists David Hogg, Alex Wind, and Jaclyn Corin among others, the whole group united for a special brunch at a local Denny's in suburban Nashville. The following month, at the 2018 MTV Movie & TV Awards, after Chadwick Boseman won an award for "Best Hero" for his work in Black Panther, he made a statement saying "Receiving an award for playing a superhero is amazing, but it's even greater to acknowledge the heroes that we have in real life"; he then called Shaw up to the stage and gave him the award, saying "This is gonna live at your house". Shaw was presented a Gold Vail Award by Randall L. Stephenson, the Chief Executive Officer of AT&T. In 2018, he received a BET Humanitarian Award.

The families of two victims filed civil actions against Travis Reinking and his family.

== See also ==
- Burnette Chapel shooting
- 2020 Nashville bombing
