= 2020 Nashville bombing =

Vehicle bombing in Tennessee

- CCTV footage of the bombing
- Location: 36°09′50″N 86°46′35″W; 166 Second Avenue North; Nashville, Tennessee, U.S.
- Date: December 25, 2020; 6:30 am CST (12:30 UTC)
- Target: Unknown
- Attack type: Suicide bombing
- Weapon: Car bomb
- Deaths: 1 (the perpetrator)
- Injuries: 8
- Perpetrator: Anthony Quinn Warner
- Motive: Suicide driven by life stressors (suspected)

On December 25 (Christmas Day), 2020, Anthony Quinn Warner detonated a recreational vehicle (RV) bomb in downtown Nashville, Tennessee, United States, killing himself and injuring eight others, damaging dozens of buildings in the surrounding area. The incident took place at 166 Second Avenue North between Church Street and Commerce Street at 6:30 am, adjacent to an AT&T network facility, resulting in days-long communication service outages.

People near the RV heard gunshots, and loudspeakers on the RV warned those in the area to evacuate before the bombing, which was felt miles away. The Federal Bureau of Investigation (FBI) determined that Warner, a Nashville resident, was the bomber and acted alone.

== Bombing ==
The explosion was caused by a car bomb carried in a Thor Motor Coach Chateau RV that had been parked at 1:22 am on December 25, 2020, outside an AT&T network facility on Second Avenue North in downtown Nashville. Four to five hours after the RV arrived, people nearby were awakened by the sound of rapid gunfire in at least three bursts, followed by a computerized female voice broadcasting over a public address system: "All buildings in this area must be evacuated now. If you can hear this message, evacuate now." "Stay clear of this vehicle", "Do not approach this vehicle", and "Your primary objective is to evacuate these buildings now" were also among the messages broadcast from the RV. The broadcast warned that there was a bomb in the vehicle, a 15-minute countdown elapsed, and the speakers switched to snippets from the 1964 song "Downtown" by Petula Clark.

Responding to reports of shots being fired at around 5:30 am, two police officers arrived at the area. They did not hear any shots, but they discovered the parked vehicle and heard the warning. They and three other responding officers subsequently evacuated homes in the area and called in reinforcements, including the hazardous devices unit (bomb squad), while a sixth officer stayed on the street to redirect pedestrians. Two of the officers investigated the RV at one point and observed a camera positioned above its rearview mirror. The vehicle exploded at 6:30 am, while the bomb squad was on its way to the area.

Eight people were treated at hospitals for injuries and later discharged. Three of them sustained non-critical injuries, including two of the officers who had been evacuating residents. The bomber died at the scene; no other fatalities were reported.

== Damage and service outages ==
One video posted to social media appeared to show debris from the bombing landing on a building about two blocks away from the initial location. At least three vehicles burned after the bombing, at least 41 businesses were damaged, and one building across the street from the site of the bombing collapsed. Structural engineers deemed some of the buildings in the area to be safe by December 29.

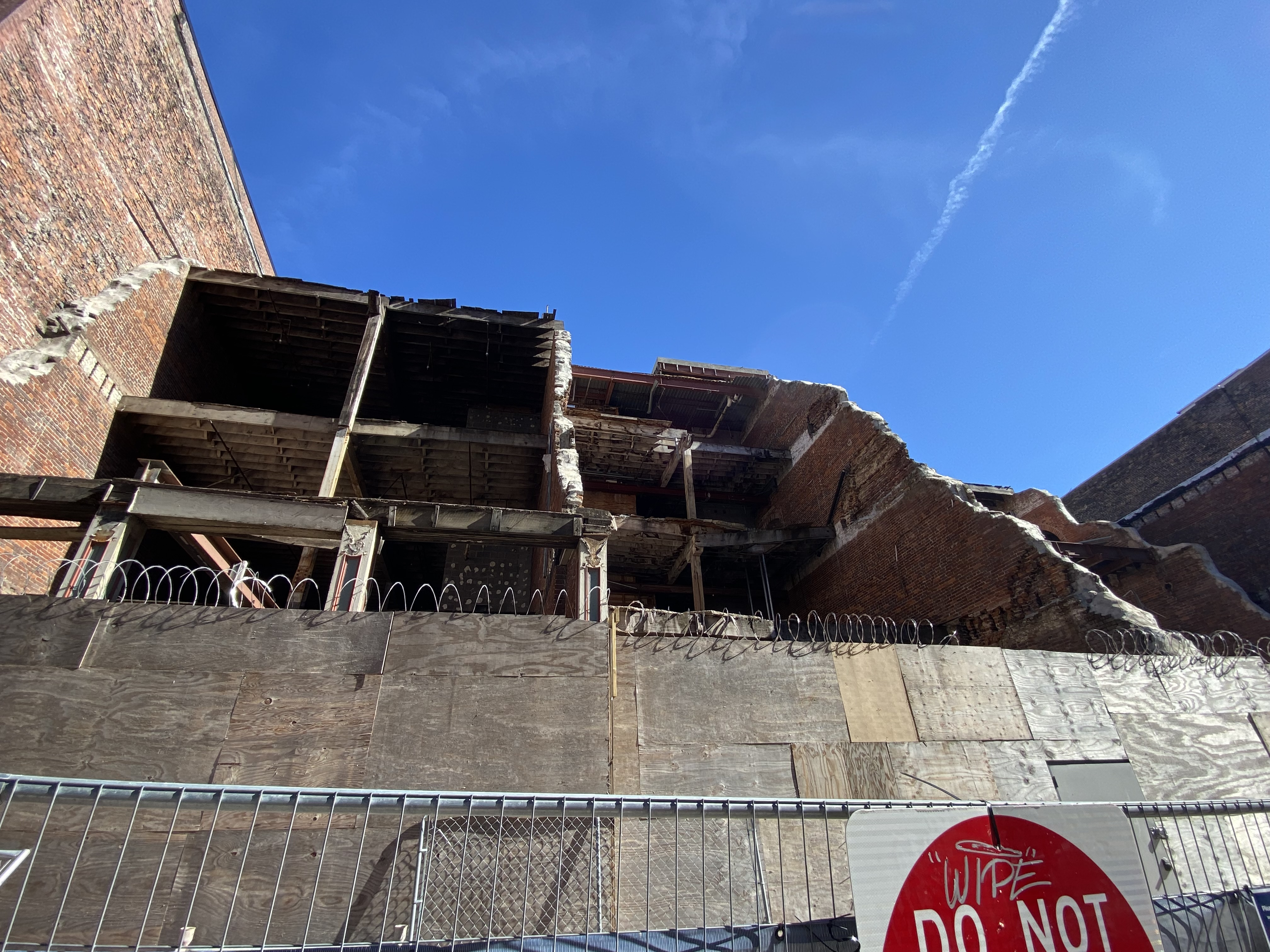
A building section that was destroyed by the bombing, circa 2024

The bombing caused structural and infrastructure damage to a nearby AT&T service facility, which contained a telephone exchange with network equipment in it, resulting in AT&T service outages across the U.S., primarily in Middle Tennessee. Although the facility's backup generators were rendered nonfunctional because of fire and water damage, communication services initially remained uninterrupted as the facility continued to run on battery power. But outages were reported hours after the explosion, with significant service disruptions in the area by noon. Cellular, wireline telephone, internet, and U-verse television services were affected, as were multiple local 911 and non-emergency phone networks in the region, along with Nashville's COVID-19 community hotline and some hospital systems. T-Mobile also reported interruptions to its service. The Memphis Air Route Traffic Control Center experienced communication issues, leading the Federal Aviation Administration (FAA) to ground flights from Nashville International Airport for about an hour.

Outages continued to affect communication services, including Internet, phone, and 911 service, for days after the bombing. Some stores reported switching to a cash-only policy because credit card systems were out of service, and issues with ATMs were reported. AT&T mentioned deploying two mobile cell sites downtown by the next morning, with additional ones deployed throughout Nashville by evening, but gave no specific timeline for full restoration of service, adding that a fire that reignited during the night led to an evacuation of the building. Officials later said a full service restoration could take days.

== Investigation ==
After the bombing, a bomb squad, along with police and federal investigators, arrived at the site to gather evidence and determine what type of explosive was used in the blast. Authorities swept the area and found no additional explosives. Investigators found shell casings in the area but believed they were remnants of unfired ammunition that was destroyed in the explosion. No evidence was found confirming gunshots were fired in the area despite the initial 911 calls.

Human remains found near the site of the explosion matched DNA found on gloves and a hat found in a car owned by Anthony Quinn Warner; a 17-digit vehicle identification number (VIN) reconstructed from the RV's remains was also linked to Warner. Investigators determined the act was a suicide bombing, and Mayor John Cooper called it an attack on infrastructure. Hours of surveillance camera footage indicated that no one other than Warner was involved. Warner's friends and family cooperated with investigators.

The FBI field office in Memphis led the investigation, which also involved the Bureau of Alcohol, Tobacco, Firearms and Explosives, the Tennessee Bureau of Investigation, and local law enforcement agencies. More than 250 FBI personnel from at least seven field offices were involved. A reward for any information about the bombing was announced shortly into the investigation; more than 500 tips and leads were received.

== Perpetrator ==
FBI-published photo of Anthony Quinn Warner

Authorities concluded that 63-year-old Anthony Quinn Warner, a longtime Nashville resident, was the bomber, that his remains were found in the wreckage, and that there was no indication anyone else was involved.

Warner was raised in Nashville's Antioch neighborhood and graduated from Antioch High School in the mid-1970s. His father, Charles Bernard Warner, had been a BellSouth employee in Nashville, which merged with AT&T in 2006. Anthony Warner worked in a series of information technology jobs, including as an independent computer technician contracted with a real estate firm, and had owned a company licensed to produce burglar alarms from 1993 to 1998. He served two years' probation for felony marijuana possession in 1978 but had no other arrests or criminal record. Late in his life, Warner was involved in a family dispute that went to court after he transferred ownership of a family home to himself directly before his brother Steve's death in 2018; the case was dismissed in 2019.

In the weeks before the bombing, Warner quit his job, gave away his car, and executed a quitclaim deed transferring his Nashville duplex home to a Los Angeles woman for $0. He had previously executed a quitclaim deed for a different Nashville house in 2019, transferring his interest in the home to the same woman. Reportedly, Warner had told the woman to whom he gave his car that he had cancer, but it is not known whether that was true. A neighbor said that just before Christmas, Warner had said, "Nashville and the world is never going to forget me." Credit card and receipt records examined by investigators showed that Warner had purchased components that could be used to make bombs.

Authorities initially said that Warner had not attracted the attention of police before the bombing, but it was later revealed that Warner's friend Pamela Perry and her attorney had met with police on August 21, 2019. Perry said that Warner had been making bombs in the RV, and her attorney, who previously represented Warner, said he believed her. Police were unable to make contact with Warner; did not enter Warner's home, yard, or RV; and closed the case as unfounded after an officer observing the home for a few days reported no evidence of bomb-making. After the visit, police forwarded an incident report to and requested a database check from the FBI. Neither the FBI nor the Department of Defense found anything suspicious regarding Warner.

=== Search for motives ===
Investigators searched Warner's home in Nashville after the bombing and seized several items, including a computer and a portable storage device. Google Street View images of his address appeared to show an RV similar to the one used in the bombing. Neighbors of the property told WKRN-TV news that they recognized the RV in the image released by police, saying that it had sat unused for years until Warner began giving it renewed attention about a month before the bombing and that it had disappeared from the property days before the bombing. Neighbors called him reclusive and said they never discussed politics or religion with him.

Warner is also "believed to have spent time hunting for alien lifeforms in a nearby state park." The FBI said that, before the bombing, he "sent materials which espoused his viewpoints to several acquaintances throughout the country." The packages, which the FBI investigated, included writings in which he expresses belief in 9/11 conspiracy theories, moon landing conspiracy theories, and the reptilian conspiracy theory. He also referenced a UFO conspiracy theory according to which space aliens had begun to attack Earth in 2011, which was covered up by the media. He wrote, in part, "Everything is an illusion" and "there is no such thing as death". One of the letter's recipients gave Nashville's WTVF NewsChannel 5 a copy but the outlet decided not to publish it in full, to avoid giving Warner "unnecessary notoriety".

On March 15, 2021, investigators concluded that Warner had acted alone and that the bombing was not connected to terrorism. The bombing was a result of his wanting to end his life, driven by life stresses. He was also fueled by paranoia, conspiracy theories, and the deterioration of his relationships. Warner picked the area to make an impact on the city while also trying to minimize injury. The FBI also said there was no evidence Warner wanted to bring social or political change, or that any person or business was specifically targeted.

In 2025, the lead FBI agent in charge of the investigation told WSMV-TV that Warner chose the location because of personal and professional connections from his youth, and because he had previously done electronic work in the area. The agent told the news organization that "Based on a totality of his writings and things, is he talked a lot about breaking the reincarnation loop", and the bombing may have been motivated by that desire.

== Aftermath ==
=== Response ===
The Nashville Fire Department evacuated the downtown riverfront, and Mayor Cooper issued a curfew for the affected area, which was lifted by December 28. The FAA issued a notice declaring a circular area with a radius of 1 nautical mile (1.15 mi; 1.85 km), centered around the site of the bombing, as "National Defense Airspace", effective that afternoon and lasting five days. The bombing adversely affected many small business owners in the area, who were already dealing with the effects of the COVID-19 pandemic in the state and the aftermath of a tornado that passed through the city in March 2020.

=== Debate over "terrorism" as a term ===
The bombing revived a debate in the U.S. about which acts are labeled as terrorism and why. Former national security prosecutor Alex Little and Nashville city councilor Bob Mendes said the bombing fit the definition of domestic terrorism. Federal investigators avoided using the term in the days after the bombing, with Special Agent in Charge Doug Korneski saying they had not yet established whether Warner had used violence to promote political or social beliefs.

Addressing the terrorism classification debate, a USA Today December 2020 op-ed by Max Abrahms and Joseph Mroszczyk said the bombing had an unprecedented combination of features, each of which could be found in different modern attacks labeled as "terrorist": the intentional minimization of casualties as exhibited by "left-wing groups... targeting... property instead of humans", the perpetrator's suicide as a method "uncommonly employed... by those like Warner who are trying to minimize human suffering", no clear motive or manifesto, and the use of a car bomb, as seen in Islamic terrorist attacks. The Nashville bombing was unique in that it combined all these traits, which the authors said was without precedent. National security expert Erroll Southers told local news outlet WKRN-TV he saw similarities to the Provisional Irish Republican Army, given how Warner warned the public about the bomb and allowed the area to be evacuated before detonation.

=== Subsequent suspicious vehicles ===
On the same day as the bombing, police in Cincinnati, Ohio, shut down streets downtown for a few hours while investigating an RV that appeared to have its engine running outside a federal building, citing the Nashville incident as a reason for the high level of caution. The RV turned out to have a generator mounted to it in operation, which produced a sound reminiscent of a running engine.

On December 27, a section of U.S. Highway 231 in nearby Wilson County, Tennessee, was shut down because a box truck was playing audio "similar to what was heard" before the bombing. The truck was traveling north from the Walterhill community in Rutherford County along Highway 231 when it was pulled over. The Rutherford County Sheriff's Department arrested the driver and no explosives were found. He was charged with two felony counts of filing a false report and one of tampering with evidence, and held on $500,000 bond.

On December 31, police evacuated and cordoned off downtown Lexington, Kentucky, because of a suspicious RV parked in the area. An officer spotted the RV and, citing concerns ensuing from the Nashville bombing, brought in an explosives-sniffing dog to inspect it. The dog indicated that the RV contained explosives, prompting the evacuations. The scene was declared clear two hours later after no explosives were found and police had found the driver.

=== Affected residents and businesses ===
Over 60 different buildings, including both commercial and residential properties, were affected by the blast. Over 1,000 people were left jobless, and over 400 local residents were displaced from their homes. Over a third of all directly affected buildings remained temporarily or permanently closed a year later. Of those that were shuttered, several cited hardship from both the blast and the COVID-19 pandemic as factors. Among those closed were the George Jones Museum and Bar, The Old Spaghetti Factory, a Hooters, and a franchise of The Melting Pot. Some affected businesses, such as the Coyote Ugly Saloon, remained temporarily closed for extended periods, while others were forced to move out of their 2nd Avenue venues.

== Recovery ==
After the bombing, the Metropolitan Development and Housing Agency, aka the MDHA, closed Second Ave to rebuild the affected buildings. On December 22, 2025, just three days before the fifth anniversary of the bombing, the street was reopened to the public, although some buildings remain closed as of June 2026.

== See also ==
- 2025 Palm Springs fertility clinic bombing
- 2025 Las Vegas Cybertruck explosion
