= List of colleges and universities in Tennessee =

This is a list of colleges and universities in Tennessee. This list also includes other educational institutions providing higher education.

== Institutions ==
=== Colleges and universities ===
Institution	Location	Control	Type (Note: School types are based on the Carnegie Classification of Institutions of Higher Education.)	Enrollment (Fall 2024)	Founded
American Baptist College (Note: Historically black college or university)	Nashville	Private (Baptist)	Special Focus: Theological Studies	46	1924
Aquinas College	Nashville	Private (Roman Catholic)			1961
Austin Peay State University	Clarksville	Public	Undergraduate/Graduate-Master’s (Research)	10,439	1927
Baptist Health Sciences University	Memphis	Private (Baptist)	Special Focus: Nursing	891	1912
Belmont University	Nashville	Private (Nondenominational)	Undergraduate/Graduate-Doctorate	8,803	1890
Bethel University	McKenzie	Private (Presbyterian)	Baccalaureate	2,936	1871
Bryan College	Dayton	Private (Nondenominational)	Undergraduate/Graduate-Master’s	1,701	1930
Carson-Newman University	Jefferson City	Private (Baptist)	Undergraduate/Graduate-Doctorate	2,669	1851
Christian Brothers University	Memphis	Private (Catholic)	Undergraduate/Graduate-Master’s	1,772	1871
Crown College	Powell	Private (Independent Baptist)			1991
Cumberland University	Lebanon	Private	Associate/Baccalaureate	3,457	1842
East Tennessee State University	Johnson City	Public	Undergraduate/Graduate-Doctorate (R2)	13,728	1911
Fisk University (Note: Historically black college or university)	Nashville	Private	Special Focus: Arts and Sciences (Research)	1,059	1866
Freed-Hardeman University	Henderson	Private (Churches of Christ)	Undergraduate/Graduate-Master’s	2,306	1869
Johnson University	Knoxville	Private (Christian Churches)	Special Focus: Theological Studies	978	1893
King University	Bristol	Private (Presbyterian & E.P.C.)	Undergraduate/Graduate-Master’s	1,157	1867
Knoxville College	Knoxville	Private			1875
Lane College (Note: Historically black college or university)	Jackson	Private (C.M.E.)	Special Focus: Arts and Sciences	738	1888
Lee University	Cleveland	Private (Church of God)	Baccalaureate	3,714	1918
LeMoyne-Owen College (Note: Historically black college or university)	Memphis	Private (United Church of Christ)	Baccalaureate	659	1862
Lincoln Memorial University	Harrogate	Private	Special Focus: Medical Schools and Centers	6,081	1897
Lipscomb University	Nashville	Private (Churches of Christ)	Undergraduate/Graduate-Doctorate	5,017	1891
Maryville College	Maryville	Private (Presbyterian)	Baccalaureate	1,136	1819
Meharry Medical College (Note: Historically black college or university)	Nashville	Private (Methodist)	Special Focus: Medical Schools and Centers	1,226	1876
Mid-America Baptist Theological Seminary	Cordova	Private (Baptist)			1971
Middle Tennessee State University	Murfreesboro	Public	Undergraduate/Graduate-Master’s (R2)	20,488	1911
Mid-South Christian College	Memphis	Private (Christian Churches)	Special Focus: Theological Studies	32	1959
Milligan University	Carter County	Private (Christian Churches)	Undergraduate/Graduate-Master’s	1,240	1866
Nashville School of Law	Nashville	Private			1911
New College Franklin	Nashville	Private (Nondenominational)	Special Focus: Arts and Sciences		2009
Omega Graduate School	Dayton	Private	Special Focus: Theological Studies	69	1980
Pentecostal Theological Seminary	Cleveland	Private (Church of God)	Special Focus: Theological Studies	517	1975
Rhodes College	Memphis	Private	Special Focus: Arts and Sciences	1,861	1848
Sewanee: The University of the South	Sewanee	Private (Episcopal)	Special Focus: Arts and Sciences	1,724	1857
South College	Knoxville	Private (For-profit)	Special Focus: Other Health Professions	11,557	1882
Southern Adventist University	Collegedale	Private (Adventist)	Baccalaureate	3,229	1892
Southern College of Optometry	Memphis	Private	Special Focus: Other Health Professions	530	1932
Tennessee Bible College	Cookeville	Private (Churches of Christ)			1915
Tennessee State University (Note: Historically black college or university)	Nashville	Public	Undergraduate/Graduate-Doctorate (R2)	6,310	1912
Tennessee Technological University	Cookeville	Public	Undergraduate/Graduate-Master’s (R2)	10,511	1915
Tennessee Wesleyan University	Athens	Private (Methodist)	Baccalaureate	1,198	1857
Trevecca Nazarene University	Nashville	Private (Nazarene)	Undergraduate/Graduate-Doctorate	3,195	1901
Tusculum University	Tusculum	Private (Presbyterian)	Undergraduate/Graduate-Master’s	1,103	1794
Union University	Jackson	Private (Baptist)	Undergraduate/Graduate-Doctorate	2,713	1823
University of Memphis	Memphis	Public	Undergraduate/Graduate-Doctorate (R1)	20,276	1912
University of Tennessee (Flagship university)	Knoxville	Public	Undergraduate/Graduate-Doctorate (R1)	38,728	1794
University of Tennessee at Chattanooga	Chattanooga	Public	Undergraduate/Graduate-Master’s (Research)	11,775	1886
University of Tennessee Health Science Center	Memphis	Public	Special Focus: Medical Schools and Centers	3,101	1911
University of Tennessee at Martin	Martin	Public	Undergraduate/Graduate-Master’s	7,499	1900
University of Tennessee Southern	Pulaski	Public	Baccalaureate	1,046	1870
Vanderbilt University	Nashville	Private	Undergraduate/Graduate-Doctorate (R1)	13,575	1873
Welch College	Gallatin	Private (Baptist)	Special Focus: Arts and Sciences	389	1942
Williamson College	Franklin	Private (Nondenominational)	Special Focus: Business	64	1997

== Defunct colleges and universities ==
Name	Location	Control	Carnegie Classification	Founded	Defunct	Fate
Bolivar College	Madisonville	Private		1850	1907	Closed
Burritt College	Spencer	Private		1848	1939	Closed
Daymar College	Clarksville, Murfreesboro, Nashville	Private		1963	2018	acquired by Hussian College
Hiwassee College	Madisonville	Private	Baccalaureate / Associates Colleges	1849	2019	Closed
Lambuth University	Jackson	Private		1843	2011	Acquired by University of Memphis
Memphis College of Art	Memphis	Private	Masters University	1936	2020	Closed
Memphis Theological Seminary	Cordova	Private (Presbyterian)	Special Focus: Theological Studies	1852	2026	Closed
Morristown College	Morristown	Private		1881	1989	Acquired by Knoxville College
O'More College of Design	Franklin	Private	Baccalaureate / Associates Colleges	1969	2018	Merged with Belmont University
Peabody College	Nashville	Private		1875	1979	Merged with Vanderbilt University
Scarritt College	Nashville	Private		1892	1988	Closed
Tennessee Temple University	Chattanooga	Private	Doctoral University	1946	2015	Merged with Carolina University
Victory University	Memphis	Private		1941	2014	Closed
Ward–Belmont College	Nashville	Private		1913	1951	Closed, campus sold to Belmont University

== Tennessee Board of Regents ==
=== Two-year institutions ===
- Chattanooga State Community College, Chattanooga
- Cleveland State Community College, Cleveland
- Columbia State Community College, Columbia
- Dyersburg State Community College, Dyersburg
- Jackson State Community College, Jackson
- Motlow State Community College, Lynchburg
- Nashville State Community College, Nashville
- Northeast State Community College, Blountville
- Pellissippi State Community College, Knoxville
- Roane State Community College, Harriman
- Southwest Tennessee Community College, Memphis
- Volunteer State Community College, Gallatin
- Walters State Community College, Morristown

=== Colleges of Applied Technology ===
- Tennessee College of Applied Technology - Athens
- Tennessee College of Applied Technology - Chattanooga, Chattanooga
- Tennessee College of Applied Technology - Covington
- Tennessee College of Applied Technology - Crossville
- Tennessee College of Applied Technology - Crump, Crump
- Tennessee College of Applied Technology -Dickson
- Tennessee College of Applied Technology - Elizabethton
- Tennessee College of Applied Technology - Harriman
- Tennessee College of Applied Technology - Hartsville
- Tennessee College of Applied Technology - Hohenwald
- Tennessee College of Applied Technology - Jacksboro
- Tennessee College of Applied Technology - Jackson
- Tennessee College of Applied Technology - Knoxville
- Tennessee College of Applied Technology - Livingston
- Tennessee College of Applied Technology - McKenzie
- Tennessee College of Applied Technology - McMinnville
- Tennessee College of Applied Technology - Memphis
- Tennessee College of Applied Technology - Morristown, Morristown
- Tennessee College of Applied Technology - Murfreesboro
- Tennessee College of Applied Technology - Nashville
- Tennessee College of Applied Technology - Newbern, Newbern
- Tennessee College of Applied Technology - Oneida
- Tennessee College of Applied Technology - Paris
- Tennessee College of Applied Technology - Pulaski, Pulaski
- Tennessee College of Applied Technology - Ripley
- Tennessee College of Applied Technology - Shelbyville, Shelbyville
- Tennessee College of Applied Technology - Whiteville

== Private institutions ==
=== Two-year institutions ===
- American National University, Nashville
- John A. Gupton College, Nashville
- Remington College
  - Nashville
  - Memphis
- Miller-Motte Technical College
  - Chattanooga

== See also ==
- Higher education in the United States
- List of college athletic programs in Tennessee
- List of American institutions of higher education
- List of recognized higher education accreditation organizations
- List of colleges and universities
- List of colleges and universities by country
