= List of college athletic programs in Tennessee =

This is a list of college athletic programs in the U.S. state of Tennessee.

== NCAA ==
=== Division I ===
Full NCAA Division I member colleges in Tennessee.
– FBS Football, – FCS Football, – Non-football

Team	School	City	Conference	Sport sponsorship								
Team	School	City	Conference	Foot- ball	Basketball		Base- ball	Soft- ball	Ice Hockey		Soccer	
Team	School	City	Conference	Foot- ball	M	W	Base- ball	Soft- ball	M	W	M	W
Austin Peay Governors	Austin Peay State University	Clarksville	ASUN	FCS (Note: Austin Peay's football program competes in the United Athletic Conference.)	Yes	Yes	Yes	Yes	No	No	No	Yes
Belmont Bruins	Belmont University	Nashville	Missouri Valley	No	Yes	Yes	Yes	Yes	No	No	Yes	Yes
Chattanooga Mocs	University of Tennessee at Chattanooga	Chattanooga	Southern	FCS	Yes	Yes	No	Yes	No	No	No	Yes
East Tennessee State Buccaneers	East Tennessee State University	Johnson City	Southern	FCS	Yes	Yes	Yes	Yes	No	No	Yes	Yes
Lipscomb Bisons	Lipscomb University	Nashville	ASUN	No	Yes	Yes	Yes	Yes	No	No	Yes	Yes
Memphis Tigers	University of Memphis	Memphis	AAC	FBS	Yes	Yes	Yes	Yes	No	No	Yes	Yes
Middle Tennessee Blue Raiders	Middle Tennessee State University	Murfreesboro	C-USA	FBS	Yes	Yes	Yes	Yes	No	No	No	Yes
Tennessee Volunteers	University of Tennessee	Knoxville	SEC	FBS	Yes	Yes	Yes	Yes	No	No	No	Yes
Tennessee State Tigers and Lady Tigers	Tennessee State University	Nashville	Ohio Valley	FCS	Yes	Yes	No	Yes	Yes	No	No	No
Tennessee Tech Golden Eagles	Tennessee Technological University	Cookeville	Southern	FCS	Yes	Yes	Yes	Yes	No	No	No	Yes
UT Martin Skyhawks	University of Tennessee at Martin	Martin	Ohio Valley	FCS	Yes	Yes	Yes	Yes	No	No	No	Yes
Vanderbilt Commodores	Vanderbilt University	Nashville	SEC	FBS	Yes	Yes	Yes	No	No	No	No	Yes

=== Division II ===
Full NCAA Division II member colleges in Tennessee.
– Football, – Non-football

Team	School	City	Conference	Sport sponsorship								
Team	School	City	Conference	Foot- ball	Basketball		Base- ball	Soft- ball	Ice Hockey		Soccer	
Team	School	City	Conference	Foot- ball	M	W	Base- ball	Soft- ball	M	W	M	W
Carson–Newman Eagles	Carson–Newman University	Jefferson City	South Atlantic	Yes	Yes	Yes	Yes	Yes	No	No	Yes	Yes
Christian Brothers Buccaneers	Christian Brothers University	Memphis	Gulf South	No	Yes	Yes	Yes	Yes	No	No	Yes	Yes
King Tornado	King University	Bristol	Carolinas	No	Yes	Yes	Yes	Yes	No	No	Yes	Yes
Lane Dragons	Lane College	Jackson	SIAC	Yes	Yes	Yes	Yes	Yes	No	No	No	No
Lee Flames	Lee University	Cleveland	Gulf South	No	Yes	Yes	Yes	Yes	No	No	Yes	Yes
LeMoyne–Owen Magicians	LeMoyne–Owen College	Memphis	SIAC	No	Yes	Yes	Yes	Yes	No	No	No	No
Lincoln Memorial Railsplitters	Lincoln Memorial University	Harrogate	South Atlantic	No	Yes	Yes	Yes	Yes	No	No	Yes	Yes
Trevecca Nazarene Trojans	Trevecca Nazarene University	Nashville	Gulf South	No	Yes	Yes	Yes	Yes	No	No	Yes	Yes
Tusculum Pioneers	Tusculum University	Tusculum	South Atlantic	Yes	Yes	Yes	Yes	Yes	No	No	Yes	Yes
Union Bulldogs	Union University	Jackson	Gulf South	No	Yes	Yes	Yes	Yes	No	No	Yes	Yes

=== Division III ===
Full NCAA Division III member colleges in Tennessee

Team	School	City	Conference	Sport sponsorship								
Team	School	City	Conference	Foot- ball	Basketball		Base- ball	Soft- ball	Ice Hockey		Soccer	
Team	School	City	Conference	Foot- ball	M	W	Base- ball	Soft- ball	M	W	M	W
Maryville Scots	Maryville College	Maryville	CCS	Yes (Note: Maryville's football team competes in USA South.)	Yes	Yes	Yes	Yes	No	No	Yes	Yes
Rhodes Lynx	Rhodes College	Memphis	SAA	Yes	Yes	Yes	Yes	Yes	No	No	Yes	Yes
Sewanee Tigers	Sewanee: The University of the South	Sewanee	SAA	Yes	Yes	Yes	Yes	Yes	No	No	Yes	Yes

== NAIA ==
Full NAIA member colleges in Tennessee.
– Football, – Non-football, - Women's Flag Football

Team	School	City	Conference	Sport sponsorship						
Team	School	City	Conference	Foot- ball	Basketball		Base- ball	Soft- ball	Soccer	
Team	School	City	Conference	Foot- ball	M	W	Base- ball	Soft- ball	M	W
Bethel Wildcats	Bethel University	McKenzie	Mid-South	Yes	Yes	Yes	Yes	Yes	Yes	Yes
Bryan Lions	Bryan College	Dayton	Appalachian	No	Yes	Yes	Yes	Yes	Yes	Yes
Cumberland Phoenix	Cumberland University	Lebanon	Mid-South	Yes	Yes	Yes	Yes	Yes	Yes	Yes
Fisk Bulldogs	Fisk University	Nashville	Gulf Coast	No	Yes	Yes	No	No	Yes	No
Freed–Hardeman Lions	Freed–Hardeman University	Henderson	Mid-South	No	Yes	Yes	Yes	Yes	Yes	Yes
Johnson Royals	Johnson University	Kimberlin Heights	Appalachian	No	Yes	Yes	Yes	Yes	Yes	Yes
UT Southern Firehawks	University of Tennessee Southern	Pulaski	Southern States	No	Yes	Yes	Yes	Yes	Yes	Yes
Milligan Buffaloes	Milligan University	Elizabethton	Appalachian	(Note: Milligan sponsors flag football as a women's varsity sport.)	Yes	Yes	Yes	Yes	Yes	Yes
Tennessee Wesleyan Bulldogs	Tennessee Wesleyan University	Athens	Appalachian	No	Yes	Yes	Yes	Yes	Yes	Yes

== NJCAA ==
Team	School	City	Conference
Chattanooga State Tech Tigers	Chattanooga State Technical Community College	Chattanooga	Tennessee J&CC
Cleveland State Cougars	Cleveland State Community College	Cleveland	Tennessee J&CC
Columbia State Chargers	Columbia State Community College	Columbia	Tennessee J&CC
Dyersburg State Eagles	Dyersburg State Community College	Dyersburg	Tennessee J&CC
Jackson State Green Jays	Jackson State Community College	Jackson	Tennessee J&CC
Motlow State Bucks	Motlow State Community College	Lynchburg	Tennessee J&CC
Pellissippi State Panthers	Pellissippi State Community College	Knoxville	Tennessee J&CC
Roane State Raiders	Roane State Community College	Harriman	Tennessee J&CC
Southwest Tennessee Saluqis	Southwest Tennessee Community College	Memphis	Tennessee J&CC
Volunteer State Pioneers	Volunteer State Community College	Gallatin	Tennessee J&CC
Walters State Senators	Walters State Community College	Morristown	Tennessee J&CC

== NCCAA ==
Team	School	City	Conference
Nashville Bible Phoenix	Nashville Bible College	Nashville	
Welch Flames	Welch College	Gallatin	

== USCAA ==
Team	School	City	Conference
Crown Royal Crusaders	Crown College	Powell	

== See also ==
- List of NCAA Division I institutions
- List of NCAA Division II institutions
- List of NCAA Division III institutions
- List of NAIA institutions
- List of USCAA institutions
- List of NCCAA institutions
- List of NJCAA Division I institutions
- List of NJCAA Division II institutions
- List of NJCAA Division III institutions
