= Tennessee Junior and Community College Athletic Association =

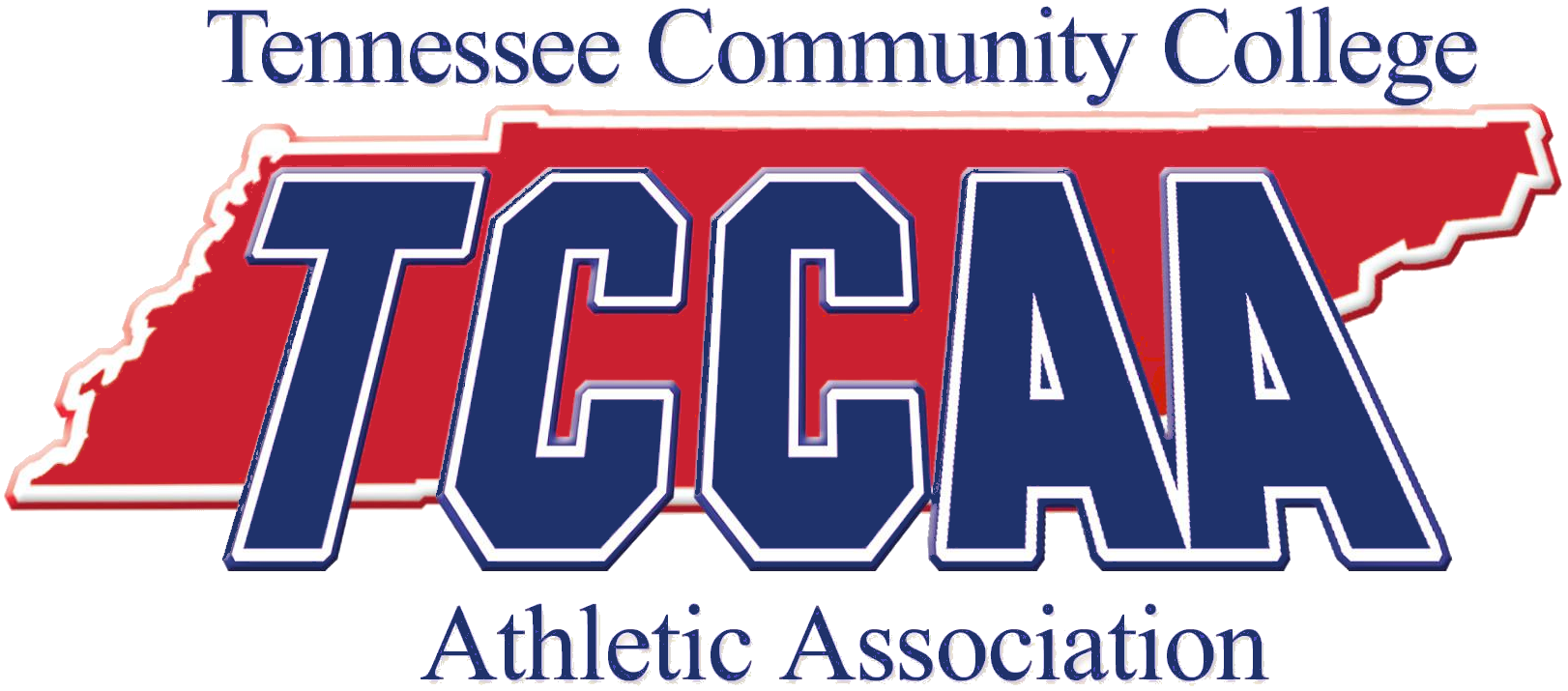
- Association: NJCAA
- Founded: 1968; 58 years ago
- Sports fielded: 18 (10 men's, 8 women's)
- Division: Region 7
- No. of teams: 11
- Headquarters: Memphis, Tennessee
- Region: Tennessee
- Official website: tjccaa.com

Also known as the TJCCAA and Region 7, the Tennessee Junior and Community College Athletic Conference, commonly referred to as the Tennessee Community College Athletic Association (TCCAA) and a member of the National Junior College Athletic Association (NJCAA), is a junior college athletic conference for technological and community colleges in Tennessee and Kentucky. Conference championships are held in most sports and individuals can be named to All-Conference and All-Academic teams.

== Member schools ==
=== Current members ===
The TJCCAC currently has 11 full members, all are public schools:

Institution	Location (Note: All locations are within the State of Tennessee.)	Founded	Affiliation	Enrollment	Nickname	Joined	Division
Chattanooga State Community College	Chattanooga	1965	Public (Note: Part of the Tennessee Board of Regents.)	10,121	Tigers	?	Eastern
Cleveland State Community College	Cleveland	1967	Public	3,700	Cougars	1968	Eastern
Columbia State Community College	Columbia	1966	Public	5,437	Chargers	1968	Western
Dyersburg State Community College	Dyersburg	1969	Public	?	Eagles	?	Western
Jackson State Community College	Jackson	1967	Public	?	Green Jays	1968	Western
Motlow State Community College	Tullahoma	1969	Public	5,000	Bucks	?	Eastern
Pellissippi State Community College	Hardin Valley	1974	Public	?	Panthers	2023	Eastern
Roane State Community College	Harriman	1969	Public	6,214	Raiders	?	Eastern
Southwest Tennessee Community College	Memphis	2000	Public	6,391	Saluqis	?	Western
Volunteer State Community College	Gallatin	1971	Public	8,900	Pioneers	?	Western
Walters State Community College	Morristown	1970	Public	6,980	Senators	?	Eastern

=== Former members ===
The TJCCAC had six former full members, all were private schools:

Institution	Location (Note: All locations are within the State of Tennessee.)	Founded	Affiliation	Enrollment	Nickname	Joined	Left	Current conference
Chattanooga City College	Chattanooga	1949	Baptist (HPBC)	N/A	?	1968	1969	N/A (Note: Merged with the University of Chattanooga to become the University of Tennessee at Chattanooga (UTC).)
Cumberland College (Note: Currently known as Cumberland University since 1982.)	Lebanon	1842	Nonsectarian	2,550	Phoenix	1968	?	Mid-South (MSC) (Note: Currently an NAIA athletic conference.)
Freed–Hardeman College (Note: Currently known as Freed–Hardeman University since 1990.)	Henderson	1869	Churches of Christ	2,283	Lions	1968	?	Mid-South (MSC)
Hiwassee College	Madisonville	1849	United; Methodist	N/A	Tigers	1968	?	Closed in 2019
Martin College (Note: Later known as Martin Methodist College in 1986; currently known as the University of Tennessee Southern since 2021.)	Pulaski	1870	Public (Note: Part of the University of Tennessee System.)	1,000	RedHawks	1968	?	Southern States (SSAC)
Morristown College	Morristown	1881	Methodist; Episcopal	N/A	Red Knights	1968	?	Closed in 1994
