= Tennessee Board of Regents =

Governing board for higher education (excl. the University of Tennessee system)

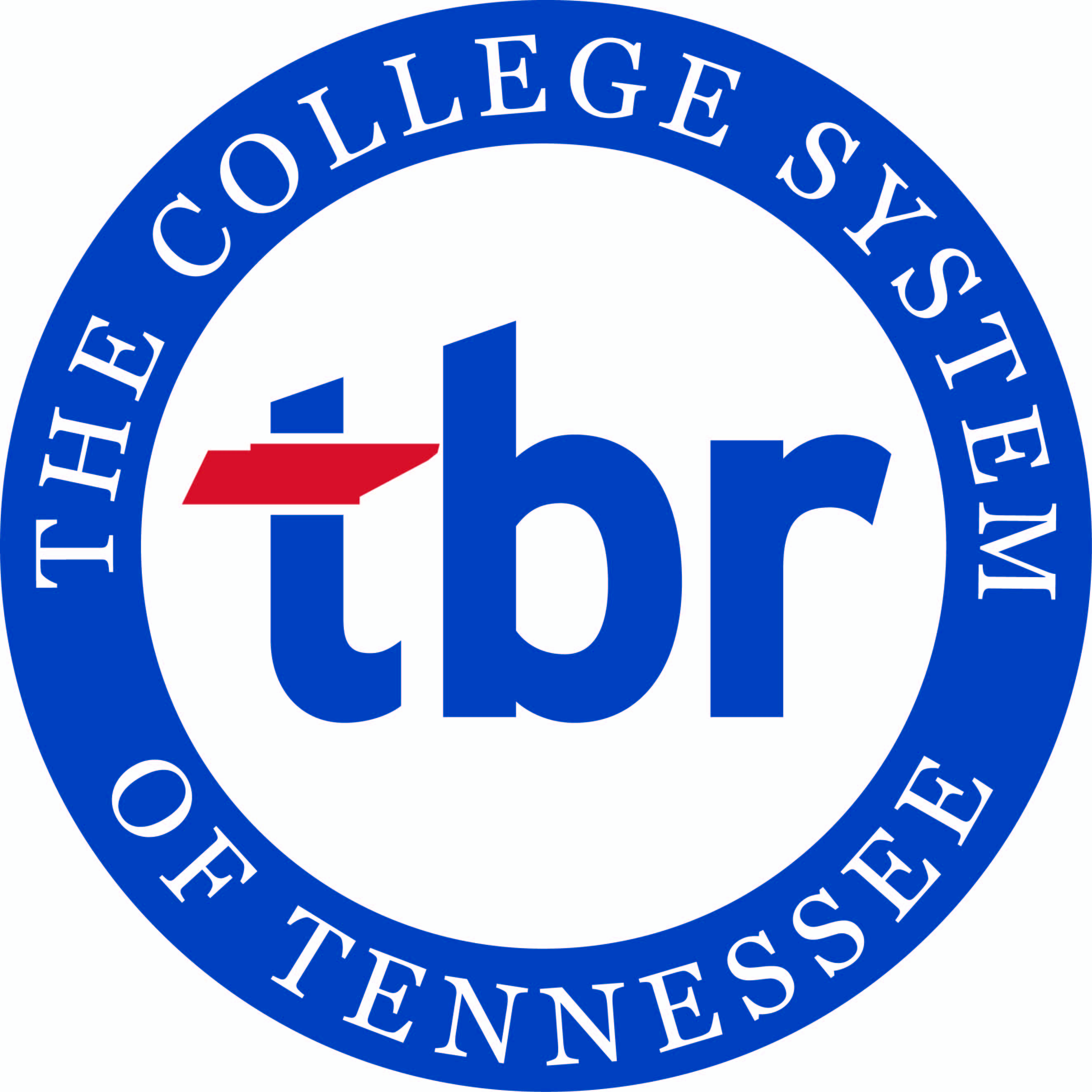

Agency overview
- Jurisdiction: Tennessee
- Agency executive: Flora Tydings, Chancellor
- Website: www.tbr.edu

The Tennessee Board of Regents (TBR or The College System of Tennessee) is a system of community and technical colleges in the U.S. state of Tennessee. It is one of two public higher education systems in the state, the other being the University of Tennessee system. It was authorized by an act of the Tennessee General Assembly passed in 1972. The TBR supervises all public community colleges and technical colleges in the state, serving over 110,000 students annually.

It was founded as the State University and Community College System of Tennessee. The TBR comprises 37 institutions: 13 community colleges and 24 Tennessee Colleges of Applied Technology, which are listed below. The Colleges of Applied Technology were added to TBR control in 1982. Unlike the situation in most states, TBR component institutions did not have their own board of directors, board of trustees, or similar bodies; the TBR hired institution presidents and directors and approves the promotions of senior faculty and staff. In 2015, Tennessee governor Bill Haslam announced a plan for the six universities of the TBR system to gain their own governing boards, while noting that "TBR would continue to provide key administrative support to the six state universities."

The professional head of the TBR system is its chancellor. The chancellor is responsible for guiding the TBR system in accordance with the board's direction and for managing the TBR central office in a manner consistent with the central office's mission and vision. Operational responsibilities and processes include day-to-day management of the system and the central office; board coordination, communication, and logistics; presidential searches; and dealing with the media and the general public, including handling complaints and general information requests.

The leaders of TBR colleges are presidents.

The Board of Regents is supported by the Tennessee Higher Education Commission ( THEC ), which attempts to coordinate the activities and goals of higher education in Tennessee. THEC provides the funding formula for institutions.

== Member institutions ==
=== Community colleges ===
- Chattanooga State Community College
- Cleveland State Community College
- Columbia State Community College
- Dyersburg State Community College
- Jackson State Community College
- Motlow State Community College
- Nashville State Community College
- Northeast State Community College
- Pellissippi State Community College
- Roane State Community College
- Southwest Tennessee Community College
- Volunteer State Community College
- Walters State Community College

=== Tennessee Colleges of Applied Technology (TCATs) ===
- Athens
- Chattanooga
- Covington
- Crossville
- Crump
- Dickson
- Elizabethton
- Harriman
- Hartsville
- Henry/Carroll
- Hohenwald
- Jacksboro
- Jackson
- Knoxville
- Livingston
- McMinnville
- Memphis
- Morristown
- Murfreesboro
- Nashville
- Northwest
- Onedia
- Pulaski
- Shelbyville
- Whiteville

== Governance ==
=== Chancellors ===
- C. C. Humphreys, 1972–1975
- Roy S. Nicks, 1975–1985
- Thomas J. Garland, 1986–1990
- Otis L. Floyd Jr., 1990–1993
- Charles E. Smith, 1994–2000
- Charles Manning, 2000–2010
- John G. Morgan, 2010–2016
- David Gregory (interim) 2016–2017
- Flora Tydings, February 1, 2017–present

=== Board ===
The Tennessee Board of Regents system is governed by 19 board members. The board meets four times each year at regularly scheduled meetings, and the chairman may call additional meetings during the year as needed. The 19 members of the board consist of: 12 lay citizens appointed for six-year terms by the governor, with one each from the state's nine congressional districts and three grand divisions; two faculty members from among the system institutions appointed by the governor for a one-year term; one student from among the system institutions appointed by the governor for a one-year term; and four ex officio members—the Governor of Tennessee, the Commissioner of Education, the Commissioner of Agriculture, and the Executive Director of the Tennessee Higher Education Commission, who is a non-voting member.

== See also ==
- List of colleges and universities in Tennessee
- Tennessee Blue Book
