= Tennessee College of Applied Technology - Chattanooga =

Coordinates: 35.096501°N 85.240303°W

- Motto: W.E. Succeed
- Type: Public technical college
- Established: 1969
- Director: Dr. Mike Ricketts
- Academic staff: 52
- Students: 2,300
- Location: 4501 Amnicola Highway, Chattanooga, Tennessee, 37406, United States
- Campus: Chattanooga State Community College
- Colors: Blue and Red
- Website: http://www.chattanoogastate.edu/tcat/

The Tennessee College of Applied Technology at Chattanooga is a technical school in Chattanooga, Tennessee. It is a part of the Tennessee Colleges of Applied Technology.

== History ==
The Tennessee College of Applied Technology - Chattanooga (TCAT) is the only TCAT that forms an integral part of the organization of a community college, forming a unit of Chattanooga State Community College, a Tennessee Board of Regents institution serving more than 2,300 students annually. The school was founded in 1969 as the Chattanooga Area Vocational Technical School (AVTS). On July 1, 1981, the AVTS became a part of Chattanooga State. In 1996, the Tennessee Board of Regents renamed the AVTS to the Tennessee Technology Center at Chattanooga.

The Tennessee Technology Center at Chattanooga became the Tennessee College of Applied Technology - Chattanooga on July 1, 2013 under Senate Bill No. 643 House Bill No. 236*. Approval of Public Chapter No. 473.

The TCAT-Chattanooga offers 21 one-year diploma programs and 7 certificate programs with a total of 42 faculty and staff, making it one of the larger divisions on the campus of Chattanooga State. The faculty members are dedicated full-time to teaching and advising students, being well prepared to teach, with many having work experience in business and industry.

== Academics ==
Each of the Tennessee Colleges of Applied Technology offers programs based on geographic needs of businesses and industry. Therefore each college can have different academic programs and offerings. The following academic programs are available at TCAT Chattanooga.

- Aesthetics
- Air Conditioning/Refrigeration
- Automotive Mechatronics
- Automotive Technology
- Building Construction Tech
- Business Systems Technology
- Collision Repair
- Commercial Truck Driving
- Computer Operations Technology
- Cosmetology
- Diesel Equipment Mechanics
- Industrial Electricity
- Industrial Electronics
- Industrial Maintenance Mechanics
- Landscape and Turf Management
- Machine Tool Technology
- Manicurist
- Masonry
- Massage Therapy
- Medical Assistant
- Motorcycle & Marine Service Technology
- Practical Nursing
- Security
- Surgical Technology
- Plumbing
- Welding

== Student organizations ==
The Tennessee College of Applied Technology at Chattanooga State provides memberships and organizations for students, including the following:

- National Technical Honor Society
- SkillsUSA
- Student Government Association

== Professional memberships ==
- American Welding Society
- CompTIA
- Microsoft

== Accreditation ==
The Tennessee College of Applied Technology - Chattanooga is accredited by the Council of Occupational Education (COE), a regional accrediting agency of the Southern Association of Colleges and Schools (SACS).

== See also ==
- List of colleges and universities in Tennessee
