= Tennessee Colleges of Applied Technology =

- Former names: State Area Vocational-Technical School (1967–1994); Tennessee Technology Centers (1994–2013)
- Type: Public technical college system
- Established: 1967
- Students: 34,486
- Location: Tennessee, United States
- Campus: 26 campuses

The Tennessee Colleges of Applied Technology (TCAT) is a public technical college system operated by the Tennessee Board of Regents. It has 24 campuses located throughout the US state of Tennessee. It was previously named the Tennessee Technology Centers.

As of March 2025, the TCAT campuses have a combined enrollment of 34,486 students, with the most popular programs being truck driving, welding, automotive technology, practical nursing, and cosmetology.

== History ==
TCAT was founded as the State Area Vocational-Technical Schools. Construction began on the first three urban locations, Memphis, Nashville, and Knoxville, in July 1966. The Knoxville campus opened in January 1968. In 1994, State Area Vocational-Technical Schools were rebranded as Tennessee Technology Centers. Tennessee Technology Centers received praise from Complete College America in a 2011 report for their high degree completion rate of 75 percent.

In July 2013, Tennessee Technology Centers was rebranded as Tennessee Colleges of Applied Technology to clearly communicate the post-secondary training offered.

== Campuses ==
Tennessee Colloges of Applied Technology locations, 2025.

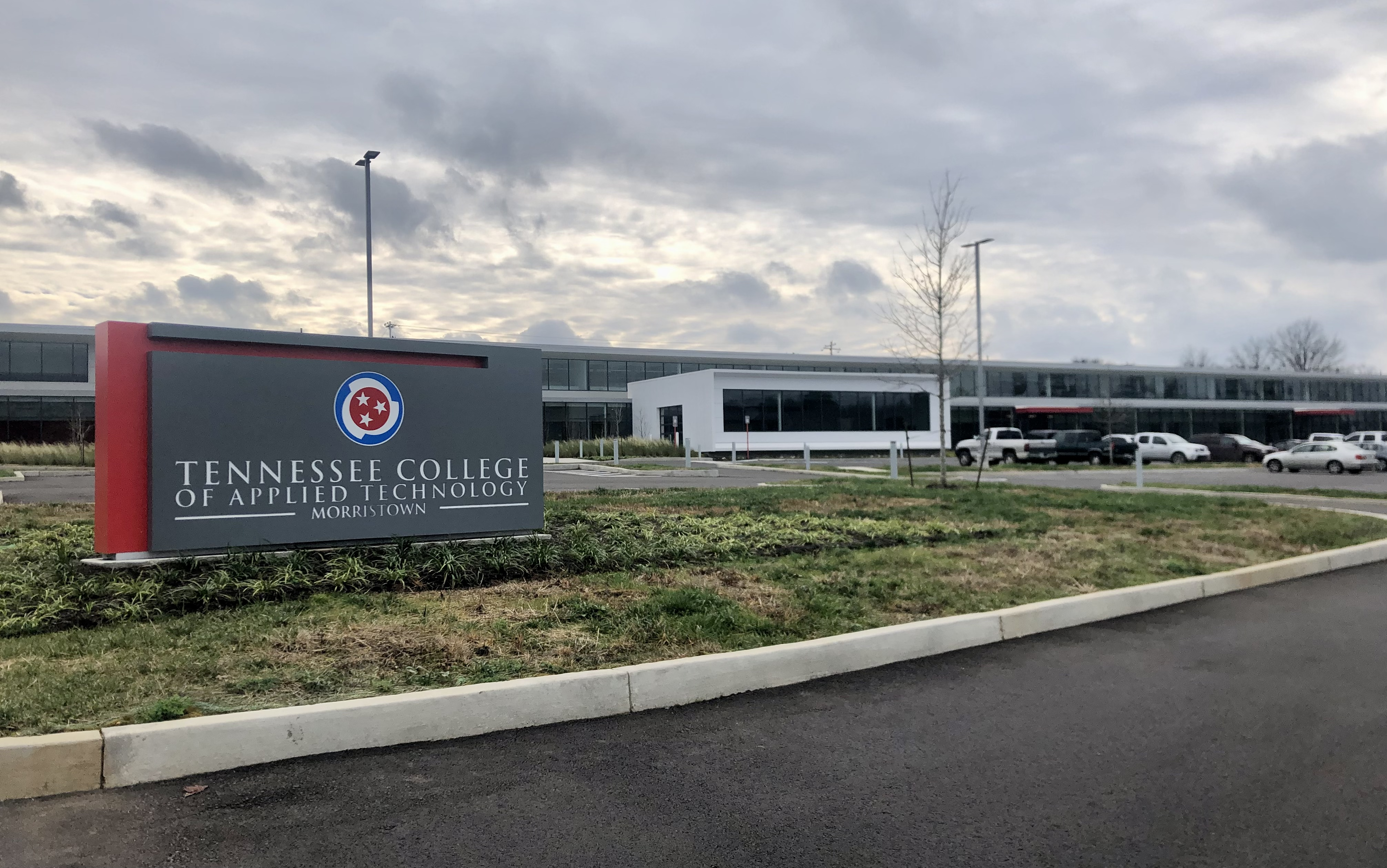
TCAT Morristown

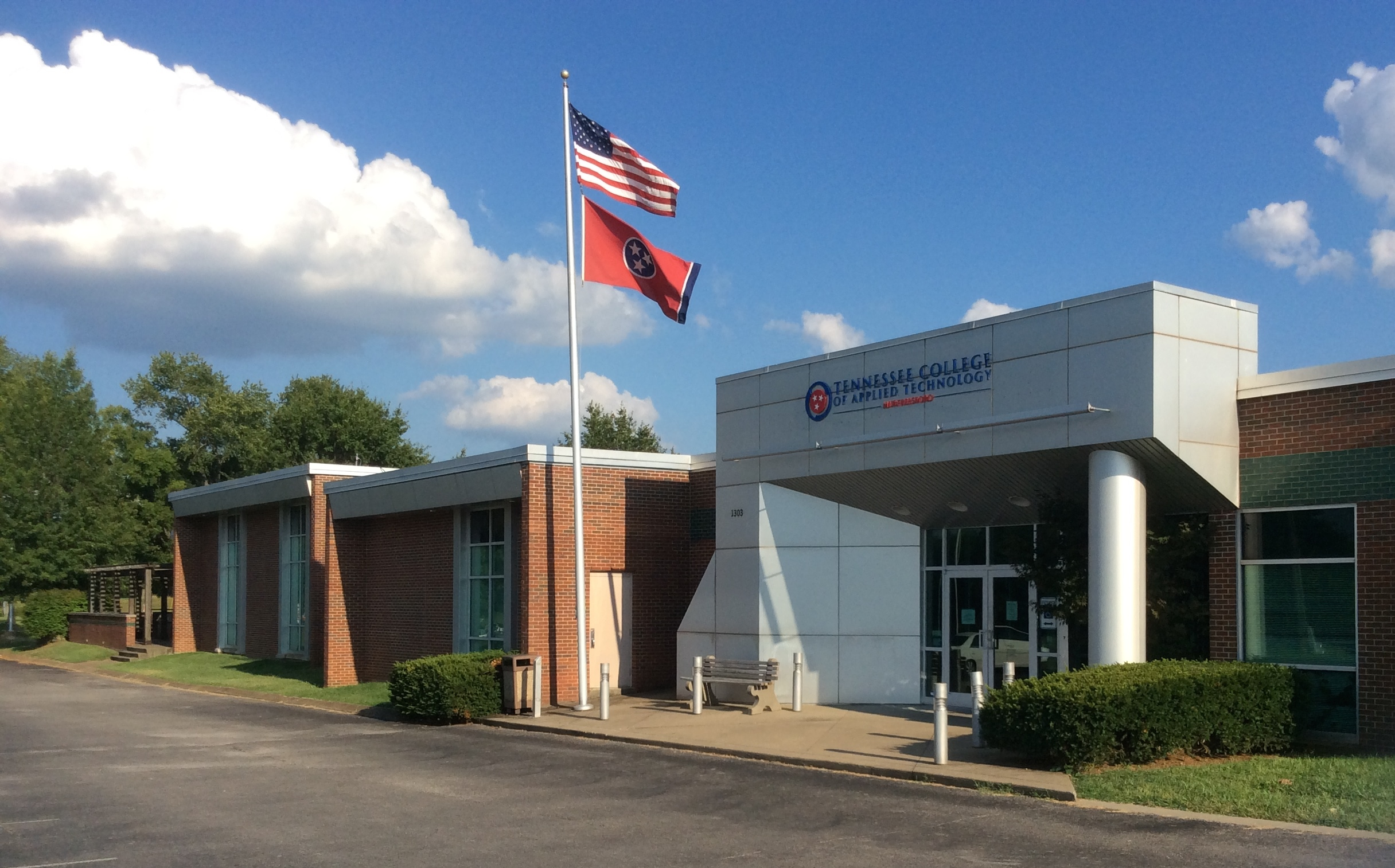
TCAT Murfreesboro

TCAT has 26 campuses and several branches from other campuses:

- TCAT Athens
- TCAT Brownsville
- TCAT Chattanooga
- TCAT Covington
- TCAT Clarksville - Branch of Dickson Campus
- TCAT Crossville
- TCAT Crump
- TCAT Dickson
- TCAT Elizabethton
- TCAT Fayetteville—Branch of Shelbyville Campus
- TCAT Greeneville —Branch of Morristown Campus
- TCAT Harriman
- TCAT Hartsville-Trousdale
- TCAT Hohenwald
- TCAT Huntsville
- TCAT Jacksboro
- TCAT Kingsport—Branch of Elizabethton Campus
- TCAT Knoxville
- TCAT Lewisburg—Branch of Shelbyville Campus
- TCAT Livingston
- TCAT McKenzie
- TCAT McMinnville
- TCAT Memphis
- TCAT Morristown
- TCAT Murfreesboro
- TCAT Nashville
- TCAT Newbern
- TCAT Oneida—Branch of Huntsville Campus
- TCAT Paris
- TCAT Pulaski
- TCAT Ripley
- TCAT Surgoinsville—Branch of Morristown Campus
- TCAT Tazewell—Branch of Morristown campus
- TCAT Shelbyville
- TCAT Whiteville
- TCAT Winchester—Branch of Shelbyville Campus
- TCAT Union City—Branch of Newbern Campus

== Academics ==
TCAT offers numerous programs and has partnerships with businesses. The Memphis campus offers a welding apprenticeship program with Morgan Steel company.

== See also ==
- List of colleges and universities in Tennessee
- Tennessee Board of Regents
