= Tennessee Wesleyan University =

Methodist university in Athens, Tennessee, US

- Former name: List: Athens Female College (1857–1866); East Tennessee Wesleyan College (1866–1967); East Tennessee Wesleyan University (1867–1886); Grant Memorial University (1886–1889); U.S. Grant Memorial University (1889–1906); Athens School of the University of Chattanooga (1906–1925); Tennessee Wesleyan College (1925–2016)
- Motto: Lux et Veritas
- Motto in English: Light and Truth
- Type: Private university
- Established: 1857; 169 years ago
- Religious affiliation: United Methodist Church
- Academic affiliations: NAICU; IAMSCU
- President: Dr. Tyler Forrest
- Faculty: 184
- Students: 1,052
- Location: Athens, Tennessee, U.S. 35.4453°N 84.5944°W
- Campus: Small city
- Colors: Blue & White
- Nickname: Bulldogs
- Sporting affiliations: NAIA – Appalachian
- Website: tnwesleyan.edu/
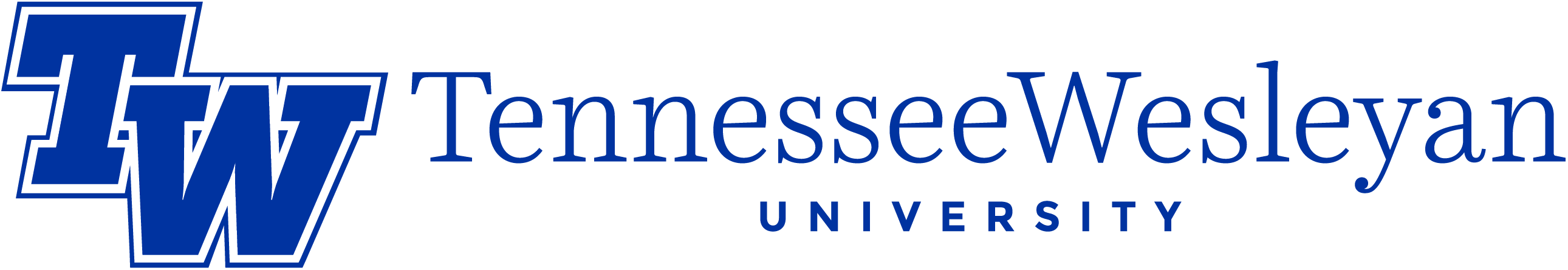

Tennessee Wesleyan University (TWU) is a private Methodist university in Athens, Tennessee. It was founded in 1857 and is affiliated with the Holston Conference of the United Methodist Church. It maintains a branch campus in Knoxville, where it offers evening programs in business administration. It also conducts its nursing classes in Knoxville.

== History ==
Tennessee Wesleyan was founded in 1857 as "Athens Female College". It consisted solely of one building (now Old College). In 1866 the name was altered to "East Tennessee Wesleyan College", and in 1867 it became "East Tennessee Wesleyan University". At that time, the college was one of only a handful of coeducational colleges in the Southern United States.

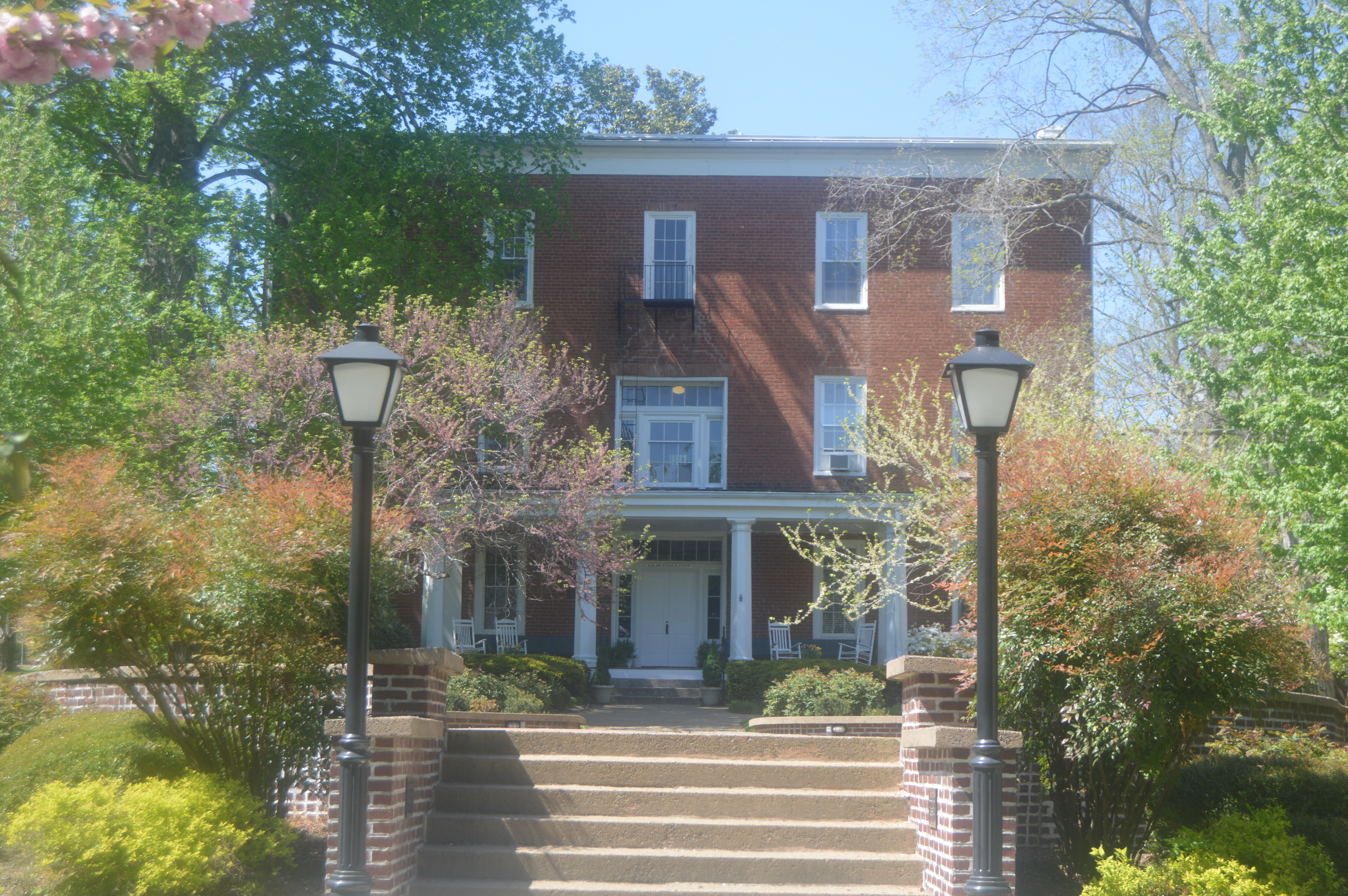
Old College

In 1886, college president John F. Spence changed the name to "Grant Memorial University" in an attempt to receive financial support from Northern benefactors.

In 1889, it merged with Chattanooga University to form "U.S. Grant Memorial University" (U.S. Grant University; U.S. being Grant's given names), becoming the consolidated university's Athens branch campus. Seventeen years later (1906), it was renamed the "Athens School of the University of Chattanooga".

In 1925, the college split from Chattanooga to become "Tennessee Wesleyan College" and served as a junior college. Tennessee Wesleyan became a liberal arts college in 1957 when it began awarding bachelor's degrees.

In February 2016, the school announced that they would change their name to Tennessee Wesleyan University, effective July 1, 2016. The decision would be the first name change for the school in 91 years.

== Academics ==
=== Articulation agreements ===
Tennessee Wesleyan University has articulation agreements with Chattanooga State Community College, Cleveland State Community College, Motlow State Community College, Pellissippi State Community College, Roane State Community College, and Walters State Community College.

=== Degrees ===
Tennessee Wesleyan University offers Bachelor of Arts and Bachelor of Science degrees in Behavioral Science, Biology, Business Administration, Chemistry, Communication, Criminal Justice, Early Human Development and Learning, Education, English, Exercise Science, Fine Art (Visual Art and Theatre), Music, individualized majors, History, Human Services, International Studies, Mathematics, Nursing, Psychology, Church Vocations, Pre-Seminary, Sociology, Social Work, and Special Education.

=== Admissions and rankings ===
Academic rankings

Baccalaureate
- Washington Monthly: 37

National
- U.S. News & World Report: 16 (Regional colleges South)

Tennessee Wesleyan University accepts 62% of all applicants and is considered "selective" by U.S. News & World Report.

== Athletics ==
The Tennessee Wesleyan athletic teams are called the Bulldogs. The university is a member of the National Association of Intercollegiate Athletics (NAIA), primarily competing in the Appalachian Athletic Conference (AAC) since the 2001–02 academic year.

Tennessee Wesleyan competes in 21 intercollegiate varsity sports: Men's sports include baseball, basketball, bowling, cross country, golf, lacrosse, soccer, tennis, track & field and volleyball; while women's sports include basketball, bowling, cross country, golf, lacrosse, soccer, softball, tennis, track & field and volleyball; and co-ed sports include cheerleading and eSports.

=== Baseball ===
The university's baseball team has won the NAIA World Series 3 times (2012, 2019, 2026) as well as 24 conference championships and 12 conference tournament championships.

== Notable alumni ==
- Carol Aebersold – co-author of The Elf on the Shelf
- Febb Burn - key player in the enacting of the 19th Amendment
- Tom Browning – MLB pitcher, member of the Cincinnati Reds Hall of Fame
- Ron Campbell – MLB infielder
- Chris Cattaneo – professional soccer player
- James Alexander Fowler – U.S. Assistant Attorney General and Knoxville mayor
- Aaron Grant – NFL center
- Xenophon Hicks - United States federal judge
- Leonard Lomell – decorated soldier, attorney and businessman
- Luella F. McWhirter – philanthropist, clubwoman, and temperance leader
- John T. Raulston – judge in the 1925 Scopes trial
