= University of Tennessee (disambiguation) =

The University of Tennessee is a public research university in Knoxville, Tennessee.

University of Tennessee may also refer to:

- University of Tennessee at Chattanooga
- University of Tennessee at Martin
- University of Tennessee Health Science Center
- University of Tennessee Southern
- University of Tennessee Space Institute
- University of Tennessee system

== See also ==
- Tennessee State University
- East Tennessee State University
- List of colleges and universities in Tennessee
