= Tent City (Tennessee) =

Encampment outside of Memphis in Fayette County, Tennessee

- Part of the Civil Rights Movement
- Date: 1960–1962
- Location: Fayette County and Haywood County in Tennessee
- Caused by: Civil Rights Act of 1957; Murder trial of Burton Dodson; All-white jury
- Result: Catalyst to pass Civil Rights Act of 1960

Parties
Civic and Welfare League (CWL); Fayette County Civic and Welfare League; Haywood County Civic and Welfare League; United States Commission on Civil Rights; National Association for the Advancement of Colored People (NAACP)	Fayette County Democratic Executive Committee; White Citizens Council (WCC); Ku Klux Klan (KKK)

Tent City, also called Freedom Village, was an encampment outside of Memphis in Fayette County, Tennessee for African Americans who were evicted from their homes and blacklisted from buying amenities as retaliation for registering to vote during the Civil Rights Movement. It began in 1960 and lasted about two years.

== Origins ==
In 1960, 1,400 Black Americans registered to vote in deeply segregated Fayette County. In retaliation, white landowners evicted 257 Black sharecroppers from their homes. Farming loans were also not being approved during this time based on voting registration. Shepard Towles, a local Black landowner, let the displaced farmers camp on his land. Towles stated, "These people had nowhere to go. I decided to let them come in free, let them use the water from my deep well—as long as it lasts." This became known as Tent City. Previously, John McFerren and Harpman Jameson founded the Fayette County Civic and Welfare League to 'promote civil and political and economic' community progress.

McFerren, Jameson, and J.F. Estes, a Memphis lawyer, travelled to Washington, D.C. to lobby the Justice Department to intervene on behalf of the sharecroppers. The Civil Rights Act of 1957 prohibits "against intimidating, coercing or otherwise interfering with the rights of persons to vote for the President and members of Congress." The white community then retaliated further by refusing to sell groceries and other amenities to Black registered voters.

== National attention ==
McFerren appealed to national newspapers to draw attention to the plight of residents in Tent City. Gulf Oil, Texeco, and Esso refused to deliver gasoline to McFerren's store. The NAACP called for a national boycott of these chains. Attorney General Robert Kennedy ordered the Justice Department to investigate civil rights violations in Fayette County. The AFL-CIO published a pamphlet, Tent City... "Home of the Brave" calling for donations. In 1961, trucks arrived with 150 tons of donated food and clothes. National attention drew white civil rights advocates from Cornell University, the University of Wisconsin, and the Religious Society of Friends (Quakers). The national attention intensified voter registration drives and this eventually led to black majority voter registration, though elections were still fixed in favor of whites.

Without many health workers to help the citizens who were a part of the tent city, people outside of environment would hear about the quality of life and send themselves to help. Black physician, Dr. Etheridge, from Jackson, Tennessee drove to the tent city to give his services to sick people.

== Dissolution ==
The largest impromptu settlement on Towles' farm lasted approximately two years. Residents moved with other black families or relocated to other parts of Tennessee. After the tent city was gone, there was still racial tensions in west Tennessee. But organizations provided economic and housing respite to those affect during this time. Both sides of peaceful protest and radical defenses were seen as Tennessee continued to have voting disagreements.
