= Viola Harris McFerren =

American civil rights activist

Viola Harris McFerren (1931–2013) was a civil rights activist in Fayette County, Tennessee. Born October 19, 1931, she went on to found the Fayette County Civic and Welfare League Inc., which was later called the Original Fayette Civic Welfare League Inc. After attending a high school for African Americans in 1947, McFerren later become involved in desegregating public schools, with her involvement in the McFerren v. County Board of Education of Fayette County Tennessee, which led to dismantling three “racially identifiable schools” and deconstructing a new school and its policies.

== Education ==
McFerren was born to Joseph T. Harris and Rose Etta Webb Harris as the eleventh of twelve children. She was raised in Benton County, Mississippi, "where she experienced racial injustices." She attended high school at the Fayette County Training School in Somerville, Tennessee and then went on to Jackson State Community College as well as Memphis State University. She became a licensed cosmetologist.

At 19, she married civil rights activist John McFerren and had five children. It was through his voter registration interests that she began her activism.

== Accomplishments ==
The Fayette County Civic and Welfare League Inc. which was later called the Original Fayette Civic Welfare League Inc. was founded by McFerren in 1959. In 1964 she submitted the first proposal to begin a Head Start program in Fayette County, which received funding for kindergarten and adult education programs. President Lyndon B. Johnson asked her to serve in the National Advisory Committee of the U.S. Office of Economic Opportunity in 1966, which administered the U.S. government's Anti-Poverty Program.

McFerren died on April 22, 2013, at the age of 81.

== Awards ==
In 1992 she was awarded the 1992 Women of Achievement in Heroism Award.
