= Nashville State Community College =

College in Nashville, Tennessee, U.S.

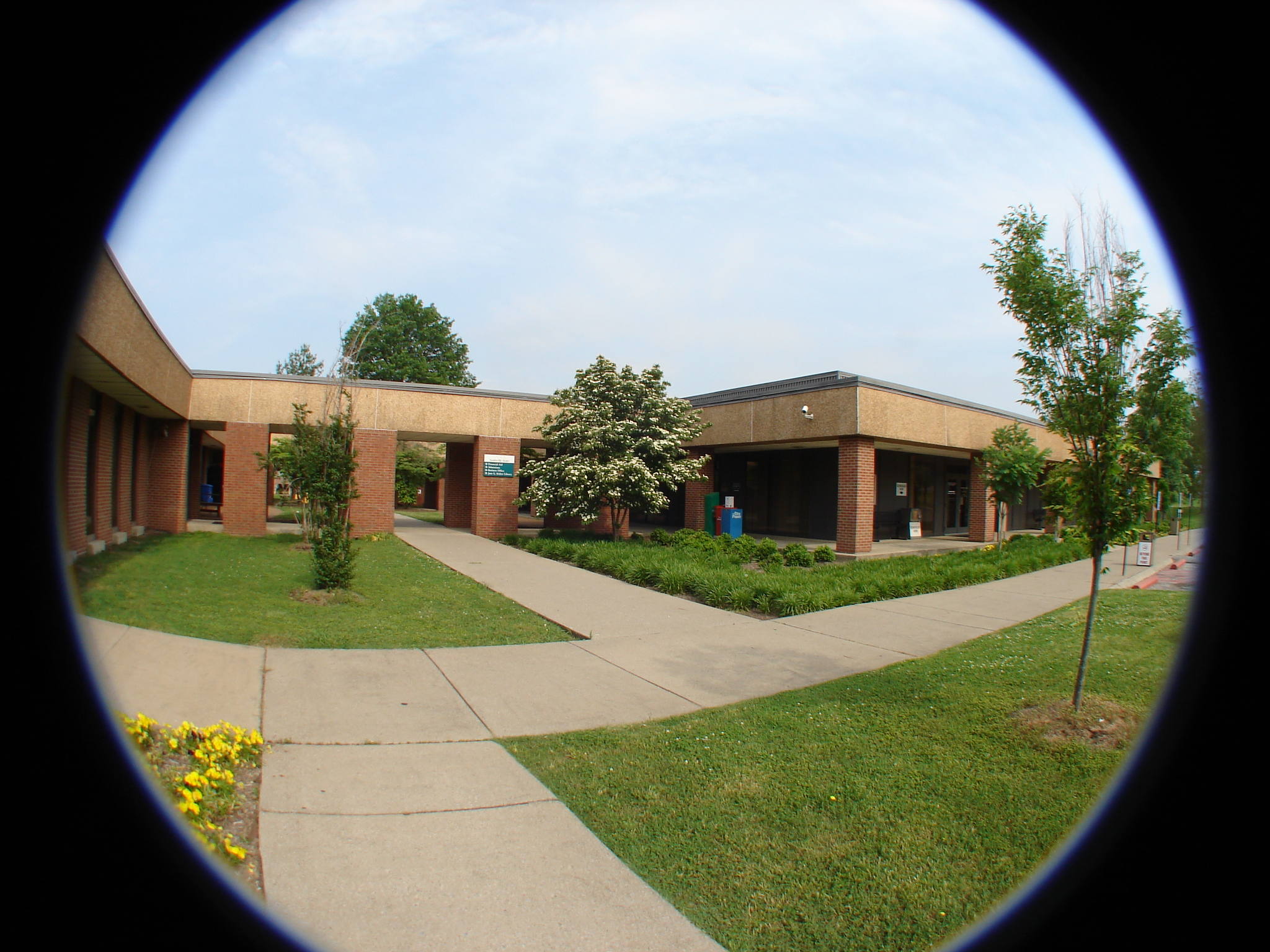
- Campus of Nashville State
- Type: Public community college
- Established: 1970
- Parent institution: Tennessee Board of Regents
- President: Shanna L. Jackson
- Undergraduates: 9,853
- Location: Nashville, Tennessee, United States; 36.1349°N 86.8568°W
- Campus: Urban, 109 acres (0.44 km^{2})
- Website: www.nscc.edu

Nashville State Community College is a public community college in Nashville, Tennessee. It is operated by the Tennessee Board of Regents and shares a 109-acre (0.44 km^{2}) campus with the Tennessee College of Applied Technology at Nashville. The Nashville State facilities include 239,000 square feet (22,200 m^{2}) of space for classrooms, labs, offices, student services, and a library. Nashville State offers a wide array of programs and degrees including associate degree and technical certificate studies, university parallel transfer programs to four-year institutions, continuing education, adult education, four Early College programs (fully immersive college experience at the Early College High School on the White Bridge campus and an embedded Early College program at Whites Creek, Glencliff, and Cane Ridge high schools), Dual Enrollment courses, and community service programs.

Nashville State serves a seven county service area of Middle Tennessee, which includes Cheatham, Davidson, Dickson, Houston, Humphreys, Montgomery, and Stewart counties. It is an open-entry institution with on-campus, online, virtual and hybrid options.

== History ==
It has its origins in a planned redevelopment of a campus on White Bridge Road which was formerly the site of Thayer Hospital, a hospital operated by what is now the United States Department of Veterans Affairs. When the hospital was relocated adjacent to Vanderbilt University and its Medical Center in the 1960s, part of its former campus became the home of Nashville State Technical Institute.

NSTI or Nashville Tech, as it was generally known, was formed to supply the training needed for positions requiring only the Associate's degree or professional certificates, but also to provide the beginning years of a more advanced technical education. At first, liberal arts offerings were essentially the minimum required for the institution to meet these goals, but the plan was always for NSTI to become a full community college. Nashville State opened in 1970 with an enrollment of 398 students.

As time went by, and liberal arts offerings increased somewhat, the school was used more and more by students who were looking to complete the first two years of a four-year degree at a more affordable cost. Some of these students found that credits earned at NSTI were hard to transfer to other accredited schools outside of the Tennessee Board of Regents system. A revamping of the curriculum was put in place to address this concern, and concurrently the institution was renamed Nashville State Community College, a pattern which had already been established at the other, similar urban technical institutes in the state.

Unlike other community colleges operated by the Tennessee Board of Regents, Nashville State does not conduct any intercollegiate athletics programs. Under the terms of a judicial consent decree, Nashville State must carefully tailor its offerings so as not to be in direct competition for students with Tennessee State University, a historically black university also located in Nashville, which has been ordered by federal court to achieve a higher degree of racial integration.

== Campuses ==
Nashville State offers classes and programs throughout its seven county service area. There are seven campuses offering classes: White Bridge campus (in west Nashville), Clarksville campus (in Montgomery County), East Davidson campus (in Donelson), North Davidson campus (in Madison), Humphreys County campus (in Waverly), Southeast campus (in Antioch), and the Dickson campus (in Dickson County).

=== White Bridge campus ===
The White Bridge campus (Davidson County), sometimes referred to as the main campus, is located at 120 White Bridge Rd, Nashville. The White Bridge campus is home to the college's Heatlhcare professions division, which features: Central Sterile Processing Technology, Nursing, Occupational Therapy, and Surgical Technology. Nashville State offers a robust Information Technology programs, ranging from Coding Bootcamps to stackable technical certificate and Associate of Science and Associate of Applied Science degrees. In addition to a litany of other program offerings, there is a state-of-the-art Music Technology studio and lab. Facilities on the White Bridge campus include classrooms, healthcare simulation rooms, offices, student services, library, two auditoriums for musical performances, events and conferences, a music recording studio, art gallery, and student gathering spots. The Mayfield Library is in the Kisber Building. In partnership with Metro Nashville Public Schools, an Early College is located on campus for high school students.

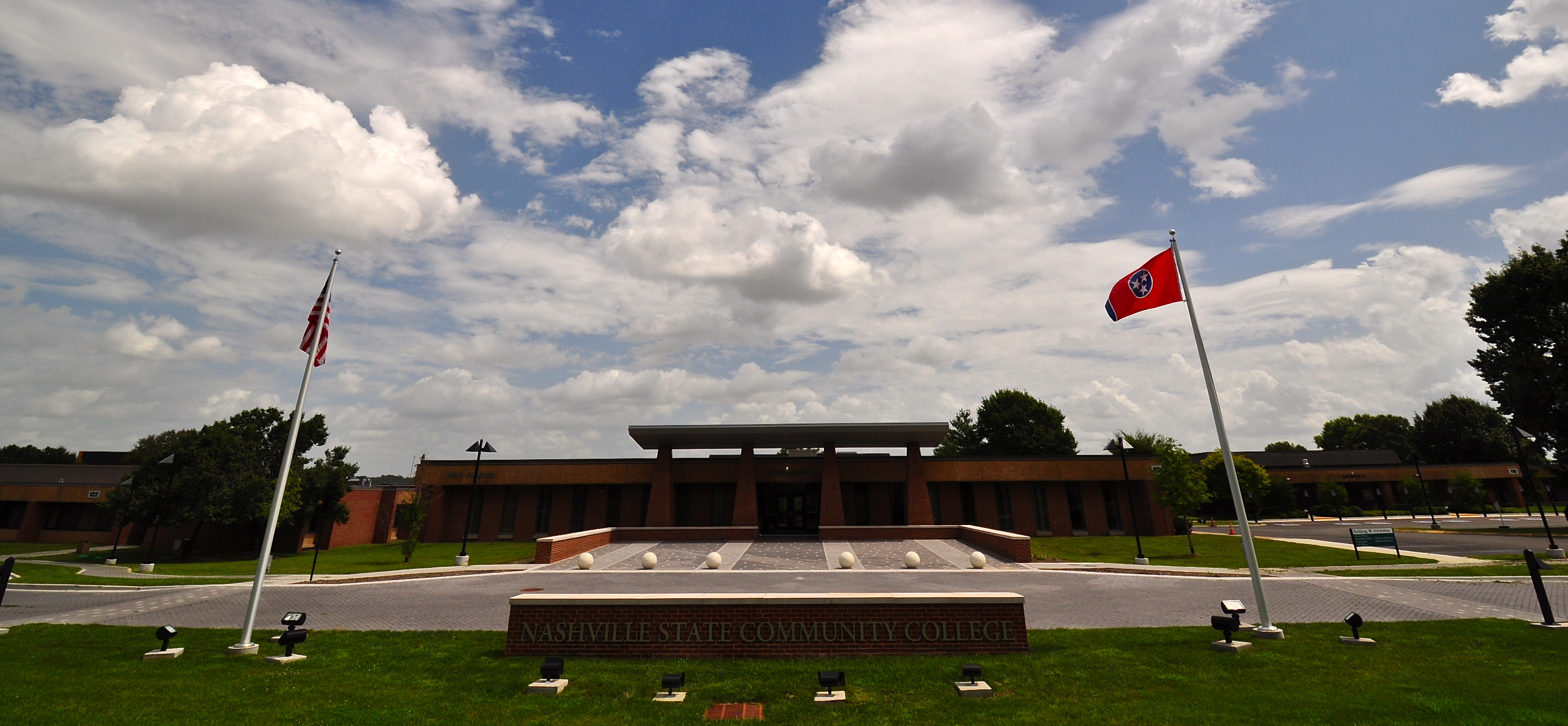
Nashville State Community College - Main Campus, September 2014.

=== Southeast ===
The Southeast campus (Davidson County) is located at 5248 Hickory Hollow Parkway in Nashville. The Southeast campus is home to the Randy Rayburn School of Culinary Arts, with its state-of-the-art kitchen and classrooms and a Hospitality program. It is also home of Nashville State's Law Enforcement Academy. Additionally, Students at the Southeast Campus can take courses applicable toward an Associate of Applied Science, Associate of Arts, or Associate of Science degrees. Students can also enroll ESL classes and College Prep classes.

=== North Davidson ===
To increase accessibility to higher education for Tennesseans, Nashville State has constructed a campus in the northern quadrant of Davidson County. The address is 1520 Gallatin Pike North, Madison. The college broke ground in late June 2020. The campus will be open to the community in late spring 2022, with classes starting in August 2022 for the fall term. The campus layout allows for future growth.

=== East Davidson ===
The East Davidson campus is located at 2845 Elm Hill Pike, Nashville, TN 37214. At present, classes served from this campus are online or virtual.

=== Humphreys County ===
The Humphreys County campus is located at 695 Holly Lane in Waverly. Students at the Humphreys County Campus can take courses applicable toward an Associate of Applied Science in Process Control Technology, General Technology—Options: Business or Technical Concentration, Business Management—Options: Business Administration, Entrepreneurship, Financial Services, and Marketing, as well as the General Education core leading to an Associate of Arts, or Associate of Science degree. The Humphreys County campus also has Industrial Process Control Technology simulation rooms.

=== Dickson ===
The Dickson campus is located at 206 West Walnut Street, in the heart of downtown Dickson. In late 2023, Nashville State, TCAT Dickson, and TriStar Horizon Medical Center announced the pending construction and opening of a Dickson County Center for Higher Education, which will be home to Nashville State’s Dickson campus when it opens. It will be located on Hwy 46, just south of I-40. Students at the Dickson campus can take courses applicable toward an Associate of Applied Science, Associate of Arts, or Associate of Science degrees.

=== Clarksville ===
The Clarksville campus is located at 1760 Wilma Rudolph Blvd. Clarksville, TN 37040. The campus, which will be a community-based Center for Higher Education, is currently undergoing an approximate $35 million renovation and expansion. The campus offers 15 associate degree programs and four technical certificate programs. Nashville State has partnered with Clarksville-Montgomery County School System (CMCSS) and Austin Peay State University on a Teacher Residency Program. This program is available to CMCSS classified employees and graduating seniors, and Montgomery County residents.
