= Tennessee College of Applied Technology - Shelbyville =

- Motto: Workforce Development Its What We Do
- Type: Public Technical College
- Established: March 1964; 62 years ago
- President: Jimmy Wright
- Vice-president: Lisa Sanders
- Faculty: 40
- Students: 600
- Location: 2905 US 231 North, Shelbyville, Tennessee, 37160, United States; 35.569594°N 86.445317°W
- Campus: Suburban; 20 acres (0.081 km^{2})
- Colors: Blue & red
- Website: http://www.tcatshelbyville.edu

The Tennessee College of Applied Technology - Shelbyville or TCAT Shelbyville is a technical school located in Shelbyville, Tennessee. It opened in 1964 and is a part of the Tennessee Colleges of Applied Technology.

== History ==
This institution was authorized by House Bill 633, passed by the Tennessee General Assembly on March 15, 1963, and approved by the Governor on March 22, 1963.

The college was governed by the Tennessee Department of Education until 1983 when control was transferred to the Tennessee Board of Regents by House Bill 697 and Senate Bill 746.

Located on a 20-acre (81,000 m^{2}) tract of land at 1405 Madison Street (U.S. Highway 41-A) approximately two miles east of downtown Shelbyville, the college serves individuals from a broad geographical area including but not limited to Bedford, Coffee, Franklin, Lincoln, Marshall, Moore, and Rutherford counties.

The first of its kind to be constructed, TCAT Shelbyville opened its doors on November 30, 1964, for full-time preparatory programs with forty-one students enrolled in six programs (Air Conditioning/Refrigeration, Auto Mechanics, Drafting, Industrial Electricity, Machine Shop and Welding).

The Tennessee Technology Center at Shelbyville became the Tennessee College of Applied Technology - Shelbyville on July 1, 2013, under Senate Bill No. 643 House Bill No. 236*. Approval of Public Chapter No. 473.

=== Building expansions ===
In 1981 the school was expanded to give more space for existing programs. In July 1994, the name was changed by the Tennessee Legislature to "Tennessee Technology Center at Shelbyville". The name was again changed July 2013 by Tennessee Legislature to "Tennessee College of Applied Technology - Shelbyville".

Another expansion in 1996 with the addition of approximately 17,700 square feet (1,640 m^{2}) and renovation to the existing building.

The expansion brought the total square footage of the college to approximately 61,250 square feet (5,690 m^{2}). Also included in the expansion was money for the upgrade of equipment in all program and classroom areas.

Renovations in 2008–2009 included monies to update classrooms and to renovate the lobby and all hallways.

Plans are to expand the school to Winchester, Tennessee in a new 30,000 square feet (2,800 m^{2}) building, expand the Information Technology and Infrastructure Management program to Spot Lowe in Lewisburg, TN and to Lincoln County schools in August 2019. In 2020, the college will start an Airframe and Powerplant program in Winchester.

Remote campuses were added in Winchester, Tullahoma, Fayetteville, Lewisburg and Shelbyville, Tennessee.

== Academics ==
Each of the Tennessee Colleges of Applied Technology offers programs based on geographic needs of businesses and industry. Therefore, each college can have different academic programs and offerings. The Tennessee College of Applied Technology - Shelbyville offers Certificates and Diplomas in the following programs: In January 1965, evening programs (part-time) were opened.

- Automotive Technology
- Computer Aided Design Technology
- HVAC/R (Heating, Ventilation, Air Conditioning, Refrigeration)
- Information Technology and Infrastructure Management
- Industrial Electricity
- Industrial Maintenance Automation
- Machine Tool Technology
- Practical Nursing
- Truck Driving
- Welding

The college offers supplemental programs based on business, industry and public demand. These classes include Computer Technology, Leadership, Office Occupations, Industrial (Electricity, Machine Tool, Industrial Maintenance) or can be customized to meet client needs.

Beginning in July 2000 the college began delivering professional testing through Prometric. This testing allows for career based testing. The college began delivering professional exams through Pearson VUE in 2007 allowing for additional delivery of career based testing expanding its services to allow professional certifications and higher-education exams. During this same year, the college began using Certiport and COMPASS as additional ways to achieve certifications and qualification based testing.

Beginning in January 2014, the Industrial Maintenance program expanded to a campus in Winchester, Tennessee. The Medical Assistant program also opened at a remote campus on the west side of Shelbyville.

In August 2015, the college expanded to Lewisburg, Shelbyville (MTEC Building) and Tullahoma, Tennessee with the Industrial Maintenance Program. The Computer Information Technology program also expanded to the MTEC Building in August.

In 2017 construction on a new building in Winchester, Tennessee will begin and will provide classrooms for Information Technology and Infrastructure Management, Machine Tool Technology, Industrial Maintenance, Welding, CNA and Nursing.

Beginning August 1, 2017, the CIT program became the Information Technology and Infrastructure Management Program.

== Student organizations ==
TCAT Shelbyville provides memberships and organizations for students.

SkillsUSA

National Technical Honor Society

Student Government Association

== Technical Blog, Web 2.0 and Cloud Services ==
The Tennessee College of Applied Technology - Shelbyville began a technical blog in September 2007 to supplement programs and focus on new technologies. TCAT Shelbyville Technical Blog's readership grew to over 3.6 million by mid 2019 and has a global following.

In 2010 the information technology department implemented the Tennessee College of Applied Technology - Shelbyville Learning Management System. This LMS Cloud array is used to supplement classes with Moodle Learning Management System Servers, Nida Servers, streaming video, online classes, Microsoft SharePoint Services, medical education, file sharing and collaboration. Currently TCAT Shelbyville is the only institution with a comprehensive online learning center.

Beginning August 2011, TCAT Shelbyville became the first institution to offer online through their on campus LMS cloud servers.

Beginning in 2012 the Industrial Maintenance department implemented a web-based SCADA curriculum. This curriculum uses the physical hardware in the cloud combining and integrating the existing curriculum of programmable logic controllers (PLCs), Robotics, touchscreens along with industrial high speed cameras and other hardware on campus. The Program became one of the first classrooms in the TBR system allowing the integration of cloud based SCADA/PLC systems with an on ground industrial training environment.

In May 2012 the CIT program moved live hardware into the cloud for live hands on. This move became one of the first higher education live hardware projects in the cloud presenting CIT students IaaS (infrastructure as a service) cloud computing to practice configuring servers, network devices and other advanced hardware from anywhere in the world.

In September 2013 TCAT Shelbyville expanded their cloud services to include file sharing for instructors and students.

== Professional memberships ==
- Air Conditioning Contractors of America
- American Design and Drafting Association
- American Digital Design Association
- American Technical Educators Association
- American Welding Society
- Automotive Service Excellence
- CompTIA
- HVAC Excellence
- Microsoft
- National League for Nursing
- National Association of Publicly Funded Truck Driving Schools
- National Center for Women of Information Technology
- National Association of Student Financial Aid Administrators
- National League of Nursing
- Precision Metalforming Association
- Professional Truck Driving Institute (PTDI)
- Shelbyville/Bedford County Chamber of Commerce
- SkillsUSA
- Southern Association of Student Financial Aid Administrators
- Tennessee Business Education Association
- Tennessee State Board of Dentistry
- Tennessee State Board of Nursing
- Tennessee State Board of Vocational Education

== Accreditation ==
The Tennessee College of Applied Technology - Shelbyville is accredited by the Council of Occupational Education (COE). The Council on Occupational Education (COE), is a national accrediting agency which was originally established in 1971 as a regional agency under the Southern Association of Colleges and Schools.

== See also ==
- List of colleges and universities in Tennessee
