= Bolivar College =

Women's school in Madisonville, Tennessee

- Former names: Bolivar Academy; Bolivar Boys Academy; Bolivar Female Academy
- Type: Private
- Active: 1825–December 1907
- Founder: Rev. Creed Fulton
- Location: Madisonville, Tennessee, United States

Bolivar College was a private preparatory school and college in Madisonville, Tennessee. It was established by Rev. Creed Fulton, a founder of Emory and Henry College in Virginia. It opened in 1825 as the Bolivar Academy and became a college in the 1890s. It closed in December 1907.

== History ==
=== Bolivar Male Academy ===
Bolivar Academy for boys was formed in Madisonville, Tennessee in 1825. It was established by Rev. Creed Fulton, a founder of Emory and Henry College in Virginia. At that time, the state of Tennessee made appropriations to fund schools in counties locales. Its principal was Calvin Jones in 1834.

=== Bolivar Female Academy ===
The first class of female students started as the Female Department of Bolivar Academy on June 17, 1850. Fulton selected Miss Longake to oversee the female academy. It was managed by Miss C. M. Melville of New England from 1850 to 1854. Professor Samuel M. Gaines was the school's principal after Melville. The female academy had more than sixty students in 1858. By 1860, it was called the Bolivar Female Academy and S. M. Gaines was its principal. Professor R. H. Ramsey was its principal for five years, from 1866 through June 1871.

=== Bolivar College ===
Bolivar Academy was reorganized as Bolivar College in the 1890s. However, it continued to be commonly referred to at Bolivar Academy. A new building was added to its campus when it became a college. In 1895, the college had fifty students and four instructors. Rev. T. R. Waggoner was its principal from 1900 to 1902. He was replaced by Professor W. L. Wallace in January 1902, who was supported by his wife teacher Linne Parue Wallace. Under his leadership, the school was at maximum enrollment in February. Its enrollment was 100 students in February 1904.

In January 1907, the Nashville Banner and the Knoxville Sentinel newspapers ran announcements that the Bolivar Academy property was for sale or lease. However, its high school division was still open for the February and September 1907 terms. In January 1908, the Bolivar Academy trustees deeded its building and grounds to Monroe County for its first public high school. At the time, the Bolivar property was worth $10,000 ($358,333 in 2022 money).

== Campus ==
Bolivar College consisted of three buildings. The Bolivar Male Academy was located on the east side of Madisonville in a brick structure. The male academy did not have desks; its students sat on backless benches. The Bolivar Female Academy was in a building that was later the home of Dr. G. O. Bicknell. A third building was added when the academy became a college; this building that was later the Monroe County high school.

== Academics ==
In 1856, the Female Division course of study included ancient and modern history, arithmetic, astronomy, botany, chemistry, composition, elocution, French, geography, geology, geometry, German, grammar, Greek, Latin, logic, moral and natural philosophy, physiology, reading, rhetoric, Spanish, trigonometry, and writing. However, the division's main focus was composition, reading, and spelling. Music, piano, or guitar lessons were offered for an additional fee.

== See also ==
- List of women's universities and colleges in the United States
- List of colleges and universities in Tennessee
