= Fayette County Civic and Welfare League =

The Fayette County Civic and Welfare League was established in 1959 in order to advocate for equal voting rights for the African American community in Fayette County, Tennessee. Through a rigorous voter registration drive, local African Americans were able to change the political climate of the county and gain national attention for the work toward equality during the 1950s-1960s era of the Civil Rights Movement

== Background ==
Through various Jim Crow laws and Tennessee state legislature laws, African Americans were never given equal opportunity to vote, as was common among the Southern states in the US before the later 1960s. From the 1860s on, African Americans were the majority race in the county, but poll taxes, literacy tests, state constitution comprehension, and white supremacists intimidation perpetuated the cycle of suppressing their vote. Being a rural county in the South, the particular problem posed were the farming tenants on White owned land; those who registered to vote were usually subsequently fired or threatened with eviction if they did not take their names off the registrar.

Gaining national attention from The New York Times, James Forman, from the Emergency Relief Committee of Chicago's Congress on Racial Equality, and John Doar, an attorney at the Justice Department for President Eisenhower's and President Kennedy's administrations began to speak up. Fayette County began their own advocacy, cultivating leaders such as John McFerren and Viola Harris McFerren, Harpman and Minnie Jameson, Square and Wilola Mormon, Reverend June Dowdy and many others.

Nationally, there were numerous legal cases taking place that continued to fight for equal voting rights under the 15th Amendment. The 1957 Civil Rights Act was not as effective as it needed to be, but it was a foundational step in the federal government enforcing equality. This established the Civil Rights Commission that began heavily researching civil rights violations throughout the country, particularly in voting registration and intimidation. The 1960 Civil Rights Act ensured that there was outside oversight regarding voter registration and impeded interracial violence.

In 1959 there was a county famous murder trial of Burton Dodson. James F. Estes was an African American attorney from Memphis who took to the defense of Dodson. The obvious absence of any African American jurors pointed blankly to the disenfranchisement in the county. Through this disparity, Estes was able to connect Dodson's murder case to advocating for the African American right to vote. The Civil Rights Commission received hundreds of complaints about not being allowed to vote throughout the decade and this murder case became the final straw. Despite testimony from a deputy practically exonerating Dodson of the murder of a White deputy almost 20 years earlier, the White jury found him guilty.

== Fayette County Civic and Welfare League (FCCWL) ==
This verdict drove John McFerren, Harpman Jameson, Rufus Abernathy, Ed Brooks, Roy Brown, Isiah Harris, John Lewis, Houston Malone, William S. Towles Sr., and Levearn Towles to form the Fayette County Civic and Welfare League, Incorporated. Through the assistance of Estes, they filed a charter to be incorporated with the state office in Nashville, but not Fayette County. Their stated purpose was, “to promote civil and political and economic welfare for the community progress of Fayette County.” Due to Estes’ connections with Dodson and the newly founded FCCWL, he helped others found the Haywood County Civic and Welfare League, headed by other members of Dodson's family.

The organization's first action was an intense voter registration drive the summer of 1959. With the Democratic Party county primary in August, Whites continued to blatantly disregard federal law and continued to exclude African Americans from voting. In November, a federal lawsuit was filed against the Fayette County Democratic Executive Committee; ultimately ending with Deputy US Attorney General Lawrence E. Walsh announcing the entry of a consent judgement to end voter discrimination. This case became the first to end in negotiation under the 1957 Civil Rights Act.

Despite all of this progress, there was still significant discrimination and harassment from Whites throughout the county. Starting in April 1960, the White Citizen's Council began systematically targeting prominent civil rights leaders in the community, leading to a heated boycott on both sides. This primarily hurt African Americans more than the Whites, prompting the Nashville NAACP to launch a nationwide food, clothing, and economic drive to support those in Fayette County. The Red Cross was also asked to support those who were driven out of their homes and off their sharecropped land; national support was met with outrage by Whites who did not believe there was a problem in their county.

== Tent City ==
Because Fayette County was predominantly farming and rural, most African Americans were dependent upon their sharecropping businesses with White landowners. However, most were willing to risk that for their voice to be heard in the US democratic process. This led to thousands being evicted from their farms and left without homes. Tent City started with eight families being forced from their homes and setting up camp on land owned by African American landowner Shephard Toweles. Utilizing army tents, the evictees kept flooding to this new community.

Amongst all of this, in the November election, with 1,200 African American new voters registered, along with previous voters turned the county Republican for the first time in almost a century. They also elected Democrat Estes Kefauver to the Senate, which was nationally perceived that African Americans would support those who helped them gain the right to vote. In December 1960, the US Justice Department began taking major steps in stopping the evictions and ending the boycott against African Americans in Fayette County. Holding true to his promise, Kefauver brought the Red Cross to his county to assist already evicted African Americans. Many other organizations flooded the county with aid and when President Kennedy was elected to the Oval Office he ordered the Secretary of Agriculture to send surplus food to the African American community. Unfortunately, it was blocked by White supremacists in the county.

== Later ==
Due to internal conflicts and the fact that the FCCWL was not registered with Fayette County, McFerren started another organization called the Original Fayette County Civic and Welfare League (OFCCWL). It continued to do most of the same work in the area, gradually bringing more equality. Finally, in July 1962, a consent decree was filed in Memphis that ended all pending lawsuits and stated that any evictions based on voter registration were unconstitutional. Voter registration was still heavily pushed throughout the county, well into 1962; the passing of the Civil Rights Act of 1964 dramatically changed the course of civil rights advocacy in the country. The OFCCWL led the fight to desegregate schools in 1966, in 1965 the US Congress passed the 1965 Voting Rights Act, and in 1966 the first African American men and women were elected to the Fayette County Quarterly Court. In 1971 the Tennessee Committee on the United States Commission on Civil Rights found ten civil rights violations in the county.
