= Tennessee College of Applied Technology - Northwest =

Coordinates: 36.1200°N 89.2574°W

- Former names: Tennessee Technology Center, Tennessee College of Applied Technology-Newbern
- Motto: Workforce Development - It's What We Do
- Type: Public Technical College
- Established: 1965
- Director: Youlanda Jones
- Academic staff: 34
- Students: 275
- Address: 340 Washington Street, Newbern, Tennessee, United States
- Campus: Rural
- Colors: Blue and Red
- Website: www.tcatnorthwest.edu
- High Skill, High Wage, High Demand Careers

The Tennessee College of Applied Technology - Northwest or TCAT Northwest is a technical school located in Newbern, Tennessee. It is a part of the Tennessee Colleges of Applied Technology.

== History ==
In 1963, the Tennessee General Assembly directed the State Board for Vocational Education to locate, establish, construct, and operate a statewide system of area vocational-technical schools. The intent of this legislation was to meet more adequately the occupational training needs of citizens and residents of this state, including employees and future employees of existing and prospective industries and businesses.

In July 1994, a name change was passed by the legislature, and the Area Schools became the Tennessee Technology Centers to better reflect the trend toward the more advanced, technological training needed to supply skilled employees.

On July 1, 2013, Governor Bill Haslam signed Senate Bill SB0643 officially renaming all statewide technology centers to the Tennessee Colleges of Applied Technology.

The Tennessee College of Applied Technology-Northwest is a post-secondary and adult institution which provides programs to serve the training needs of a broad geographic area by providing technical instruction and skilled training in trade, technical, and other occupations. The instructional programs are designed to prepare persons for employment and to upgrade the skills and knowledge of persons who have already entered the work force.

== Academics ==
Each of the Tennessee Colleges of Applied Technology offers programs based on geographic needs of businesses and industry. Therefore, each college can have different academic programs and offerings. The following academic programs are available at TCAT-Northwest.

- Automotive Technology
- Drafting/CAD
- Electronics Technology
- Heating, Ventilation, Air Conditioning/Refrigeration (HVAC/R)
- Industrial Maintenance/Mechatronics
- Machine tool Technology
- Practical Nursing
- Welding Technology
- Cosmetology
- Truck Driving
- Diesel Powered Equipment Technology
- Injection Molding/Robotics

== Student organizations ==
The Tennessee College of Applied Technology-Northwest provides memberships and organizations for students, including the following:

- SkillsUSA
- National Technical Honor Society
- Student Government Association

== Accreditation ==
The Tennessee College of Applied Technology-Northwest is accredited by the Council of Occupational Education (COE), a regional accrediting agency of the Southern Association of Colleges and Schools (SACS).
