= Tennessee College of Applied Technology - Crump =

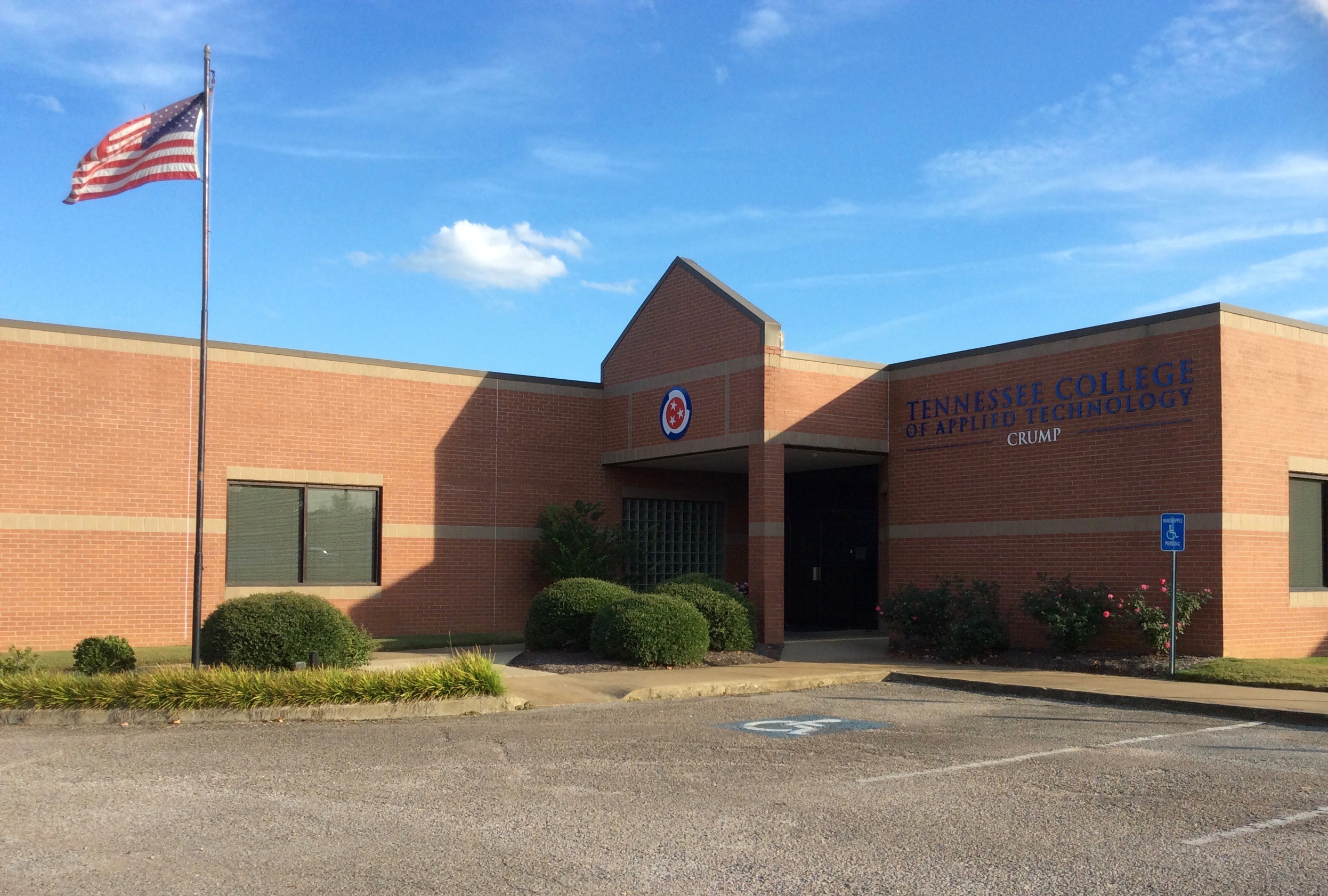
- The administration building for TCAT Crump
- Motto: Workforce Development - Its What We Do!
- Type: Public technical college
- Established: 1965
- Director: Dr. Arrita W. Summers
- Academic staff: 13
- Students: 243
- Location: 3070 Hwy 64, Crump, Tennessee, 38327, United States; 35.2212°N 88.3191°W
- Campus: Suburban; 10 acres (0.040 km^{2})
- Colors: Blue & red
- Website: www.tcatcrump.edu
- High skill, high wage, high demand careers

The Tennessee College of Applied Technology Crump or TCAT Crump is a technical school located in Crump, Tennessee. It is part of the Tennessee Colleges of Applied Technology.

== History ==
In 2024, the campus was expanded with a new $12.9 million building for the Farming Operations Technology program.

== Accreditation ==
The Tennessee College of Applied Technology - Crump is accredited by the Council of Occupational Education (COE). The Council on Occupational Education (COE), is a regional accrediting agency of the Southern Association of Colleges and Schools.

== Academics ==
Each of the Tennessee Colleges of Applied Technology offers programs based on geographic needs of businesses and industry. Therefore, each college has different academic programs and offerings based on their in their service area. The Tennessee College of Applied Technology - Crump offers Certificates and Diplomas in the following programs:

- Administrative Office Technology
- Collision Repair Technology
- Computer Information Systems (CIS)
- Computer Information Technician (CIT)
- Computerized Graphics Design
- Drafting & CAD Technology
- Electronics Technology
- Health Information Technology
- Heating, Ventilation, Air Conditioning, & Refrigeration
- Industrial Electricity
- Industrial Maintenance
- Machine Tool Technology
- Practical Nursing
- Technology Foundations
- Welding Technology

== See also ==
- List of colleges and universities in Tennessee
