= Tennessee College of Applied Technology, Morristown =

Public technical college in Morristown, Tennessee

Tennessee College of Applied Technology Morristown
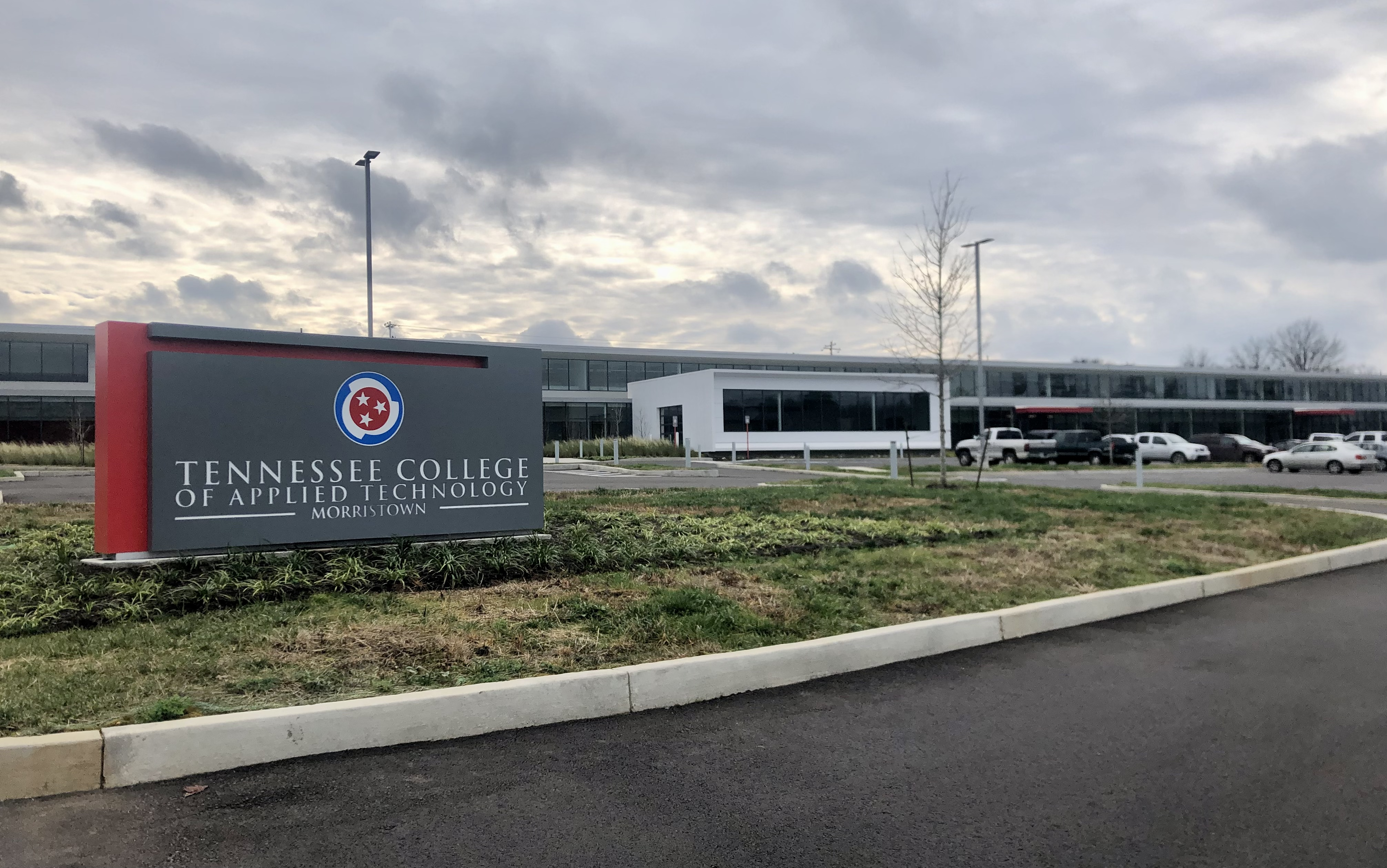
- TCAT Morristown's Advanced Manufacturing Building
- Motto: We Build Careers
- Type: Public Technical College
- Established: 1966; 59 years ago
- President: Susanne Cox
- Address: 821 West Louise Avenue, Morristown, Tennessee, United States
- Website: tcatmorristown.edu

Tennessee College of Applied Technology Morristown or TCAT Morristown, is a public technical college in the Tennessee Board of Regents' Tennessee Colleges of Applied Technology (TCAT) system located in Morristown, Tennessee, United States.

The college serves nine East Tennessee counties: Claiborne, Cocke, Grainger, Greene, Hamblen, Hancock, Hawkins, Jefferson, and Sevier.

== History ==
With the need of an update because of the rising manufacturing market in Morristown, in late 2019, the college announced a $14 million expansion with the construction of a 45,342 sq ft (4,212.4 m^{2}) advanced manufacturing and mechatronics training facility on the former site of the City of Morristown Public Works Department headquarters, which had relocated to a new facility in West Morristown.

In July 2020, United States Secretary of Labor, Eugene Scalia, visited the college to meet with state and local leaders to highlight economic recovery in manufacturing during the midst of the COVID-19 pandemic.

== Academic programs ==
Each of the Tennessee Colleges of Applied Technology offers programs based on geographic needs of businesses and industry. Therefore, each college can have different academic programs and offerings. TCAT Morristown students have the opportunity to take the following programs:

- Administrative Office Technology
- Automotive Technology
- Aviation Maintenance Technology
- Building Construction Technology
- Collision Repair Technology
- Computer Aided Design Technology
- Computer Information Technology
- Cosmetology
- Digital Graphic Design
- Heating, Ventilation, Air-Conditioning and Refrigeration
- Industrial Electricity
- Industrial Maintenance
- Machine Tool Technology
- Pipefitting and Plumbing Technology
- Practical Nursing
- Truck Driving
- Welding
