= Tennessee College of Applied Technology - Pulaski =

- Motto: Workforce Development Its What We Do
- Type: Public Technical College
- Established: September 15, 1969
- Director: Tony Creecy
- Academic staff: 30
- Students: 203
- Location: 1233 E. College Street, Pulaski, Tennessee, 38478, United States; 35.1913°N 87.0078°W
- Campus: Suburban; 12 acres (0.049 km^{2})
- Colors: Blue & red
- Website: ttcpulaski.edu

The Tennessee College of Applied Technology - Pulaski or TCAT Pulaski is a technical school located in Pulaski, Tennessee. It is a part of the Tennessee Colleges of Applied Technology.

== History ==
In 2024, construction began on a $30 million campus expansion.

== Academic programs ==
Each of the Tennessee Colleges of Applied Technology offers programs based on geographic needs of businesses and industry. Therefore, each college can have different academic programs and offerings. The Tennessee College of Applied Technology - Pulaski offers certificates and diplomas in the following programs:

- Advanced Manufacturing Education
- Business Systems Technology
- Computer Applications
- Computer Operating Systems & Network Technology
- Health Sciences
- Heating, Ventilation, Air Conditioning & Refrigeration
- Industrial Electricity
- Industrial Maintenance Technology
- Industrial Welding Technology
- Residential/Commercial Wiring & Plumbing
- Solar Photovoltaic Technology

== See also ==
- List of colleges and universities in Tennessee
