= National Technical Honor Society =

American vocational student honor society

- NTHS
- Founded: 1984; 42 years ago H. B. Swofford Area Vocational Center
- Type: Honor
- Affiliation: Independent
- Status: Active
- Emphasis: Vocational education
- Scope: International
- Pillars: Career Development, Leadership Development, Service, and Recognition
- Colors: Purple, Silver, and White
- Chapters: 5,200+
- Members: 100,000+ active 1,200,000+ lifetime
- Former name: National Vocational-Technical Honor Society
- Headquarters: 1011 Airport Road; P.O. Box 1336; Flat Rock, North Carolina 28731; United States
- Website: nths.org

The National Technical Honor Society (NTHS) is an international honor society for outstanding career and technical students of workforce vocational education institutions. It was established in 1984. Its initiates attend secondary and post-secondary schools.

== History ==
C. Allen Powell and Jon H. Poteat founded the nonprofit National Vocational-Technical Honor Society at H. B. Swofford Area Vocational Center (now H. B. Swofford Career Center) in Inman, South Carolina in 1984. Its purpose was to reward high school students for their accomplishments, to encourage students to excel, to promote the talents of students to U.S. industries, and to help members understand the U.S. economy. Its executive director was Powell, head of the vocational center. Poteat was a guidance counselor at the school.

The society inducted its first members on March 21, 1985, at the Swoffard Center. That year, the society expanded to all of the vocational schools in Spartenburg County.

In 1997, NTHS began its first scholarship fund, named in honor of co-founder Poteat. In 2003, the NTHS board of directors unanimously agreed to change the name of the organization to the National Technical Honor Society.

As of 2024, it has more than 100,000 active members and 1.2 million initiates. Its initiates attend secondary and post-secondary schools. Some 65,000 students are initiated annually.

== Symbols ==
The society's colors are purple, silver, and white. Its core objectives or pillars are career development, leadership development, service, and recognition.

== Membership ==
Potential members must have a 3.50 GPA, must be in the top ten percent of their class, and need the recommendation of their program director.

== Chapters ==
As of 2024, NTHS serves over 5,200 member schools, both secondary and post-secondary, and has chapters in all fifty states, with chapters expanding into the Bahamas, American Samoa, Puerto Rico, and Guam. The society recognizes outstanding chapters with its Silver Eagle Award for Excellence.

== See also ==
- Professional fraternities and sororities
