= Chattanooga State Community College =

Public college in Chattanooga, Tennessee, US

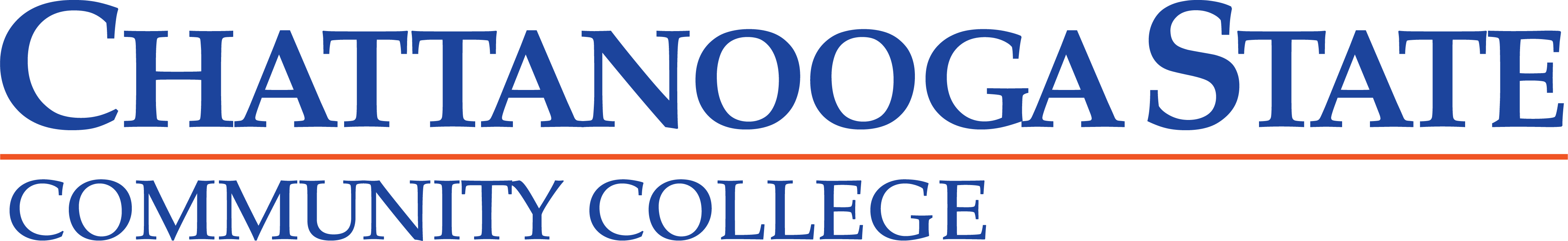
- Motto: A National Leader in Technology
- Type: Public community college
- Established: September 20, 1965
- President: Rebecca Ashford
- Undergraduates: 10,121
- Location: Chattanooga, Tennessee, U.S.
- Campus: Suburban, 150 acres (0.61 km^{2})
- Colors: Blue; Orange
- Nickname: Tigers
- Website: chattanoogastate.edu

Chattanooga State Community College (informally Chatt State) is a public community college in Chattanooga, Tennessee. The college is a member of the Tennessee Board of Regents System and is accredited by the Southern Association of Colleges and Schools (SACS). Athletically, Chattanooga State is a member of Region VII of the NJCAA.

Chattanooga State is the only community college in Tennessee that has a Tennessee College of Applied Technology (TCAT) as an integral part of its organization. The TCAT offers 21 diploma programs and 7 certificate programs with a combined annual enrollment of over 2,300 students and has 1151 employees.

Chattanooga State functions as an open-entry postsecondary institution for students residing in six counties in Southeast Tennessee, as well as seven bordering counties of North Georgia and Northeast Alabama, including Bledsoe, Grundy, Hamilton, Marion, Rhea, and Sequatchie in Tennessee; Catoosa, Dade, Fannin, Murray, Walker, and Whitfield in Georgia; and Jackson in Alabama.

== History ==
In the early 1960s, the Tennessee State Board of Education began efforts to establish community colleges across the state as a result of post-World War II children entering higher education. In September 1965, Chattanooga State became Tennessee's first technical college and Southeast Tennessee's first public institution of higher education. It was originally known as Chattanooga State Technical Institute and was classified as a two-year, coeducational, college-level institution. The college was founded to offer technical programs with Associate in Science and Associate in Engineering degrees, primarily to meet industry needs and "to bridge the gap between engineers and craftsmen."

In 1973, Chattanooga State Technical Institute became Chattanooga State Technical Community College. Specifics of Senate Bill 1010 mandated that the college provide comprehensive one and two-year occupational, college parallel, continuing education, and community service programs; offer quality technical and scientific occupational programs; and serve as a regional technical school to train engineering technicians or technical workers in the fields of production, distribution, and service.

The college was under the State Board of Education until 1974 when it became part of the State Community College and University System, which was later renamed the Tennessee Board of Regents. With that administrative change the college identified the counties in its service area: Hamilton, Rhea, Bledsoe, Sequatchie, Marion, and Grundy counties in Tennessee and border counties in Georgia.

In 1981, the State Area Vocational-Technical School, now known as the Tennessee College of Applied Technology (TCAT), entered into a pilot merger with Chattanooga State Technical Community College. Consequently, the college added vocational education to its mission. In July 1983 the Tennessee legislature officially recognized the merger, creating a unique partnership between vocational and career programs. With this merger the college began offering one-year certificates in fields such as industrial electronics, automotive technology, and welding.

In 2009, the college was renamed Chattanooga State Community College when Senate Bill 681 became law.

Over the years, the college has collaborated with business and industry to achieve several milestones. In 2006 the college acquired the building and land which had been the world headquarters of the portrait photography company, Olan Mills, Inc., which added 59,000 square feet (5,500 m^{2}) and 40 acres (160,000 m^{2}) to the campus, and was renamed the Center for Business, Industry, and Health Professions. The creation of the Volkswagen Academy in 2009 was a unique partnership between the college and Volkswagen - the only such training partnership in over 60 Volkswagen plants worldwide. The establishment of the Business and Community Development Center in downtown Chattanooga provides customized support for start-up companies.

The college has partnered with other cultural and educational organizations to offer collegiate education to particular populations. Hispanic immigrants are prepared for postsecondary study served by the Plaza Communitaria, a program in which the college partnered with the government of Mexico. American displaced workers are served by the AHEAD program. High school students can apply to the Middle College High School, a campus-based school offering both high school and collegiate studies. High school students can also apply to the Early College program, which offers motivated and bright students a chance to finish high school faster and get into college sooner.

== Organization ==
Chattanooga State Community College is governed by the Tennessee Board of Regents (TBR) system, consisting of 18 board members. Debbie Adams served as interim president for Chattanooga State, following Flora Tydings' appointment as chancellor to the Tennessee Board of Regents in 2017. On July 10, 2017, Rebecca S. Ashford was named the president of Chattanooga State.

Tydings replaced James Catanzaro, who had served as president of CSCC from 1990 to 2014. Warren Nichols and Fannie Hewlett were appointed interim president during the search period prior to the appointment of Tydings.

== Administration ==
Chattanooga State Community College

- Rebecca S. Ashford (President 2017 to present)
- Debbie Adams (interim president 2017)
- Flora Tydings (president 2015–2017)
- Fannie Hewlett (interim president 2015)
- Warren Nichols (interim president 2015)

Chattanooga State Technical Community College/Chattanooga State Community College

- James Catanzaro (president 1990–2014)
- Henry Wagner (president 1987–1990)
- Charles S. Branch (president 1973–1987)

Chattanooga State Technical Institute

- Edgar H. Sessions (Director 1967–1973)
- Charles Whitehead (Director 1965–1967)

== Academics ==
Chattanooga State Community College has seven academic departments:

- Business and Information Technologies
- Engineering Technology
- Humanities and Fine Arts
- Math and Sciences
- Nursing and Allied Health
- Social and Behavioral Sciences
- Tennessee College of Applied Technology

== Student life ==
The Student Life department provides extracurricular activities that address various interest groups on campus. Activities, workshops, trips, and events provide students with leadership opportunities, social development, and interaction with various aspects of the campus culture. Students often refer to Chattanooga State as "Chatt State."

== Athletics ==
Chattanooga State competes in Region VII of the National Junior College Athletic Association. Intercollegiate athletics include baseball, men's and women's basketball, and fast pitch softball. Teams routinely compete for national championships. Scholarship opportunities enable qualified student athletes to pursue an education while representing Chattanooga State in a variety of sports. During the 2007 season all four head coaches received "Coach of the Year" conference honors.

=== Baseball ===
During the 2009–2010 season the team competed in the NJCAA baseball world series. Tiger baseball opened the 2010–2011 season with a Region 7 Tournament win and a trip to Grand Junction, Colorado, as one of ten teams in the country to compete in the JUCO World Series. Tiger baseball has produced student athletes with awards both on the field and in the classroom.

=== Basketball ===
Chattanooga State's men's and women's basketball teams under the direction of Head Coach Jay Price have consistently received national recognition. In 2010 Coach Price was named men's basketball coach of the year by the Tennessee Community College Athletic Association. In 2011 both the men's and women's teams won the NJCAA Region 7 championships. Tiger basketball gives students an avenue for pursuing their education at four-year colleges after two years at Chattanooga State.

=== Softball ===
In 2012, Chattanooga State's Lady Tigers softball team won the NJCAA Division I national championship. In 2010, eight Tiger softball players earned all conference academic honors and four team members earned All Academic NFCA Scholar honors. The team won the regional tournament and went to the national tournament for the 16th time. Head coach Beth Keylon-Randolph was former co-head coach of Team USA at the World University games. The 2009 team was ranked #1 in April 2009 and finished the year ranked #4 with a 60–9 record. The Lady Tigers softball team also gives players opportunities to receive athletic scholarships from four-year institutions across the country.

== Locations ==
There are three official sites where classes are offered, one of which is in Chattanooga:

- The Main (Amnicola) Campus, including the Wacker Institute, is located on Amnicola Highway northeast of downtown Chattanooga.

Two additional sites are located in surrounding Tennessee counties:

- the Dayton site, located in Rhea County;
- the Kimball site, located in Marion County.

=== Main (Amnicola) Campus ===
The main campus of Chattanooga State is located 6 miles (9.7 km) from downtown Chattanooga on Amnicola Highway, which lends its name to the commonly known moniker of Amnicola Campus. The college adjoins the Tennessee Riverwalk, which follows the banks of the Tennessee River from the Chickamauga Dam to Ross's Landing in downtown Chattanooga. The main campus consists of 13 buildings on 150 acres (0.61 km^{2}). This campus increased by more than 20 acres (81,000 m^{2}) when the college officially acquired the Olan Mills facility in June 2011. Sculptures by artists-in-residence (such as John Henry), internationally known sculptors, faculty, and students are displayed throughout the campus and in the Outdoor Museum of Art.

An amphitheater is situated in the center of campus and is the hub of student life and informal entertainment. The theatre in the C. C. Bond Humanities Building is the location for many productions by the college's Professional Actor Training Program and music department.

The Augusta R. Kolwyck Library in the Learning Resource Center provides services to students at all locations.

The following facilities are introduced both through the Chattanooga State Achievement Book and the Virtual Tour on the college's website:

- C. C. Bond Humanities Building, named for C. C. Bond, a local African-American educator and principal of Howard School from 1956 to 1964;
- Tennessee College of Applied Technology Complex (3 buildings);
- Learning Resource Center (LRC);
- Center for Business, Industry & Health Professions (CBIH), originally the site of the Olan Mills Portrait Studios corporate headquarters;
- Health Science Center, "103,000-square-foot building with state-of-the-art equipment and labs" opened in 2009;
- Athletic Field House, completed in 2010 with offices, meeting rooms, weight room, and lockers;
- Media Technology Center, formerly the public television station now housing radio and television labs;
- Albright Omniplex, named for Tennessee State Senator Ray Albright, a 17-year veteran of the state legislature who sponsored the bill that changed the college from an area vocational school to a technical community college;
- Charles W. Branch Center for Advanced Technology, named for a former college president and established as a center for automation training;
- Health and Fitness Center, housing the gym, aerobics, weight room, and intramural activities;
- Paul M. Starnes Student Center, named for a Chattanooga educator and Tennessee legislator;
- Center for Engineering Technology, Art, and Science.

=== Off-campus sites ===
==== Dayton Site ====
The Dayton site is located about 40 miles (64 km) north of the Amnicola campus in Dayton, Tennessee. Students at the Dayton location can take the General Education core for most majors as well as selected career courses.

==== Kimball Site ====
The Kimball site is located about 35 miles (56 km) west of the Amnicola campus in Kimball, Tennessee. Students at the Kimball location can take courses applicable toward the A.A., A.S., and A.A.S degrees. They can also enroll in two certificate programs: Cosmetology; Air Conditioning and Refrigeration.

=== College and Industry/STEM School Collaborations ===
==== Volkswagen Academy ====
In the fall of 2012, a new car mechatronics program was initiated at the Volkswagen Academy. The Volkswagen Academy consists of five training centers: the Apprentice Center, the Automation Center, Automotive Center, the Lean Center, and the Conference Center. The Volkswagen Academy is located about nine miles (14 km) east of the Amnicola campus, adjoining the VW assembly plant.

==== Wacker Institute ====
Wacker Chemical has partnered with Chattanooga State to create the Wacker Institute located on the Amnicola campus. The company has its world headquarters in Germany and has built a number of facilities in the United States, including Bradley County in southeast Tennessee. The new plant will manufacture polysilicone which is used in solar-power cells. The Wacker Institute is under the direction of the Engineering Technology division and will focus on teaching workers the technical skills needed to work at the plant, which is scheduled to begin production in 2013. Four tracks of study are being offered: process technician (Operator), Laboratory Technician (Analytics), Electronics & Instrumentation Technician, and Mechanical Technician.

In the summer of 2011, the Wacker Institute and other engineering technology programs opened in the Center for Engineering Technology, Art and Science. The new 149,000-square-foot (13,800 m^{2}) facility features a $3 million, 25,000-square-foot (2,300 m^{2}) state-of-the-art chemical training plant underwritten by Wacker. Additional work force training partnerships have already been developed by the college with companies such as Volkswagen, Alstom, and TVA.

==== STEM School ====
In the fall of 2012, the Hamilton County Department of Education, in cooperation with the Southeast Tennessee STEM Initiative and with Chattanooga State, opened the first Hamilton County Science, Technology, Engineering, and Math High School on the Chattanooga State campus. A grant from the Tennessee STEM Initiative Network and money from other interested parties funded the school. Chattanooga State provided a funding for the school in the back of the Wacker Institute.

== Notable alumni ==
- Maci Bookout
- Kim Hixson
- Thom Tillis
- James Wade
