= Dyersburg State Community College =

Public college in Dyersburg, Tennessee, US

Coordinates: 36.04841°N 89.38992°W

- Type: Public community college
- Established: 1969
- Parent institution: Tennessee Board of Regents
- President: Scott Cook
- Location: Dyersburg, Tennessee, U.S.
- Colors: Navy & Red
- Nickname: Eagles
- Website: dscc.edu

Dyersburg State Community College is a public community college in Dyersburg, Tennessee. It was founded in 1969 and serves nine counties in West Tennessee: Crockett, Dyer, Haywood, Henry, Lake, Lauderdale, Obion, Tipton, and Weakley Counties. Dyersburg State is governed by the Tennessee Board of Regents.

== History ==
Dyersburg was chosen by the Tennessee State Board of Education in 1967 as the location for the second community college in western Tennessee. It was part of the state's response to the 1957 Pierce-Albright report to the state's Legislative Council, which led to a goal to place a postsecondary institution within 50 miles of every Tennessee resident. Classes began in 1969 and its first graduates completed degrees in 1971. Its center in Trenton, the Gibson County Center, first offered classes in 1991 and the Jimmy Naifeh Center in Covington was founded in 1992. At its September 2022 board meeting, the Tennessee Board or Regents approved a change in Dyersburg State Community College’s service area, adding Crockett, Haywood, Henry, and Weakley Counties, effective July 1, 2023. As a result, the Gibson County Center in Trenton, TN, was transferred to Jackson State Community College and Dyersburg State’s Henry County Center in Paris opened July 1.

=== Presidents ===
- E. B. Eller (December 1968-June 1981)
- Carl Christian Andersen (July 1981-November 1984)
- Karen A. Bowyer (November 1984-December 2021)
- Scott Cook (January 2022-Present)

Presidents Eller and Bowyer were awarded President Emeritus status at retirement.

== Academics ==
Classes are held on the 100-acre campus in Dyersburg and at centers in Covington and Paris. The college offers Associate of Science, Associate of Arts, and Associate of Applied Science degrees as well as technical and academic certificates. Dyersburg State Community College serves nine counties adjacent to or near the Mississippi River in West Tennessee. Dyersburg State’s current Chief Academic Officer is Amy Johnson, Vice President for Academic Affairs and Student Success. The college is accredited by the Southern Association of Colleges and Schools and is an open-admissions institution.
