= Jackson State Community College =

Public college in Jackson, Tennessee, US

- Type: Public community college
- Established: 1967; 59 years ago
- Parent institution: Tennessee Board of Regents
- President: Carol A. Rothstein
- Location: Jackson, Tennessee, U.S. 35.645°N 88.781°W
- Colors: Green & Gold
- Nickname: Green Jays
- Website: www.jscc.edu

Jackson State Community College is a public community college in Jackson, Tennessee. It is governed by the Tennessee Board of Regents and offers associate degrees in arts, science, and applied science programs.

Jackson State has branch campuses in Lexington, Tennessee, Savannah, Tennessee, and Trenton, Tennessee. It is also home to six sports teams: Men's Basketball, Women's Basketball, Women's Volleyball, Men's Cross Country, Baseball, and Softball.

== History ==
Jackson State's first president was F.E. Wright, who served from 1967 until his death in 1976. Walter L. Nelms was president of the college for 21 years, until his retirement in 1997. He was succeeded by Charlie Delmer Roberts Jr., who served at Jackson State until 2004, when Bruce Blanding became the college's fourth president. Blanding served until 2016 and was followed by Interim President Horace Chase, who served until December 2016, when Allana R. Hamilton was appointed as the fifth president of the college. Hamilton took office on January 10, 2017. Hamilton served as president until 2019, when she was appointed as Vice President of Academic Affairs for the Tennessee Board of Regents. Jeff Sisk was appointed as interim president until June 2, 2020. George J. Pimentel was appointed as the sixth president of the college in June 2020 during the COVID-19 pandemic. Pimentel served as president until his retirement in June 2023. Kimberly McCormick was appointed as interim president on July 1, 2023, while the college searched for its seventh president. On August 15, 2023, the Tennessee Board of Regents unanimously confirmed Carol A. Rothstein as seventh president beginning October 1, 2023.

== Notable alumni ==
- Viola Harris Mcferren (1931–2013) became a civil rights activist.
