= Columbia State Community College =

College in Columbia, Tennessee, U.S.

- Type: Public community college
- Established: 1966
- Affiliations: National Junior College Athletic Association
- Endowment: $707,627
- President: Janet F. Smith
- Faculty: 362 (112 full-time)
- Students: 5,437
- Location: Columbia, Tennessee, United States; 35°36′59″N 87°05′59″W
- Colors: Green; White
- Mascot: Chargers
- Website: columbiastate.edu

Columbia State Community College is a public community college in Columbia, Tennessee. Founded in 1966, it serves nine counties in southern Middle Tennessee through five campuses. It is accredited by the Southern Association of Colleges and Schools Commission on Colleges to award Associate of Arts, Associate of Science, Associate of Science in Teaching, Associate of Fine Arts, and Associate of Applied Science degrees, and technical certificates.

== Academics ==
Columbia State grants Associate of Arts, Associate of Science, Associate of Science in Teaching, Associate of Fine Arts, and Associate of Applied Science degrees, and technical certificates.

The college is organized into the following academic divisions: Health Sciences; Humanities and Social Sciences; and Science, Technology & Mathematics. The college offers more than 70 programs of study.

== Transfer information ==
Students entering a community college in Tennessee who select a major within the Tennessee Transfer Pathways complete required courses and earn an associate degree can transition seamlessly as a junior to any Tennessee public university, or at participating Tennessee independent college and/or university. All earned credit hours will apply toward a bachelor's degree in the same discipline.

Columbia State has partnerships with area universities to offer bachelor's and master's degree programs on a Columbia State campus. The schools and programs offered are:

- Middle Tennessee State University
  - Bachelor's degree in Agribusiness
  - Bachelor's degree in Interdisciplinary Studies (K-6)
  - Master's degree in Education
  - Education Specialist, Ed.S.
- Tennessee Technological University
  - Bachelor's degree in Interdisciplinary Studies

== Students and faculty ==
The average student age is 22.4 years old. In Fall 2018, 60% of students were female. The number of students enrolled in Fall 2018 was 6,221. The college employs more than 520 people, consisting of 362 faculty members.

=== Demographics ===
- 81% Caucasian
- 7% African-American
- 6% Hispanic
- 2% Asian American or Pacific Islander
- 0.09% Native American

== Sports, clubs, and traditions ==
The school is a TCCAA and National Junior College Athletic Association (NJCAA) member and fields baseball/softball, women's soccer, and men's and women's basketball teams in intercollegiate competition. Scholarships are offered for those sports.

The men's basketball team won the 2015 TCCAA championship and have competed in the 2012, 2014 and 2015 NJCAA Men's National Basketball Tournament. The baseball team was named the 2012 TCCAA champions, 2011 and 2013 NJCAA Region VII champions and has competed in the NJCAA Junior College Baseball World Series 13 times, most recently in 2014.

Columbia State also offers intramural sports in basketball, flag football, ultimate frisbee and more.

Columbia State has a variety of student groups including the Student Government Association, President's Leadership Society, Charger Student Radiographer Organization, North American Veterinary Technician Association, Phi Theta Kappa, Respiratory Care Crew, Sigma Kappa Delta, Student Nursing Association, the STEM Club, study abroad, and more.
