= Cleveland State Community College =

Public college in Cleveland, Tennessee, US

- Motto: Obstinatus sed Aequus (Latin)
- Type: Public community college
- Established: 1967
- Parent institution: Tennessee Board of Regents
- President: John Davis
- Undergraduates: 3,200
- Location: Cleveland, Tennessee, United States; 35.2002°N 84.8789°W
- Campus: Urban, 105 acres (0.42 km^{2})
- Colors: Navy Blue and Columbia Blue
- Nickname: Cougars
- Website: www.clevelandstatecc.edu

Cleveland State Community College is a public community college in Cleveland, Tennessee, United States. It is operated by the Tennessee Board of Regents. Like most community colleges, it emphasizes associate degree-level classes but it also offers some third- and fourth-year college-level courses as well through arrangements with other institutions.

== History ==
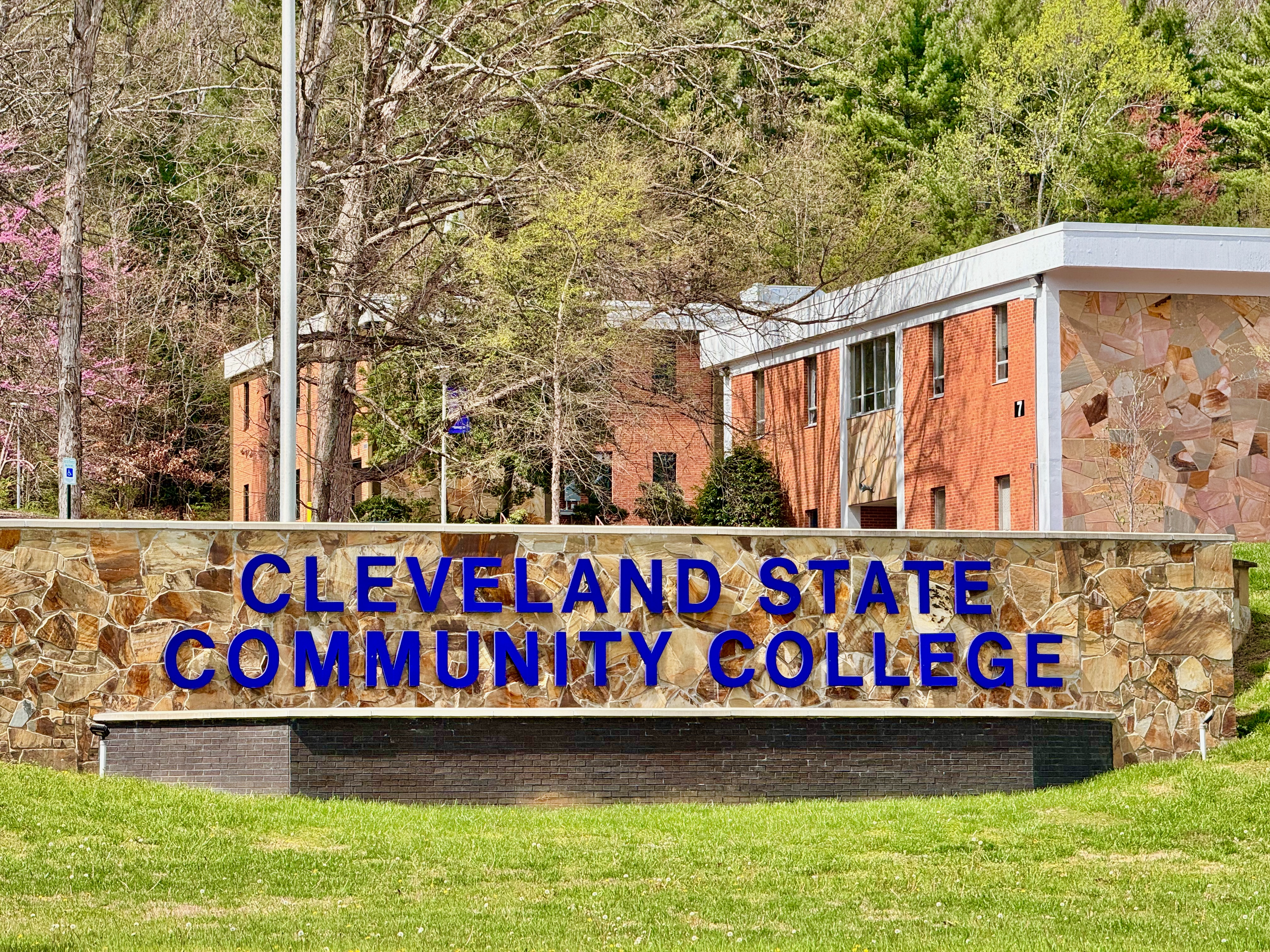
The entrance to Cleveland State Community College

The Tennessee Board of Education authorized the establishment of one of the first three community colleges in Tennessee on June 22, 1965. The name Cleveland State Community College was chosen by the board of education on February 11, 1966. Bids for the first five campus buildings were announced on July 20, 1966, and the school's campus broke ground on September 11, 1966. David F. Adkisson was named the first president on January 1, 1967. Approximately 700 students enrolled for the school's first classes which began on October 2, 1967, and took place at North Cleveland Baptist Church, due to a delay in the completion of the campus. At this time offices were held at 685 Broad Street N.W. in Downtown Cleveland. The move to the current campus and permanent facilities took place on January 3, 1968. At this time, the campus consisted of the Administration Building, Library, Science Building, Student Center, and Gymnasium. The official dedication ceremonies for the college took place on April 29, 1968. The first graduation ceremonies were conducted on June 1, 1969.

In 2021, the college opened its first new buildings in 46 years. The 53,000-square foot, $25 million two-story Health and Science Center opened on its Cleveland campus. The 52,000-square foot McMinn Higher Education Center opened in neighboring Athens three months later.

== Campus ==
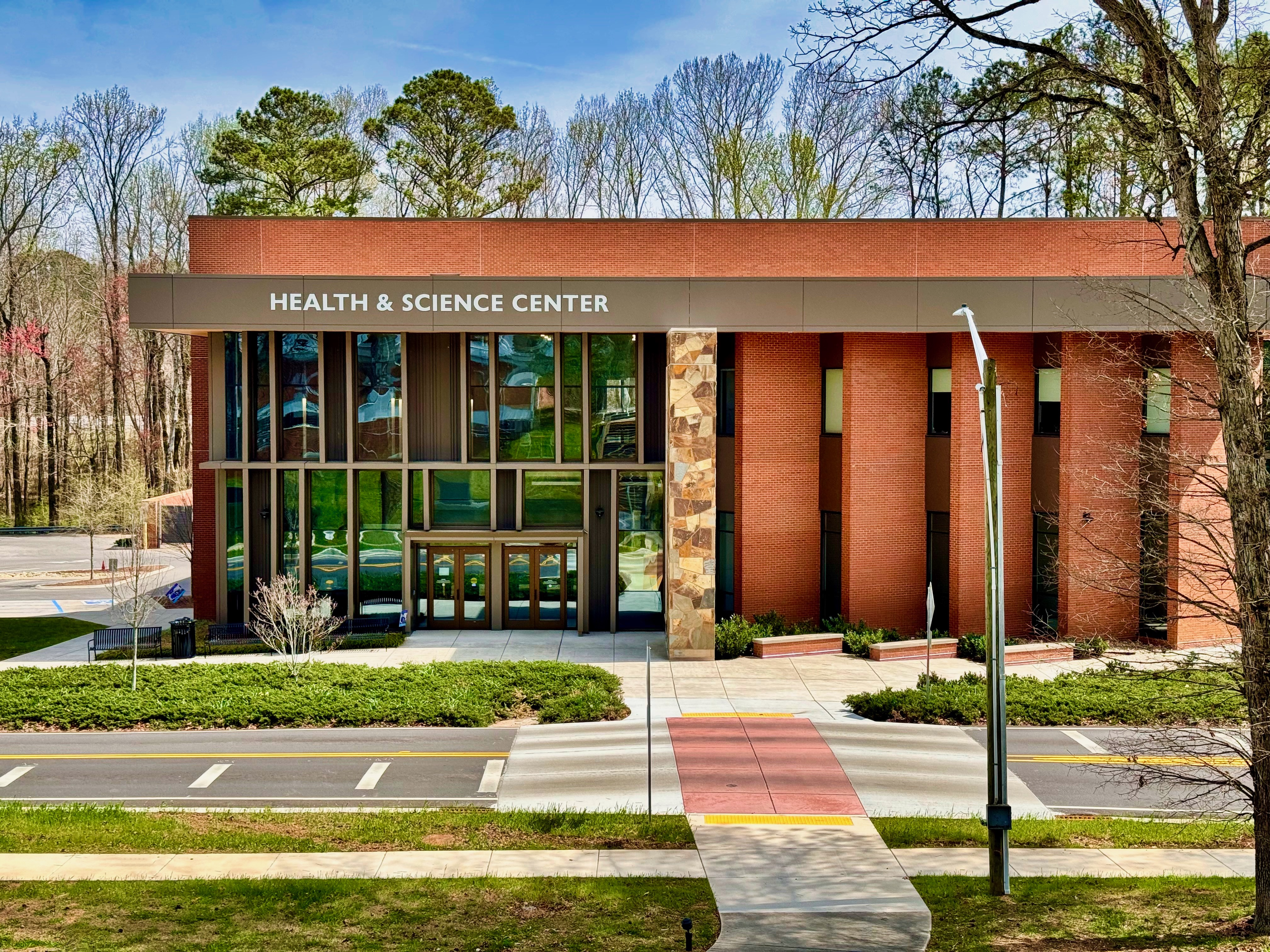
The college's Health & Science Center

The 105-acre (42 ha) sits on the eastern foot of Candies Creek Ridge in northern Cleveland near Interstate 75. The campus has 10 major buildings housing modern classrooms, laboratories, and student activity centers. Additional features include a library, a multi-media center of emphasis, computer laboratories, a 400-seat theatre, a 3,000-seat gymnasium, athletic fields and tennis courts, a large reflector telescope, and a satellite downlink receiver which enables the college to serve as a site for many teleconferences. Cleveland State offers classes throughout the service area in southeast Tennessee, which includes Bradley, Meigs, McMinn, Monroe, and Polk counties. The college also has offices and classrooms in Athens and Madisonville.

== Organization and administration ==
Cleveland State Community college operates within the governance of the Tennessee Board of Regents.

David F. Adkisson served as founding president of Cleveland State Community College from 1967 to 1978. L. Quentin Lane was appointed to the presidency in 1978 and served until 1985. A. Ray Coleman served briefly as interim president in 1985. James W. Ford was then appointed as president of Cleveland State from 1985 to 1992. Renate G. Basham served as interim president from 1992 to 1996. Carl M. Hite served as president from 1996 until 2013. Bill Seymour served as the college's president from 2013 to 2022. Ty Stone served as Cleveland State's first African American president from 2022 until 2023. Ray Brooks was appointed interim president until the appointment of Andy White. White, who was appointed president of Cleveland State in April 2024, retired in 2025. Brooks was again appointed interim president until the appointment of John Davis who was appointed president of Cleveland State in May 2026.

== Academics ==
Approximately 3,200 credit students and 1,300 non-credit students enroll in Cleveland State Community College in a typical fall semester. The credit student population is split about evenly in the choice of transfer or career-technical programs. The average age of all students is 28 years and the student population is non-racially identifiable. There are over 200 employees at the college including more than 70 full-time faculty members. Eighty-six percent of the faculty hold master's or doctoral degrees.

== Athletics ==
The college athletic teams are nicknamed the Cougars.

== Noted people ==
- Ryan Casteel - baseball player
- Jason Davis - baseball player
- Bubba Trammell - baseball player
