= Pellissippi State Community College =

Public college in Knox County, Tennessee, US

Coordinates: 35.94772°N 84.16635°W

- Former name: State Technical Institute at Knoxville
- Type: Public community college
- Established: 1974; 52 years ago
- Parent institution: Tennessee Board of Regents
- Endowment: $19.8 million (2025)
- President: Anthony Wise
- Location: Knoxville, Tennessee, United States
- Colors: Blue and yellow
- Nickname: Panthers
- Website: www.pstcc.edu

Pellissippi State Community College (Pellissippi State or PSTCC) is a public community college based in Knox and Blount Counties in Tennessee. It is operated by the Tennessee Board of Regents. The college's main campus is located in west Knox County. There are four satellite campuses in the surrounding area. Pellissippi State was named Pellissippi State Technical Community College until July 1, 2009. It is the successor to the former State Technical Institute at Knoxville ("STIK"), founded in 1974.

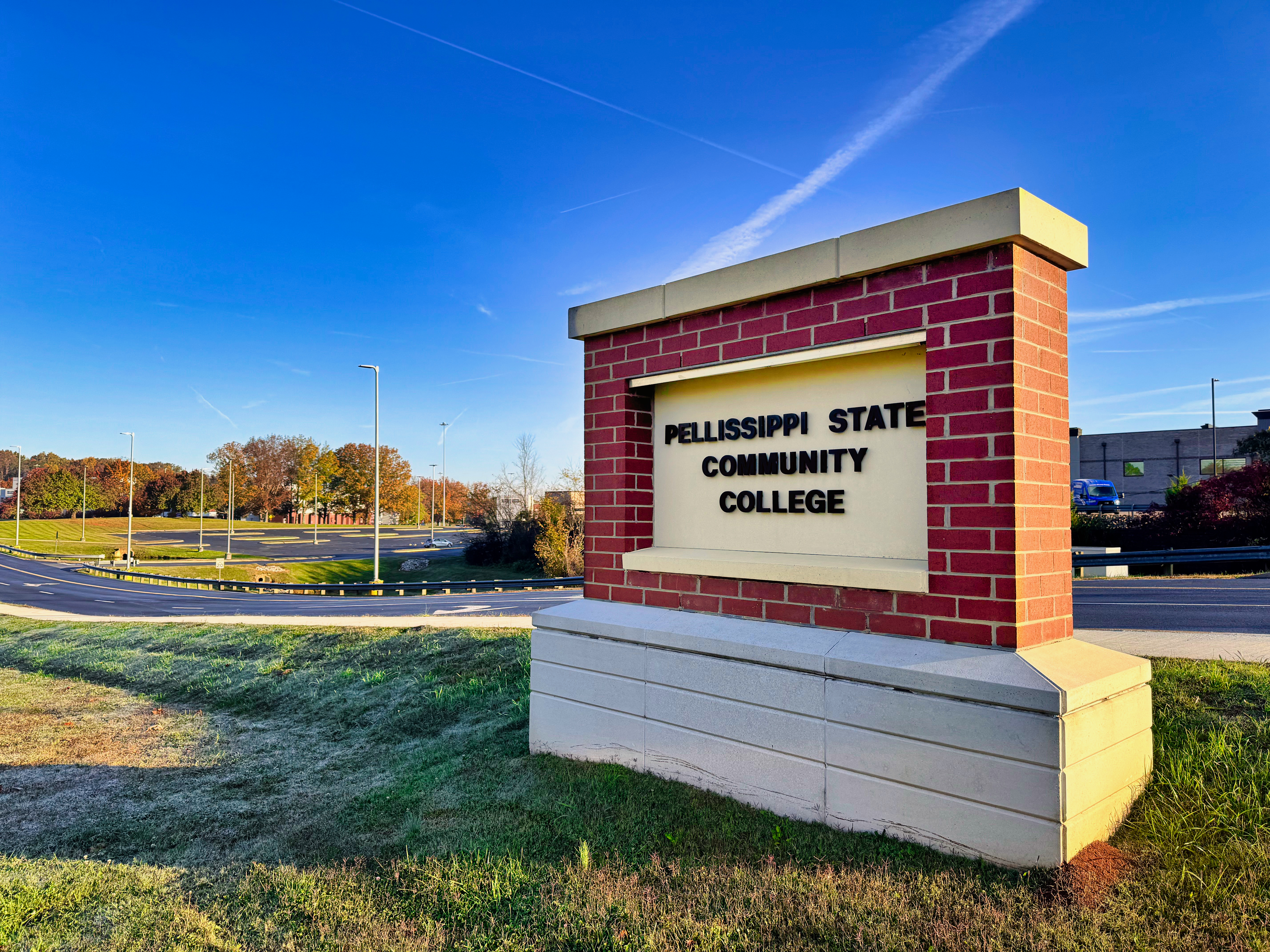
Entrance sign on the main campus

== Campus ==
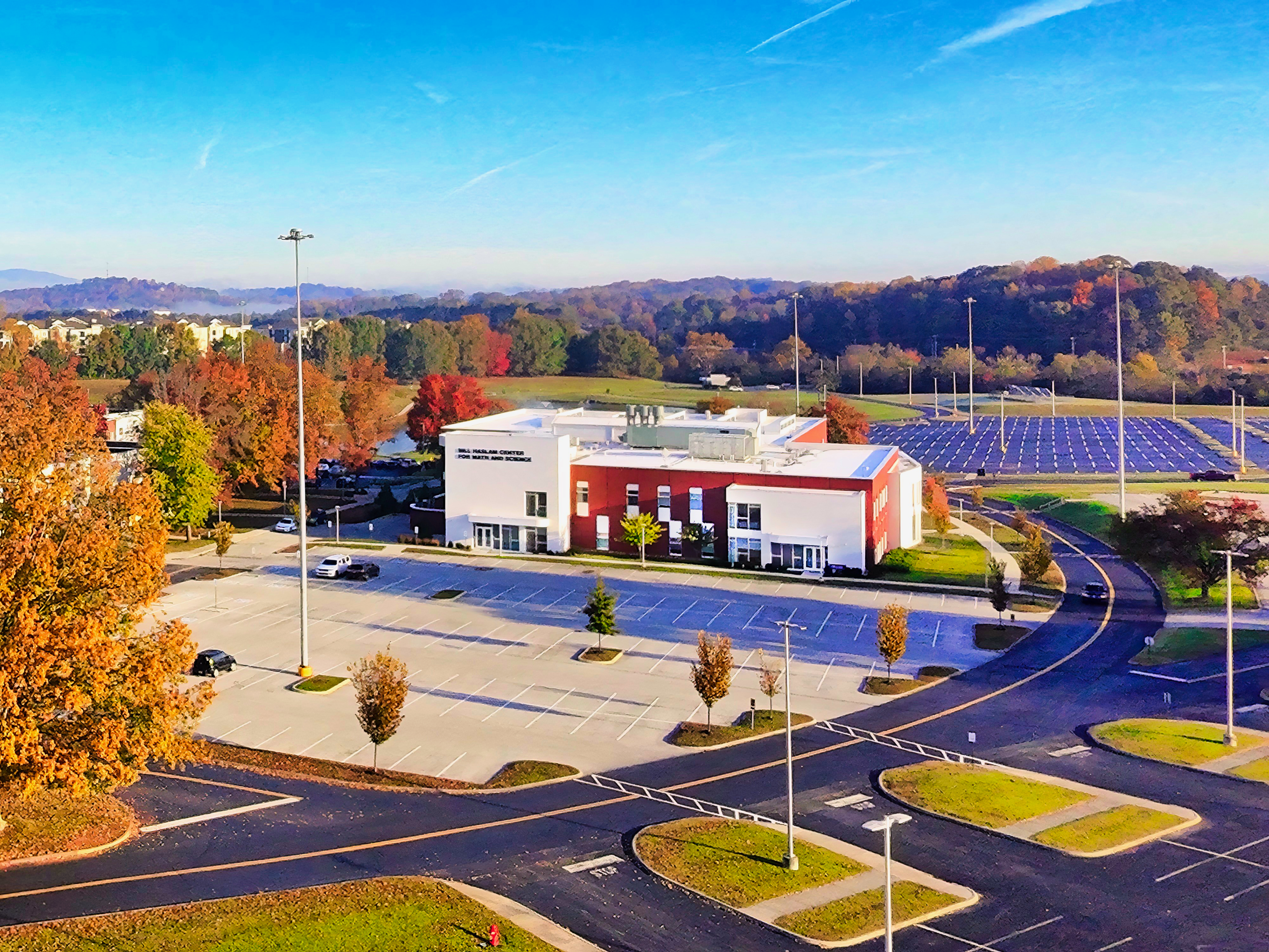
The Bill Haslam Center for Math and Science on the main campus

Pellissippi State Community College operates four campuses, as of Fall 2024, spread across the Knox County and Blount County area, including:

- Main Campus in Hardin Valley
- Magnolia Avenue Campus in East Knoxville
- Blount County Campus in Maryville
- Strawberry Plains Campus in Strawberry Plains

== History ==
The precursor to Pellissippi State, State Technical Institute at Knoxville, was established on September 4, 1974. The original school was added on as a wing to the Knoxville State Regional Vocational-Technical School and intended to simply provide post-secondary vocational training to area residents. However, at the backing of the newly seated director Colonel John C. Mauer, the Tennessee State Board of Vocational Education soon took over governance of the school, providing three associate degree programs in engineering technology to 45 students on the first day of classes, September 23, 1974.

STIK received its initial accreditation from the Commission on Colleges of the Southern Association of Colleges and Schools (SACS) in 1977, under the leadership of the first school president, Wayne Jones, and six years later, on July 1, 1983, STIK became a member of the State University and Community College System of Tennessee, thereby transferring governance of the school to the Tennessee Board of Regents.

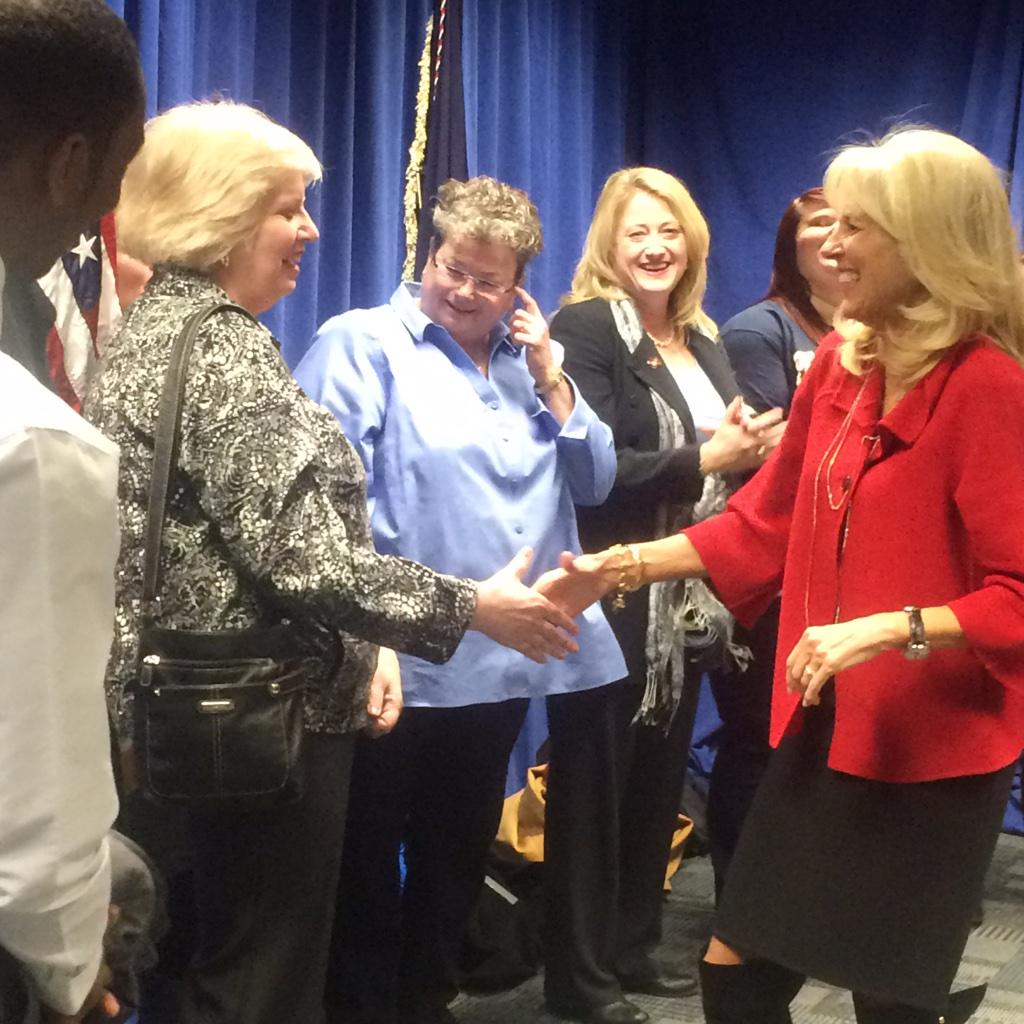
Jill Biden meeting faculty at Pellissippi State Community College in 2015.

In 1986 the campus was moved to its current location, on a 445-acre (1.80 km^{2}) plot in west Knox County near Pellissippi Parkway. Initially, STIK shared the campus with Roane State Community College. In 1988, however, the school's mission was broadened to include that of a technical community college, adding numerous university-parallel associate degree programs, changing its name to Pellissippi State Technical Community College, and absorbing the space occupied by Roane State.

A hot air balloon festival was held at the campus from 2004 to 2011.

=== Origin of name ===
Pellissippi (also spelled "Pelisipi") appears on early maps as the name of the Clinch River.

== Students and faculty ==
Pellissippi State employs about 185 full-time faculty, 265 adjunct faculty, 231 staff members, while serving over 10,000 students, between 100 and 150 of whom are classified as international.

== Notable alumni ==
Notable people who attended the college include:

- Keith L. Brown (musician) – American jazz pianist, educator, and composer
- Steve Hall – member of the Tennessee House of Representatives
- Demetrice Morley – American football defensive back
- Jason Zachary – member of the Tennessee State House of Representatives
