= List of Austin Peay State University alumni =

Austin Peay State University is a public university in Clarksville, Tennessee. The university was called the Austin Peay Normal School from 1925 to 1943, and Austin Peay State College from 1943 to 1967.

== Business ==
- Wayne Pace, 1968, chief financial officer and executive vice president of Time Warner
- Jeff Stec, entrepreneur who formed Peak Fitness

== Education ==
- Daniel R. Jeske, statistician and vice provost at the University of California, Riverside
- John G. Morgan, 1973, chancellor of the Tennessee Board of Regents and former comptroller of the Treasury of Tennessee
- Helen Craig Smith, educator and author, first black woman to receive a bachelor's degree from Austin Peay
- W. Dale Warren, conductor, professor of music and senior wind band director at the University of Arkansas

== Entertainment ==
- David Alford, 1989, actor
- Bob Harper, personal trainer who gained fame on The Biggest Loser
- Hickok45 (Greg Kinman), gun reviewer on YouTube
- Chonda Pierce, comedian, television hostess, author, and actor
- Josh Rouse, singer-songwriter

== Law ==
- Ben Dean, chancery court judge of the 19th Judicial District, Montgomery and Robertson counties
- Camille McMullen, judge of the Tennessee Court of Criminal Appeals
- Mary C. Noble, 1971 and 1975, secretary of the Kentucky Justice and Public Safety Cabinet, former deputy chief justice of the Kentucky Supreme Court

== Military ==
- Ronald L. Bailey, 1977, United States Marine Corps commanding general, 1st Marine Division
- David Hackworth, United States Army colonel and author

== Politics ==
- Steve Adams, 39th Tennessee state treasurer
- Andre Barnett, presidential candidate of the Reform Party in the 2012 United States presidential election
- David Bibb, deputy administrator of the U.S. General Services Administration
- Riley Darnell, Tennessee state senator and Tennessee secretary of state
- Tommy Head, 1967, Tennessee House of Representatives
- Jason Hodges, Tennessee House of Representatives
- Douglas S. Jackson, Tennessee state senator
- Darren Jernigan, Tennessee House of Representatives
- Curtis Johnson, Tennessee House of Representatives
- Ron Lollar, Tennessee House of Representatives
- John G. Morgan, 1973, comptroller of the Treasury of Tennessee and chancellor of the Tennessee Board of Regents
- Joe Pitts, 1980, mayor of Clarksville, Tennessee and member of the Tennessee House of Representatives
- Jay Reedy, 1990, Tennessee House of Representatives
- Phil Roe, 1967, U.S. House of Representatives
- Eric Stewart, Tennessee Senate

== Religion ==
- William J. Hadden, minister of the Christian Church (Disciples of Christ) and a priest of the Episcopal Church

== Sports ==
- Eli Abaev, professional basketball player for Hapoel Be'er Sheva in the Israeli Basketball Premier League
- Natalia Ariza, professional soccer player and member of the Colombia women's national football team at the 2012 Summer Olympics
- Tatiana Ariza, professional soccer player and member of the Colombia women's national football team at the 2012 Summer Olympics
- Erik Barnes, professional golfer
- Jack Bushofsky, college football coach and executive
- Rick Christophel, college and professional football coach
- Carrie Daniels, college basketball coach
- TyShwan Edmondson, professional basketball player
- A. J. Ellis, 1993, professional baseball player and special assistant to the general manager for the San Diego Padres
- George Fisher, college basketball coach and athletic administrator
- Calvin Garrett, professional basketball player
- Corey Gipson, college basketball coach
- Jeff Gooch, 1996, professional football players with the Tampa Bay Buccaneers and the Detroit Lions
- Ryne Harper, 2007, professional baseball player
- Trenton Hassell, 2001, professional basketball player, New Jersey Nets
- Will Hogue, World Long Drive competitor and three-time winner
- Chris Horton, professional basketball player for Hapoel Tel Aviv of the Israeli Basketball Premier League
- Otis Howard, professional basketball player, Milwaukee Bucks and Detroit Pistons
- Percy Howard, 1973, professional football player with the Dallas Cowboys
- Shawn Kelley, 2007, professional baseball player with the San Diego Padres
- Braden Layer, college football coach
- Hod Lisenbee, professional baseball player with the Washington Senators, Boston Red Sox, Philadelphia Athletics, and Cincinnati Reds
- Kristen Mattio, college basketball coach
- Gary McClure, college baseball coach
- Andy McCollum, college football coach
- D. J. Montgomery, professional football player
- Kyran Moore, professional gridiron football player with the Canadian Football League
- Noel Phillips, professional tennis player
- Drake Reed, professional basketball player
- Matt Reynolds, 2007, professional baseball player with the San Francisco Giants
- Josh Robinson, professional basketball players
- Tyler Rogers, 2013, professional baseball player with the San Francisco Giants
- Jared Savage, professional basketball player
- George Sherrill, 1999, professional baseball player with the Seattle Mariners, the Baltimore Orioles, and the Los Angeles Dodgers
- Bonnie Sloan, 1973, professional football player
- Jimmy Stewart, 1961, professional baseball player and utility man and scout for Major League Baseball
- Barry Sumpter, professional baseball player
- Michael Swift, 1997, professional football player
- Terry Taylor, professional basketball player for the Chicago Bulls
- Greg Tubbs, professional baseball player
- Jamie Walker, 1992, professional baseball player with the Kansas City Royals, the Detroit Tigers, and the Baltimore Orioles
- Bubba Wells, 1997, professional basketball player with the Dallas Mavericks
- Walt Wells, college football coach
- James "Fly" Williams, professional basketball players
- Howie Wright, professional basketball players
- Jack Zduriencik, former general manager of the Seattle Mariners
