= Justin Potter =

American businessman

- Born: 1898; Liberty, Tennessee, US
- Died: 1961 (aged 62–63)
- Occupation: Businessman
- Spouse: Valere (Blair) Potter
- Relatives: David K. Wilson (son-in-law); Justin P. Wilson (grandson)

Justin Smith "Jet" Potter (1898–1961) was an American businessman from Tennessee. His business interests included coal mining and sales and distribution in Kentucky; a chemical corporation; insurance; banking; and media holdings. Staunchly opposed to labor unions, he hired armed guards to keep them away from his coal mines. He was also a strident opponent of the Tennessee Valley Authority.

== Early life ==
Potter was born in 1898 in Liberty, Tennessee. His father was a banker. When he was eight years old, he moved to Nashville, Tennessee with his family. He had a brother, Edward Potter Jr. (1896–1976), who founded the Commerce Union Bank in Nashville (now merged with Bank of America).

== Career ==
In 1920, he founded the Nashville Coal Co., a coal distribution company. By 1955, it had become the tenth largest coal company in the United States. That year, he sold it to businessman Cyrus Eaton (1883–1979) for US$18 million. In 1958, he became the majority shareholder of Virginia-Carolina Chemical Co. and served as its President. Additionally, he served on the board of directors of the Cherokee Insurance Corporation. He owned over 100,000 acres of coalfields in Western Kentucky as President of the Crescent Coal Co., headquartered in Central City, Kentucky. For example, he owned a large coal mine in Uniontown, Kentucky. Under his leadership, the presence of labor unions were not allowed and he was categorically opposed to them. He personally expressed his disapproval of the tactics used by union leader John L. Lewis (1880–1969). He even hired armed guards to keep union members away from his coal mines. Additionally, he was a mentor to Joe C. Davis Jr. (1919–1989) in the coal distribution industry.

Potter was a strident opponent of the Tennessee Valley Authority and tried to unseat both Estes Kefauver (1903–1963) and Albert Gore Sr. (1907–1998), who supported the TVA. In Farm and Ranch Magazine, of which he was majority owner from 1956 to 1959, the TVA was routinely called a "socialistic" project. Moreover, he bought full-page advertisements in the Chicago Tribune in which he called the project a "communist rathole."

He became one of the wealthiest men in the Southern United States, with an estimated wealth of US$200 million.

== Personal life ==
He married Valere (Blair) Potter, a philanthropist who helped found the Peabody Preparatory School of Musical Arts in 1964, now known as the Blair School of Music at Vanderbilt University. The Valere Blair Potter Chair at the Blair School of Music as well as the Valere Potter Scholarship Fund at the Vanderbilt University School of Nursing is also named in her honour.

Potter suffered a stroke in the 1950s. He died of cancer in December 1961.

== Legacy ==
The Boy Scouts center on the corner of Woodmont Boulevard and Hillsboro Road in Nashville is named in his honor. The library in downtown Smithville, Tennessee also bears his name.
