= David K. Wilson =

American businessman (1919–2007)

- Born: June 15, 1919; Nashville, Tennessee
- Died: May 20, 2007 (aged 87); Nashville, Tennessee
- Resting place: Mount Olivet Cemetery
- Education: Vanderbilt University; Harvard Business School
- Occupations: Businessman; Philanthropist
- Political party: Republican
- Spouses: Anne Potter; Paula R. Wilson
- Children: Patrick Wilson (dead); Justin P. Wilson; William Wilson; Blair Wilson
- Parent(s): Charles P. Wilson; Florence Moss Wilson
- Relatives: Justin Potter (father-in-law)

David K. Wilson (1919–2007) was an American businessman and philanthropist. He was the Chairman of the Cherokee Equity Corporation, a privately held insurance corporation, as well as Genesco (NYSE: GCO), a publicly traded footwear corporation. Additionally, he became one of Tennessee's largest philanthropists, focusing on his alma mater, Vanderbilt University, but also other colleges, schools and museums. He was also a major donor and decision-maker within the Republican Party.

== Early life ==
David Kirkpatrick Wilson was born on June 15, 1919, in Nashville, Tennessee. His father, Charles P. Wilson, was the co-owner of the Fletcher-Wilson Coffee Company in Nashville; his mother was Florence Moss Wilson. He had two brothers, Charles P. Wilson Jr. and William Moss Wilson. He graduated from Vanderbilt University in 1941 and attended the Harvard Business School in Cambridge, Massachusetts. During World War II, he served in the United States Navy for four years, as part of a naval construction unit in the Pacific.

== Career ==
In 1946, Wilson co-founded the Cherokee Insurance Company, later known as the Cherokee Equity Corporation. He served as its chairman from its creation in 1946 to his death in 2007. He also served as Chairman of Genesco (NYSE: GCO), a publicly traded footwear corporation headquartered in Nashville. Wilson resigned from Genesco in 1986. According to Genesco, Wilson and two other directors left to avoid a potential conflict of interest. Wilson was on the board of directors of First American Bank, one of Genesco's creditors, during this time. Wilson was also a director of Commerce Union Bank.

He served as president of the Nashville Area Chamber of Commerce and helped found Leadership Nashville. He also served on the board of directors of the Metro Airport Authority for the Nashville International Airport.

== Republican politics ==
Over the years, he was a major donor to Republican candidates. As early as 1973, he was the largest donor to Howard Baker's senatorial re-election campaign, by donating $10,000 in public records.

He became heavily involved in funding of the National Republican Party in 1973–1974, when future President George H. W. Bush was chairman. In 1973, he admitted that the Watergate scandal had curtailed donations from big donors to the GOP, while small donations of $100 were still coming in. However, he sent encouraging letters to donors to help revitalize Republican fundraising efforts. In 1996, he served as co-finance Chair of Lamar Alexander's presidential campaign. In that year, Wilson's family was the largest donor to Alexander's campaign, giving $83,750.

Shortly before he died in 2007, he donated to Mitt Romney's presidential campaign.

== Philanthropy ==
Most of his philanthropy focused on education, especially higher education. He served on the Board of Trustees of his alma mater, Vanderbilt University, from 1963 to 2007, serving as its chairman from 1981 to 1991. Thanks to his first marriage, he served on the board of trustees of the Justin and Valere Potter Foundation. Many of his donations to Vanderbilt University came from the family foundation. In 1964, he helped found the Blair School of Music on the campus of Vanderbilt University. He was also one of the co-founders of the Owen Graduate School of Management. Later, he helped endow professorships for the Blair School of Music, but also for the Vanderbilt University Divinity School, the Vanderbilt University College of Arts and Science, the Owen Graduate School of Management, and the Vanderbilt University School of Nursing. In 1997, he donated US$1 million to create the Harvie Branscomb Distinguished Visiting Scholar chair in honor of former Chancellor Harvie Branscomb. He also endowed the Potter Scholarship in the Vanderbilt University School of Medicine. Moreover, alongside Jack C. Massey (1904-1990), the Freedom Forum and Mobil (now known as ExxonMobil), he was one of the major donors for the establishment of the Vanderbilt Television News Archive. Additionally, he served as chairman of the Board of Trustees of Cumberland University, a smaller private college in Lebanon, Tennessee, the Montgomery Bell Academy, a private academy in Nashville, and the Robert A. Taft Institute of Government.

Additionally, he was one of the co-founders of the Tennessee Performing Arts Center and a member of the Nashville Urban League. Interested in historic preservation, he sat on the board of trustees of the National Trust for Historic Preservation and served as a member of the President's Advisory Council on Historic Preservation. In Nashville, he sat on the board of trustees of the Travellers Rest, a historic plantation turned into a museum. Moreover, he served as Chairman of the Cheekwood Botanical Garden and Museum of Art, another historic plantation turned into a museum in Nashville. In 1998, he received the Tocqueville Society Award from the United Way of Nashville.

== Personal life and legacy ==
In 1942, Wilson married Anne Potter, daughter of millionaire businessman and philanthropist Justin Potter (1898–1961). They had four sons, Patrick Wilson, Justin P. Wilson, William, and Blair. Patrick Wilson died in a car accident. After Wilson's first wife died, he remarried to Paula R. Wilson.

He was an elder of the First Presbyterian Church.

== Death and legacy ==
Wilson died on May 20, 2007, and he was buried in the Mount Olivet Cemetery in Nashville. The David K. Wilson Hall on the campus of Vanderbilt University is named in his honor. Additionally, his portrait, painted by Ann Street, hangs in Kirkland Hall, the administration building on the Vanderbilt campus.
