= Municipal Technical Advisory Service =

- Abbreviation: MTAS
- Formation: 1949
- Headquarters: Knoxville
- Region served: Tennessee
- Parent organization: University of Tennessee Institute for Public Service (IPS)
- Affiliations: Tennessee Municipal League
- Website: mtas.tennessee.edu

The Municipal Technical Advisory Service (MTAS) is an agency of the University of Tennessee Institute for Public Service (IPS) that provides assistance and training to municipal officials and employees in Tennessee, among them mayors, council members, city managers, city administrators, city recorders, and department heads.

== History ==
In April 1948, public administration expert Luther Gulick delivered the keynote address for the ninth annual convention of the Tennessee Municipal League (TML). In this speech, Gulick discussed the need for Tennessee to establish "a local government technical advisory service," within either the Department of Finance and Taxation or the state university. The staff of this agency would consist of consultants with experience in such fields as "fiscal administration…traffic and crime prevention, and…other major common problems on which the state does not now make technical advice and assistance available." A director would lead the agency, and an advisory council – made up of local government officials and experts, as well as technical representatives from major state departments – would give the new agency guidance and direction.

Gulick's proposal resonated with TML's director, Herb Bingham, who carried the proposal to the state legislature. In 1949, at the recommendation of TML, the Tennessee General Assembly passed Senate Bill 607, establishing a public agency, much like the one Gulick had envisioned, to serve cities and towns across the state. Governor Gordon Browning signed the bill into law on April 15, 1949, legally establishing the Municipal Technical Advisory Service (MTAS) within the University of Tennessee (UT). According to the bill, MTAS's goals and responsibilities would include conducting studies and research in municipal government, distributing publications, and "furnishing technical, consultative, and field services to municipalities in problems relating to fiscal administration, accounting, tax assessment and collection, law enforcement, improvements and public works, and in any and all matters relating to municipal government." The General Assembly also stipulated that MTAS would be funded through a line-item in the UT budget and through a small percentage of municipalities' share of the state sales tax revenues. MTAS began offering services to cities in 1949, with an annual budget of $70,000. Victor Hobday served as municipal management consultant, Murphy U. Snoderly as engineering and public works consultant, Procter C. Greenwood as legal consultant, and Pan Dodd Eimon as publications consultant. Within the next few years, MTAS hired a finance consultant, William Snodgrass, as well as a second management consultant, Ed Meisenhelder. MTAS also provided cities with a way to access the expertise of UT faculty and personnel. In the mid-1950s, MTAS underwent further expansion with the addition of a codification attorney.

Gerald W. Shaw of the Tennessee Valley Authority (TVA) was appointed to act as MTAS's first Executive Director and served in this capacity until 1951, when Victor C. Hobday, a management consultant at MTAS, took up the role. Hobday served as Executive Director until 1980, and by the time of his retirement, MTAS's staff had grown to include 25 consultants. Today, MTAS is one of six agencies of the UT Institute for Public Service, which the General Assembly established in 1971 to serve Tennessee cities, counties, and small industries. IPS's other agencies are the County Technical Assistance Service (CTAS), Center for Industrial Services (CIS), Law Enforcement Innovation Center (LEIC), Naifeh Center for Effective Leadership, and the Tennessee Language Center.

== Offices & organization ==
MTAS's headquarters is located in Knoxville, with satellite offices in Chattanooga, Jackson, Johnson City, Martin, Memphis, and Nashville.

Positioned within UT, MTAS is a non-political, objective, and multi-disciplinary agency, and it continues to work in cooperation with the Tennessee Municipal League. MTAS's staff includes many former municipal executives and department heads.

MTAS's Executive Director reports to the IPS Vice President, who in turn reports to the University of Tennessee President. The agency is organized into units and teams including Business Operations, Internal Support, the Research and Information Center, Finance, Legal and Codes, Municipal Management, Technical, and Training.

== Services ==
MTAS provides many services to incorporated cities and towns across Tennessee. As of September 2010, 58% of Tennessee's population resided within these communities, with 30% living in cities with populations under 25,000. MTAS assists these smaller communities in dealing with traditional city services and challenges, but the agency also makes its expertise and support available to Tennessee's larger cities, which are faced with relatively more complex issues. Such issues include resource sustainability, smart growth, social services, and education. MTAS technical consultants work with city officials on matters relating to public safety (police and fire), public works and utilities, human resources, and information technology (IT). In one example from the 1980s, MTAS consultants worked extensively with the Tennessee Department of Health and Environment (TDHE) to help cities that were seeking to obtain grants to improve their wastewater treatment facilities. MTAS advised these cities at all stages of the process of updating their sewage treatment systems, from planning to funding to construction, and continued to advise city officials after the new systems went online. Other utility and public works projects that MTAS has undertaken include solid waste management studies, review of city design and construction standards and specifications, water and wastewater studies, and compliance with GASB 34.

In addition, MTAS offers consulting services in the areas of municipal law, finance and accounting, and general municipal management. In 2009, for example, the agency completed over 1,000 projects related to municipal management. As stipulated by Tennessee Code Annotated § 6-54-904, the agency disseminates and, as necessary, amends a model travel and expense policy for municipalities. MTAS is also responsible for disseminating models of ethical standards for municipal officials and employees, and for advising municipalities on how to remain in compliance with Tennessee's open meetings laws. In addition, MTAS staff produce and maintain municipal codes for a number of Tennessee cities.

The MTAS Research and Information Center provides information resources on such topics as finance and accounting, human resources, legal assistance, municipal management, public safety, public utilities, public works, and onsite training. The Research and Information Center contains a large collection of print materials, and makes resources like legal opinions, Request for Proposals (RFPs), job descriptions, sample forms, and sample ordinances available. The library's staff also responds to reference questions and conducts surveys for cities and towns.

MTAS training programs help equip city officials and staff with the tools necessary to perform many of their day to day job duties. Subjects that MTAS has offered courses on include planning and development, law and ethics, and human resources and fiscal management. The Elected Official Academy (EOA) and Certified Municipal Finance Officers Program (CMFO) are two examples of municipal training that MTAS delivers. The CMFO program seeks to improve municipal finance officers' abilities to record and report financial data in the most accurate and timely manner, in accordance with standard accounting principles required by the state. The EOA covers topics such as municipal government structure, charters and codes, local finances, city council responsibilities, risk management, and media relations, among others. In addition, Tennessee Code Annotated § 6-54-1007 states that MTAS "shall develop the continuing education curricula" and conduct training for anyone appointed to serve as a city's administrative hearing officer.
