= King University =

Private university in Bristol, Tennessee, U.S.

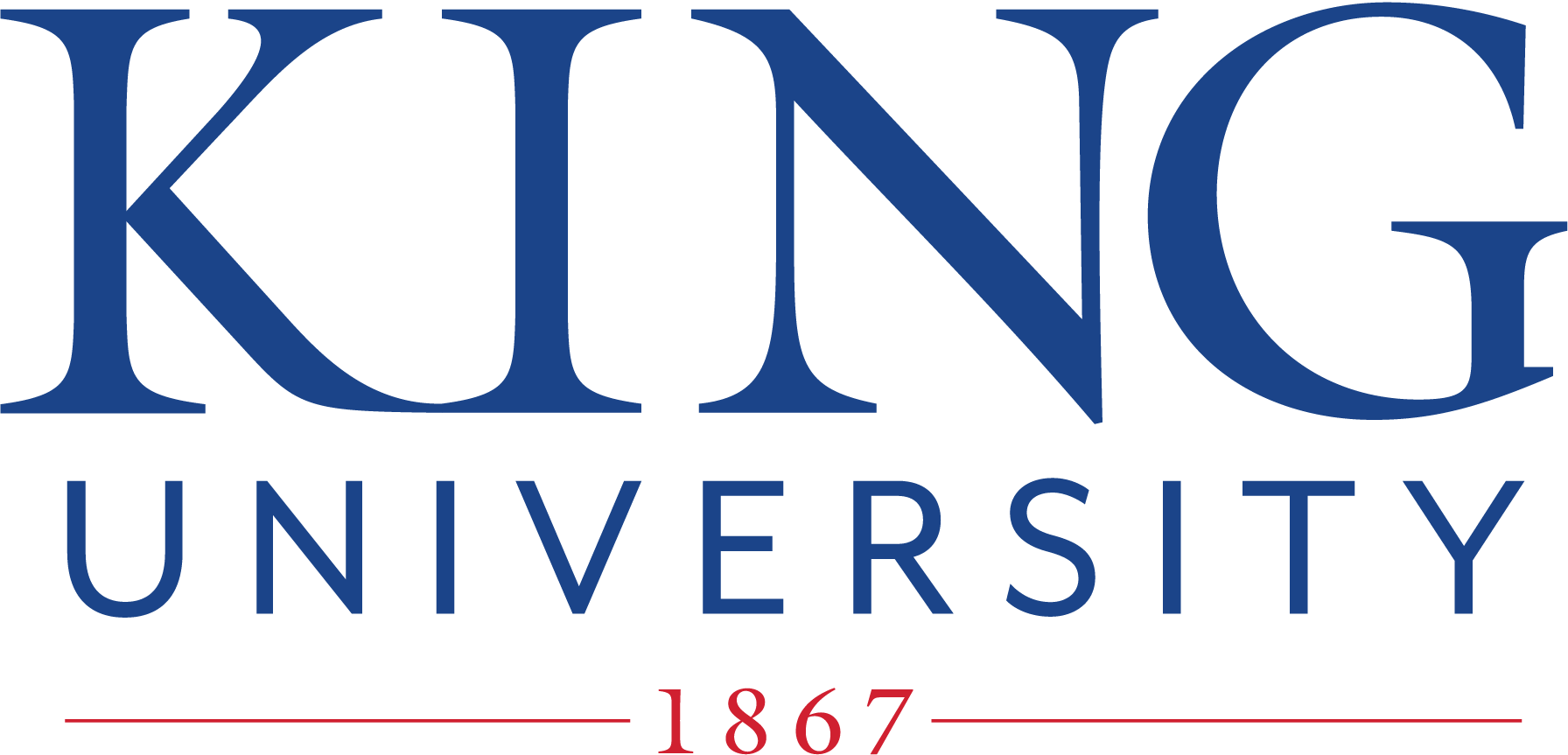
- Former name: King College (1867–2013)
- Motto: Ecclesiae et Litteris (Latin)
- Motto in English: For the Church and For Learning
- Type: Private university
- Established: 1867; 159 years ago
- Accreditation: SACSCOC
- Religious affiliation: Presbyterian
- Academic affiliations: CCCU; CIC; NAICU
- Endowment: $40.4 million (2025)
- President: W. Andrew Tooley
- Students: 1,357 (Fall 2022)
- Location: Bristol, Tennessee, United States; 36.587°N 82.159°W
- Campus: 135 wooded acres (0.55 km^{2} (0.21 sq mi))
- Colors: Blue & Red
- Nickname: The Tornado
- Sporting affiliations: NCAA Division II – Conference Carolinas
- Mascot: Twister the Lion
- Website: king.edu

King University is a Presbyterian-affiliated private university in Bristol, Tennessee, United States. Founded in 1867, King is independently governed with covenant affiliations to the Presbyterian Church (USA) and the Evangelical Presbyterian Church (EPC).

== History ==
In April 1866, the Holston Presbytery assembled at the old Pleasant Grove Church in Bristol, Tennessee, to establish a college under the Presbyterian Church of the United States (PCUS). Reverend James King, a local minister, donated 25 acres of land and 3 buildings to be used for this purpose. Opening as Bristol High School, the first classes were offered in August 1867. After receiving a charter from Tennessee, the institution was renamed to King College, in honor of Reverend James King.

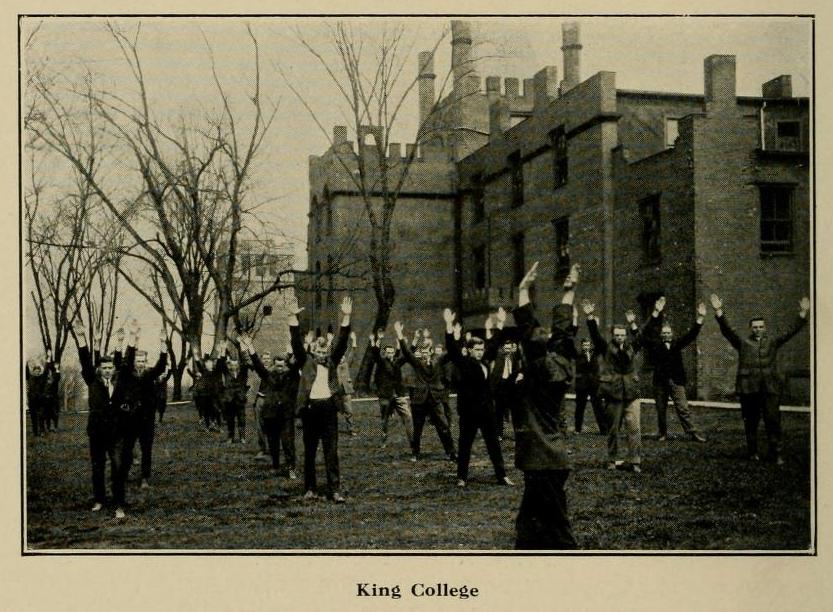
The King College in 1915

When the college outgrew its small campus, King's grandson Isaac Anderson donated land on a hillside east of Bristol and in 1917, the college moved to its present location.

In January 2013, King College announced that it would change its name to King University. The name change reflects the master's-level, comprehensive benchmark that King has reached in recent years. Becoming a university was the natural unfolding of King's strategic plan, unveiled in 1998, to create an even broader mix of programs based on a university model. On June 1, 2013, King College officially became King University.

In December 2013, King University was granted a Level V designation by the Southern Association of Colleges and Schools Commission on Colleges (SACSCOC), after a two-year application and review process. As a result, King University began its first doctoral program, a Doctorate of Nursing Practice, in the Fall 2014.

== Campus ==
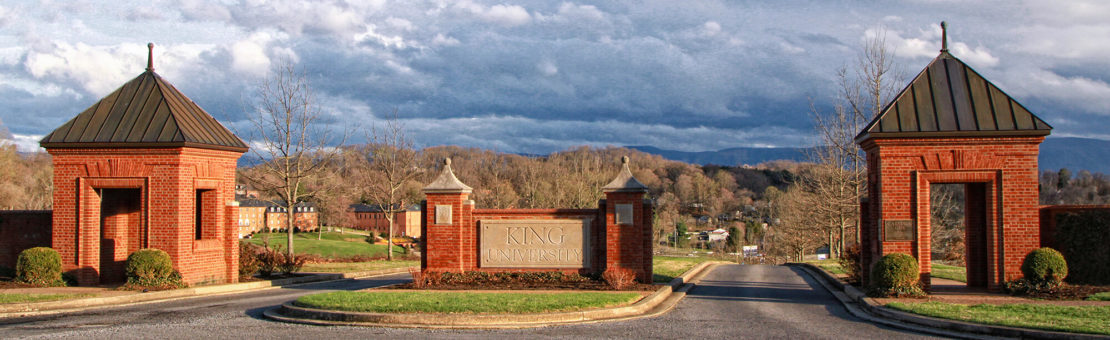
King University Campus

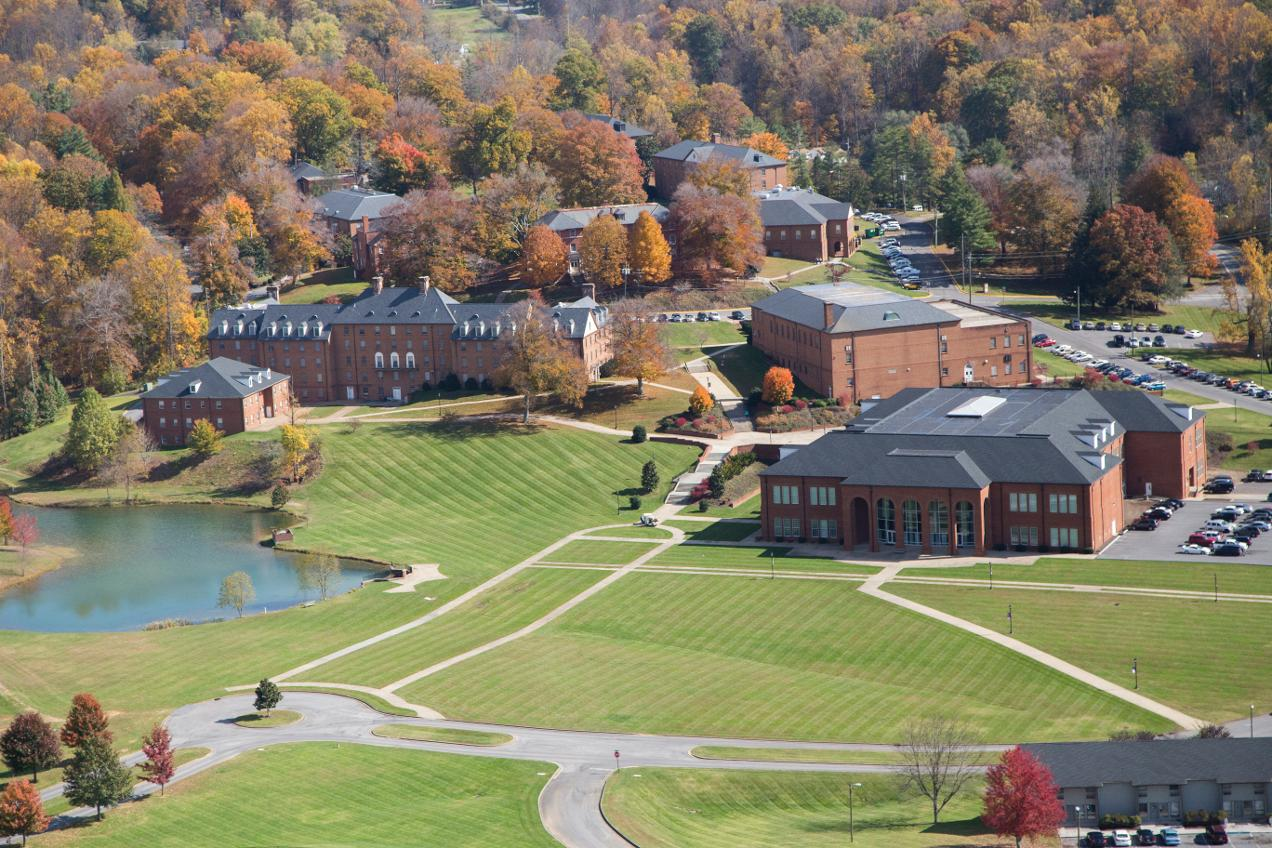
King's campus in 2014

The King University campus is located on 135 acres (55 ha) approximately 1.7 miles (2.7 km) from downtown Bristol, Tennessee. All main buildings on campus are brick and of Georgian-style architecture. King University had three additional Tennessee campuses located in Kingsport and Knoxville. At one time, there were 10 additional instructional locations across Southwest Virginia and Tennessee.

== Accreditation and memberships ==
King University is accredited by the Commission on Colleges of the Southern Association of Colleges and Schools (SACSCOC)

King is a member of numerous associations, including the Appalachian College Association (ACA), the Tennessee Independent Colleges and Universities Association (TICUA) and the Council for Christian Colleges and Universities (CCCU).

== Academics ==
King University offers more than 80 undergraduate majors, minors and pre-professional programs. Several professional studies programs are offered for working professionals and most programs are available in face-to-face and online formats. King also offers several graduate programs: Master of Social Work (MSW), Master of Business Administration (MBA), Master of Education (MEd), Master of Science in nursing (MSN), and Doctor of Nursing Practice (DNP).

=== Schools ===
King University is organized into six schools:

- College of Arts and Sciences
- Peeke School of Christian Mission
- The School of Health and Professional Sciences
- The School of Business, Economics and Technology
- The School of Education
- The School of Nursing

=== Libraries ===
- E.W. King Library (main campus): The E.W. King library contains a collection of over 140,000 items and is located on the north side of the campus Oval.

=== Curriculum ===
The Core Curriculum of King University underwent its last major revision by the faculty during Spring 2009. The Core is composed of a Common Experience, four semester hours of courses that all tradition undergraduates must take at the college, and General Education, thirty-eight hours of courses that span the traditional liberal arts.

=== Experience DC ===
As part of the university's First Year Experience Program, each year the entire freshman class travels to Washington, D.C. for an experiential learning trip known as Experience DC. During the trip, students visit offices of legislators, national museums, international organizations, art galleries and various public venues. Participants are challenged to explore their views on the arts, religion, varying cultures and issues facing humankind. The trip also helps students examine career options.

=== Institutes ===
The university hosts three academic institutes:

- Institute of Security and Intelligence Studies: The King Institute for Security and Intelligence Studies (KISIS) is a nonprofit, nonpartisan organization dedicated to the scholarly study and advancement of security and intelligence issues.
- Institute for Regional and Economic Studies: The King Institute for Regional Economic Studies (KIRES) was established in 2012 to expand the scope of the King University Regional Economic Studies (KCRES) team. A small KCRES team was formed in 2010 within King's School of Business to provide analysis of economic problems and opportunities confronting the region served by King University.
- Institute for Faith & Culture: The King Institute aims to cultivate a conversation that is both artful and substantial on issues of Christian faith and culture, creating spaces for students and community members to find friendship and shared purpose.

== Student life ==
=== Student government ===
The Student Government Association (SGA) is the formal representative entity for the student body, consisting of elected executive officers (President and Vice President) and a Senate representing each class (Freshman, Sophomore, Junior, and Senior). The SGA serves as the voice of the students to the board of trustees, administration, faculty, and staff. The SGA also charters, funds, and oversees other student organizations.

=== Student publications ===
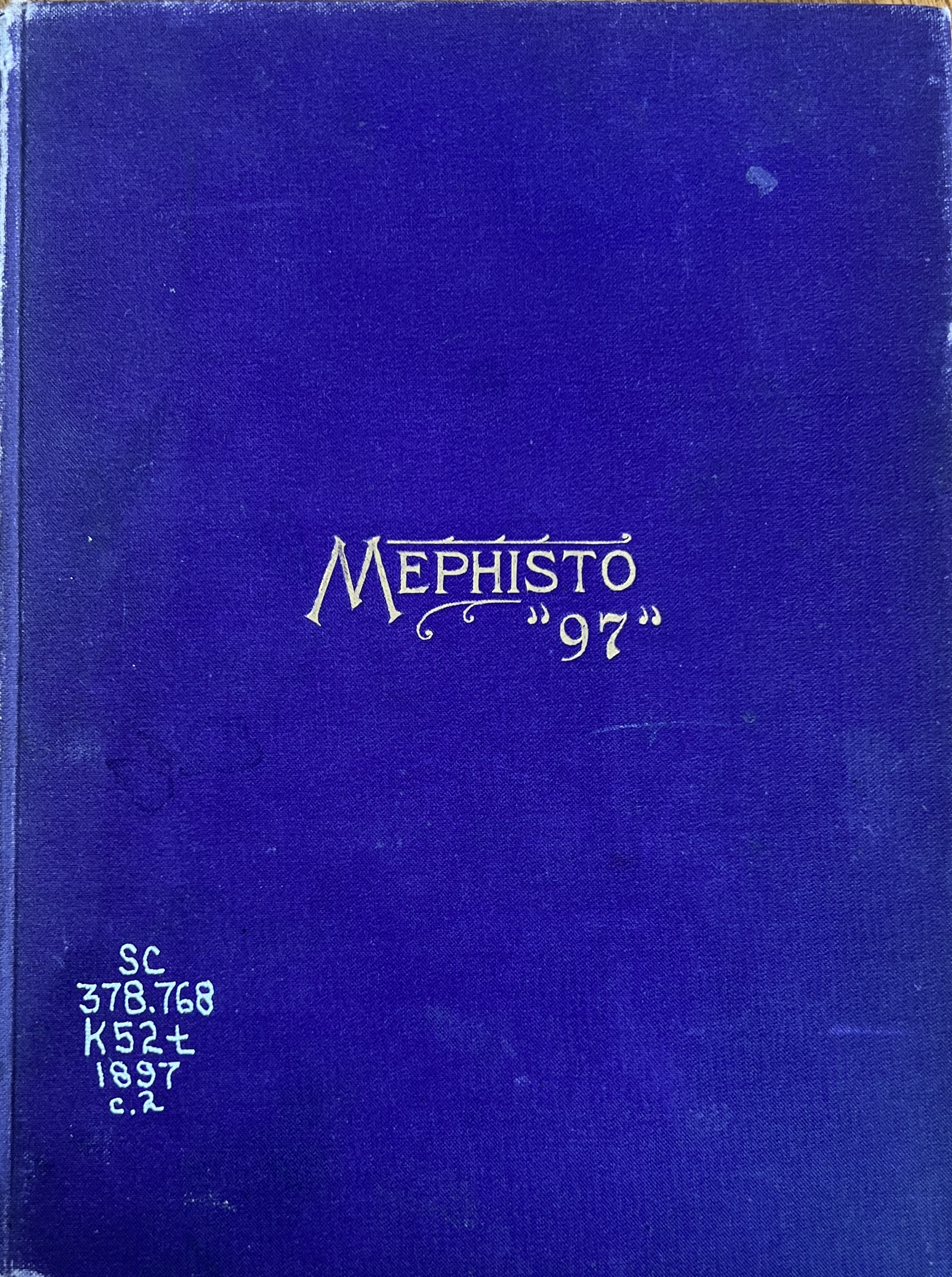
Mephisto (1897), the first yearbook published by King College.

Students have the opportunity to work in journalism and publishing. The Kayseean is the student newspaper; it transitioned to an online format in 2019.

King College published its first yearbook, Mephisto, in 1897. In 1938, the yearbook was renamed to The Tornado, which ran until 2012.

=== Student activities ===
The Student Life Activities Committee at King (SLACK) is a student group responsible for organizing and executing student activities under the direction of the Director of Student Life. Events in the past have included: concerts, dances, movies, outdoor adventures (canoeing, caving, ropes courses), overnight trips, International Fair, Oktoberfest, a late night exam breakfast, an end-of-the-year luau, Safe Spring Break promotion, and bingo nights.

A program of intramural sports, called SLACK Sports, is offered to students. Typical sports include: indoor soccer, flag football, volleyball, dodgeball, bowling, and ultimate frisbee. In addition, intramural video game tournaments, Texas Hold'em poker tournaments, chess tournaments, and board game nights are also held throughout the year.

== Athletics ==
The King athletic teams are called the Tornado. The university is a member of the NCAA Division II ranks, primarily competing in the Conference Carolinas (CC) since the 2011–12 academic year. They were also a member of the National Christian College Athletic Association (NCCAA), primarily competing as an independent in the Mid-East Region of the Division I level. The Tornado previously competed as an NCAA D-II Independent from 2009–10 to 2010–11; and in the Appalachian Athletic Conference (AAC) of the National Association of Intercollegiate Athletics (NAIA) from 2001–02 to 2008–09.

King competes in 25 intercollegiate varsity sports: Men's sports include baseball, basketball, cross-country, golf, soccer, swimming & diving, tennis, track & field, volleyball and wrestling; while women's sports include acrobatics & tumbling, basketball, cross-country, golf, softball, soccer, swimming & diving, tennis, track & field, triathlon, volleyball and wrestling; and co-ed sports include bass fishing, cheerleading, cycling, dance and Esports.

=== Nickname ===
The university nickname, the Tornado, was adopted in 1922 following a 206–0 football win over North Carolina rival Lenoir College (now Lenoir–Rhyne University). The local newspaper covering the event wrote the headline "King College's Victory Was 'Tornado' Of Week's Games" and began referring to the football team as the "Tornado". This is a record score which stands in the annals of collegiate football as one of the highest ever won on the gridiron.

=== Mascot ===
Twister, a lion, was unveiled as the university's new mascot on September 2, 2011. Twister is a fearless lion that represents the determination and courage reflected in King's adventure as an NCAA Division II institution. Equipped with his King colors of navy blue and scarlet red, Twister dons the number 11 on his back while rallying those in Tornado Athletics and the King University community.

== Spiritual life ==
Students have many opportunities to explore Christian beliefs and spiritual traditions. Opportunities abound with chapel, the King Institute for Faith and Culture, Christian ministry groups, and service projects. Each year, student teams also travel nationally and internationally for a range of mission and study abroad trips.

All traditional King students are required to obtain fourteen chapel, convocation, or community service credit hours per semester.

=== The King University Institute for Faith and Culture ===
Inaugurated in 2008 and dedicated to the work and example of Frederick Buechner, the Buechner Institute at King University explored the relationship between faith and culture. In 2015, after the death of Dale Brown, founding director, and at the request of the Buechner Literary Assets, LLC, the Buechner Institute became the King Institute for Faith and Culture. The King Institute for Faith and Culture is a continuation of conversations between faith, art, and culture started by the Buechner Institute.

The King Institute for Faith and Culture sponsors on-campus convocations (generally on Mondays at 9:15 a.m.) as well as evening lectures either on campus or in community venues, that feature speakers from a variety of backgrounds to examine the ways in which faith informs art and public life and cultivate conversation about what faith has to do with books, politics, social discourse, music, visual arts, and more.

== Notable alumni ==
- Christian H. Cooper – author, trader, and member of the Council on Foreign Relations.
- Patricia Cornwell – author
- Cylk Cozart – actor
- Rodney D. Fogg – General
- Flamy Grant – Drag queen and Christian singer
- Mike Helton – former president of NASCAR
- Sarah Hildebrandt – Olympic wrestler
- William R. Laird, III – United States Senator from West Virginia
- Jason Mumpower – Tennessee State Representative and Comptroller of the Treasury of Tennessee
- Katherine Paterson – author
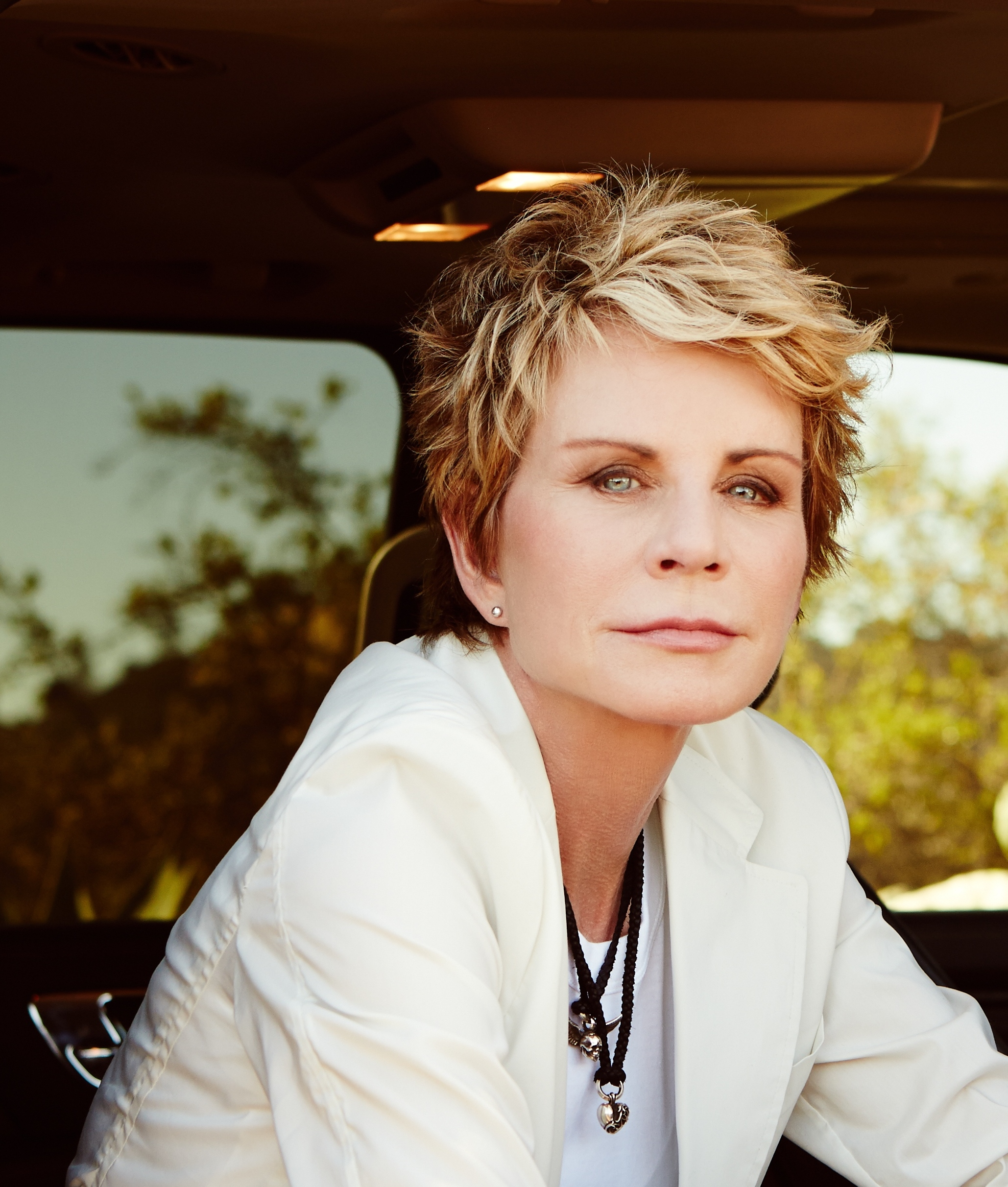
Patricia Cornwell

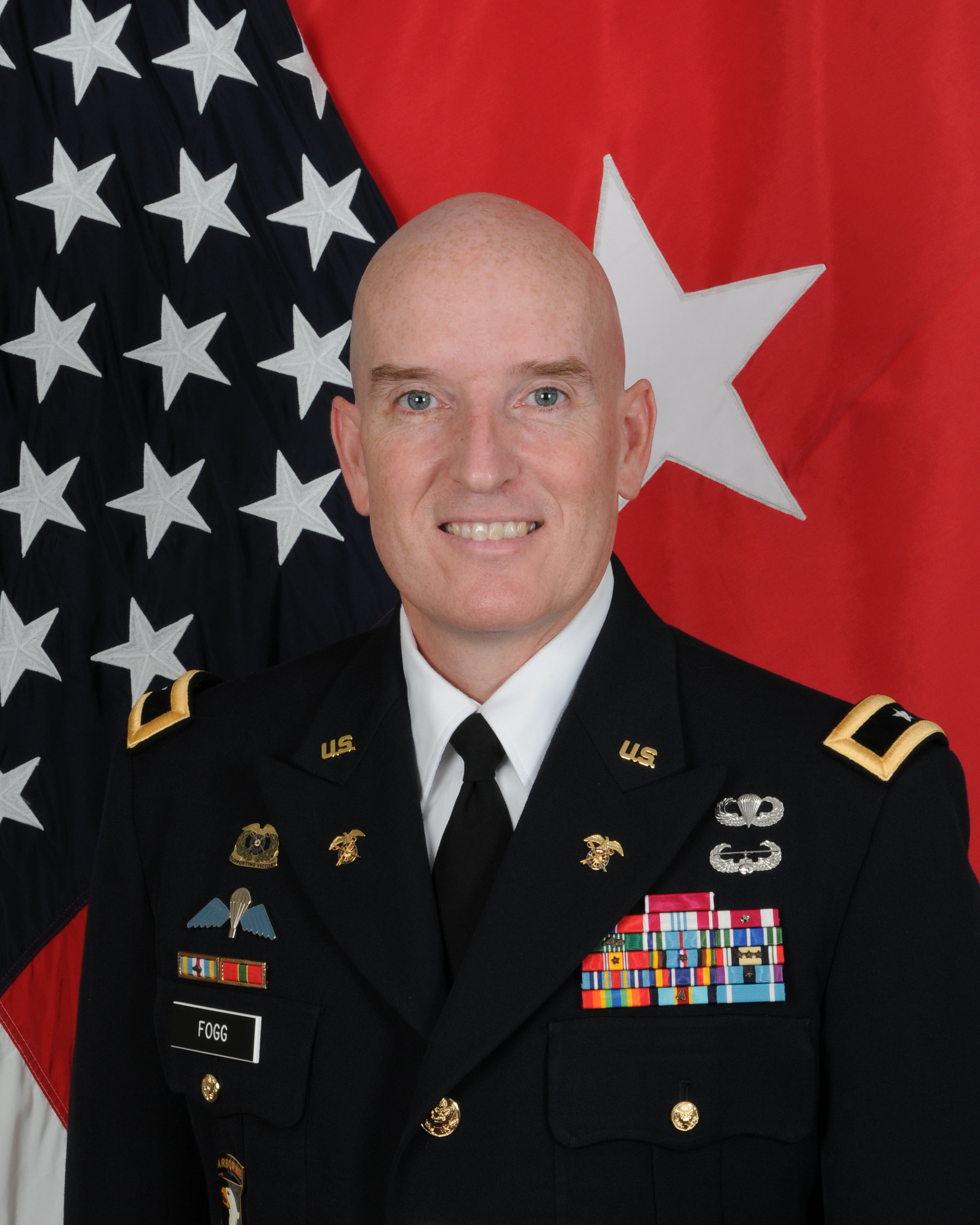
Rodney D. Fogg

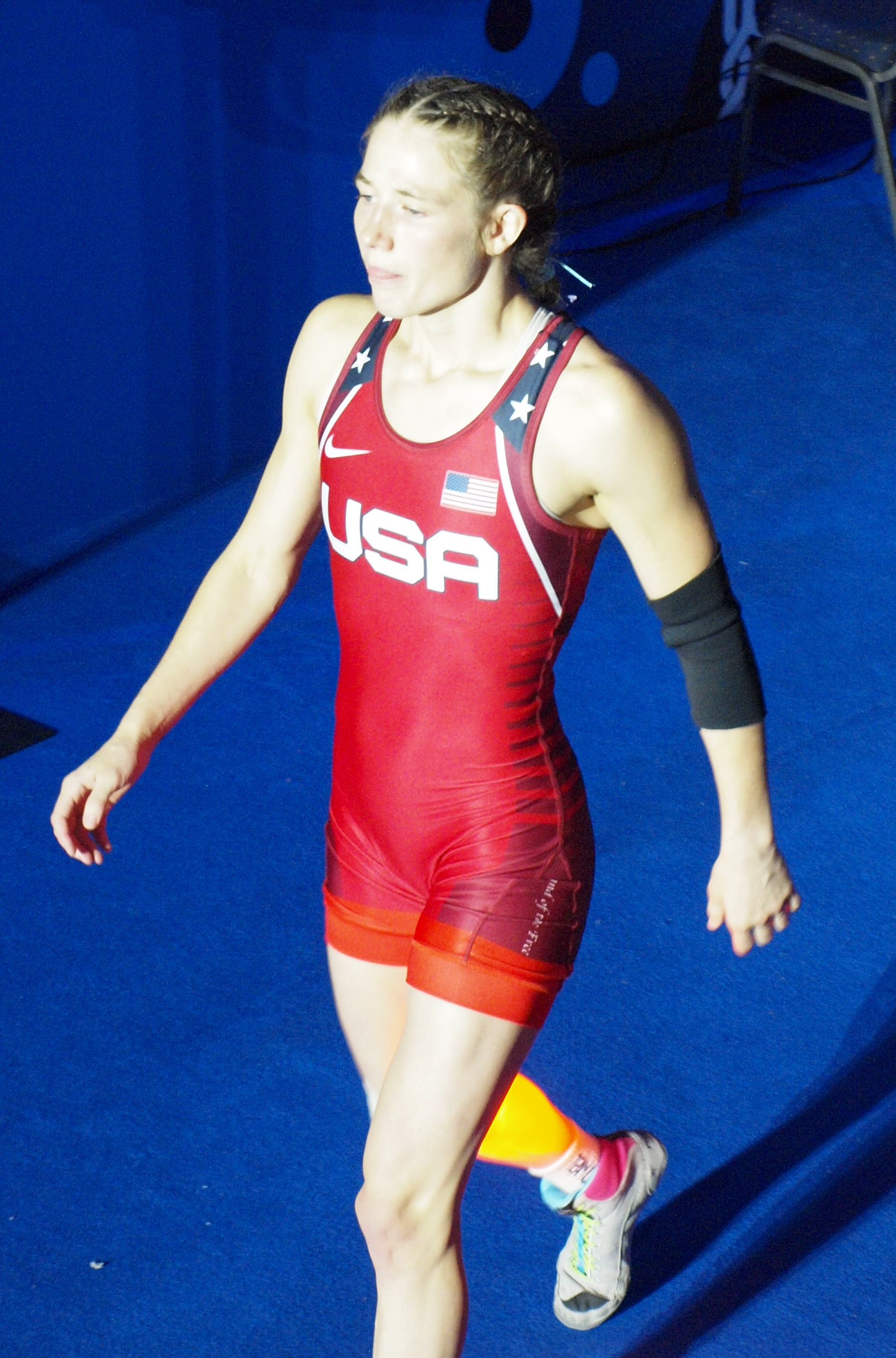
Sarah Hildebrandt

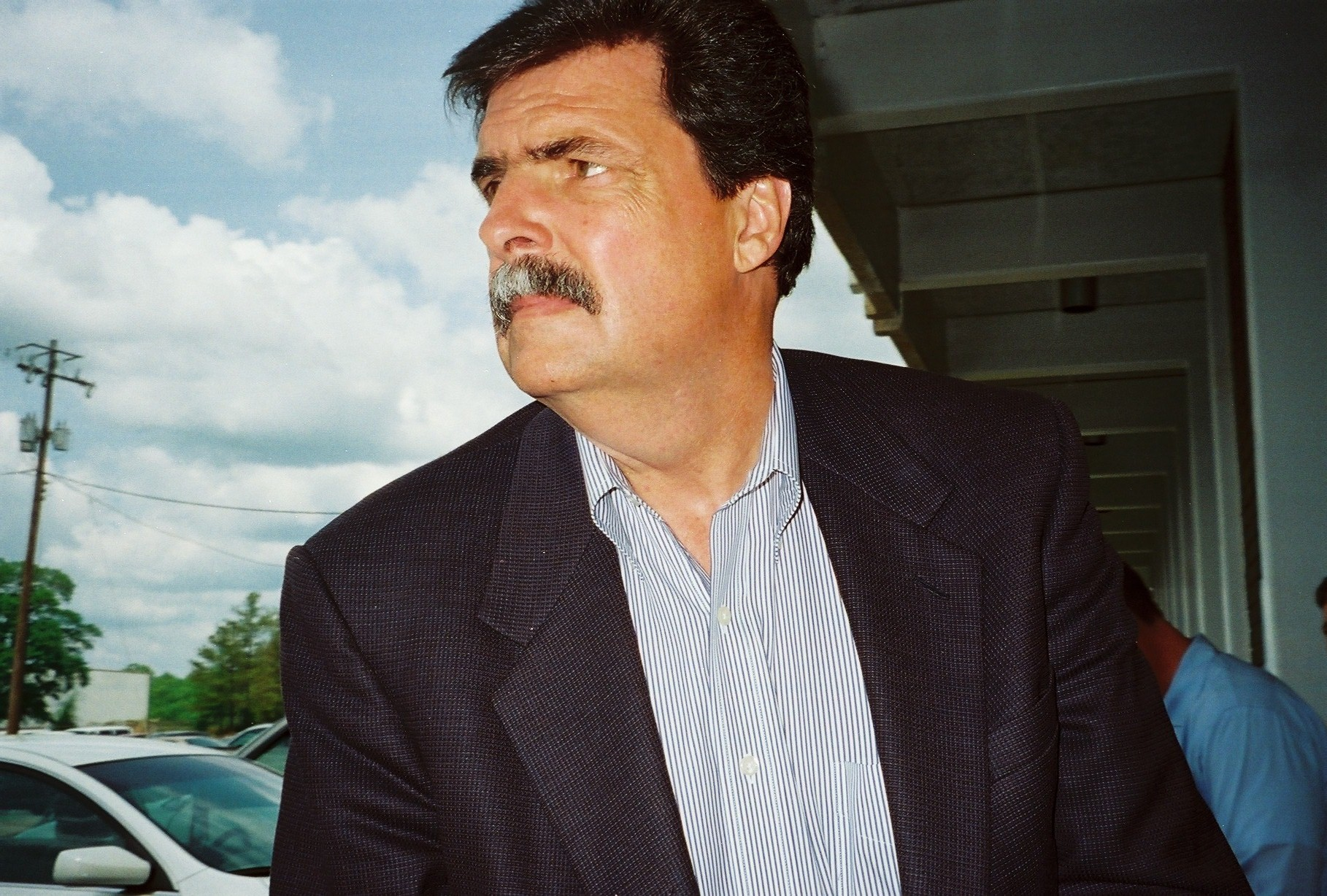
Mike Helton

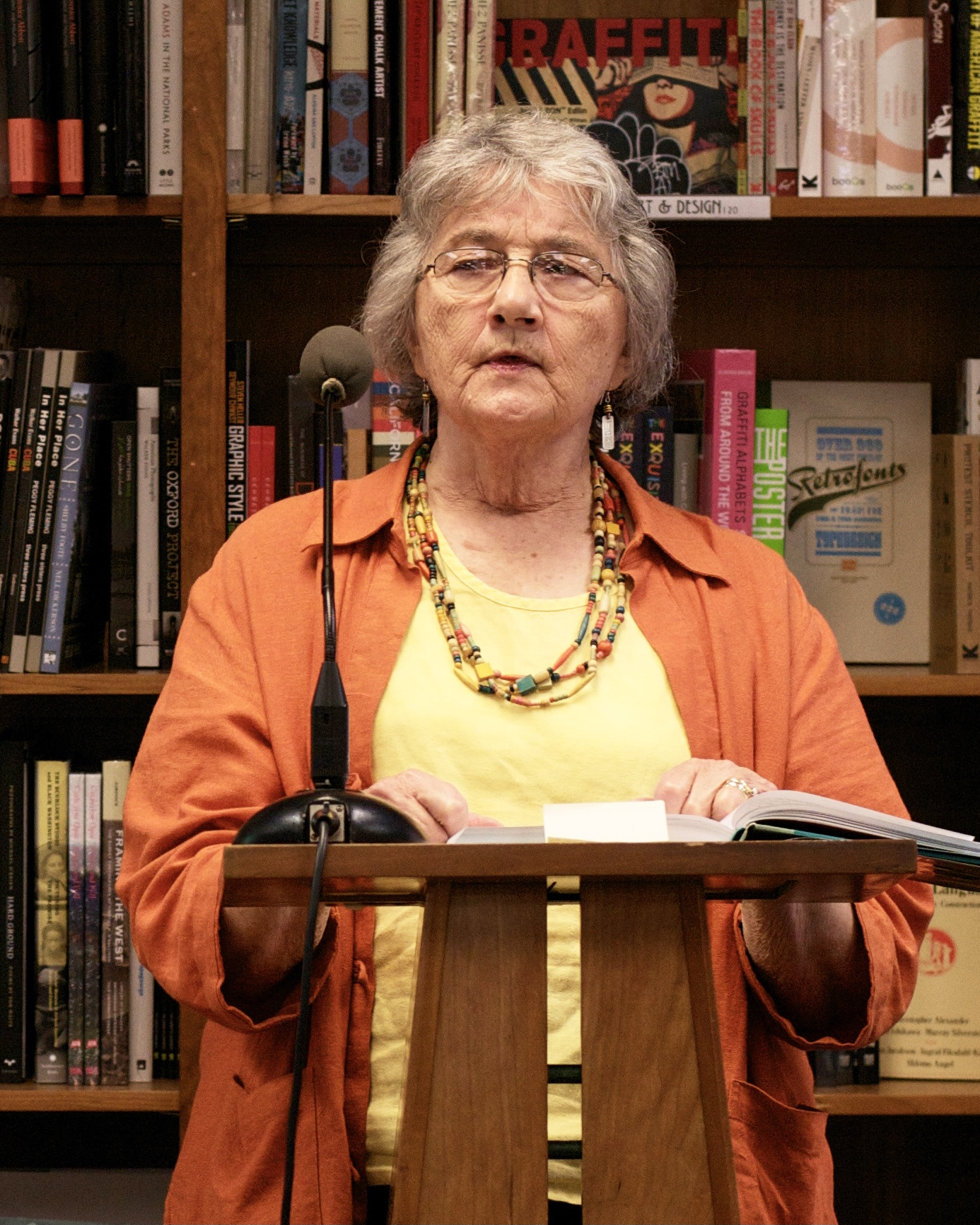
Katherine Paterson
