= Timothy Hill (politician) =

American politician (born 1981)

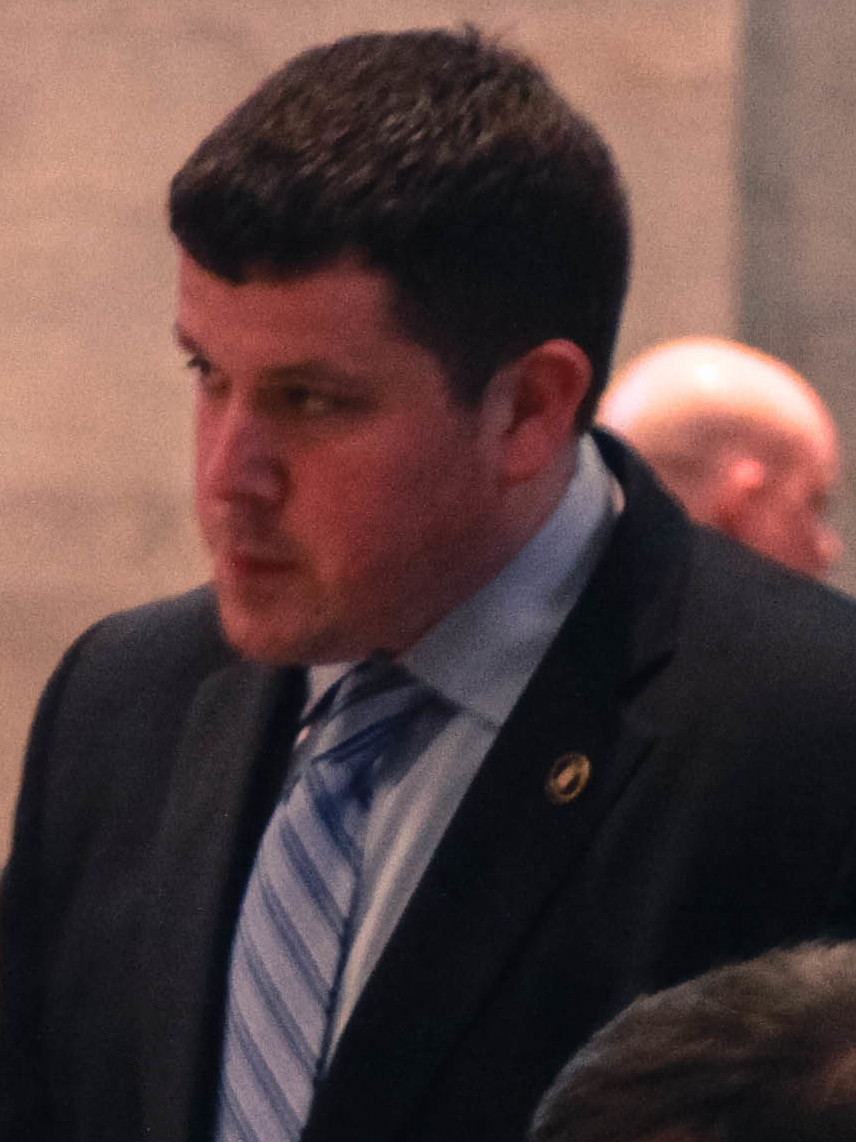
- Hill in 2014

Member of the Tennessee House of Representatives from the 3rd district
- Incumbent
- Assumed office May 11, 2023
- Preceded by: Scotty Campbell
- In office January 8, 2013 – January 12, 2021
- Preceded by: Scotty Campbell
- Succeeded by: Scotty Campbell

Personal details
- Born: Timothy Aaron Hill; November 9, 1981 (age 45) Blountville, Tennessee, U.S.
- Party: Republican
- Spouse: Charity (deceased)
- Children: 2
- Relatives: Matthew Hill (brother)
- Education: Northeast State Community College; East Tennessee State University (BS)

Timothy Aaron Hill (born November 9, 1981) is an American politician who has served since 2023 as the state representative for Tennessee's 3rd house district. A member of the Republican Party, Hill previously served as state representative from 2013 to 2021.

Hill was first elected to the Tennessee House of Representatives in 2012. He was selected by the Republican Caucus as the House Majority Whip of the Tennessee House of Representatives in February 2016, following the resignation of Republican Representative Jeremy Durham.

== Early life and family background ==
Timothy Hill was born on November 9, 1981, in Blountville, Tennessee. His father, Kenneth C. Hill, was appointed as a Tennessee Regulatory Authority director during January 2009 by Blountville resident and Tennessee Lt. Governor Ron Ramsey. His brother, Matthew Hill, serves in the Tennessee House of Representatives.

Hill graduated from Tri-Cities Christian Academy, earned his AS from Northeast State Community College, and his B.B.S. degree from East Tennessee State University.

== Career ==
Before first campaigning for election to the Tennessee House of Representatives, Hill was employed as a talk show host by the 501(c)(3) Appalachian Educational Communication Corporation (AECC) that was managed by his parents and other family members. Hill would later drop his employment with the non-profit AECC and was subsequently employed as a radio talk show host by the for-profit Information Communications Corporation (d.b.a. WPWT 870 AM et al) owned by both his father, Tennessee Regulatory Authority Director Kenneth Hill and the non-profit AECC.

Hill later served U.S. Representative David Davis as a congressional press secretary and communications director in Washington, D.C. He resigned after it was widely reported he used a government computer at the U.S. House of Representatives to remove content pertaining to both King Pharmaceuticals and one of the pharmaceutical company's founders and chief executive officer, John M. Gregory from Wikipedia biographical articles pertaining Gregory's ties to both Davis and his brother, Tennessee State Representative Matthew Hill. Gregory was a major campaign contributor to Republican candidates and conservative causes in Tennessee and donates the rental of office and studio space within his Lietner Pharmaceuticals building in Bristol to Appalachian Educational Communication Corporation controlled by Hill's family members.

Hill is a co-owner since 2009 of the Right Way Marketing, LLC a telemarketing firm with his brother, Rep. Matthew Hill, and was, at one time, the sole owner of the Bonzo's Fireworks stand in Johnson County, Tennessee, Hill also reportedly owned a "boutique" public relations company, Sterling Strategies, that he started up while he was attending ETSU. His brother, Rep. Matthew Hill was among the few customers that Sterling Strategies received any revenue, "$34,430.47 for a variety of campaign services including advertising, professional services, fans, fundraising and radio advertising" from 2008 through 2012.

Hill registered Regional Restaurant Partners, Inc. (d.b.a. Big Bobs Pizza) of Bluff City with the Tennessee Secretary of State on April 28, 2015. Big Bob's Pizza initially had two stores in northeast Tennessee (one location in Piney Flats, Tennessee and the other in Bristol, Tennessee), however, the closing of Big Bob's Pizza store in Bristol was announced on the company's Facebook page on June 30, 2016.

In 2023, after representative Scotty Campbell resigned over being found guilty by an ethics subcommittee of sexually harassing at least one of his interns, the Johnson County Commission appointed Hill to represent the 3rd district, until the special election for the district on August 3, 2023.

== Elections ==
=== 2020 ===
- On March 24, 2020, Hill declared his entry into the race for the United States House of Representatives seat being vacated by incumbent Phil Roe in District 1 in Tennessee.

=== 2012 ===
- 2012 When District 3 incumbent Republican Representative Scotty Campbell left the Legislature, Hill ran in the four-way August 2, 2012, Republican Primary, winning with 2,852 votes (53.2%) and won the November 6, 2012, General election, winning with 16,010 votes (75.3%) against Democratic nominee Leah Kirk and Green candidate Suzanne Parker.

=== 2010 ===
- 2010 When Representative Jason Mumpower retired and left the seat open, Hill ran in the seven-way August 5, 2010, Republican Primary but lost to Scotty Campbell, who went on to win the November 2, 2010, General election.

== Personal life ==
Hill lives in Blountville and has two sons with his wife. His wife died in 2023 from a lengthy health issue.
