= G. Turner Howard III =

American tennis player, distance runner, and road cyclist

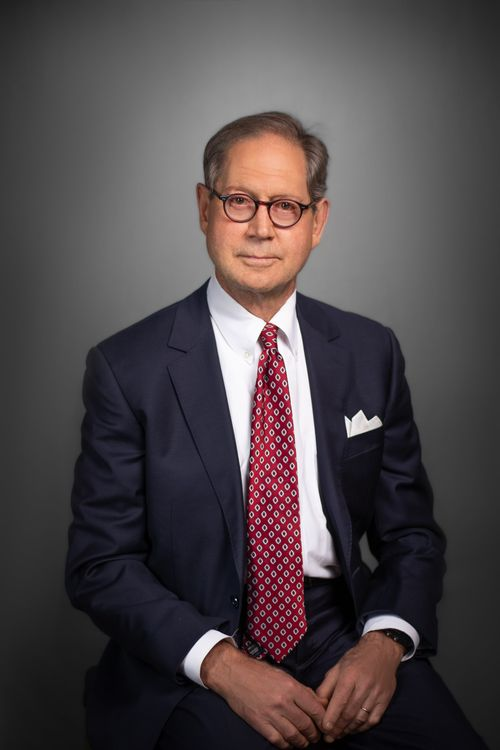
- Turner in 2023
- Born: July 24, 1947 (age 78); Knoxville, Tennessee
- Occupation: Attorney-at-law (2000–Present)
- Family: Wife: Janie

G. Turner Howard III (born July 24, 1947) is a retired American nationally ranked tennis player, appearing at the US Open, who was also a successful distance runner and world class masters road cyclist. He is now an attorney-at-law and the sole proprietor of his own law firm, located in Knoxville, Tennessee. In addition Howard is an ordained Presbyterian minister.

== Early life and education ==
Howard was born in Knoxville, Tennessee, on July 24, 1947. In 1961 Howard enrolled at The McCallie School, an all-male boarding school in Chattanooga, Tennessee. At McCallie Howard developed into a nationally ranked tennis player. He now serves on McCallie's Board of Trustees and was awarded McCallie’s Distinguished Alumnus Award — the highest honor for a McCallie alumnus. After high school, Howard chose to play tennis at Tulane University in New Orleans. At Tulane, he joined Sigma Alpha Epsilon fraternity and continued to compete in tennis. He compiled a 33-1 record and was elected to the First-Team NCAA All-American squad and chosen for "Who's Who Among Athletes in American Colleges and Universities". Howard graduated from Tulane in 1969 with a major in English and a minor in History. Howard was inducted into the Tulane University Sports Hall of Fame in 1999 for his successful tennis career.

Upon graduation, Howard joined the U.S. Army and served as a 2nd and 1st Lieutenant, both stateside and in Vietnam, from 1970-1972.

Howard went on to attend the University of Tennessee College of Law in Knoxville, Tennessee, graduating in 1974 with a Juris Doctor degree. Howard was licensed to practice law in Tennessee and served the Knoxville Bar Association in several capacities. In 1980, he earned his Master of Divinity degree from Andrews Theological Seminary in Michigan, and in 1985, his Doctor of Ministry degree from Columbia Theological Seminary in Atlanta, Georgia.

== Sports career ==
After being honorably discharged from the Army, Howard began his professional tennis career, winning several Tennessee State Championships and the Southern Men's Championship. He was named to the U.S. Junior Davis Cup squad and competed at Wimbledon and the US Open. Howard attained a US Men's Singles ranking in the Top 20 and Doubles ranking in the Top 5 with Tom Mozur. Due to a shoulder injury, Howard retired from professional tennis but soon decided to compete in long distance running. He achieved a 2:38 time in the 26.2 mile marathon and finished in the top 10% of the Boston Marathon. Later, at the age of 50, Howard took up Masters road cycling, winning several Tennessee State titles, gold in the cycling National Championships, and bronze in the U.C.I. World Championships in Austria. Howard was inducted into the Greater Knoxville Sports Hall of Fame in 2000, the Tennessee Tennis Hall of Fame in 2008, and the Greater Chattanooga Sports Hall of Fame in 2012.

== Professional career ==
Howard taught English at his high school alma mater, The McCallie School, where he also helped coach two state champion tennis teams.

He has served for many years as a Presbyterian pastor in the Knoxville area.

Howard founded his legal practice, the Law Offices of G. Turner Howard III, in 2000, and is currently the sole proprietor.

Howard is now listed as counsel with the Garza Law firm.

== Personal life ==
Howard currently lives in Knoxville with his wife Janie, practices law, and remains active in his church and community.
