= Scotty Campbell =

American politician (born 1984)

Member of the Tennessee House of Representatives from the 3rd district
- In office January 12, 2021 – April 20, 2023
- Preceded by: Timothy Hill
- Succeeded by: Timothy Hill
- In office January 2011 – January 2012
- Preceded by: Jason Mumpower
- Succeeded by: Timothy Hill

Personal details
- Born: February 21, 1984 (age 41); Johnson County, Tennessee, U.S.
- Political party: Republican

Scotty Campbell (born February 21, 1984) is an American politician and professional wrestling promoter. He was a Republican member of the Tennessee House of Representatives for the 3rd district, encompassing Mountain City, Johnson County, and parts of Sullivan County.

Campbell first served from January 2011 until November 2012 after the House district seat was vacated by Rep. Jason Mumpower at the end of his last term. In November 2020, Campbell was elected back to the re-districted House District seat after Rep. Timothy Hill declined to run for re-election.

Campbell resigned in April 2023 after a bipartisan committee found that he had sexually harassed interns.

He is the owner of professional wrestling company Beside The Ring.

== Biography ==
Scotty Campbell was born on February 21, 1984, in Johnson County, Tennessee.

At age 17, Campbell interned for Democratic politician Bob Clement. He earned a Bachelor of Science degree from Cumberland University, and studied public policy at Tennessee State University.

Campbell worked as a 911 police/fire/EMS dispatcher, and as a morning radio talk show host at WFHG-FM in the Tri-Cities, TN/VA, region.

He was a member of the Chambers of Commerce of Bristol and Johnson County.

Campbell worked for four years as a legislative staffer in the Tennessee General Assembly for Republicans Diane Black, Brian Kelsey, Debra Maggart, and Tennessee Speaker of the House Kent Williams.

He received anonymous threats during his campaign for the 3rd district. He became state Representative in January 2011. He did not run for re-election in 2012.

Campbell has been a member of the Finance and Health and Human Resources committees.

During a committee hearing on a bill to criminalize drag shows and other "adult-oriented" performances in front of children, Campbell expressed concern that the bill might be too restrictive. "If we're having a professional wrestling show at a county fair, and some promoter decides to have a bra-and-panties match, is that potentially a crime under this legislation?" he asked. Campbell ultimately voted in favor of the bill.

In 2023, the Tennessee House voted on motions to remove three sitting Democratic representatives for disrupting proceedings with a protest as citizens were at the capitol voicing their outrage over a mass shooting at a Nashville school that left six dead. Campbell voted in favor of all three resolutions: HR 63, to remove Justin J. Pearson; HR 64, to remove Gloria Johnson; and HR 65, to remove Justin Jones. Pearson and Jones were expelled, while Johnson was not.

In March 2023, an ethics committee in the Tennessee General Assembly found that Campbell violated the sexual harassment policy after inappropriate conduct with two female interns, which included lewd comments and inappropriate sexual advances. Reportedly, the state spent thousands of dollars protecting one of the victims, including relocating her apartment, shipping her furniture home, and placing her in a hotel for the remainder of her internship. Campbell was only reprimanded for his actions, but resigned the same day WTVF in Nashville reported details of the ethics violations. Former representative Timothy Hill was appointed as the interim representative until the special election in August 2023.

== Personal life ==
Campbell is a Baptist.

On the June 24, 2013, edition of Monday Night Raw, Campbell danced with the WWE tag team Tons of Funk, as the winning bidder for a Hurricane Sandy Relief Fund fundraising auction.

== Electoral history ==
=== 2010 ===
Tennessee House of Representatives - District 3, 2010
Party	Candidate	Votes	%
Republican	Scotty Campbell	10,782	71.7
Democratic	Joe Mike Akard	3,833	25.5
Independent	Parke S. Morris	123	.01
Independent	Thomas White	307	.02

=== 2020 ===
Tennessee House of Representatives - Republican primary - District 3, 2020
Party	Candidate	Votes	%
Republican	Scotty Campbell	6,376	73.5
Republican	Neal Kerney	2,301	26.5

Campbell ran unopposed in the general election.

Tennessee House of Representatives - District 3, 2020
Party	Candidate	Votes	%
Republican	Scotty Campbell	23,878	100

Political offices
Preceded by Jason Mumpower	Tennessee Representative for the 3rd district November 2010 – January 2012	Succeeded by Timothy Hill
Preceded by Timothy Hill	Tennessee Representative for the 3rd district November 3, 2020 – April 20, 2023	Succeeded by Timothy Hill
