= Tennessee House of Representatives 3rd district =

State legislative district in Tennessee

Tennessee's 3rd State House of Representatives district
- Map of Tennessee House districts, with the 3rd District shaded in red
Representative
Timothy Hill; R–Blountville
- Demographics: 91.6% White; 2.2% Black; 2% Hispanic; 1% Asian; 0.2% Native American; 0.3% Other; 2.6% Multiracial
- Population (2024): 67,130

The Tennessee House of Representatives 3rd district in the United States is one of 99 legislative districts included in the lower house of the Tennessee General Assembly. The district represents Johnson County and parts of Carter, Hawkins, and Sullivan counties. It includes the cities of Mountain City, Bluff City, and Mount Carmel. The district has been represented by Timothy Hill since May 2023.

== Demographics ==
According to the 2024 American Community Survey, District 3 had a population of approximately 67,130.

- 91.6% of the district is White
- 2.2% of the district is African American
- 1% of the district is Asian
- 2.1% of the district is Hispanic
- 0.3% of the district is Other
- 2.6% of the district is two or more races

Detailed demographic information on the district is also available through Statistical Atlas.

== List of representatives ==
Representative	Party	Years of Service	General Assembly	Residence
Ralph Yelton	Democratic	1977–1991	90th-96th	Kingsport
Richard Venable	Republican	1991-1997	97th-99th	Kingsport
Jason Mumpower	Republican	1997-2011	100th-106th	Bristol
Scotty Campbell	Republican	2011-2013	107th	Mountain City
Timothy Hill	Republican	2013-2021	108th-111th	Blountville
Scotty Campbell	Republican	2021-2023	112th-113th*	Mountain City
Vacant
Timothy Hill	Republican	2023–present	113th-114th**	Blountville

*Representative Scotty Campbell resigned on April 20, 2023, which was three months and ten days after the opening day of the 113th Tennessee General Assembly

**Representative Timothy Hill, was appointed by the Johnson County Commission to fill Campbell's seat until the special election on August 3, 2023.
