= Tennessee Tennis Hall of Fame =

The Tennessee Tennis Hall of Fame is an organization created in 1992 under the authority of the United States Tennis Association (USTA) which is the national governing body for tennis in the United States. Tennessee is one of the nine states in the USTA's Southern Division, functioning as the "Tennessee Tennis Patrons Foundation" established in 1988. The latter is a non-profit 501(c)(3) corporation governed by an eight-member volunteer board which is responsible for choosing the state's hall of fame inductees. As of 2022, it includes 82 honorees including five-time U.S. Davis Cup member Roscoe Tanner and Great Britain Davis Cup team member Derrick Barton who moved to Tennessee to coach.

== Tennessee Tennis Hall of Fame members ==
- 1992 — Lacy Roe Campbell
- 1992 — Eldon Roark
- 1992 — Pollard Parsons
- 1992 — Reese Patterson
- 1992 — Stanley Ford
- 1992 — Tommy Bartlett
- 1992 — Joe C. Davis Jr.
- 1992 — Alex Guerry
- 1993 — Jeanne Jenkins
- 1993 — Les Jenkins
- 1993 — Tommy Warren K. “Bopper” Clark
- 1993 — John P. "Jack" Murphy
- 1993 — Zan Guerry
- 1993 — Jane Crofford
- 1993 — Alexander Wellford Sr.
- 1993 — Elizabeth Virginia "Eaddy" Dameron
- 1994 — Joe Garcia Jr.
- 1994 — Roscoe Tanner
- 1994 — Nelle Molly
- 1996 — Tommy Buford
- 1996 — Frank Willett
- 1996 — John "Yo" Strang
- 1996 — Peter van Lingen
- 1996 — John Patton Guerry
- 1997 — Bonnie Dondeville-Farley
- 1999 — Howard Z. Blum
- 1999 — Derrick Barton
- 1999 — Brownlee Curry Jr.
- 1999 — Thay Butchee
- 2001 — Phil Chamberlain
- 2001 — Tommy Mozur
- 2001 — Marilyn Voges Brown
- 2001 — Bob Helton
- 2003 — Mike DePalmer Sr.
- 2003 — Bill Tym
- 2003 — DeWayne McCamish
- 2005 — John Beebe Nixon
- 2005 — Dave Mullins
- 2005 — Martha Anne Ferriss Parker
- 2005 — George McIntosh
- 2005 — W. R. “Rogers” McCall
- 2005 — Kay McDaniel
- 2005 — Louise George|
- 2006 — Candy Reynolds
- 2007 — Stephen Lang Jr.
- 2007 — William A. “Billy” Pike
- 2007 — Anne Hutcheson Price
- 2007 — Wesley Cash
- 2007 — Peggy Winningham
- 2007 — G. Turner Howard III
- 2007 — Caroline Haynes
- 2008 — Sue T. Bartlett
- 2008 — Ben Testerman
- 2009 — Jenny Settle
- 2009 — Darrell McDonald
- 2009 — Allen Morgan Jr.
- 2010 — Susan Hill Whitson
- 2010 — Elizabeth Sharp Henderson
- 2011 — Dana Royal Forsyth
- 2011 — Kapner "Cappie" Clark Boles
- 2012 — Fran Chandler
- 2012 — Pat Guerry
- 2013 — William T. Mathes
- 2013 — Alice Luthy Tym
- 2015 — William Dunavant Jr.
- 2016 — Phyllis Taylor
- 2016 — Eric Voges
- 2017 — Ned Caswell
- 2017 — Chris Woodruff
- 2018 — Cindy Kemp Battle
- 2019 — Pem Guerry
- 2019 — Sue McCulloch Webb
- 2019 — Keith West
- 2019 — Mike Hurley
- 2020 — Carla Brangenberg
- 2020 — Chris Brown
- 2021 — John Kreis
- — Charlie Willis
- — Percy Green
- — Clyde McCambell
- — Jane Taylor
- — Nathan Thorpe
