= William R. Snodgrass =

American politician

William R. Snodgrass, Sr.

32nd Comptroller of Tennessee
- In office January 17, 1955 – January 14, 1999
- Governor: Frank G. Clement; Buford Ellington; Winfield Dunn; Ray Blanton; Lamar Alexander; Ned McWherter; Don Sundquist
- Preceded by: Jeanne S. Bodfish
- Succeeded by: John G. Morgan

Personal details
- Born: September 15, 1922; Sparta, Tennessee
- Died: April 20, 2008 (aged 85); Nashville, Tennessee
- Political party: Democratic
- Spouse: Faye Birdwell Snodgrass
- Children: 3
- Education: University of Tennessee (BS)

William Ramsey Snodgrass, Sr. (September 15, 1922 – April 20, 2008) was an American accountant who was the Comptroller of Tennessee from 1955 until 1999, serving 22 terms in that office.

== Biography ==
Snodgrass was born in 1922 in Sparta, Tennessee. He graduated from David Lipscomb College in 1942. He served in the military during World War II, serving from 1943 until 1946. He received a bachelor's degree in accounting from the University of Tennessee in 1947.

Snodgrass was appointed as a research assistant at the Bureau of Business Research at the University of Tennessee in 1947. He was then hired as a consultant on municipal accounting and finance at the Municipal Technical Advisory Service of the University of Tennessee in 1951.

In 1953, Snodgrass began his career in public service when he was appointed as Tennessee's director of Budget and director of Local Finance. In 1955, the Tennessee General Assembly elected him as the state's Comptroller of the Treasury. He was subsequently re-elected every two years and served a total of 22 terms in office. Snodgrass received many accolades and awards during his long tenure of public service. He retired as Comptroller of the Treasury on January 13, 1999. However, he was given the honorific title of Comptroller Emeritus and maintained an office that he regularly visited until shortly before his death.

Due to his long and distinguished career in public service, Tennessee's largest state office building was renamed the William R. Snodgrass Tennessee Tower. The William R. Snodgrass Distinguished Leadership Award was also created in his honor.

Snodgrass died on April 20, 2008, after a short illness. He was survived by his wife, Faye, and three children.

Political offices
Preceded by Jeanne S. Bodfish	Comptroller of the Treasury of Tennessee; 1955–1999	Succeeded by John G. Morgan
