= List of Great Britain Davis Cup team representatives =

This is a list of tennis players who have represented the Great Britain Davis Cup team in an official Davis Cup match. Great Britain have taken part in the competition since 1900.

== Players ==
Last updated after the 2019 Davis Cup.

Portrait	Name	First	Last	Ties	Singles		Doubles		Total		% won	Ref.
Portrait	Name	First	Last	Ties	Won	Lost	Won	Lost	Won	Lost	% won	Ref.
	Bunny Austin (1906–2000)	1929	1937	24	36	12	0	0	36	12	75.00	
—	Chris Bailey (born 1968)	1989	1989	2	1	3	0	0	1	3	25.00	
	Jamie Baker (born 1986)	2006	2011	5	4	4	0	0	4	4	50.00	
—	John Barrett (born 1931)	1956	1956	1	0	0	1	0	1	0	100.00	
—	Derrick Barton (1923–2006)	1946	1947	2	0	4	0	0	0	4	0.00	
—	Jeremy Bates (born 1962)	1985	1994	20	18	18	9	6	27	24	52.94	
	Gerald Battrick (1947–1998)	1970	1971	2	1	2	1	1	2	3	40.00	
	Alfred Beamish (1879–1944)	1911	1920	3	0	0	1	2	1	2	33.33	
—	Roger Becker (1934–2017)	1952	1960	10	10	6	1	1	11	7	61.11	
—	Henry Billington (1908–1980)	1946	1948	2	0	0	1	1	1	1	50.00	
—	Ernest Black (died 1931)	1900	1900	1	0	1	0	1	0	2	0.00	
	Alex Bogdanovic (born 1984)	2003	2008	5	1	7	0	0	1	7	12.50	
—	Neil Broad (born 1966)	1992	2000	11	0	0	4	7	4	7	36.36	
	Liam Broady (born 1994)	2018	2018	1	0	1	0	0	0	1	0.00	
—	Nick Brown (born 1961)	1989	1991	4	0	2	2	1	2	3	40.00	
—	Don Butler (1910–?)	1938	1947	4	0	4	2	1	2	5	28.57	
	Andrew Castle (born 1963)	1986	1990	9	0	5	3	5	3	10	23.08	
—	Lee Childs (born 1982)	2001	2001	1	1	0	0	0	1	0	100.00	
—	John Clifton (born 1946)	1970	1970	1	0	2	0	0	0	2	0.00	
—	Ian Collins (1903–1975)	1929	1930	6	6	0	0	0	6	0	100.00	
—	Barry Cowan (born 1974)	2001	2001	1	0	1	0	0	0	1	0.00	
—	Mark Cox (born 1943)	1967	1979	16	15	6	8	6	23	12	65.71	
	Walter Crawley (1880–1940)	1909	1909	1	0	1	0	0	0	1	0.00	
—	Gordon Crole-Rees (1883–1954)	1925	1929	10	0	2	7	4	7	4	63.63	
—	Peter Curtis (born 1945)	1969	1970	6	0	0	4	2	4	2	66.67	
—	Herman David (1905–1974)	1932	1932	1	2	0	0	0	2	0	100.00	
—	Mike Davies (1936–2015)	1955	1960	15	15	7	9	6	24	13	64.87	
—	Percival Davson (1877–1959)	1919	1919	1	1	1	0	0	1	1	50.00	
	Jamie Delgado (born 1977)	1997	2006	4	0	5	0	2	0	7	0.00	
	Charles Dixon (1873–1939)	1909	1913	5	3	7	2	1	5	8	61.53	
	Laurence Doherty (1875–1919)	1902	1906	5	7	0	5	0	12	0	100.00	
	Reginald Doherty (1872–1910)	1902	1906	5	2	1	5	0	7	1	87.50	
—	Colin Dowdeswell (born 1955)	1984	1986	6	0	2	5	1	5	2	71.42	
—	Cyril Eames (1890–1974)	1928	1929	5	0	0	4	1	4	1	80.00	
—	Chris Eaton (born 1987)	2009	2009	1	1	1	0	0	1	1	50.00	
	Kyle Edmund (born 1995)	2015	2018	5	3	5	0	0	3	5	37.50	
	Dan Evans (born 1990)	2009	2023	11	6	14	0	0	6	14	30.00	
—	Mark Farrell (1953–2018)	1975	1975	1	0	0	1	0	1	0	100.00	
—	John Feaver (born 1952)	1977	1980	2	0	4	0	0	0	4	0.00	
	Colin Fleming (born 1984)	2009	2014	11	1	0	9	2	10	2	83.33	
—	Brian Gilbert (1887–1974)	1923	1925	6	7	4	0	0	7	4	63.63	
	Leslie Godfree (1885–1971)	1923	1927	11	0	0	6	5	6	5	54.54	
—	Josh Goodall (born 1985)	2009	2012	2	0	4	0	0	0	4	0.00	
	Arthur Gore (1868–1928)	1900	1912	3	2	3	1	0	3	3	50.00	
—	Nick Gould (born 1972)	1996	1996	1	1	0	0	0	1	0	100.00	
	Colin Gregory (1903–1959)	1926	1952	15	13	9	8	1	21	10	67.74	
	Charles Hare (1915–1996)	1937	1939	4	3	3	1	1	4	4	50.00	
	Tim Henman (born 1974)	1994	2007	21	29	8	11	16	40	14	74.07	
—	Edward Higgs (?–1950)	1927	1928	6	8	4	0	0	8	4	66.67	
—	Pat Hughes (1902–1997)	1929	1936	21	2	0	13	7	15	7	68.18	
—	Paul Hutchins (1945–2019)	1968	1968	2	0	2	1	0	1	2	33.33	
—	Ross Hutchins (born 1985)	2008	2012	7	0	0	3	4	3	4	42.86	
—	Dominic Inglot (born 1986)	2014	2018	6	0	0	2	4	2	4	33.33	
—	Andrew Jarrett (born 1958)	1981¨	1983	7	1	2	2	4	3	6	33.33	
—	Jimmy Jones (1912–1986)	1938	1938	1	0	2	0	0	0	2	0.00	
—	Algernon Kingscote (1888–1964)	1919	1924	7	7	7	2	2	9	9	50.00	
—	Charles Kingsley (1899–1996)	1925	1931	9	3	1	6	2	9	3	75.00	
—	Billy Knight (born 1935)	1955	1964	21	21	13	6	3	27	16	62.79	
—	Harry Lee (1907–1998)	1930	1934	7	4	5	0	2	4	7	36.36	
—	Martin Lee (born 1978)	2001	2002	3	2	1	0	0	2	1	66.66	
—	Keats Lester (1904–1946)	1926	1926	1	0	1	0	0	0	1	0.00	
—	Richard Lewis (born 1954)	1977	1982	7	6	6	0	0	6	6	50.00	
—	Tim Lewis (1925–2017)	1949	1949	1	1	0	0	0	1	0	100.00	
—	John Lloyd (born 1954)	1974	1986	23	16	19	11	5	27	24	52.94	
—	David Lloyd (born 1948)	1972	1986	15	0	4	9	6	9	10	47.37	
—	Arthur Lowe (1886–1958)	1911	1920	3	0	5	0	0	0	5	0.00	
—	Gordon Lowe (1884–1972)	1921	1925	4	6	2	0	0	6	2	75.00	
—	Randolph Lycett (1886–1935)	1921	1923	3	4	2	2	1	6	3	66.67	
—	Alan Mackin (born 1981)	2003	2006	3	1	3	0	0	1	3	25.00	
—	Miles Maclagan (born 1974)	1995	2003	3	0	3	1	1	1	4	20.00	
—	Donald MacPhail (1910–1997)	1946	1946	1	0	2	0	0	0	2	0.00	
—	Jonathan Marray (born 1981)	2013	2013	1	0	0	1	0	1	0	100.00	
—	Stanley Matthews (born 1945)	1971	1971	1	0	1	0	1	0	2	0.00	
—	Theodore Mavrogordato (1883–1941)	1914	1919	4	5	1	1	2	6	3	66.67	
—	Luke Milligan (born 1976)	1996	1996	1	2	0	0	0	2	0	100.00	
—	Alan Mills (born 1935)	1959	1964	3	2	1	1	0	3	1	75.00	
—	Christopher Mottram (born 1955)	1975	1983	19	27	8	4	2	31	10	75.61	
—	Tony Mottram (1920–2016)	1947	1955	19	25	13	11	7	36	20	64.29	
—	Andy Murray (born 1987)	2005	2023	20	30	3	9	5	39	8	82.98	
—	Jamie Murray (born 1986)	2007	2023	16	0	1	11	5	11	6	64.71	
—	Cameron Norrie (born 1995)	2018	2023	1	1	1	0	0	1	1	50.00	
—	Gerald Oakley (1933–2004)	1953	1954	2	2	0	0	0	2	0	100.00	
—	John Olliff (1908–1951)	1946	1946	1	0	0	0	1	0	1	0.00	
—	Geoffrey Paish (1922–2008)	1947	1955	19	7	16	10	7	17	23	42.50	
—	John Paish (born 1948)	1972	1972	1	0	2	1	0	1	2	33.33	
	James Parke (1881–1946)	1908	1920	8	8	7	0	5	8	12	40.00	
—	Arvind Parmar (born 1978)	2000	2006	5	1	4	0	2	1	6	14.29	
—	Fred Perry (1909–1995)	1931	1936	20	34	4	11	3	45	7	86.54	
—	Mark Petchey (born 1970)	1991	1997	11	1	9	5	2	6	11	35.29	
—	Tony Pickard (born 1934)	1961	1963	5	0	1	3	2	3	3	50.00	
—	Joshua Pim (1869–1942)	1902	1902	1	0	2	0	0	0	2	0.00	
—	Andrew Richardson (born 1974)	1997	1997	1	1	1	0	0	1	1	50.00	
—	Frank Riseley (1877–1959)	1904	1904	2	2	0	1	0	3	0	100.00	
—	Josiah Ritchie (1870–1955)	1908	1908	1	1	1	0	1	1	2	33.33	
—	Arthur Roberts (born 1929)	1951	1951	1	0	1	0	0	0	1	0.00	
—	Herbert Roper-Barrett (1873–1943)	1900	1908	8	0	2	4	4	4	6	40.00	
—	Greg Rusedski (born 1973)	1995	2007	20	20	10	10	3	30	13	69.78	
—	Mike Sangster (1940–1985)	1960	1968	26	29	19	14	3	43	22	66.15	
—	Danny Sapsford (born 1969)	1990	1991	2	2	1	0	0	2	1	66.67	
—	Laurie Shaffi (1912–2005)	1939	1939	2	0	1	0	1	0	2	0.00	
—	Nigel Sharpe (1904–1962)	1930	1930	1	2	0	0	0	2	0	100.00	
—	Steve Shaw (born 1963)	1984	1988	4	2	5	1	0	3	5	37.50	
—	Ronald Shayes (1912–1940)	1938	1939	5	4	6	0	0	4	6	40.00	
—	David Sherwood (born 1980)	2005	2005	2	0	2	1	0	1	2	33.33	
—	Ken Skupski (born 1983)	2010	2010	2	0	0	2	0	2	0	100.00	
—	Neal Skupski (born 1989)	2019	2023	0	0	0	3	1	3	1	100.00	
—	Jonathan Smith (born 1955)	1981	1982	5	0	1	2	3	2	4	33.33	
—	Sydney Smith (1872–1947)	1905	1906	2	4	0	0	0	4	0	100.00	
—	Graham Stilwell (1945–2019)	1969	1969	6	10	2	0	1	10	3	76.92	
—	Roger Taylor (born 1941)	1964	1976	18	26	9	3	2	29	11	72.50	
—	Raymond Tuckey (1910–2005)	1935	1937	3	0	0	1	2	1	2	33.33	
—	Noel Turnbull (1890–1970)	1919	1926	6	3	4	0	2	3	6	33.33	
—	Howard Walton (1916–1989)	1948	1948	1	0	2	0	0	0	2	0.00	
—	James Ward (born 1987)	2010	2015	11	10	9	0	0	10	9	52.63	
—	Patrick Wheatley (1899–1967)	1923	1926	8	10	3	0	1	10	4	71.43	
—	Richard Whichello (born 1967)	1988	1988	1	0	1	0	0	0	1	0.00	
—	Frank Wilde (1911–1982)	1937	1939	6	0	1	2	4	2	5	28.57	
—	Chris Wilkinson (born 1970)	1991	1998	4	2	3	0	0	2	3	40.00	
—	Bobby Wilson (1935–2020)	1955	1968	34	16	14	25	8	41	20	68.33	
—	Max Woosnam (1892–1965)	1921	1924	6	1	1	3	3	4	4	50.00	
