= Ralph Yelton =

American politician

Member of the Tennessee House of Representatives from the 3rd district
- In office January 11, 1977 – January 8, 1991
- Preceded by: Herbert Denton
- Succeeded by: Richard Venable

Personal details
- Born: July 17, 1926 Red Hill, North Carolina
- Died: February 8, 2015 (aged 88) Tri-Cities, Tennessee
- Party: Democratic
- Children: 2
- Education: Eastern Tennessee State University (BS)
- Occupation: Politician; accountant

Ralph Yelton (July 17, 1926 – February 8, 2015) was an American politician who represented the 3rd district in the Tennessee House of Representatives as a Democrat from 1977 to 1991. During Yelton's service, the district included Kingsport and Sullivan County.

== Early life and career ==
Ralph Yelton was born July 17, 1926, in Red Hill, North Carolina to James Monroe and Mae Hill Yelton. He grew up in the Appalachian Mountains on a family farm near Bakersville. At 17 years old, Yelton enlisted in the United States Army to fight in World War II. While serving in the European theatre, he received a Bronze Star.

At the war's end, Yelton returned to the United States and settled in Detroit, Michigan, where he worked at a steel company. However, he was called back to service by the Army during the Korean War. In 1951, Yelton was hit by machine gun fire a few days before his scheduled discharge. The injury, which earned him a Purple Heart, damaged his spine and resulted in permanent partial paralysis. Yelton later characterized his survival as "an anomaly," stating that the life expectancy for paralyzed people had once only been eight years.

In 1954, Yelton moved to Kingsport, Tennessee, where he lived most of his life. He completed his GED, graduated with a BS in accounting and economics from East Tennessee State University, and eventually opened his own accounting firm.

In 2007, Yelton joined the Tennessee Steering Committee to support Hillary Clinton in her 2008 presidential campaign.

== Tennessee House of Representatives (1977–1991) ==
Yelton was first elected to the Tennessee House of Representatives in 1976. He served for seven terms totaling 14 years, from the 90th to 96th sessions of the Tennessee General Assembly. He held several roles during this time, including as the Vice Chairman and Secretary of the Transportation Committee.

== Personal life ==
Yelton had two children, a son and daughter. He was a Baptist, and attended Oakland Avenue Baptist Church in Johnson City. He died in 2015, aged 88.
