= Jeanne Bodfish =

American politician

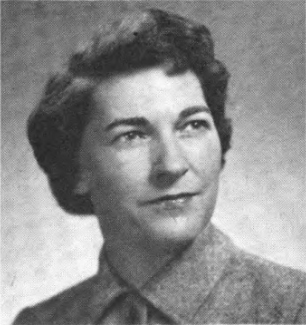

31st Comptroller of the Treasury of Tennessee
- In office January 1953 – January 1955
- Governor: Frank G. Clement
- Preceded by: Cedric Hunt
- Succeeded by: William R. Snodgrass

Personal details
- Born: January 7, 1920; Nashville, Tennessee, U.S.
- Died: October 31, 2012 (aged 92); Nashville, Tennessee, U.S.
- Political party: Democratic
- Spouse: Robert V. Bodfish
- Children: 2
- Education: Vanderbilt University (BA, MA); University of Chicago (JD)

Jeanne Stephenson Bodfish (January 7, 1920 — October 31, 2012) was an American politician who served as the 31st Comptroller of the Treasury of Tennessee from 1953 to 1955.

Bodfish was Tennessee's first and only female Comptroller of the Treasury.

== Biography ==
Bodfish was born in Nashville, Tennessee in 1920 to Margaret and Jay Stephenson. She studied political science at Vanderbilt University and law at the University of Chicago.

Bodfish was a political science instructor at Vanderbilt University from 1950 to 1952.

In 1953, Bodfish was elected by the Tennessee General Assembly to become the Comptroller of the Treasury of Tennessee. She only served one term of two years.

Bodfish died on October 31, 2012, survived by her two children.

== Family and legacy ==
Bodfish married Robert Valentine Bodfish in 1945. They had two children: Jayne and John.

The 108th General Assembly of Tennessee recognized Bodfish's "insightful decisions on governmental accountability" and how they impacted the government of Tennessee for the sixty years following her election in 1953.

Political offices
Preceded by Cedric Hunt	Comptroller of the Treasury of Tennessee; 1953–1955	Succeeded by William R. Snodgrass
