= Roe Campbell =

American football and basketball player (1900–1988)

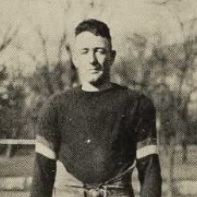

No. 12
- Position: Quarterback/Fullback

Personal information
- Born: January 4, 1900; Washington County, Tennessee
- Died: December 27, 1988 (aged 88); Knoxville, Tennessee

Career information
- College: Tusculum (c. 1919); Tennessee (1920–1924)

Awards and highlights
- All-Southern (1922); Tusculum College Sports Hall of Fame; Porter Cup (1922); Tennessee Tennis Hall of Fame (1992)

Lacy Roe Campbell (January 4, 1900 – December 27, 1988) was an American athlete and banking executive from Tennessee who achieved honors and awards in multiple sports. He played American football and basketball for the Tennessee Volunteers of the University of Tennessee and won the Porter Cup as best all-around athlete at the university. After a successful banking career in Knoxville Campbell became interested in playing tennis at age 48 and pioneered senior tennis tournaments in the United States. He was inducted into the Tennessee Tennis Hall of Fame in 1992.

== Early life ==
Campbell was born on January 4, 1900, to Jefferson Davis Campbell and Louise Truin in a rural part of Washington County, Tennessee. His mother was the daughter of Swiss immigrants and an avid painter. He was raised in Greene County and attended Tusculum College (now Tusculum University) in east Tennessee near Greeenville for one year before transferring to the University of Tennessee. For his performance at Tusculum, he was inducted into the school's Sports Hall of Fame.

== University of Tennessee ==
Campbell played quarterback and fullback for M. B. Banks's Tennessee Volunteers from 1920 to 1924. He also played basketball at UT.

=== Football ===
==== 1921 ====
In 1921, Campbell spearheaded the first touchdown drive of Tennessee's first ever victory over the Mississippi A&M Aggies in a 14 to 7 win in Memphis.

==== 1922 ====
In 1922, Campbell was awarded the Porter Cup as best all-around athlete at the University of Tennessee. He also received votes for All-Southern that year.

=== Basketball ===
==== 1921–22 ====
He played in the first basketball meeting between Tennessee and Vanderbilt.

== Tennis ==
Campbell had a successful career in banking in Knoxville as an executive for Fidelity Bakers Trust and Valley Fidelity Bank. He did not become seriously enthusiastic about tennis until age 48, but took to the game in a big way. In 1960, he and some fellow tennis aficionados in Knoxville (including mayor Kyle Testerman), noticed the scarcity of tennis courts in the city. They purchased land for a tennis club called "Northshore Club" which was later renamed the "Knoxville Racquet Club". Campbell was the first president of this tennis and swimming venue that exists in modern day. Sportswriter Red Bailes called the Knoxville Racquet Club "the birthplace of senior tennis". The first USTA sanctioned national championship for players aged 45 years or older was held there in 1963. This led to the creation of the senior tennis program and its multiple age divisions. In 1992 he was inducted into the Tennessee Tennis Hall of Fame. Campbell died in 1998 at age 88.
