= Derrick Barton =

British tennis player (1923–2006)

- Full name: Derrick William Barton
- Country (sports): United Kingdom
- Born: 26 September 1923
- Died: 11 March 2006 (aged 82)
- Plays: Right-handed

Singles

Grand Slam singles results
- French Open: 1R (1946, 1947)
- Wimbledon: 3R (1946, 1947)
- US Open: 3R (1946)

Doubles

Grand Slam doubles results
- Wimbledon: QF (1947)

Derrick William Barton (26 September 1923 – 11 March 2006) was a British tennis player and coach.

Born in London, Barton competed briefly on tour in the immediate post-war period, playing for the Great Britain Davis Cup team in 1946 and 1947. He was a men's doubles quarter-finalist at the 1947 Wimbledon Championships and twice made the singles third round. In 1947 he moved to the United States and began a career in coaching, first serving five years in charge of the Davidson College tennis team. After this he coached Southwestern (now Rhodes College) in Memphis for two decades, then went into business building and resurfacing tennis courts. He was inducted into the Tennessee Tennis Hall of Fame in 1999.

== See also ==
- List of Great Britain Davis Cup team representatives
