= Joe C. Davis Jr. =

American tennis player and businessman

- Born: Joseph Columbus Davis Jr. June 15, 1919; Cincinnati, Ohio, U.S.
- Died: November 26, 1989 (aged 70); Nashville, Tennessee, U.S.
- Education: Montgomery Bell Academy; Vanderbilt University
- Occupation: Businessman

Joseph Columbus Davis Jr. (June 15, 1919 – November 26, 1989) was an American businessman and tennis player.

== Early life ==
Joseph Columbus Davis was born in 1919 in Cincinnati, Ohio. His father was Joseph Columbus. His mother, Frances Bond Davis, was a feminist activist who supported the Nineteenth Amendment to the United States Constitution of 1920. He had a brother, Rascoe Bond Davis, and a sister, Bond Davis DeLoache. His family moved to Nashville, Tennessee at an early age.

He attended Montgomery Bell Academy, where he started playing tennis. Davis was implored to come to Vanderbilt by Dr. Tom Zerfoss. He graduated from Vanderbilt University, where he won 35 titles, including three Southeastern Conference championships, between 1936 and 1942. He also played on the Vanderbilt basketball team. During Davis' freshman year at Vanderbilt his father died . To support his family, he sold tailor-made suits to fraternities on campus.

During the Second World War, he joined the United States Navy and served as a Lieutenant, participating in the invasions of Sicily, Salerno and Normandy.

== Business ==
From 1945 to 1955, he worked in the coal mining industry under Justin Potter (1898–1961). In 1955, he started his own coal mining business, Davis Coals, Inc., focusing on coal fields in Kentucky, like Justin Potter. Later, he started the Webster County Coal Corporation, which owned the Dotiki Mine in Clay, Kentucky, the most efficient coal mine in the United States at the time. In 1971, he sold his mines to Mapco. It is now owned by Alliance Resource Partners.

He was a member of the Nashville Area Chamber of Commerce.

He sat on the Board of Trustees of his alma mater, Montgomery Bell Academy and Vanderbilt University. He played golf at the Belle Meade Country Club in Belle Meade, Tennessee.

== Legacy ==
He died of Hodgkin's disease in 1989. He was inducted in the Tennessee Sports Hall of Fame in 1976. The Joe C. Davis Professor of Biomedical Science chair at Vanderbilt University is named for him. His niece, Anne Davis, is married to Karl Dean, the former Democratic Mayor of Nashville. Davis is a member of the Tennessee Tennis Hall of Fame.
