= Tennessee Municipal League =

The Tennessee Municipal League (TML) is an association of the incorporated cities and towns of Tennessee, organized for mutual assistance and improvement.

The organization's functions include:

- lobbying the Tennessee General Assembly on behalf of municipal governments,
- working with the TML Risk Management Pool, a cooperative risk-sharing arrangement established to provide liability insurance coverage, and
- working with the Tennessee Municipal Bond Fund, which assists local governments in obtaining funding for capital projects.

== See also ==
- List of state Municipal Leagues
