= John G. Morgan =

American politician (born 1952)

7th Chancellor of the Tennessee Board of Regents
- In office October 2010 – January 2016
- Preceded by: Dr. Charles Manning
- Succeeded by: David Gregory

33rd Comptroller of the Treasury of Tennessee
- In office January 1999 – January 2008
- Governor: Don Sundquist; Phil Bredesen
- Preceded by: William R. Snodgrass
- Succeeded by: Justin P. Wilson

Personal details
- Born: January 4, 1952 (age 74) Nashville, Tennessee
- Party: Democratic
- Spouse: Donna A. Morgan
- Children: 2 sons
- Education: Austin Peay State University (BS)

John G. Morgan (born January 4, 1952) is an American politician who served as the 33rd Comptroller of the Treasury of Tennessee from 1999 to 2008.

== Early years ==
Morgan was born in Nashville, Tennessee, and attended college at Austin Peay State University.

== Career ==
=== Politics ===
In January 1999, the Tennessee General Assembly elected Morgan to be the state's 33rd Comptroller of the Treasury.

In January 2009, Morgan was appointed as Deputy to Governor Phil Bredesen.

In October 2010, the Tennessee Board of Regents selected Morgan as Chancellor.

Political offices
Preceded by William R. Snodgrass	Comptroller of the Treasury of Tennessee; 1999—2008	Succeeded by Justin P. Wilson
