= Jason Mumpower =

American politician (born 1973)

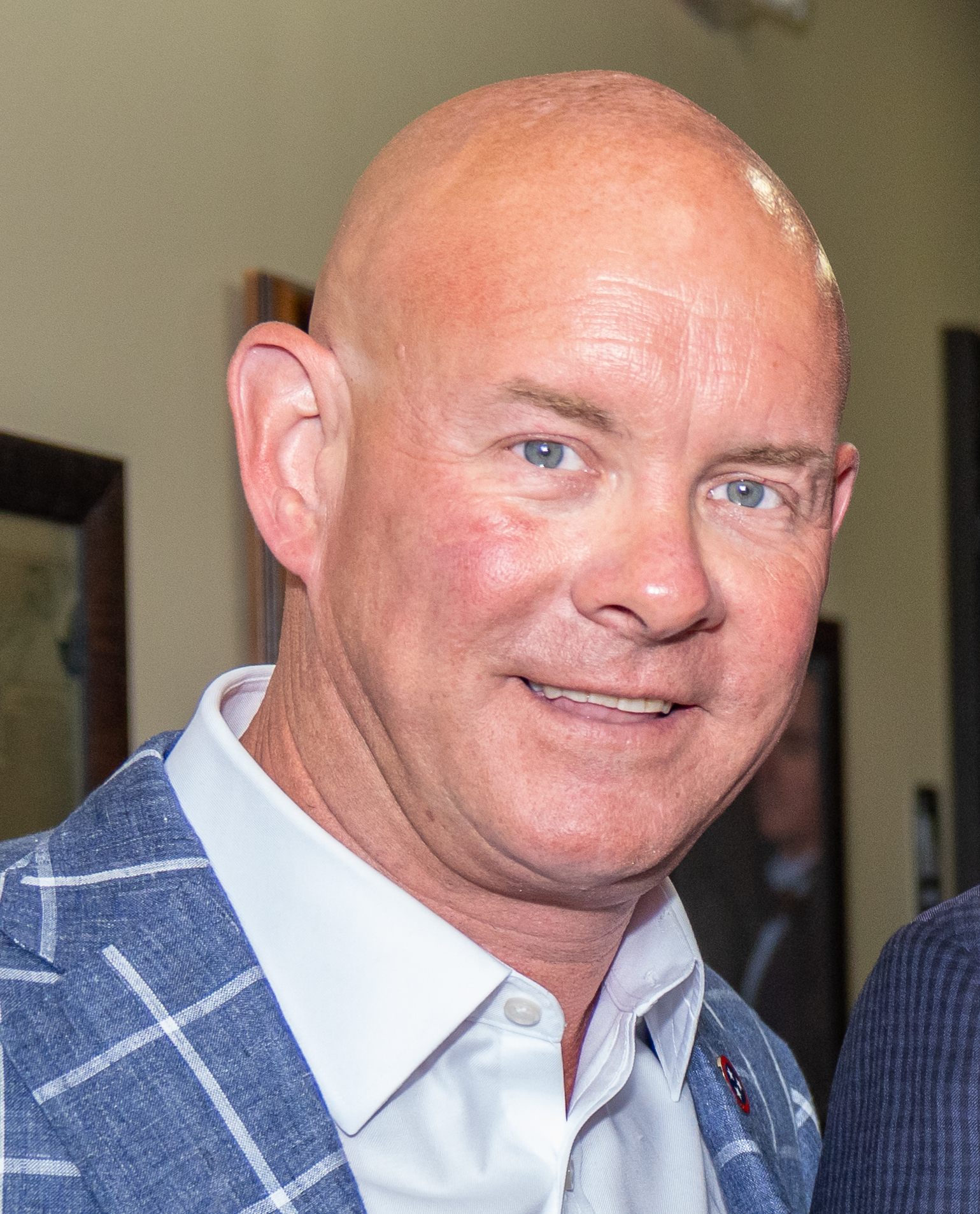
- Mumpower in 2025

35th Comptroller of the Treasury of Tennessee
- Incumbent
- Assumed office January 13, 2021
- Governor: Bill Lee
- Preceded by: Justin P. Wilson

Member of the Tennessee House of Representatives from the 3rd district
- In office January 14, 1997 – January 11, 2011
- Preceded by: Richard Venable
- Succeeded by: Scotty Campbell

Personal details
- Born: September 22, 1973 (age 52)
- Party: Republican
- Spouse: Alicia Mumpower
- Children: 1
- Education: King College (BA)
- Website: Comptroller website House website

Jason Everett Mumpower (born September 22, 1973) currently serves as Tennessee's 35th Comptroller of the Treasury. He was first elected to the position by the Tennessee General Assembly on January 13, 2021. He is responsible for leading the Office of the Comptroller of the Treasury, which comprises 12 divisions and more than 560 employees, and ensuring the Office fulfills its mission to make government work better.

Mumpower first joined the Comptroller's Office in December 2010, serving as former Comptroller Justin P. Wilson's Deputy Comptroller and Chief of Staff.

== Legislative service ==
Mumpower was a member of the Tennessee House of Representatives representing the 3rd District, which consists of all of Johnson County and part of Sullivan County.

Mumpower was first elected to the Tennessee House in the 100th Tennessee General Assembly at the age of 23, and he served as the Republican Majority Leader, a position to which he was elected on December 13, 2006. He was a member of the Health and Human Resources Committee, the Government Operations Committee, and Finance, Ways and Means. He was previously Republican Caucus Assistant Leader.

With the Republicans holding a slim 50–49 advantage over Democrats within the Tennessee House of Representatives following the 2008 state elections, it was anticipated within the TNGA Republican House Caucus that Mumpower would be the elected in 2009 as next Speaker of the House, succeeding Democrat Jimmy Naifeh, who has held the position since 1991. However, Mumpower lost the House Speaker election to fellow Republican Kent Williams of Carter County. Williams was able to secure the vote of every House Democrat, plus his own, to become the first Republican Speaker of the House since 1969.

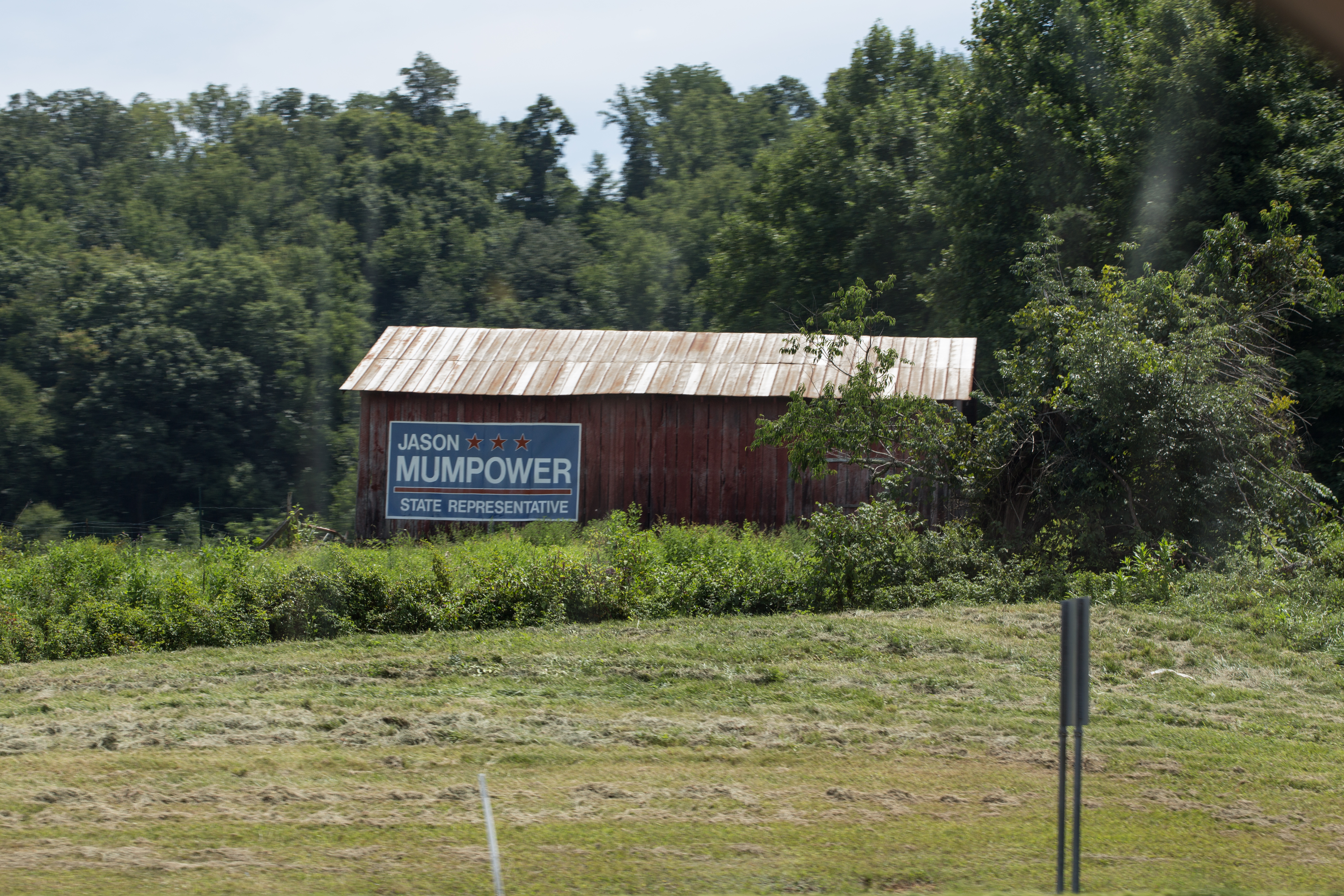
A sign on a barn, near Bristol, supporting Mumpower for state representative.

After serving 14 years in the General Assembly, Mumpower announced he would not seek reelection in 2010.

== Legislative Goals ==
=== 2009 ===
Mumpower co-sponsored the 2009 H.B. 1725 legislation sponsored by his fellow Bristol and Sullivan County member in the Tennessee House of Representatives, Rep. Jon Lundberg (the Tennessee Senate companion bill, S.B 1950 was sponsored by his fellow Sullivan County resident, Lt. Governor Ron Ramsey). H.B. 1725 – subject to approval by the Bristol Board of Aldermen – removes the right of all Bristol voters to participate within ballot questions for recall, initiative, and referendum provisions authorized by the city charter, and was enacted into law by the Tennessee General Assembly and assigned Private Chapter Number 18 by the Tennessee Secretary of State.

=== 2008 ===
Mumpower voted for a measure to lift a cap preventing the construction of toll bridges and toll road projects across Tennessee during the 2008 session. The toll road legislation failed to be enacted by the Tennessee Senate.

== Early career ==
Mumpower was born in Bristol, Tennessee and graduated from Bristol Tennessee High School in 1991, later attending King College in Bristol and graduating in 1995 with a Bachelor of Arts degree in Economics and Business Administration. He is employed by Rep. Jon Lundberg (TN, R-H1) at the Corporate Image, Inc. public relations and marketing firm in Bristol and also by his father-in-law at NWP Real Estate Appraisals of Rogersville, Tennessee, where he has worked as a registered real estate appraiser trainee since October 17, 2007.

Mumpower is also a noted comic book collector in Tennessee, with approximately 36,000 comic books cataloged and organized within his private collection. He began collecting comic books at the age of 12. The Knoxville News Sentinel reported Mumpower as stating that he "read a comic book each night before going to bed", and Mumpower also stated that his current favorite comic book superhero is Spider-Man.

Prior to being elected to the Tennessee House of Representatives, Mumpower bagged groceries at a Bristol, Tennessee grocery store. "I learned more about life working in the Food City than I could learn anywhere else", Mumpower stated in a December 2008 news article in the Memphis Commercial Appeal, "To me, a grocery store is a clearinghouse of life. Everybody has to eat."

Tennessee House of Representatives
Preceded by Ron Ramsey	Member of the Tennessee House of Representatives from the 3rd district 1997—2011	Succeeded by Scotty Campbell
Political offices
Preceded by Justin P. Wilson	Comptroller of the Treasury of Tennessee; 2021–present	Incumbent
