= Will Hogue =

American World Long Drive competitor

Will Hogue (born March 27, 1986) is a World Long Drive competitor. Hogue competes in events that are sanctioned by the World Long Drive Association, which is owned by Golf Channel, part of the NBC Sports Group, and a division of Comcast. The season-long schedule features events airing live on Golf Channel, culminating in the Volvik World Long Drive Championship in September.

Hogue was raised and resides in Memphis, Tennessee, and in addition to being one of the top-competitors in the world, is a full-time paramedic/fire fighter. In an interview with Golf.com, Hogue said, “I’m not a bad golfer, but I’ll shoot 80. I’m your weekend warrior at golf; I play three or four times a year. I’ve got two of my own kids, I’ve got a full-time job [as a firefighter] and I do this. I don’t have time to play golf.”

== World Long Drive career ==
Hogue won three times during the 2018 World Long Drive Association season, including twice live on Golf Channel at the Clash in the Canyon (Nevada) and the Ak-Chin Smash in the Sun (Arizona). He also won his hometown event at the Bluff City Shootout (Memphis) in 2018.

Hogue won two additional World Long Drive events in 2016, which propelled him to the No. 1 ranking at the time.

He first competed in World Long Drive events in 2013.

== Before World Long Drive ==
Prior to becoming a World Long Drive competitor, Hogue played baseball at Austin Peay State University (Tennessee). An outfielder, Hogue led the Governors in home runs as both a junior and senior.
