= Comptroller of the Treasury of Tennessee =

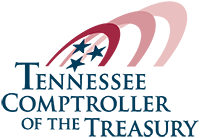

- Flag of the State of Tennessee

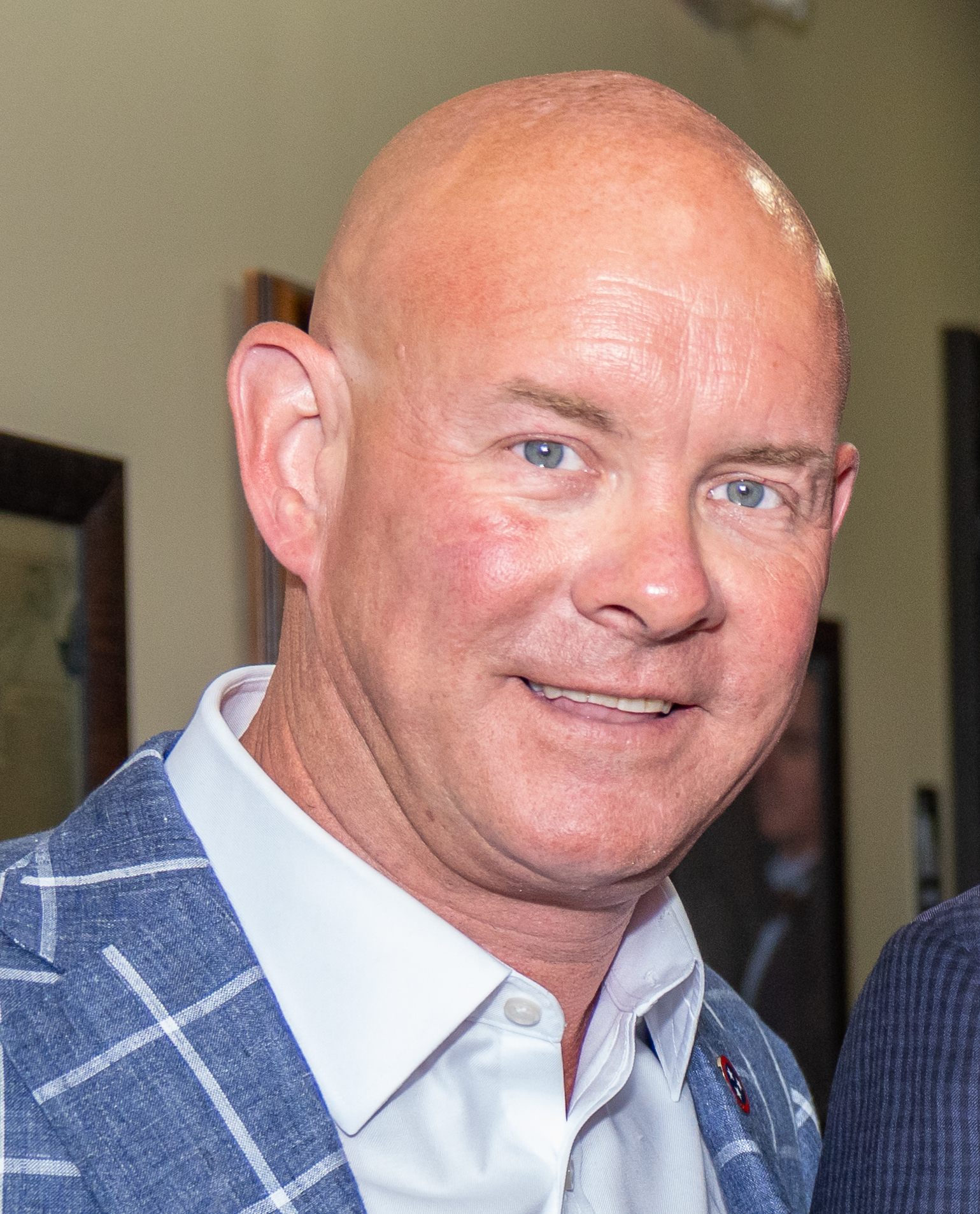
- Incumbent; Jason Mumpower since January 13, 2021
- Type: Comptroller of the Treasury
- Term length: Two years
- Constituting instrument: Tennessee State Constitution
- Formation: 1836
- First holder: Daniel Graham
- Website: Tennessee Comptroller of the Treasury website

The comptroller of the treasury of Tennessee is an office established by Chapter 12 of the Public Acts of 1835-36 of Tennessee's General Assembly. Later, in 1870, the position of comptroller became mandatory by the state constitution. The office has 12 divisions and employs over 560 people. The office's mission to the make government work better. The current comptroller of the treasury is Jason Mumpower.

== Duties ==
The comptroller's duties are governed by statute. The office is responsible for upholding the financial integrity of the state and local governments. It is also to ensure that taxes are properly accounted for and that proceeds are spent as authorized by the Tennessee General Assembly.

== In history ==
=== List of past comptrollers of the treasury ===
The first and only female to hold the office of comptroller is Jeanne Bodfish, serving from 1953 to 1955.

William Snodgrass held the office of comptroller the longest, serving for 22 consecutive two-year terms from 1955 to 1999.

The following have held the office of Comptroller of the Treasury in Tennessee:

Image	Name	Term
	Daniel Graham	1836–1843
	Felix Zollicoffer	1843–1849
	B.H. Sheppard	1849–1851
	Arthur Crozier	1851–1855
	James Luttrell	1855–1857
	James Dunlap	1857–1861
	Joseph Fowler	1862–1865
	S. E. Hackett	1865–1866
	G. W. Blackburn	1866–1870
	E. R. Pennebaker	1870–1873
	W. W. Hobbs	1873
	John Burch	1873–1875
	James Gaines	1875–1881
	James Nolan	1881–1883
	P. P. Pickard	1883–1889
	J. W. Allen	1889–1893
	James Harris	1893–1899
	Theo King	1899–1904
	Frank Dibrell	1904–1913
	George Woollen	1913–1915
	J. B. Thompson	1915–1923
	Edgar Graham	1923–1931
	Roy Wallace	1931–1937
	John Britton	1937–1938
	Marshall Priest	1938–1939
	Robert Lowe	1939–1945
	Jared Maddux	1945
	Sam Carson	1945–1946
	Jared Maddux	1946–1949
	Cedric Hunt	1949–1953
	Jeanne Bodfish	1953–1955
	William R. Snodgrass	1955–1999
	John G. Morgan	1999–2009
	Justin P. Wilson	2009–2021
	Jason Mumpower	2021–present
