= Justin P. Wilson =

American politician (born 1945)

Justin Wilson

34th Comptroller of the Treasury of Tennessee
- In office January 15, 2009 – January 13, 2021
- Governor: Phil Bredesen; Bill Haslam; Bill Lee
- Preceded by: John Morgan
- Succeeded by: Jason Mumpower

Personal details
- Born: January 4, 1945 (age 81) Oakland, California, U.S.
- Party: Republican
- Spouse: Barbara Engelhardt
- Children: 4
- Education: Stanford University (BA); Vanderbilt University (JD); New York University (LLM); Warren National University (MA)

Justin Potter Wilson (born January 4, 1945) is an American lawyer and Republican politician who was the 34th Comptroller of the Treasury of Tennessee. He has been Tennessee deputy governor, a federal judicial nominee to the U.S. Court of Appeals for the Sixth Circuit, and an adjunct professor at Vanderbilt University Law School.

== Early life and education ==
Born in Oakland, California, in 1945, Wilson earned a bachelor's degree from Stanford University in 1967, a J.D. degree from Vanderbilt University Law School in 1970, an L.L.M. in taxation from New York University in 1974, and a master's degree in criminal justice from the unaccredited Kennedy-Western University in 1995.

== Career ==
=== Private practice of law ===
Wilson is a member of the bar in the states of Tennessee and New York. He practiced law with the Nashville law firm of Waller Lansden Dortch & Davis, LLP from 1976 until 1996. He rejoined the firm in 2003 and resigned in 2009 when he became state comptroller.

=== Government service ===
From 1996 until 2003, Wilson was deputy governor to Tennessee Governor Don Sundquist, in which position he was the governor's chief policy advisor. He also served as a commissioner of the Tennessee Department of Environment and Conservation.

As a top policy advisor to Governor Sundquist, Wilson focused on environmental issues. He was honored as the state's Conservationist of the Year in 1997. The Justin P. Wilson Cumberland Trail State Park was renamed in his honor in 2002 in recognition of his environmental work, which included cleanup of pollution in the Pigeon River and negotiating land donations from the Tennessee Valley Authority. He was named the Tennessee Conservation League's "Conservationist of the Year" in 1997. He battled United States Environmental Protection Agency smog rules and toxic waste incineration at Oak Ridge National Laboratory, and negotiated water allocation of the Tennessee River with the TVA.

On January 15, 2009, Wilson was elected Tennessee state comptroller by the Tennessee General Assembly. He was awarded the honorific title of Comptroller Emeritus after retiring on January 13, 2021.

=== Judicial nomination ===
On March 20, 1992, President George H. W. Bush nominated Wilson to a seat on the U.S. Court of Appeals for the Sixth Circuit that became vacant after Judge Robert B. Krupansky assumed senior status. Wilson received a rating of "qualified" from the American Bar Association. Wilson's nomination languished in the Democrat-controlled U.S. Senate Judiciary Committee, which never held a hearing. Wilson's nomination expired with the end of Bush's presidency. Several years later, Judge Karen Nelson Moore was confirmed to the seat to which Wilson had been nominated.

=== Professional activities ===
Wilson is or was a member of the Financial Advisory Board of the U.S. Environmental Protection Agency and chairman of the Nashville Electric Board, Davidson County Metropolitan Health Board, Community Health Agency of Nashville and Davidson County, and the Committee of Visitors of the Blair School of Music of Vanderbilt University. He also has served as foreman of the Davidson County Grand Jury and as a member of the executive committee of Meharry Medical College.

== Personal life ==
Wilson is married to Barbara Engelhardt. They have two sons, Walter and Wesley. Wilson also has two sons, Justin Potter Wilson, Jr and Whitney Danner Wilson, from a previous first marriage to Donna Danner Wilson.

== See also ==
- George H.W. Bush judicial appointment controversies

Political offices
Preceded by John Morgan	Comptroller of the Treasury of Tennessee; 2009–2021	Succeeded by Jason Mumpower
