= Frist =

Frist is a surname. Notable people with the surname include:

- Bill Frist (born 1952), American physician, businessman, and politician
- Patricia C. Frist, American businesswoman and philanthropist
- Thomas F. Frist, Jr. (born 1938), American billionaire physician and businessman
- Thomas F. Frist, Sr. (1910–1998), American physician and businessman
- Thomas F. Frist III, American businessman
- William R. Frist, American businessman

== See also ==
- Frist Art Museum, Nashville, Tennessee
- Frist Campus Center, Princeton University, New Jersey
