= Thomas F. Frist =

Thomas F. Frist may refer to:

- Thomas F. Frist Sr. (1910–1998), American physician and businessman
- Thomas F. Frist Jr. (born 1938), American billionaire physician and businessman
- Thomas F. Frist III, American heir, businessman, investor and philanthropist
