= William R. Frist =

American businessman

- Born: William Robert Frist; Nashville, Tennessee, U.S.
- Education: Montgomery Bell Academy
- Alma mater: Princeton University Harvard Business School
- Occupations: Businessman, investor, philanthropist
- Spouse: Jennifer Frist
- Parent(s): Thomas F. Frist, Jr. Patricia C. Frist
- Relatives: Thomas F. Frist, Sr. (paternal grandfather); Bill Frist (paternal uncle); Thomas F. Frist, III (brother); Charles A. Elcan (brother-in-law)

William R. Frist (also known as Billy Frist) is an American heir, businessman, investor and philanthropist from Tennessee.

== Early life ==
William Robert Frist was born in Nashville, Tennessee. His father, Thomas F. Frist, Jr., is a billionaire who served as the Chairman of the Hospital Corporation of America (HCA). His mother, Patricia C. Frist, served as a director of SunTrust Banks from 2000 to 2010. His paternal grandfather, Thomas F. Frist, Sr., was a co-founder of HCA. His paternal uncle, Bill Frist, served as United States Senate Majority Leader from 2003 to 2007.

Frist was educated at Montgomery Bell Academy in Nashville, where he was a wrestler. He graduated from Princeton University. He received a master's degree in business administration from the Harvard Business School in 2001.

== Career ==
Frist has been a Principal of Frist Capital, an investment firm. He is a general partner of Frisco Partners, another investment firm.

He serves on the board of directors of the Hospital Corporation of America, where he is a large shareholder.

== Philanthropy ==
Frist serves on the board of directors of the Frist Foundation. He serves as the Chairman and President of the Board of Trustees of the Frist Center for the Visual Arts. He also serves on the Board of Trustees of Leadership Nashville. He serves as the Second President of the Board of Trust of the Currey Ingram Academy, a private school in Brentwood, Tennessee.

In 2011, gate 2 of the Vanderbilt Stadium of Vanderbilt University in Nashville was renamed the William R. Frist Family Gate in his honor.

== Personal life ==
He is married to Jennifer Frist. He has been a collector of old photographs since 1993. In 2009, he made headlines for purchasing a photograph of the Upper West Side taken in October 1848, before it was built upon, at a Sotheby's auction for US$62,500.
