= Richard Bracken =

Richard Bracken may refer to:

- Richard M. Bracken (born c. 1952), chairman and chief executive officer of the Hospital Corporation of America
- Richard Bracken (film editor) (1930–2021), American film editor
