= China Health Care Corporation =

Hong Kong health care company

- Type: Private
- Founded: 2005; 21 years ago
- Founder: Charles A. Elcan, Thomas F. Frist, Jr.
- Headquarters: Hong Kong, China
- Key people: Charles A. Elcan (president)

The China Health Care Corporation is a healthcare company based in Hong Kong, China.

== History ==
The China Health Care Corporation or CHC Healthcare for short was co-founded in 2005 by American business executive Charles A. Elcan and his father-in-law, Thomas F. Frist Jr. whose father was the founder of Hospital Corporation of America. Charles Elcan served as its president and Bryan Frist as its chief strategy officer. Charles had previously owned and operated Medcap Properties which sold over 150 HCA operated hospital properties to HCP Inc. in a 575-million-dollar deal allowing Charles the additional capital to invest in China. CHC opened its first hospital in Cixi City in partnership with the Chinese government in January 2014. It was "the first-ever joint venture between Chinese government and a private hospital company." The hospital has 500 beds for patients, and is expected to expand to 600 beds in phase 2. The local government owns 30%, the Frist family owns 70% minus the minority shareholders agreements by CHC executive leadership teams representing 3%.

The first flagship hospital investment was made outside of Ningbo in the Cixi region of China where the Cilin Hospital was built. Cilin Hospital was a greenfield project designed by GS&P that took over the physicians and patients of a dilapidated facility located within the city called Cixi Peoples Hospital 2. The existing conditions for medical care at the hospital where in a third-world state with unsanitary operating conditions and under skilled medical staff. The majority of its income was made by selling medications through the pharmacy. CHC brought in US resources to train and mentor the existing staff as well as define a new healthcare operating model that merged the best of western medical technology and eastern traditional Chinese healthcare. It would eventually facilitate care for over 22,000 out-patients per day and 500 plus ongoing care inpatients. There are 12 operating rooms with an ICU and NICU in the facility. Nuclear medicine and advanced surgical procedures are conducted on a daily basis since its opening.

There existed no software that fit the operating model developed by CHC Leadership. CHC Healthcare's CIO, Mederick Jones created a US$1.2 million project to develop a state of the art bilingual web-based HIS system that included RIS, LIS, PACs, EMR, and HRP modules to run the facility. CHC corporate executive team worked closely with the local Health Bureau and Chinese government to establish a Digital Electronic Personal Health Record ID card and physicians Digital Signature system that would be recognized legally by the Ministry of Health in China. Through these technical developments the hospital was able to deliver a greatly improved quality of care and regional analytics for the Ningbo Bureau of Health that made the CHC operating model unique.

CHC Healthcare was one of the best-funded healthcare startups in China with plans to quickly purchase additional hospitals or put in place hospital operating agreements with tier 2 and 3 public hospitals located conveniently near the high-speed rail systems in China. Five facilities were ultimately purchased and/or operated by CHC spanning 3600 beds before its sale in 2017 to Bain Capital.
