= Charles A. Elcan =

American business executive

- Born: c. 1963; Nashville, Tennessee, U.S.
- Occupation: Business executive
- Spouse: Patricia Frist
- Relatives: Thomas F. Frist Jr. (father-in-law); Patricia C. Frist (mother-in-law); William R. Frist (brother-in-law); Thomas F. Frist, III (brother-in-law)

Charles A. Elcan, also known as Chuck Elcan, (born c. 1965) is an American business executive. He is the co-founder and president of the China Health Care Corporation.

== Early life ==
Charles A. Elcan was born circa 1965 in Nashville, Tennessee.

== Career ==
He served as the Executive Vice President of HCP, Inc. Additionally, he served as the President & Chief Executive Officer of MedCap Properties. He served on the Board of Directors of Kimpton Hotels & Restaurants.

Elcan co-founded the China Health Care Corporation, with his father-in-law, Thomas F. Frist Jr., in 2005. It is headquartered in Hong Kong. Elcan serves as its president.

Additionally, Elcan serves on the Board of Directors of REX American Resources, an ethanol and natural gas exploration company.

With his wife, Elcan purchased the Loveless Cafe in Nashville, Tennessee, in 2003. In 2014, he purchased 30 Music Square West, a former music studio in Music Row, with Mike Curb and philanthropist Aubrey Preston.

== Philanthropy ==
Elcan served as the chair of the Dan and Margaret Maddox Charitable Fund. He also served on the board of trustees of the Tennessee Wildlife Resources Foundation. He serves on the board of trustees of the Land Trust for Tennessee.

== Personal life ==
Elcan is married to Patricia "Trisha" Frist, the daughter of Thomas F. Frist Jr. and Patricia C. Frist, who is the niece of former US Senator Bill Frist. They reside in Belle Meade, Tennessee.
