= Patricia C. Frist =

American businesswoman and philanthropist (1939–2021)

- Born: Patricia Champion; September 28, 1939; Ridgely, Tennessee, US
- Died: January 5, 2021 (aged 81); Nashville, Tennessee, US
- Occupations: Businesswoman, philanthropist
- Spouse: Thomas F. Frist, Jr. (m. 1961)
- Children: Thomas F. Frist, III; William R. Frist; Patricia Frist Elcan
- Relatives: Thomas F. Frist, Sr. (father-in-law); Bill Frist (brother-in-law); Charles A. Elcan (son-in-law)

Patricia Champion Frist (September 28, 1939 – January 5, 2021) was an American businesswoman and philanthropist from Tennessee.

== Early life ==
Champion Frist was born as Patricia Champion in Ridgely, Tennessee in 1939. She was the daughter of Ogden (Harrington) and Garland Ryals Champion.

== Career and board memberships ==
Frist served as the President of Frist Capital, an investment firm. She served on the Board of Directors of SunTrust Bank from 2000 to 2010. Additionally, she served on the board of trustees of the Frist Foundation. Frist also served on the boards of directors of the Friends of Warner Park.

== Philanthropy ==
Frist served as an honorary trustee of the Harpeth Hall School. The Patricia Champion Frist Hall on the campus of Vanderbilt University in Nashville was renamed in her honor in 1998; it houses the School of Nursing.

== Political activity ==
In 1997, Frist donated US$100,000 to the Republican National Committee.

== Personal life ==
She was married to Thomas F. Frist, Jr., a billionaire who co-founded the Hospital Corporation of America. They resided in Belle Meade, Tennessee. They had two sons, Thomas F. Frist, III and William R. Frist, and a daughter, Patricia Frist Elcan, who is married to investor Charles A. Elcan.
