= Jack C. Massey =

American businessman (1904–1990)

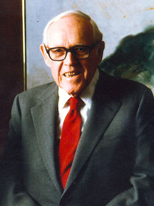
- Born: Jack Carroll Massey; June 15, 1904; Tennille, Georgia, U.S.
- Died: February 15, 1990 (aged 85); Palm Beach, Florida, U.S.
- Education: University of Florida
- Occupations: Venture capitalist, entrepreneur
- Spouses: Elizabeth Polak; Alyne Queener
- Children: 1

Jack Carroll Massey (June 15, 1904 – February 15, 1990) was an American venture capitalist and entrepreneur who owned Kentucky Fried Chicken, co-founded the Hospital Corporation of America, and owned one of the largest franchisees of Wendy's. He was the first American businessman to take three different companies public.

== Early life ==
Massey was born in 1904 in Tennille, Georgia. He graduated with a degree in pharmacy from the University of Florida.

== Business career ==
Massey began his business career working as a delivery boy in his uncle's drugstore. He then received a pharmacist's license when he was 19 and bought his first drugstore when he was 25. He built the store into a pharmacy chain, selling it six years later. He founded Massey Surgical Supply in 1930. He sold it to the A.S. Aloe division of the Brunswick Corporation for $1 million.

Massey acquired Kentucky Fried Chicken from its founder, Harland Sanders, for $2 million in 1964. With John Y. Brown Jr., Massey embarked on a rapid expansion program, growing the business to approximately 3,500 franchises and grossing $700 million in annual revenue. Seven years later he sold the company to Heublein for $239 million.

In 1968, Massey co-founded Hospital Corporation of America with Thomas F. Frist Sr. and Thomas F. Frist Jr. in Nashville, Tennessee. Massey hired the Nashville law firm Waller Lansden Dortch & Davis, LLP to assist with the company's incorporation and later complete many healthcare mergers and acquisitions for several decades. The company became the nation's largest chain of for-profit hospitals and Massey left active management in 1978.

Massey transformed Winners Corporation, one of the largest franchisees of Wendy's hamburger outlets into a major fast-food franchise operation. Finally, he listed Volunteer Capital Corporation (a holding company of Wendy's Restaurant fast food franchises) on the New York Stock Exchange.

Massey was an initial investor in the Corrections Corporation of America in the 1980s.

== Philanthropy ==
Massey was a donor to Belmont University, where the Jack C. Massey Graduate School of Business was named in his honor. He also supported Vanderbilt University and the Montgomery Bell Academy in Nashville. His alma mater, University of Florida, named the Jack C. Massey Professorship Fund for him.

Massey was the founder of the Saint Thomas - Midtown Hospital in Nashville. He was also a donor to the Cheekwood Botanical Garden and Museum of Art and the Tennessee Performing Arts Center in Nashville. Additionally, he made contributions to the Nashville and Palm Beach chapters of Planned Parenthood.

== Personal life and death ==
His first wife, Elizabeth Polak Massey, died in 1968. He later married Alyne Queener. He had a daughter, Barbara Massey Rogers and three grandchildren. He also had an adopted son, Don, who pre-deceased him.

Massey resided in Nashville. He was the owner of "403 feet of oceanfront property directly in front of Mar-a-Lago" in Palm Beach, Florida, which Donald Trump purchased for $2 million.

Massey was a member of the Belle Meade Country Club in Belle Meade, Tennessee; the Everglades Club and the Bath and Tennis Club in Palm Beach, Florida; the Bathing Corporation and the Meadow Club in Southampton, New York; and the Links Club in New York City.

Massey died of pneumonia on February 15, 1990, at the Good Samaritan Medical Center in West Palm Beach, Florida, at age 85. His funeral was held at the Immanuel Baptist Church in Belle Meade, and he was buried in the Mount Olivet Cemetery in Nashville. His obituary in The Palm Beach Daily News called him "a legend in American business."

== Bibliography ==
- Bill Carey, Master of the Big Board: The Life, Times and Business of Jack Massey (Cumberland House Publishing, 2005)
