= R. Milton Johnson =

American businessman and philanthropist

- Born: 1957 or 1958 (age 68–69); Nashville, Tennessee, U.S.
- Education: Stratford High School
- Alma mater: Nashville State Community College; Belmont University
- Occupation: Business executive
- Title: Chairman & CEO, Hospital Corporation of America
- Term: 2014–2019
- Predecessor: Richard Bracken
- Successor: Sam Hazen
- Spouse: Denice Johnson
- Children: 2

R. Milton Johnson (born 1957/58) is an American businessman and philanthropist from Tennessee. He was the chairman and chief executive officer (CEO) of Hospital Corporation of America. With his wife, he has supported his alma mater, Belmont University, where a building is named in their honor.

== Early life ==
R. Milton Johnson was born in Nashville, Tennessee. He was raised by a single mother.

Johnson graduated from Stratford High School in 1974. He attended Nashville State Community College and won a scholarship to transfer to Belmont University, where he graduated with a bachelor's degree in accounting.

== Career ==
Johnson worked for Ernst & Young.

Johnson joined the Hospital Corporation of America in 1982. He was appointed as executive vice president in 2004. He was its chairman and CEO since 2014, and succeeded Richard Bracken, who retired at the end of 2013. Johnson retired from HCA in January 2019 and was succeeded by Sam Hazen.

Johnson was the chair of the board of directors of the Nashville Area Chamber of Commerce in 2017-2018, and was on the board of the Nashville Health Care Council.

== Civic and political activities ==
Johnson is on the board of the United Way of Metropolitan Nashville. He was inducted into the Nashville Public Schools Hall of Fame in 2010. In 2011, he co-chaired a benefit for the Minnie Pearl Cancer Foundation.

Johnson was on the board of trustees of his alma mater, Belmont University, for 2017-2018. With his wife, he donated $10 million to the university for a scholarship program in 2015. The same year, the university named the R. Milton and Denice Johnson Center in their honor.

In 2015, Johnson donated US$1,500 in political contributions to Megan Barry's successful campaign to become Mayor of Nashville.

== Personal life ==
Johnson is married to Denice Johnson. They have two children.
