= Loveless Cafe =

Restaurant in Nashville, Tennessee

Coordinates: 36°2′7.2″N 86°58′19.3″W

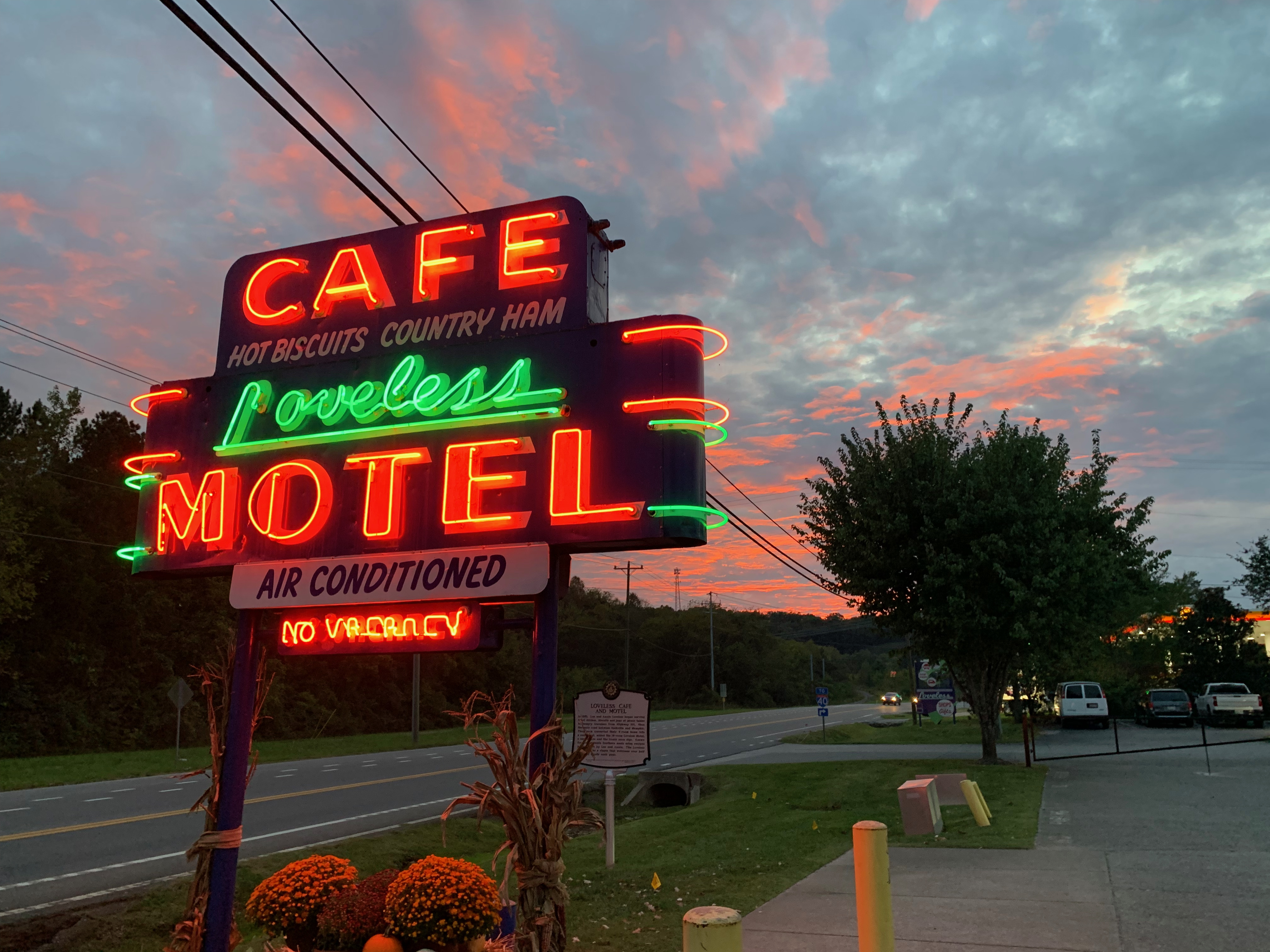
The Loveless Cafe sign

The Loveless Cafe is a restaurant in southwest Nashville, Tennessee, on Highway 100 just east of the northern terminus of the Natchez Trace Parkway. It is known for its Southern cooking, especially for its biscuits, fruit preserves, country ham, and red-eye gravy. The establishment has received acclaim from USA Today, Southern Living, Frommer's, and a number of other prominent national publications. It was purchased by Charles A. Elcan and his wife Trisha Frist, the daughter of Thomas F. Frist Jr., in December 2014.

== History ==
In 1951, Lon and Anne Loveless purchased the "Harpeth Valley Tea Room" on Highway 100 and renamed it the Loveless Motel and Cafe. They originally served only chicken at picnic tables on their front porch, but eventually converted rooms in the house to accommodate a bigger menu and a need for more dining space. They owned the motel and cafe for eight years before selling it to Cordell and Stella Maynard in 1959. In 1973, the Maynards sold the business to Charles and Donna McCabe. Their 12-year-old son George became a full business partner at Loveless in 1982. He expanded the services of the Loveless by creating Loveless Motel and Cafe's "Hams & Jams" mail-order business and catalog.

Motel operations ceased in 1985 and the 14 units were converted into rooms for mail orders, storage and a special dining room. In 2003, the Loveless Cafe was sold to a few committed Nashville natives. They closed the cafe in February 2004 for restorations. The five-month project included a new kitchen, new restrooms and additional seating. The two buildings containing the old motel rooms were converted to Hams & Jams Country Market and the Loveless Motel Shops. The renovation was awarded the Critic's Choice for Best Resurrection of an Institution by the Nashville Scene later that year.

== Awards and recognition ==
=== Print publications ===
Examples of recognition for the Loveless Cafe by national publications include: -USA Today: The newspaper suggested that the "miraculously flaky and feathery biscuits" from Loveless Cafe, were "Nashville's second-most-important contribution to American culture." -People Magazine: The magazine declared the Loveless Country Ham "the best in America." -Bon Appetit: Jefferson Morgan wrote that "On a scale of 1 to 10, my breakfast came in at about a 14." -Southern Living: Told readers that the, "biscuits and gravy are good enough to sing about."

=== Television ===
Carol Fay Ellison, locally known as "the biscuit lady," demonstrated Southern cooking on several television programs such as Late Night with Conan O'Brien, Martha, NBC's Today Show, Throwdown! with Bobby Flay, CBS's The Early Show, and The Ellen DeGeneres Show. Furthermore, the Loveless Cafe was named the "Best Country Restaurant in America" by The Home Show on ABC in 1993.

=== Celebrities ===
Many of the celebrities who have eaten at the Loveless Cafe have left signed photographs which now adorn the entry way. Some of Loveless's fans include Willard Scott (of NBC Today) who stated that the restaurant has the "world's greatest scratch biscuits," and Martha Stewart who said "it was the best breakfast I've ever had." In a volume of Country America, the magazine noted "Al Gore, Princess Anne, and just about any Country Star you could name have all pulled up a chair to Loveless Cafe's red checkered tablecloths."

== The Loveless Barn ==
Designed by architect Seab Tuck, the Loveless Barn is a 4,800 square foot event venue located on the grounds of the Loveless Cafe. It opened in 2009 and was home to the Music City Roots Festival, a live concert series that takes place every Wednesday at 7 p.m.

== See also ==
- List of motels
