= Samuel Pickering =

American academic

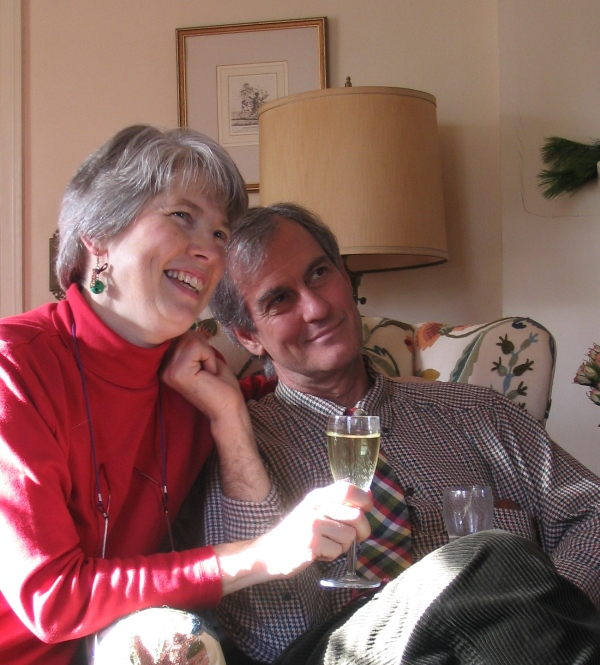
Samuel and Victoria Pickering in 2003

Samuel F. "Sam" Pickering Jr. (born September 30, 1941) is a writer and professor emeritus of English at the University of Connecticut in Storrs. His unconventional teaching style was an inspiration for the character of Mr. Keating, played by Robin Williams in the film Dead Poets Society. Pickering specializes in the familiar essay, children's literature, nature writers, and 18th and 19th century English literature. Pickering has published many collections of non-fiction personal essays as well as over 200 articles.

== Life ==
Samuel Pickering was born and raised in Nashville, Tennessee, where he attended Montgomery Bell Academy. He received his Bachelor of Arts degree (B.A.) from the University of the South and a second B.A. from St Catharine's College, Cambridge. He briefly returned to his alma mater, Montgomery Bell, to teach, a year before attending graduate school, receiving a Master of Arts degree (M.A.) at St Catharine's. He attained a second M.A. and a Doctor of Philosophy degree (Ph.D.) from Princeton University. In addition, he was awarded an honorary Doctor of Letters degree from Oglethorpe University in 2002.

== Career ==
One of Pickering's students at Montgomery Bell Academy, Tom Schulman, later wrote the script for the film Dead Poets Society, basing the pedagogy of Robin Williams' character very loosely on Pickering's eccentric style. Pickering has eschewed publicity raised by the film and has since regarded the unorthodoxy of his classroom behavior as more goalless than that depicted in Dead Poets Society, in which unorthodoxy is employed deliberately as a way to preach the values of non-conformity and carpe diem. Instead, Pickering has commented that "I did such things not so much to awaken students as to entertain myself." Pickering has often considered his teaching style purely purposeless and impulsive, and he criticizes those who have subsequently asked him about his philosophy on education, responding that people, regarding such large social questions, have trouble with "the realization that mostly it's all meaningless. I don't know why people want answers."

Pickering's writing has been characterized as equally sporadic, meandering, and amusing, with a common teaching and writing guideline of "You have to lie to give the illusion of the truth." His non-fiction work typically takes a humorous tone and revolves around the everyday absurdities and pretensions of civilization. Regarding his writing process, Pickering has said:

I tie all kinds of things together because I like to drift. That's the way life is. Some folks don't like that. [...Visiting writer Scott Sanders] talked about all the tools he could use in the books. So, I wrote an essay called "Tool Less" because I can't use any tools. [laughs] So I wrote about that and I proved that the people who couldn't use tools were more flexible. They were very nice people. People who used tools thought that things could be made and fashioned to last. People who didn't use tools knew that nothing lasts so they were not zealots of any kind. He thought I was a complete savage and a fascist at that. [laughs]

Pickering was an assistant professor at Dartmouth College from 1970 to 1978, associate professor at the University of Connecticut from 1978 to 1984, and has been a professor at the University of Connecticut since 1984. A Fulbright recipient, Pickering has lectured in classrooms in Jordan and Syria, and has held research posts at the University of Western Australia as well as the University of Edinburgh. Since the end of 2013, Pickering has been titled "professor emeritus" on the University of Connecticut's website.

== Bibliography ==
- The Moral Tradition in English Fiction, 1785-1850. Hanover: Published for Dartmouth College by the University Press of New England. 1976. ISBN 0-87451-109-7.
- John Locke and Children's Books in Eighteenth-Century England. Knoxville: University of Tennessee Press. 1981. ISBN 0-87049-290-X.
- Children’s Literature. Vols. 8-10 (co-editor, 1979–81)
- A Continuing Education. Hanover: Published for the University of Connecticut by University Press of New England. 1985. ISBN 0-87451-353-7.
- The Right Distance. City: Univ of Georgia Pr. 1987. ISBN 0-8203-0906-0.
- May Days. Iowa City: University of Iowa Press. 1995. ISBN 0-87745-522-8.
- Still Life. Hanover: University Press of New England. 1990. ISBN 0-87451-515-7.
- Let It Ride. City: Univ of Missouri Pr. 1992. ISBN 0-8262-0869-X.
- Moral Instruction and Fiction for Children, 1749-1820. Athens: University of Georgia Press. 1993. ISBN 0-8203-1463-3.
- Trespassing. Hanover: Published by University Press of New England. 1994. ISBN 0-87451-640-4.
- Walkabout Year: Twelve Months in Australia. Columbia: University of Missouri Press. 1995. ISBN 0-8262-1043-0.
- The Blue Caterpillar and Other Essays. Gainesville: University Press of Florida. 1997. ISBN 0-8130-1482-4.
- Living to Prowl. Athens: University of Georgia Press. 1997. ISBN 0-8203-1940-6.
- Deprived of Unhappiness. Athens: Ohio University Press. 1998. ISBN 0-8214-1234-5.
- A Little Fling and Other Essays. Knoxville: University of Tennessee Press. 1999. ISBN 1-57233-062-7.
- The Last Book. Knoxville: University of Tennessee Press. 2001. ISBN 1-57233-147-X.
- Waltzing the Magpies. Ann Arbor: University of Michigan Press. 2004. ISBN 0-472-11377-1.
- The Best of Pickering. Ann Arbor: University of Michigan Press. 2004. ISBN 978-0-472-11378-1.
- Letters to a Teacher. New York: Grove Press. 2005. ISBN 0-8021-4227-3.
- Indian Summer. Columbia: University of Missouri Press. 2005. ISBN 0-8262-1596-3.
- Edinburgh Days: or, Doing What I Want to Do. Columbia: University of South Carolina Press. 2007. ISBN 9781570036910.
- Autumn Spring. Knoxville: University of Tennessee Press. 2007. ISBN 9781572335967.
- A Comfortable Boy: A Memoir. Macon: Mercer University Press. 2010. ISBN 9780881461824.
- A Tramp's Wallet. Macon: Mercer University Press. 2011. ISBN 9780881462357.
- Journeys. Huntsville: Texas Review Press. 2011. ISBN 9781933896496.
- Dreamtime: A Happy Book. Columbia: University of South Carolina Press. 2011. ISBN 9781611170382.
- The Splendour Falls. Macon: Mercer University Press. 2013. ISBN 9780881464498.
- All My Days Are Saturdays. Columbia: University of Missouri Press. 2014. ISBN 9780826220288.
- Happy Vagrancy: Essays from an Easy Chair. Knoxville: University of Tennessee Press. 2015. ISBN 9781621901860.
- One Grand, Sweet Song. Huntsville: Texas Review Press. 2016. ISBN 9781680030952.
- Parade's End. Macon: Mercer University Press. 2018. ISBN 9780881466652.
- The World Was My Garden, Too. Lake Dallas: Madville Publishing. 2019. ISBN 9781948692144.
- Terrible Sanity. Lake Dallas: Madville Publishing. 2021. ISBN 9781948692526.
- The Gate in the Garden Wall. Lake Dallas: Madville Publishing. 2022. ISBN 9781956440102.
- Reading in the Sunshine, Laughing Every Day. Macon, Gerogia: Mercer University Press. 2025. ISBN 9780881469837.

== See also ==
- Dead Poets Society
- Inspirational/motivational instructors/mentors portrayed in films
- 2002, Honorary degree in Doctor of Letters from Oglethorpe University
