= Mrs. Winner's Chicken & Biscuits =

American regional fast food chain

Mrs. Winner's Franchising Group, LLC
- Trade name: Mrs. Winner's Chicken & Biscuits
- Type: Private
- Industry: Restaurants
- Genre: Fast food
- Founded: 1979; 47 years ago Atlanta, Georgia, United States
- Founder: Jack C. Massey
- Headquarters: Atlanta, Georgia, United States
- Number of locations: 3 (November 2026)
- Area served: American Southeast
- Key people: John Buttolph (Owner, CEO & President
- Products: fried chicken • French fries • Coleslaw • biscuits • Soft drinks • coffee
- Revenue: ▲US$5 million (2021)
- Owner: John Buttolph
- Number of employees: 1,000 (Dec 2020)
- Website: https://mrswinners.online

Mrs. Winner's Chicken and Biscuits is a regional fast food restaurant in the U.S. Southeast which specializes in fried chicken. Mrs. Winner's is mostly known for their fried chicken and given away biscuits.

== History ==
Mrs. Winner's was founded in 1970 by Jack C. Massey. Massey's operating company, Volunteer Capital, bought the Granny's of Atlanta chain of 21 restaurants from L.S. Hartzog and renamed them Mrs. Winner's Chicken & Biscuits. In 1982, Volunteer Capital was renamed Winners Corp. and by December there were 64 restaurants under the Mrs. Winner's umbrella. In 1984 the chain boasted a total of 184 stores but by 1989 after four years of losses, the company decided to sell the franchise to RTM Inc., Arby's largest franchisee, for about $30 million.

In 2006, Famous Recipe Company Operations, Inc., owner of the Lee's Famous Recipe franchise, acquired Mrs. Winners. As of August 2007, there were 113 locations in North Carolina, Tennessee, Georgia, Arkansas, Mississippi, and Kentucky. Mrs. Winner's filed for bankruptcy in 2011 after several years of subpar financial performance.

In October, 2012 the “Mrs. Winner’s” trade name, registered trademarks, franchising rights and all related intellectual property rights were purchased by John Buttolph, its former attorney, and a new chapter opened for Mrs. Winner’s. Afterwards, Mr. Buttolph served as the Chairman/CEO of Mrs. Winner’s Holding Company, Inc. and its subsidiaries, Mrs. Winner’s Brand Management, LLC, Mrs. Winner’s Franchising Group, LLC and Mrs. Winner’s Operations for many years, and along with co-owner and COO, Alton Shields, rebuilt the brand. Buttolph and Shields sold Mrs. Winner's and all franchising/licensing rights to A La Carte Menu Services, Inc., a subsidiary of Gourmet Services, Inc., in April 2019.

As of November 2026, three locations remain in Georgia, including East Point.

== See also ==
- List of fast-food chicken restaurants
- List of fast food restaurants
