= Galen College of Nursing =

Private college in the United States

Coordinates: 38.2813°N 85.4976°W

- Former name: Galen Health Institute (1994–2005)
- Motto: We Change The Life Of One To Care For The Lives Of Many.
- Type: Private for-profit nursing college
- Established: 1989
- Founders: Humana Health Institutes, Inc.
- Accreditation: SACSCOC, ACEN, CCNE
- Affiliations: HCA Healthcare
- Location: Louisville, Kentucky, United States
- Campus: Multiple Sites
- Website: galencollege.edu

Galen College of Nursing is a private for-profit nursing college with multiple locations in the United States.

The college is accredited by the Southern Association of Colleges and Schools Commission on Colleges, Accreditation Commission for Education in Nursing (ACEN), and the Commission on Collegiate Nursing Education.

== History ==
The college was established in Louisville, Kentucky, by Humana Inc., in 1989, and was originally known as Galen Health Institutes. The college originally offered only a one-year licensed practical nurse (LPN) program in Louisville, San Antonio, Texas, and St. Petersburg, Florida.

In 2005, the college gained accreditation from the Council on Occupational Education which permits the college to offer the two-year Associate of Science in Nursing degree that enables graduates to become registered nurses (RNs). In connection with these changes, the college adopted its current name, Galen College of Nursing.

HCA Healthcare, purchased a majority stake in the organization in 2020. The school now offers an additional online Bachelor of Science in Nursing (BSN) and Master of Science in Nursing (MSN) programs for RNs who wish to further their education.

In June 2025 the university was placed on Warning status by its educational accreditor, the Southern Association of Colleges and Schools, after the accreditor's board found significant non-compliance with its standards of student achievement and access to archived student course catalogs.

== 2023 NCLEX pass rate ==
Note that not all campus data is published for NCLEX pass rates

- RN
  - Gainesville - 100%
  - Cincinnati - 94.92%
  - Gainesville - 100.00%
  - Miami - 87.37%
  - Myrtle Beach - 93.33%
  - Nashville - 100.00%
  - Richmond - 100.00%
  - San Antonio & Austin 90.34%
  - Tampa Bay - 91.74%
- PN
  - Gainesville - 100%
  - Tampa Bay - 81.82%
  - San Antonio/Austin - 95.5%

== Campuses ==
- Asheville, North Carolina
- Austin, Texas
- Cincinnati, Ohio
- Dallas (Richardson), Texas
- Gainesville, Florida
- Hazard, Kentucky
- Houston, Texas
- Louisville, Kentucky
- Miami, Florida
- Myrtle Beach, South Carolina
- Nashville, Tennessee
- Pikeville, Kentucky
- Richmond, Virginia
- Roanoke, Virginia
- San Antonio, Texas
- Sarasota, Florida
- Tampa Bay, Florida

== See also ==
- Research College of Nursing
