= Princess Grace Hospital =

Hospital in London

The Princess Grace Hospital
- Hospital Corporation of America
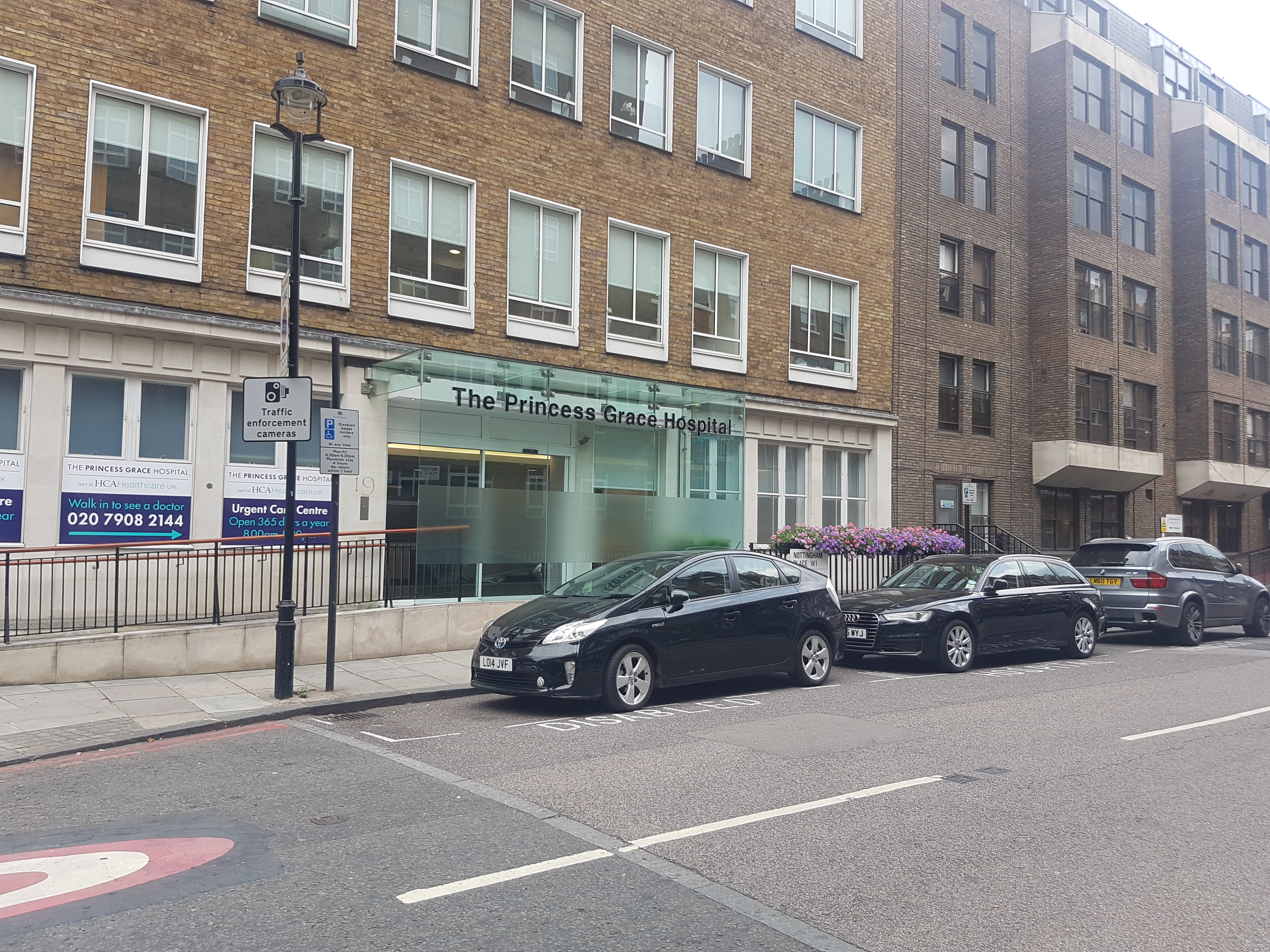
- The Princess Grace Hospital

- Location in Westminster

Geography
- Location: Marylebone, London, England
- Coordinates: 51°31′21″N 0°9′11″W

Organisation
- Care system: Hospital Corporation of America

History
- Founded: 1977

Links
- Website: theprincessgracehospital.com
- Lists: Hospitals in England

The Princess Grace Hospital is a private hospital in Marylebone, London, and is part of the international division of HCA (Hospital Corporation of America), which is the world's largest private healthcare company.

== History ==
The Princess Grace Hospital was designed by Richard Seifert and opened by Princess Grace of Monaco in 1977. The intensive care unit was opened by Princess Caroline in 1983, and the hospital was acquired by Hospital Corporation of America in 1996.

== Services ==
The hospital has introduced many new technologies such as Modic Antibiotic Spinal Therapy, which is used to treat chronic low back pain caused by a bacterial infection in the spinal discs, "Nanoknife", which destroys soft tissue tumours with an electric current, the da Vinci robotic surgical system, which facilitates complex surgery, "SmartPill", which is an ingestible capsule that detects changes in pressure, pH and temperature as it travels through the gastro-intestinal (GI) tract, and vacuum assisted breast biopsy, which is when a hollow probe is guided into the abnormal breast tissue and a biopsy is pulled into the probe and cut off.

In recent years, the hospital has grown from its main base on Nottingham Place, a few blocks west of Harley Street. The hospital has worked in partnership with the NHS and other stakeholders to develop the Institute of Sport Exercise and Health. This centre specialises in sports and exercise medicine and offers treatment to both elite sports professionals as well as those who only partake in sport at the weekend.

== See also ==
- List of hospitals in England
