= Whitland Area Neighborhood =

Historic district in Nashville, Tennessee

- U.S. National Register of Historic Places
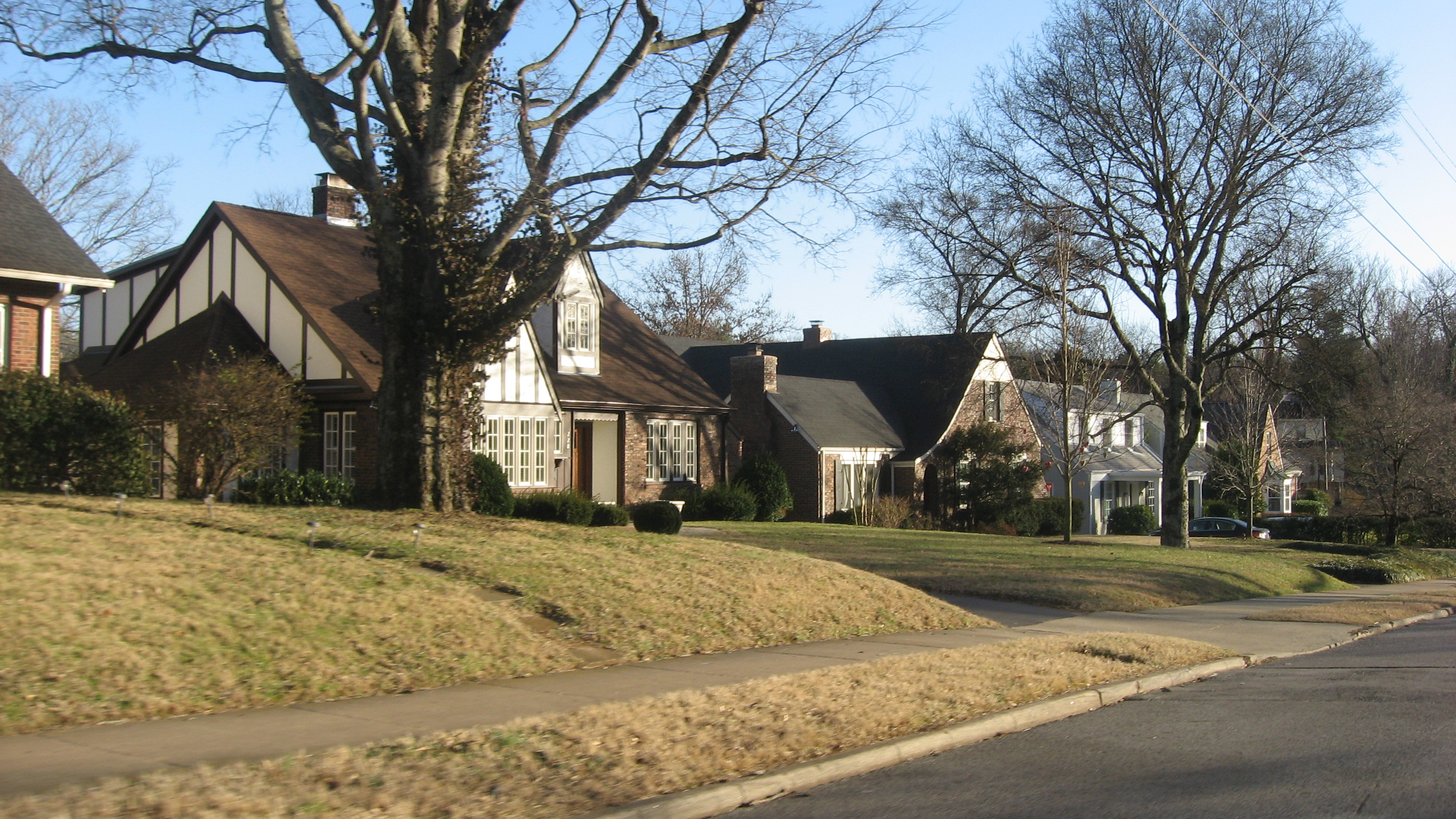
- Leonard north of Rolland, Whitland Neighborhood

- Location within Tennessee Location within the United States
- Location: Nashville, Tennessee
- Coordinates: 36.129167°N 86.828889°W
- Built: 1900–1974
- Architect: Multiple
- Architectural style: Colonial Revival architecture; Tudor architecture
- Website: whitland.org
- NRHP reference No.: 07000763
- Added to NRHP: July 24, 2007

Whitland Area Neighborhood is a historic neighborhood in Nashville, Tennessee. It was listed on the National Register of Historic Places listings in Davidson County, Tennessee (NRHP) on July 24, 2007.

== History ==
The neighborhood was developed in the 1920s and is approximately 15 minutes from downtown Nashville. The private boys school Montgomery Bell Academy, and Elmington Park are both in the neighborhood. The neighborhood boundaries are Whitland Avenue to Bowling Ave and S. Wilson Boulevard, to Richland Creek. In 1980 John walker established a nonprofit organization called the Whitland Area Neighborhood Association. The mission of the association was to create a sense of community, prevent crime, beautify the area, control traffic, and deal with zoning issues. The association also coordinates events and holds regular meetings and social gatherings.
