= John Warner White =

American Army Air Forces Major (1921–2019)

- John Warner White, ca. 1943
- Born: July 4, 1921; Nashville, Tennessee
- Died: July 12, 2010 (aged 89); Nashville, Tennessee
- Military career
- Branch: US Army Air Forces
- Service years: 1942–1946
- Rank: Major
- Conflicts: Tunisian campaign Allied invasion of Sicily; Italian campaign (World War II)

John Warner White (1921–2010) was an American Army Air Forces Major who completed fifty bombing missions in 1943 in the Allies' Tunisian, Sicilian, and Italian Campaigns of World War II. As a first lieutenant in the 487th Bombardment Squadron, he flew many raids as lead bombardier facing enemy fighter aircraft and concentrated anti-aircraft fire which caused frequent casualties. Decades after the war's end, White published a personal narrative about his wartime experiences entitled "Tuff Stuffː Memoirs of John Warner White". The title Tuff Stuff refers to the name given to the B–25 bomber flown by White's six-man crew. The information below draws heavily on White's account of what he experienced from 1941 to 1944.

== Early life ==
White was born into a prosperous and well-connected family in Nashville, Tennessee, where a major public park is named for his grandfather Percy Warner. His uncle, Luke Lea, was a US Senator from Tennessee. His great-grandfather, James Cartwright Warner, was the mayor of Chattanooga, Tennessee in 1861 but moved to Nashville when the Civil War broke out.

White was born at a large quarried-stone house built by his grandparents, Margaret and Percy Warner, called "Royal Oaks", a 32-acre (13 ha) estate off Nashville's West End Avenue. The estate, in White's words, "had a house full of servants". He was driven to primary school by the family chauffeur. He attended Nashville's Montgomery Bell Academy, then St. John's Military Academy in Wisconsin. At age 19, while he was a student at the University of North Carolina, World War II was raging in Europe. White and his Phi Delta Theta fraternity brothers spent much of their time gathered by the radio at the fraternity house closely following the early stages of the war, particularly the Battle of Britain. White became dedicated to defending England in any way possible. He was well aware of the inevitability of the US becoming involved in the war and became interested in the Army Air Corps. At age 20, he was the first person to enlist at an Army Air Corps recruiting station on July 10, 1941, in downtown Nashville . A news photographer snapped a picture of White being interviewed by the recruiting officer, published in the Tennessean the following day. White was initially rejected for service for being underweight. His height was 6 feet 2 inches (1.88 m) and he weighed only 120 pounds (54 kg). He had to re-apply and was accepted after gaining 6 pounds (2.7 kg).

== Military training ==
Tuff Stuff: Memoirs of John Warner White

Along with thousands of young men his age, White received orders to report to Alabama's Maxwell Field, a massive training center with hundreds of two-story white wooden barracks. He underwent instruction and testing and was eventually assigned to bombardier/navigator school. He spent months of training in Arizona, which included learning to use the top secret Norden bombsight, a gyroscopic device that could provide high accuracy in placing bombs. After receiving his commission as a Second Lieutenant, he was sent to South Carolina where men of different Air Corps specialties were put together to form bomber crews. A crew typically consisted of a pilot, a co-pilot, and a bombardier/navigator, who were officers, and two gunners and a radio operator, who were enlisted men. White and his crew embarked on training missions, striking practice targets in both day and night bombing simulations over the southeastern US. At the completion of their training, they were sent north on a long train journey to Michigan with many similar crews to pick up a total of 36 newly minted B–25 bombers near the factory where they were built. When they arrived in Michigan they encountered three feet of snow which made flying impossible for several days. Passing time, White won $200 in a card game and took his crew members to Chicago to the Palmer House Hotel, where they received greatly-discounted rooms. Entering a nearby club, they heard a fine orchestra, led by noted bandleader Gene Krupa, who came to their table to sit with them and ask about what they were doing.

These 36 new bombers were to be flown to Florida, their point of departure before flying to combat in North Africa. White's crew agreed on the name for their aircraft, "Tuff Stuff " (Note: The name refers to an imaginary "TS Card" for soldiers who had a gripe or complaint. The joke was that no actual card existed; it was a way to say "it's just too bad" or more commonly, "Tough Shit" (TS). The hoax was often perpetrated on new recruits: "Take your TS card to have it punched". The Chaplains began to print actual TS cards, encouraging personnel to visit them for emotional problems, but the army put a stop to it. White's crew liked the joke, but couldn't put such vulgarity on the side of the plane; so, they softened it to "Tuff Stuff".) and had it painted on the front of the plane. They were each issued a .45-automatic sidearm with leather holster. On February 18, 1943, White's squadron left Morrison Field in West Palm Beach with fourteen B–25 bombers and crews headed for North Africa.

== Being bombardier ==
After a voyage through the Caribbean, South America, and Egypt, the B–25 bombers reached North Africa and were ready to begin combat missions. There were four squadrons, each containing about 25 bombers; White's squadron was the 487th Bombardment Squadron. The various squadrons were separated into widely spaced quadrants around the runway to minimize losses in case of enemy strafing or bombing.

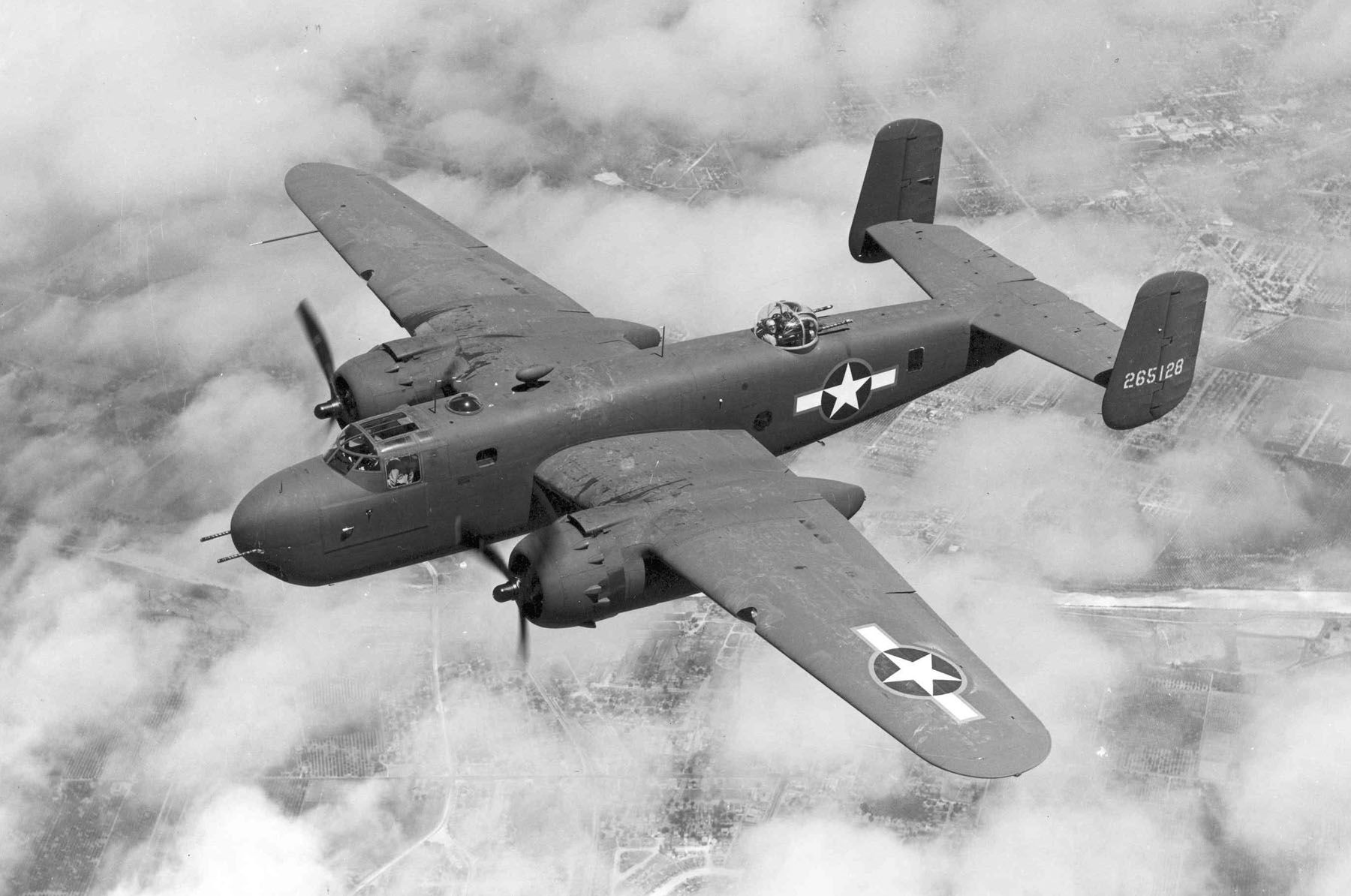
North American B–25 Mitchell

By the spring of 1943 German troops had retreated westward all the way across North Africa and now were into the northwest corner of Tunisia. White's crew was ordered to destroy a heavily defended airfield in the city of Tunis which was a crucial supply line for the enemy. White's squadron was encamped about 170 miles (270 km) south of this target in what White called "just a big open piece of ground". Rather that sleep in tents, his crew found an abandoned Arab block house about 30 feet square (900 ft^{2} or 84 m^{2}) with one door in front. They moved their cots into it and decorated the doorway with a long chain of machine gun bullets in casings. From a makeshift platform nearby, White was able to observe dozens of other squadrons' bombers come and go, and this was not always reassuring. Some came in badly damaged from anti-aircraft fire, and he witnessed one plane crashing on take-off when one engine failed causing the plane to roll over. When a tragedy such as this occurred, the airmen never went to the crash site; that task was done by another military section. Funerals were held on base.

Just a few days before White's crew had arrived, two B–25s in the squadron bumped together while flying in formation and the impact caused the bombs on both planes to detonate prematurely, killing both crews. White's crew was replacing them. On one of their early missions, White's ship (they used the word "ship" instead of "plane") was readied and eight 250 pound bombs were loaded in the bomb bay on parallel racks. The bombardier (White) sat in the very front of the ship in a viewing compartment with a mounted machine gun. (see photo). When the mission began, White armed each bomb by removing a protective pin across a plunger located on the tip of each bomb. The plunger was the bomb's detonator and was dangerously unpredictable; jostling could cause it to detonate, as had just happened in two other planes within the previous month. As White's crew flew toward its target, the co-pilot reported that one engine was overheating to a dangerous level. They had to break formation to return to the base. This was the first aborted mission they had encountered or even heard about, and they did not know what to do about the armed bombs. White worked his way down into the bomb bay, taking with him the pins he had previously removed. To protect him if he fell, he affixed a rope to the fuselage and tied the other end around his waist. He climbed out on the relatively flimsy bomb bay doors and replaced each pin, a difficult task during flight. Accomplishing this meant that the impact of landing would not cause detonation. For this, he was recommended for the Distinguished Flying Cross by his commanding officer.

On one night mission, 36 bombers heavily loaded with bombs taxied to form a line at the beginning of the runway. In the darkness with no moon, the pilots saw only the plane in front of them. The heavy loads always made it difficult to get airborne, a constant concern. The dirt runway was lit on each side by flares. As the planes began to take off, the fourth ship in line could not get up— it crashed in a ball of fire with high flames just beyond the end of the runway. All aboard were killed even though the bombs did not explode. The 32 remaining pilots witnessed this and remained in line with engines running, waiting until the flames died down. They then proceeded to take off as planned to complete the mission.

== Ordnance ==
White's crew carried bombs on internal racks inside the plane in the bomb bay. There might be ten 250 pound bombs(110 kg) or twelve 300 pound bombs(140 kg). Additionally there were racks on the wings such that each wing could carry four bombs. The army ordnance company handled the bombs and the loading of them. Intelligence personnel would make the decision with headquarters as to what and where each mission would be. This information was passed to Ordnance personnel, who would load the bombs.

White's perch in the front bubble of the bomber featured a .50 caliber machine gun which he never needed to use probably because the bombers were protected by fighter escorts. In the invasion of Sicily, for example, the B–25s would take off from North Africa, and fly over Malta where RAF Spitfires would come up and form a box pattern above the bombers. American P–40s would fly laterally at the bomber's exact altitude.

== Invasion Sicily and Italy ==
In North Africa, German troops retreated north to Tunis, and were trapped against the Mediterranean Sea with their escape route blocked, thanks to the bombing missions that destroyed the Tunis airfield. They surrendered in large numbers. White witnessed what he estimated to be 5000 German prisoners held in a wire fenced pen. Many of these prisoners were members of elite panzer divisions and White said they were tall and physically impressive. They would be sent to prison camps the United States.

The Sicilian invasion by the Allies began in July, 1943. The importance of this campaign was that it drove enemy forces from Sicily and thereby re-opened Mediterranean sea lanes for Allied ships. Victory in Sicily would then open the door for the Allied invasion of Italy in September, 1943. White's squadron made daily bombing raids to Palermo, Sicily for about a month in the summer of 1943. At his quarters one afternoon between raids, White was surprised to look overhead to see thousands of allied aircraft of all types, including DC–3s filled with troops and towing gliders to drop over Sicily. He had been aware that the invasion was imminent, but did not know when it would actually occur. Now his team was tasked with destroying the airport in Palermo which was heavily defended by German 88-mm anti-aircraft guns coupled with powerful searchlights.

== Fifty combat missions ==
White flew 50 combat missions; 35 of them as lead bombardier. The lead bombardier is in first plane of the formation, responsible for accurately locating the target and initiating the attack. When the lead officer opens his bomb bay doors, it signals the trailing formation, which may include 25 or 30 bombers and their fighter escorts. His navigation must be accurate; changing course or circling back is not an option. Military rules state that after fifty combat missions an airman had served his time and was ready to go back to the United States (but remaining on active duty).

White returned to Nashville to reunite with his wife and family. He bought a new convertible and enjoyed a 30-day leave. He was allowed to keep the sidearm and holster he had been issued. He was then assigned to Midland Army Airfield in Texas, to teach in bombardier training school. After several months he became bored with this and applied to the Command and General Staff College in Kansas. After successful graduation he hoped to be transferred to a higher post; however, there was no post for him, and he was returned to Midland. They seemed to be caught off guard in Midland and did not have a position suitable for him. He was assigned to be "Secretary of Correspondence" for the base, responsible for every letter that came in or out of Midland Air Force Base. White said it was one of the big disappointments of his career, but he performed the job faithfully for about a year until the war was over and he could be discharged.

== Legacy ==
After military service, White returned to Nashville and earned a law degree at the Nashville School of Law. He had a long career in the real estate industry, beginning with Guaranty Mortgage Company and later forming the John W. White Company. His first wife was Rose Marie Crain. He later married Govan Davidson. After outliving both of them, he married Dudley Brown. He died at his home on July 12, 2010, at the age of 89.

As for his ship, Tuff Stuff, it remained in service for many more missions until being destroyed by fire while parked at Pompeii Airfield just south of Naples. Nearby Mount Vesuvius erupted in March, 1944, and burning ash destroyed the air base and about 88 of the B–25 bombers parked there. The ship was defended to the very end by her crew chief who swept the burning ashes from her wings as long as he could.
