= Inman Fox =

American scholar of Spanish literature (1934–2008)

Edward Inman Fox (1934–2008) was a mid-twentieth century academic from Nashville, Tennessee, who received international recognition as a scholar of modern Spanish literature. While a student at Vanderbilt University in 1951, he emerged as one of their leading tennis players. Despite the prospects of a career in the sport, Fox chose an academic career, graduating magna cum laude from Vanderbilt before earning a Ph.D. in Romance Languages at Princeton University. He later held faculty appointments at several universities and served as dean of faculty at Vassar College and president of Knox College in Illinois, where he became interested in administrative affairs. His scholarship focused on modern Spanish intellectual history, particularly the works of José Martínez Ruiz (Azorín) and Miguel de Unamuno. In 1993, his writing earned him the highest honor given by the Spanish government in the arts—the Gold Medal of Merit in the Fine Arts, by King Juan Carlos I.

== Early life ==
Born in Nashville, Tennessee, his father was Herbert F. Fox Sr.; his mother, Ladye Inman. His older brother, Herbert Fox, was a member of the Nashville Banner editorial staff; he later became a prominent society reporter in Nashville, and founded the society magazine nFocus. Inman Fox's sister was Peggy Fox Morgan. At Vanderbilt, Fox was a member of Sigma Alpha Epsilon Social Fraternity He entered the U.S. Navy as an Ensign, stationed aboard the USS Navarro out of Norfolk, Virginia.

== Tennis career ==
While in high school at Nashville's Montgomery Bell Academy, he captured local junior tennis titles in 1949 and 1950 and was captain of the tennis team. He won the Tennessee State High School Championship and the Southern Junior title in 1950. While attending Vanderbilt University from 1952–1954, Fox played No. 1 singles for the Commodores and was a tennis letterwinner. In the 1951 Nashville Municipal Tournament, he pulled off what was called “the biggest upset in local municipal history,” defeating Joe C. Davis—one of Nashville's most revered tennis figures. Fox later triumphed in the tournament, beating Steve Potts in the semifinals and John Bell Keeble in the final. For many years, Fox spent his summers working at Nashville's Belle Meade Country Club tennis facility with pro Bill Lufler of the University of Miami, coaching him. Lufler considered Fox one of the top ten collegiate players in the country. Fox said he was left-handed in everything except swinging a racquet. He played varsity basketball at MBA, leading the team in scoring his senior year. In his later career, he was assistant basketball coach at Vanderbilt and Princeton.

== Academic career ==
He received his bachelor's degree from Vanderbilt University (Phi Beta Kappa and Omicron Delta Kappa) and was named a Fulbright scholar to study at the University of Montpellier in France. He won Woodrow Wilson, Herbert Bearman Montgomery, and Owen D. Young fellowships and grants. He graduated magna cum laude, then joined the U.S. Naval Reserve and served 20 years, retiring with the rank of captain.

Fox received Vanderbilt research grants for study in Spain and later earned a Guggenheim Fellowship. He completed a Ph.D. in Romance Languages at Princeton University in 1960. While there, he developed a scholarly interest in modern Spanish intellectual history and the writers of Spain’s “Generation of ’98.” He later became an internationally recognized authority on Spanish literature and culture, particularly the works of José Martínez Ruiz (Azorín) and Miguel de Unamuno.

== Teaching ==
He began teaching at Vanderbilt in 1960, also serving as acting director of admissions. Fox's publications include 15 books and dozens of scholarly journal articles and reviews. In his teaching career, he taught at Vanderbilt, Princeton, the University of Massachusetts, Vassar and Northwestern. In 1965, he was appointed the John Guy Vassar Chair of Modern Languages at Vassar College, where he also served as Dean of Faculty and director of long-range planning.

== Management ==
In 1974, Fox was named president of Knox College in Galesburg, Illinois at a time when the institution faced serious financial difficulties. Fox became interested in the school's business management. With his efforts, the endowment of the school nearly tripled, helping restore its financial stability. The dramatic turnaround later became the subject of a case study on the role of presidential leadership by the National Center on Higher Education Management. Upon Fox's departure in 1982, alumnus trustee William Bradey wrote, “Inman Fox saved Knox College.”

From Knox College, he moved to the chairmanship of the Hispanic Studies program at Northwestern University. He later served as an academic consultant to undergraduate colleges in the U.S., South America, and the Middle East.

== Spanish literature ==
His interest in 19th- and 20th-Century Spanish literature included study of Spanish novelist and poet, Miguel de Unamuno. Fox spent many summers in Madrid, and had many friends in Spanish academic circles. In 1985, Juan Carlos, King of Spain, awarded him The cross of the Order of Queen Isabella the Catholic for his contribution to Spanish literature and culture. In 1993, King Juan Carlos awarded him the highest honor given by the Spanish government in the arts, the Medalla de Oro al Mérito en las Bellas Artes (Gold Medal of Merit in the Fine Arts), at a grand reception in the Canary Islands.

== Legacy ==
He addressed the students at his former high school in 1975 after receiving the Distinguished Alumnus Award (Montgomery Bell Academy and Wallace School). He retired and moved to Nashville in 1999, and again spoke at MBA. Dr. Fox served on the boards of the International Institute of Spain, the Association of Princeton Graduate Alumni, and the Vanderbilt Alumni Association. He chaired the Illinois Rhodes Scholarship Committee and was a consultant to the Library of Congress and the National Endowment for the Humanities. He served on the advisory boards of the Patterson School of International Diplomacy (at the University of Kentucky) and the department of Romance Languages at Princeton.

The E. Inman Fox Prize is a major academic honor awarded at Knox College to a graduating senior whose scholarly achievement and pursuit of a liberal education are considered exceptional. The prize is presented annually as part of Knox College’s academic honors and awards ceremony.
