= Research College of Nursing =

Private college in Kansas City, Missouri, US

- Type: Private
- Established: 1905
- Accreditation: HLC, CCNE
- Affiliations: Research Medical Center
- Location: Kansas City, Missouri, United States; 39.00662°N 94.55693°W
- Website: researchcollege.edu

Research College of Nursing is a private nursing college affiliated with Research Medical Center and HCA Healthcare in Kansas City, Missouri.

== History ==
Research College of Nursing was established in June 1905 as the German Hospital Training School and graduated its first class in 1909. In 1979, Research College of Nursing entered into a partnership with Rockhurst University, which facilitated collaborative educational opportunities. However, in 2018, it was announced that Research College of Nursing would regain its independence from Rockhurst University.

In January 2022, the college announced plans to suspend admissions to their Master of Science in Nursing (MSN) program starting January 15, 2022. The Research College of Nursing's Governing Board voted in August 2022 to officially end the MSN program, and the college would no longer award MSN degrees beyond December 17, 2024.

In 2023, the college and HCA Healthcare announced plans to construct a new $34.5 million, 78,000-square-foot building adjacent to Research Medical Center to increase the college's enrollment capacity.

== See also ==
- Galen College of Nursing
