= Richard M. Bracken =

American businessman

- Born: 1952 or 1953 (age 73–74)
- Education: San Diego State University; Virginia Commonwealth University
- Occupation: Businessman
- Title: Former CEO, Hospital Corporation of America
- Term: January 2009 – December 2013
- Predecessor: Jack O. Bovender Jr.
- Successor: R. Milton Johnson
- Spouse: Judith Bracken
- Children: 4

Richard M. Bracken (born 1952/53) is an American businessman. He was the chairman and chief executive officer (CEO) of the Hospital Corporation of America (NYSE: HCA), the largest for-profit healthcare provider in the world, from January 2009 to December 2013.

== Early life ==
Richard M. Bracken graduated from San Diego State University in 1974 and a Master of Health Administration from the Medical College of Virginia in 1977.

== Career ==
Bracken joined the Hospital Corporation of America in 1981. He became its president and chief operating officer in 2002. From 2009, he was chief executive officer as well as chairman, replacing Jack O. Bovender, Jr. In 2013, he earned $38.6 million for his role as CEO, the second highest paid CEO in the US, after the Oracle Corporation's Larry Ellison. He stepped down as CEO on December 31, 2013, but remains a member of the board of directors.

Bracken has been on the boards of directors of the California Hospital Association, the Federation of American Hospitals, and the United Way of Metropolitan Nashville. Additionally, he is a member of the American Society of Corporate Executives, The Business Council, the Nashville Healthcare Council, the Community Foundation of Middle Tennessee Board. He is also a Fellow in the American College of Healthcare Executives.

== Personal life ==
Bracken is married Judith, and has four children. They reside in Nashville, Tennessee.
