= Thomas F. Frist Jr. =

American billionaire businessman, wealthiest person in Tennessee

Thomas Frist
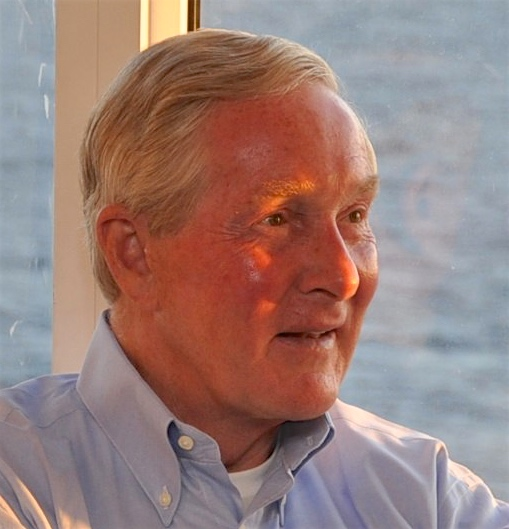
- Frist in May 2010
- Born: Thomas Fearn Frist Jr. August 12, 1938 (age 87); Nashville, Tennessee, U.S.
- Education: Vanderbilt University (BA); Washington University (MD)
- Spouse: Patricia Champion (m. 1961; died 2021)
- Children: 3, including Thomas and William
- Relatives: Thomas F. Frist Sr. (father); Bill Frist (brother); Charles A. Elcan (son-in-law)

Thomas Fearn Frist Jr. (born August 12, 1938) is an American billionaire physician and businessman. He is a co-founder of HCA Healthcare, and is the wealthiest person in Tennessee.

== Early life ==
Thomas F. Frist Jr. was born on August 12, 1938, to Thomas F. Frist Sr., a prominent internal medicine specialist in Nashville, and Dorothy Cate. Frist has four siblings: physician and former U.S. Senate Majority Leader Bill Frist; Dr. Robert A. Frist; Dorothy F. Boensch; and Mary F. Barfield.

Frist grew up in Belle Meade, a western suburb of Nashville. He attended Montgomery Bell Academy, a Nashville prep school for boys. In 1956, Frist played quarterback for MBA's state championship football team. Frist's halfback on the team was Frank Drowota, who became the chief Justice of the Tennessee Supreme Court. Frist graduated from Vanderbilt University and received an MD from Washington University School of Medicine. He was a member of the Vanderbilt chapter of Phi Delta Theta. He served as a flight surgeon in the United States Air Force.

== Business career ==
In 1968, he co-founded the Hospital Corporation of America with his father, Thomas F. Frist Sr., and Jack C. Massey.

In 1977, he became president of HCA and, in 1987, chairman, president and chief executive officer (CEO). He served as chairman in 1994, after the merger with Columbia, and after the merger with HealthTrust Inc. in April 1995, as vice chairman. He returned as chairman and CEO of the company in 1997 after the resignation of Rick Scott, who later became Governor of Florida.

He was chairman and CEO until January 2001 and chairman until January 2002. In 2006, he accepted $21 billion in private equity investments from Bain Capital, Kohlberg Kravis Roberts and Merrill Lynch and took HCA private. The deal valued HCA at $33 billion. He holds the record for the biggest leveraged buyout of all time and biggest private equity–led IPO of all time. In 2009, he stepped down from the board of directors, and his son, Billy Frist, joined the board. Frist was replaced as chairman by Jack Bovender.

From 1984 to 1995, he was on the board of directors of IBM. He was the chair of the Nashville Area Chamber of Commerce from 1999 to 2000. He is a member of The Business Council. In 2008, he co-founded the China Health Care Corporation with Charles A. Elcan. They have business interests in Cixi, China. He is president of Okeechobee Hospital Inc. and Galen Of Florida Inc.

Frist is president of Tomco II LLC, an aircraft company. In 2000, Scott Mercy, chairman and CEO of LifePoint Hospitals Inc. and chairman of America Service Group Inc., died in a crash. Similarly, in 2006, another aircraft belonging to Frist crashed.

== Philanthropy ==
He was inducted into the Healthcare Hall of Fame. He served as vice president of the Vanderbilt University board of trust from 1995 to 1997. He is a recipient of the distinguished graduates award of Vanderbilt University. He is chairman of the Frist Foundation and the Frist Center for the Visual Arts. He is a member of the Nashville Public Library Foundation.

He was a co-founder of the United Way Alexis de Tocqueville Society. He also served as chair of the board of governors for United Way of America. The Dr. Thomas F. Frist Jr. Excellence in Volunteer Leadership Award of the United Way was established in 1996. In 2012, he received the United Way Lifetime Achievement Award. In October 2020, Nashville's Belmont University announced the creation of a new medical school to be named the Thomas F. Frist Jr. College of Medicine, being established in partnership with HCA's clinical facilities branded as TriStar Health.

== Personal life ==
Frist was married to Patricia C. Frist from 1961 until her death in 2021, and he has three children. They reside in an $18-million house in Belle Meade, Tennessee. They have two sons and a daughter, who is married to investor Charles A. Elcan.

He is the wealthiest person in Tennessee and #35 on the Forbes 400, with an estimated wealth of $20 billion.

As per Forbes list of The Richest People In The World, dated 8 March 2024, Thomas F. Frist Jr. ranked #73 with a net worth of $26.2 Billion.

== Awards and honors ==
- Golden Plate Award of the American Academy of Achievement (1984)
- Vanderbilt's Distinguished Alumni Award (2002)
- Healthcare Hall of Fame (2003)
- United Way Lifetime Achievement Award (2012)
