= Thomas F. Frist III =

American businessman

- Born: c. 1968; Nashville, Tennessee
- Education: Princeton University (A.B.); Harvard Business School (M.B.A.)
- Occupations: Businessman, investor, philanthropist
- Spouse: Julie Damgard
- Children: 3
- Parent(s): Thomas F. Frist Jr. Patricia C. Frist
- Relatives: Thomas F. Frist Sr. (paternal grandfather); Bill Frist (paternal uncle); William R. Frist (brother); Charles A. Elcan (brother-in-law)

Thomas F. Frist III (born c. 1968) is an American heir, businessman, investor and philanthropist from Tennessee. He is the Founder and Managing Principal of Frist Capital, an investment firm.

== Early life ==
Thomas F. Frist III was born circa 1968 in Nashville, Tennessee. His father, Thomas F. Frist Jr., is a billionaire who served as the Chairman of HCA Healthcare. His mother, Patricia C. Frist, served as a director of SunTrust Banks from 2000 to 2010. His paternal grandfather, Thomas F. Frist Sr., was a co-founder of HCA. His paternal uncle, Bill Frist, served as a Republican Senator for Tennessee from 1995 to 2007.

He graduated with an A.B. in religion from Princeton University in 1991 after completing a 84-page long senior thesis titled "Spiritual Awakenings: The Nashville Sit - Ins, 1960." He received a master's degree in business administration from the Harvard Business School in 1997.

== Career ==
Frist was a managing partner at FS Partner, an investment firm based in New York City. He also worked for Rainwater, Inc., Richard Rainwater's investment firm, both in New York City and Fort Worth, Texas.

Frist founded Frist Capital, another investment firm, in 1998. He serves as its Managing Principal. In January 2015, the firm invested US$100 million in Bulow Clinic Partners Group, a subsidiary of Bulow Holdings, an orthotic and prosthetic firm. Meanwhile, the firm sold their investment in Tink's, a spray which attracts deer while deer hunting, to Arcus Hunting, another investment firm.

Frist served on the board of directors of Triad Hospitals. In 2009, he was appointed to the board of directors of Science Applications International Corporation (SAIC), now known as Leidos, a defense corporation. He has served on the board of directors of the Hospital Corporation of America since 2006.

== Philanthropy ==
Frist serves on the board of directors of the Frist Foundation.

== Personal life ==
In 1998, Frist married Julie Damgard, a Goldman Sachs employee and the daughter of John Michael Damgard, who served as the President of the Futures Industry Association. They have three children. They reside in Belle Meade, Tennessee, near Nashville.
