= REX American Resources =

American ethanol and natural gas company

REX American Resources Corp
- Former REX store
- Type: Public company
- Traded as: NYSE: REX; S&P 600 Component
- Industry: Basic materials
- Founded: 1980
- Headquarters: Dayton, Ohio, U.S.
- Revenue: US$695.69 million (As of 2013)
- Website: www.rexamerican.com

REX American Resources Corp. (REX; NYSE: REX) is an American producer and retailer of ethanol, distillers grains and natural gas as well as a holding company in energy entities. It was founded in 1980 and is headquartered in Dayton, Ohio. The company has the entire ownership of three affiliated corporations including Rex Radio and Television, Inc., Stereo Town, Inc. and Kelly & Cohen Appliances, Inc. As of 2012, the company has the ownership of 22 national retail stores and invested in five ethanol production entities nationwide. One of the plants the company invested in, One Earth Energy LLC, has an annual capacity of 100 million gallons of ethanol and 320,000 tons of dried distillers grains. The company exited the retail industry and transferred to energy investment in 2009 with changing the name from Rex Stores Corporation to its current name in the following year.

== Background ==
The company used to be engaged in the retail industry, but it transferred its business focus to energy in 2009 and changed its name to REX American Resources Corporation one year later. The company operates its business in two segments including Alternative Energy and Real Estate. In Alternative Energy segment, the company's properties include One Earth Energy, NuGen Energy, Patriot Renewable Fuels, Levelland Hockley County Ethanol and a portfolio group. Among the properties, only Levelland Hockley County Ethanol stopped operation now. As for Real Estate segment, the company is engaged in leasing its retail stores (281,000 square feet) to customers. As of March 2014, the company has a market capitalization of $418.23 million with an enterprise value of $412.31 million.
