= Montgomery Bell Academy =

Boys school in Nashville, Tennessee, US

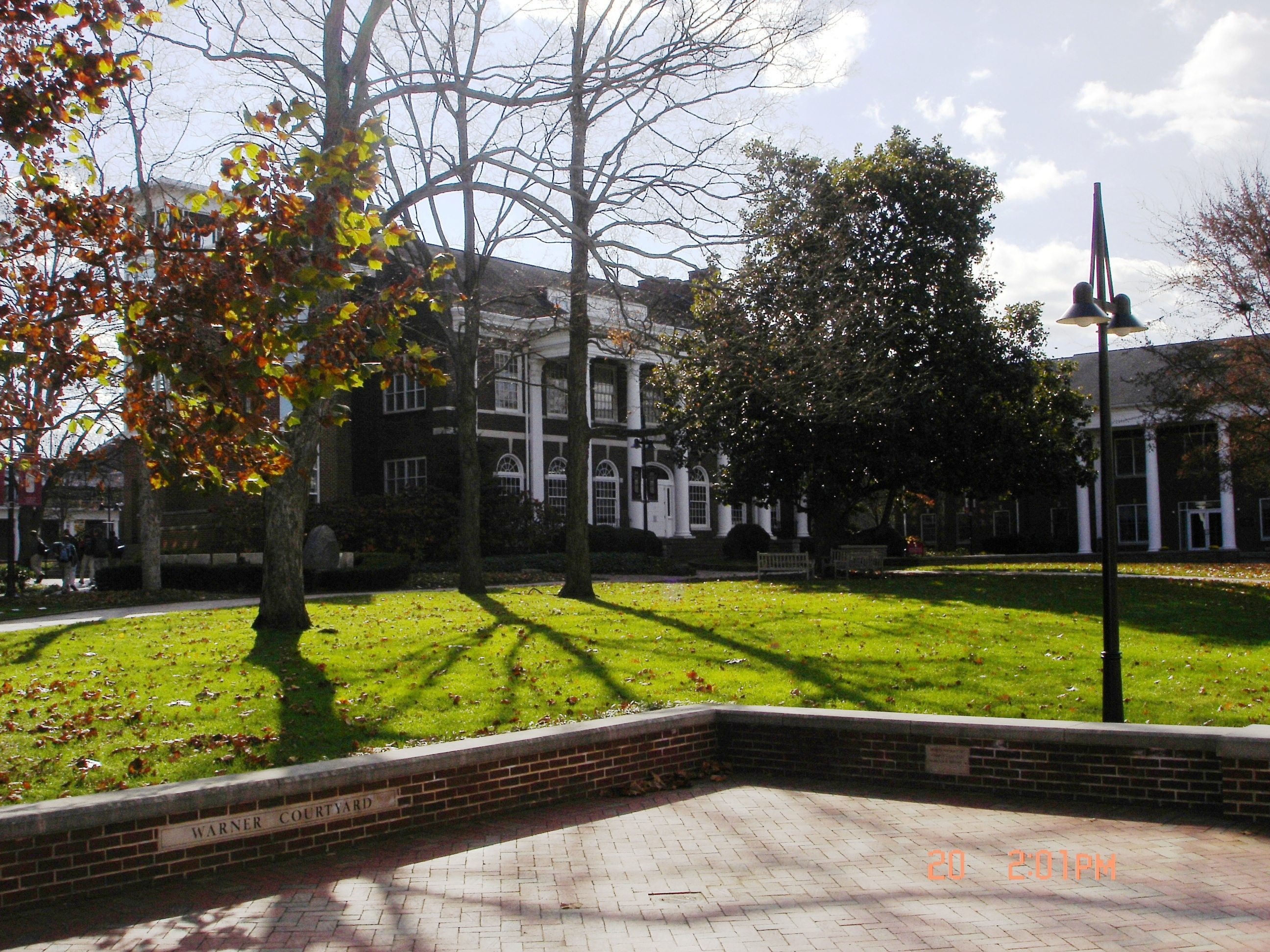

Location
- 4001 Harding Road; Nashville, Tennessee 37205; United States; 36°07′44″N 86°50′13″W

Information
- Type: Private all-male college-preparatory
- Motto: "Fortitudo Per Scientiam." ("Strength Through Knowledge")
- Founded: 1867; 159 years ago
- Sister school: Harpeth Hall School
- Headmaster: William H. Daughtrey
- Faculty: 182
- Grades: 7-12
- Gender: Male
- Enrollment: 850
- Campus: The Hill
- Colors: Cardinal and Silver
- Nickname: Big Red
- Newspaper: The Bell Ringer, Top of the Hill, The Full Monty
- Yearbook: The Bell
- Endowment: $130 million
- Website: School website

Montgomery Bell Academy (MBA) is a preparatory day school for boys in grades 7 through 12 in Nashville, Tennessee. The school is located in the Whitland Area Neighborhood.

== History ==
MBA was established in 1867 in the aftermath of the American Civil War. It is the successor to two schools: the Western Military Institute, which Sam Davis, the "Boy Hero of the Confederacy", attended, and the former University of Nashville. The school's board operates under the corporate title, "Board of Trustees of the University of Nashville", although the university was disbanded in 1909.

From 1870 to 1875, former Confederate general Edmund Kirby Smith was the chancellor of the University of Nashville, which comprised both a two-year college operating as the University of Nashville, and MBA, the preparatory high school and grammar school. In 1875, a financial crisis and a donation from the Peabody Fund caused an organizational separation of the university and the preparatory school. The university used the proceeds of the Peabody Fund and was operated under a new board of trustees under the name of Peabody Normal College, later called the George Peabody College for Teachers. The board of trustees of the University of Nashville continued to operate MBA as a preparatory school.

From about 1880 until 1915, the school operated across University Street from the campus of the former University of Nashville. In 1915, the school bought a West End Avenue estate known as Totomoi from the Tinsley family, and the campus moved soon after. The school has used the name, Totomoi, to refer to a select group of the students and faculty who best embody the ideals taught by the school.

The military nature of one of the predecessors notwithstanding, under its current name it has always operated as a civilian institution, and as a day school rather than a boarding school. The school is named in honor of Montgomery Bell, a Pennsylvania native who made his fortune as the early 19th century "ironmaster" of Middle Tennessee and whose will endowed it, with the stipulation that it forever be an all-male institution.

In the 1970s, the school's enrollment surged as white parents withdrew their children from racially integrated public schools. In 1980, the headmaster Michael Drake told a newspaper "Every time the court rules in the Metro desegregation case, our enrollment goes way up."

== Campus and resources ==
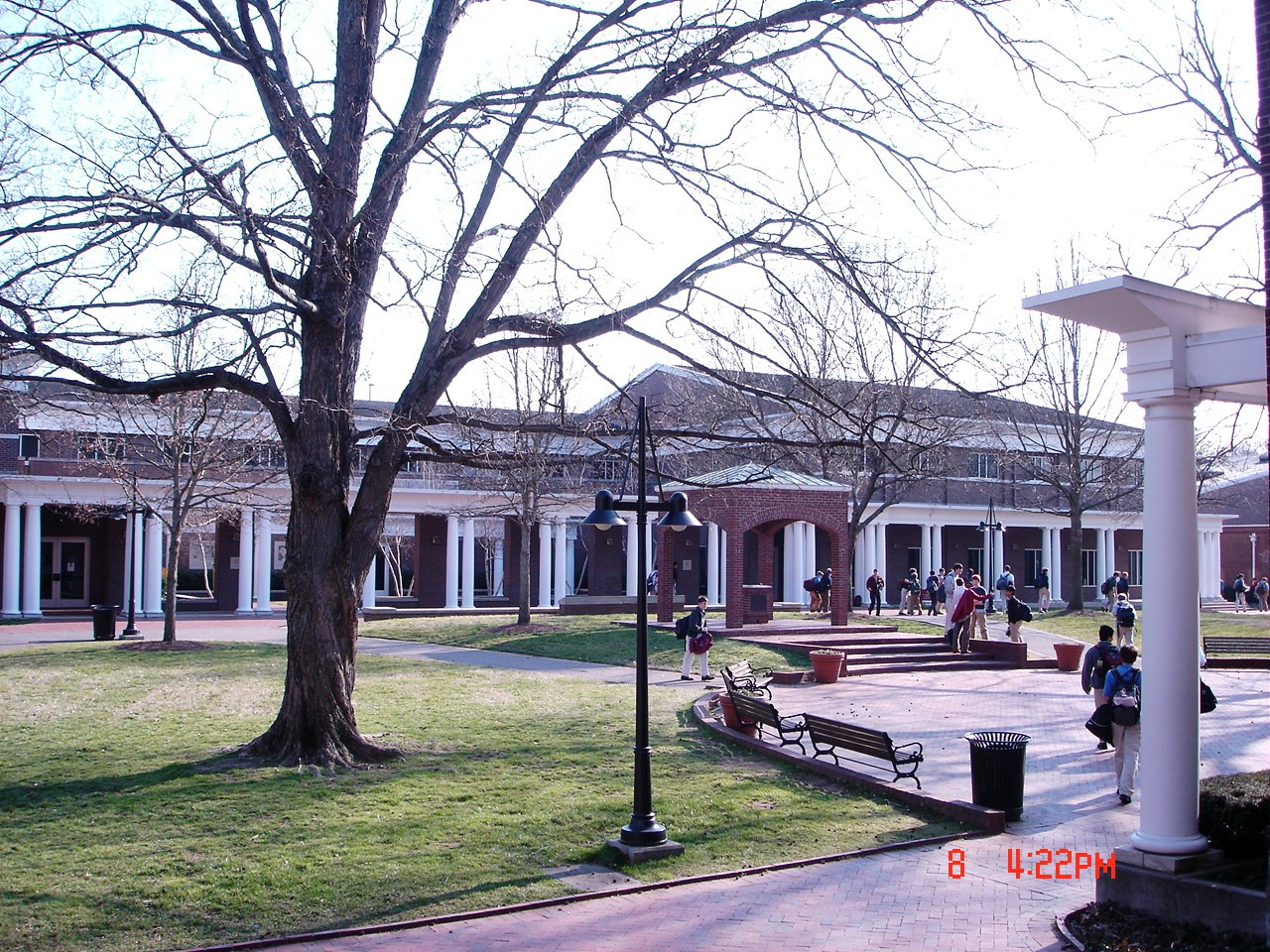
The front of the Davis Building during school dismissal.

Montgomery Bell Academy's campus consists of eight academic and administrative buildings, a wellness center, and numerous on-campus athletic facilities.

Montgomery Bell Academy also owns and operates a 150 acre piece of land, including a 24" telescope in McMinnville, Tennessee at Long Mountain. This site is noted for having the least ambient light in the Southeastern United States, making conditions favorable for astrophotography. Annually, the Montgomery Bell Academy faculty and student body journey to the facility to hold the school's annual Leadership Retreat. On the facility grounds, there are two football fields, a lake, a high ropes course, and a low ropes course. The main feature of the campus (besides the observatory) is the large cliff to the west of the building. Students are challenged each year to rappel down the cliff and climb up the cliff as well. On occasion, the school's climbing club comes to the facility to practice all-natural rock climbing.

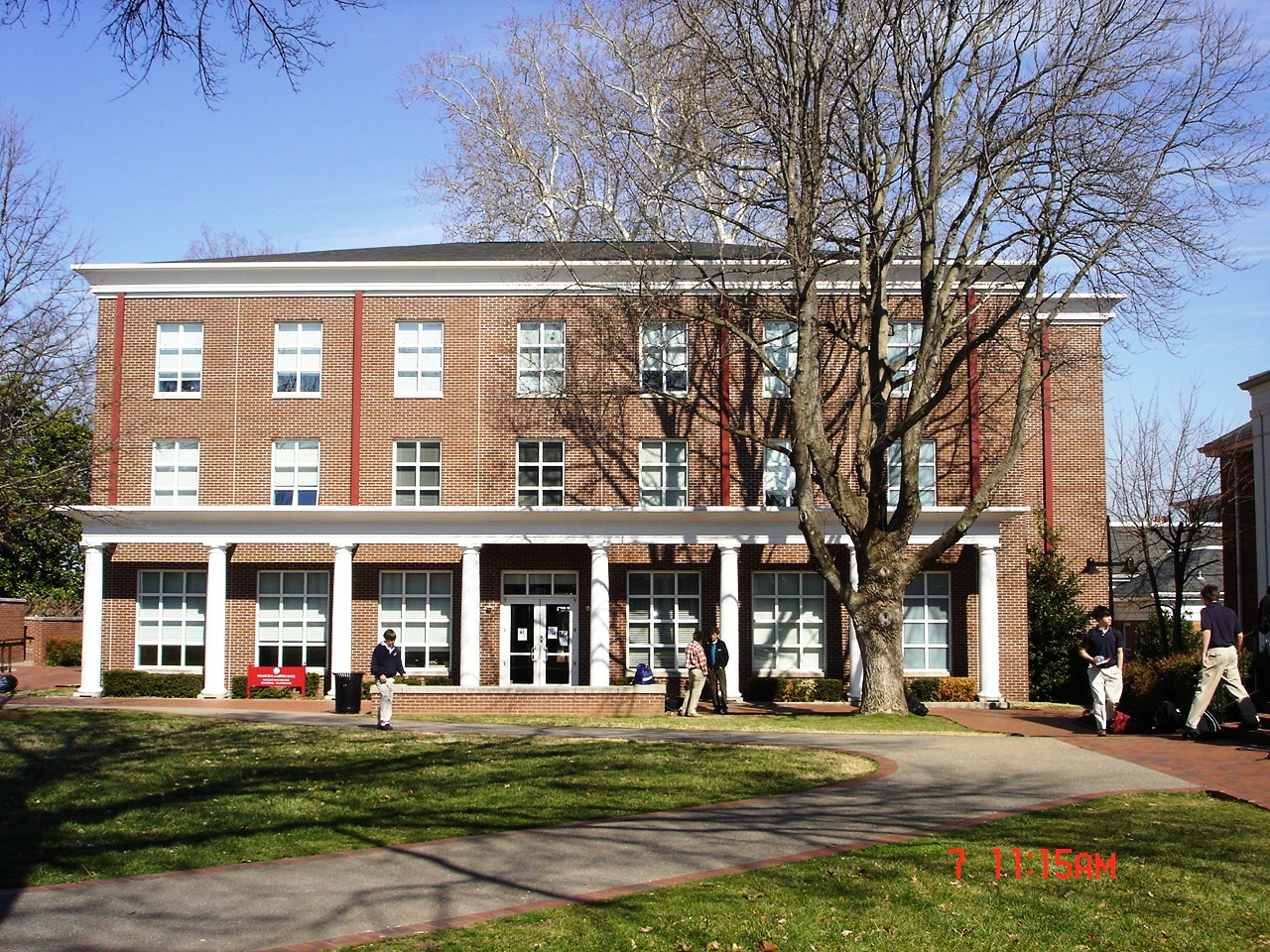
The rear view of the Carter Building.

In 2011, Montgomery Bell Academy added the new Lowry Building in late December. In 2012, the school's new building, the Wallace Building, was completed. In addition to these new structures, a geothermal heating and cooling system was added. The school has also constructed new, porous parking lots to facilitate the new irrigation system.

Montgomery Bell Academy also has exchange links with other boys' schools throughout the English-speaking world; these include Eton College and Winchester College in England, Kearsney College and Michaelhouse in South Africa, and The Southport School, The King's School, Parramatta and, most recently, Melbourne Grammar School in Australia, Christ's College, Christchurch in New Zealand and The Raffles Institution in Singapore. Winchester College and Eton College are similar to MBA through discipline, dress code, and having an all-male student body.

Notable individuals who have spoken to the student body include Michael Crichton, Ted Turner, Peyton Manning, Charles Townes, and Robert Orr, Jr.

A statue of Sam Davis was installed on the school grounds, until 2020.

In 2021, MBA completed construction of a new 200,000-square-foot athletic and wellness center, the Burkholder Wellness Center. The project also included a new football stadium and lacrosse field.

== Athletics ==
Montgomery Bell Academy's sports offerings include football, basketball, baseball, soccer, lacrosse, ice hockey, rowing, swim and dive, and more.

The school has won the Tennessee Secondary School Athletic Association's football championship fourteen times, from 1915 to 2014.

The school has also gained recognition for its Cross Country team. Since its inception in 1995, the team has claimed a total of thirteen state championships. Most notably, the team claimed a perfect sweep in the state championship of 2010, in which all top five places were claimed by the school's runners.

The school's tennis team was able to claim the state title of 2013 over the Gulliver Preparatory School by a margin of 5-to-4. The team also hosts a spring tennis tournament, entitled the Francis Carter Invitational.

The MBA Soccer Program is led by the former Coach of Waterford United (Irish Premier League), Giles Cheevers. MBA Soccer captured the 2015 TSSAA Tennessee State Soccer Championship (DII-AA) with a 3-0 win over Christian Brothers High School (CBHS).

The MBA Swim and Dive program is led by head coach Pat Killian, who graduated as the valedictorian of MBA, and went on to swim at Yale. He has been recognized as one of the best swim coaches in the state of Tennessee.

MBA Athletics sends many students per year to continue their athletics in college — a much higher percentage than the national average.

MBA has a Hacky Sack program (est. 2026) that ranks #2 in the nation and #1 in Tennessee.

== Debate and forensics ==
In addition to its academics programs, Montgomery Bell Academy has a separate debate and forensics program. The school offers Policy Debate to its students.

Annually, Montgomery Bell Academy hosts its speech and debate tournament, the Southern Bell Forum. The tournament has a unique ranking system, where speaker points are accounted for in the final ranking system.

In 2025, Montgomery Bell Academy won the National High School Mock Trial competition in Phoenix, Arizona, bringing the state its fourth National Championship victory.

Both the MBA debate team and the MBA mock trial team are consistently at the top of the national debate and mock trial rankings, respectively.

== Visual and performing arts ==
The Montgomery Bell Academy theater program has won awards at the Tennessee Theater Association. The school also performs its annual student-directed one-acts in April and May, where it invites the students to write and direct their original scripts. MBA also performs its annual musical with students from the Harpeth Hall School. There are two high school orchestras. The most advanced is Chamber, which students have to receive through approval from the director, while the other, non-recommendation orchestra is known as Sinfonia.

== In popular culture ==
Montgomery Bell Academy graduate Thomas Schulman, class of 1968, wrote the screenplay for the 1989 motion picture Dead Poets Society, which depicts a fictional school patterned after Montgomery Bell Academy. Robin Williams portrayed a character based on Sam Pickering, one of Schulman's teachers during his years at Montgomery Bell Academy.

== Notable alumni ==
- Lt. Gen. Frank Maxwell Andrews, aviation pioneer, World War II European commander, Andrews Air Force Base namesake
- Will Bartholomew, NFL fullback
- Ridley Wills II, author, historian
- Jere Baxter, railroad entrepreneur
- Robin Beard, former member of U.S. House of Representatives
- David Briley, Eighth mayor of Metropolitan Nashville
- Madison Smartt Bell, novelist
- Ty Chandler, Running back for the Minnesota Vikings
- R. A. Dickey, professional baseball pitcher and 2012 Cy Young Award winner
- Jacob M. Dickinson, U.S. Secretary of War
- Frank Drowota, former Chief Justice, Tennessee Supreme Court
- Morgan Entrekin, Grove/Atlantic, Inc. president
- J. Frederick Essary (1881-1942), journalist
- Jesse Hill Ford, novelist
- Inman Fox, prominent scholar of modern Spanish literature
- Bill Frist, former U.S. Senate Majority Leader
- Thomas Frist, founder of Hospital Corporation of America
- Brendan Kyle Hatcher, U.S. Diplomat
- Hunter Hillenmeyer, Chicago Bears linebacker
- John Jay Hooker, attorney, entrepreneur, politician
- E. Bronson Ingram II, American businessman and billionaire
- Madison Jones, novelist
- Kevin M. Kruse, historian
- Oliver Kuhn, athlete
- Alan LeQuire, sculptor
- Ingle Martin, Football player (NFL Quarterback)
- Penn Murfee, professional baseball pitcher for the Seattle Mariners
- Tom Neff, CEO and founder of The Documentary Channel
- Samuel Pickering, essayist
- Admiral Joseph W. Prueher, a former Commander-in-Chief of the U.S. Pacific Command and Ambassador to China.
- Marcel Reed, college football quarterback
- Grantland Rice, early 20th-century American sportswriter
- Tom Santi, NFL tight end
- Charles Sawyers, physician-scientist
- Brandt Snedeker, PGA Tour Golfer
- Thomas Schulman, screenwriter of Dead Poets Society
- Richard Speight, Jr., actor
- Bill Wade, NFL quarterback
- John Warner White, WWII Bombardier, memoirist, author
- Freddie O'Connell, 10th Mayor of Metropolitan Nashville
