= Jack O. Bovender Jr. =

American health care chief executive

- Born: August 16, 1945 (age 81); Winston-Salem, North Carolina, U.S.
- Education: Duke University (BA, MHA)
- Occupations: Former Chairman & CEO, Hospital Corporation of America
- Term: 2002–2009
- Successor: Richard M. Bracken
- Spouse: Barbra
- Children: 1

Jack O. Bovender Jr. is the former chairman and CEO of Hospital Corporation of America from 2002 to 2009.

== Early life and career ==
Bovender was born on August 16, 1945 in Winston-Salem, North Carolina. He attended high school in King, North Carolina. He began his career in hospital administration as a U.S. Navy lieutenant stationed at the Naval Medical Center Portsmouth. He continued to work in the health care industry until his retirement in 2009 from Hospital Corporation of America.

Bovender is the retired chairman and CEO of Nashville-based Hospital Corporation of America. HCA owns and operates approximately 160 hospitals and 100 surgery centers in the United States and England. He became president and CEO in 1992, and was chairman and CEO from 2002 to 2009. Additionally, he is a founding member of the Nashville Health Care Council and is on the boards of several human service and arts organizations.

Bovender graduated from Duke University in 1967, with a B.A. in psychology and in 1969 with a Master of Health Administration. Bovender has been on the Fuqua School of Business Board of Visitors for several years. He is a former member of Duke Divinity School's board of visitors and former chairman of the Duke University Divinity School's capital campaign committee. He has also been on the executive committee of the Duke Annual Fund. He is a member of the university's board of trustees, vice chair of the board, chair of the audit committee, vice chair of the business and finance committee, and a member of the executive committee.

He was named by Institutional Investor magazine as "Best CEO in America" for healthcare facilities in 2003, 2004 and 2005.

== Philanthropy ==
Bovender and his wife donated $25 million to Duke in 2011.

== Personal life ==
Bovender is married to Barbara, and has one son, Richard.
