= Thomas F. Frist Sr. =

American businessman and physician (1910–1998)

Thomas F. Frist
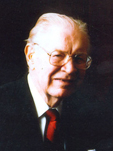
- Born: Thomas Fearn Frist; December 15, 1910; Meridian, Mississippi, U.S.
- Died: January 4, 1998 (aged 87); Nashville, Tennessee, U.S.
- Education: University of Mississippi; Vanderbilt University
- Occupations: Physician; businessman
- Spouse: Dorothy Cate
- Children: 5, including Bill and Thomas Jr.
- Relatives: Thomas F. Frist, III (grandson)

Thomas Fearn Frist (December 15, 1910 – January 4, 1998) was an American physician and businessman who co-founded the Hospital Corporation of America.

== Early life ==
Thomas Fearn Frist Sr. was born on December 15, 1910, in Meridian, Mississippi, the son of Jennie (Jones) Frist and Jacob C. Frist.

Frist was two years old when his father, railroad stationmaster Jacob Chester Frist, was critically injured pushing an elderly woman and her grandson out of the way of an oncoming train, which then struck him. He later died from his injuries, and was awarded the Andrew Carnegie "Hero Award" and the Medal of Honor for Lifesaving on Railroads for his actions.

Frist received his undergraduate education from the University of Mississippi in 1931 and his medical degree from Vanderbilt University in 1933.

Frist always found innovative ways to make money. To pay for his college tuition at University of Mississippi, he published a football calendar and sold space on it to local stores and other advertisers. He also came up with an idea to provide "play by play" reports to the Ole Miss students who could not travel to the away football games. Using Western Union, Frist had the details of the game transmitted to him at school, where he charged fans a dollar to sit in the gymnasium and listen to his account of the game, announced through a megaphone.

Frist's mother had supported the family by running a boarding house after her husband's death. Later, he followed in her footsteps, running a boarding house for medical students to pay his way through medical school. Frist called it "Pauper's Paradise."

Frist had hoped to become a surgeon, and went to Iowa City for a rotating internship at the various University of Iowa hospitals. However, near the end of his first year of residency, he suffered a collapsed lung which was diagnosed as tuberculosis. He had to drop out of the program, on doctor's orders, for about six months, and ultimately was not able to raise the funds to continue his training. He then returned to Nashville and opened a private practice as a general medical doctor. Frist later took courses from Boston heart specialist Dr. Paul Dudley White, and became the doctor to see in Nashville when patients had heart ailments.

Dr. Frist served as a Major in the U.S. Army Medical Corps during World War II and became chief of medical services for a 1,000-bed hospital.

== Career ==
Frist began his career in Nashville as an internist doing physical exams for insurance companies, then later became a cardiologist. He regularly provided house calls to his patients, and practiced in the region for 50 years, attending to seven Tennessee governors. As one of the few practicing cardiologists in the state (it was then a new field), he engaged in some of the earliest forms of telemedicine to help treat patients in neighboring rural towns at all hours of the day and night. When the electrocardiograph (EKG) proved reliable, he became the first doctor in Nashville to have the new machine, outside of the teaching hospital at Vanderbilt.

In 1968, with his son, Dr. Thomas F. Frist Jr., and Jack C. Massey, who helped Harland Sanders create the Kentucky Fried Chicken chain, he co-founded Hospital Corporation of America (HCA), the largest private operator of health care facilities in the world, taking the company public in 1969. Frist Sr. had started Park View Hospital in Nashville in 1961 after being frustrated by the overcrowding and lower quality care he saw in the non-for-profit hospitals, bringing together a group of 20 medical providers and four businessman to invest in the private hospital and nursing home. Park View became the first HCA hospital in 1968. And HCA later became the first on the New York Stock Exchange to reach $1 billion in revenue in its first decade as a public company. Frist Sr. served as chief medical officer and chairman of the board of governors from the company's creation. He is widely regarded as "the father of the modern for-profit hospital system" in the U.S.

Former Tennessee Governor Winfield Dunn said of Frist: ''He was a man of such character and ability that he would have been a healer even if he had never gone to medical school. He was truly devoted to other people.” Frist would frequently enter his hospitals through the kitchen or boiler room, shaking the hand of each employee, learning their names and about their families. He kept photos of each hospital's head cook, head nurse, boiler room worker, administrator and their families on the wall in his office.

Seeing a growing need in Nashville for housing and living support for aging community members, Dr. Frist helped found the Park Manor senior living community. Park Manor began as a joint project between the Presbyterian Church and the Tennessee Council on Aging, on which Frist served. He along with Hugh Knox, a moderator of the Presbytery of Middle Tennessee, and Dr. Thomas Barr, a former pastor of the Trinity Presbyterian Church, worked together to get the project approved and built, which opened its doors to community members in July 1962, and is still in operation today. Prior to founding Park Manor, Frist participated in the Federal-State Conference on Aging in Washington, DC in June 1956, where more than 250 State and Federal officials met to study the field of aging and work towards practical programs.

In 1978, Frist and Massey went on to found the assisted living and retirement company, the American Retirement Corporation (NYSE:ACR), which offered marketing, management, and development assistance, and direct management of retirement community properties, with customers nationwide. It merged in 1992 with the National Retirement Corporation, and in 2006 it was acquired by Brookdale Senior Living for $1.2 billion.

Frist also founded Cumberland Heights with Robert Crichton Sr., after Robert contacted him in 1965 about starting an addiction recovery center in Tennessee. At the time, there were very few options in the southeast for treatment, and substance abuse was seen as a moral failing rather than as a disease. Dr. Frist agreed there was a clear need, and he helped lead a fundraising drive to establish the center. By year's end, more than $284,000 had been raised, and in 1966 Cumberland Heights opened its doors as the first recovery center of its kind in the region. More than half a century later, Cumberland Heights continues to operate as a successful, outcome-oriented non-profit organization committed to helping individuals struggling with substance abuse.

== Personal life ==
He was married to Dorothy Cate. Tommy and Dorothy used a positive reinforcement method of parenting with their three sons and two daughters: Thomas F. Frist Jr. (physician, businessman, and philanthropist); Robert A. Frist (physician); Bill Frist (physician and U.S. Senator); Dorothy F. Boensch; and Mary F. Barfield.

In a letter addressed "For my family and future generations with great love," dated his 87th birthday, Frist writes, "I believe there is a God and in Jesus Christ. The only prayer I ever pray is thanking God for all the blessing I have . . . God in his wisdom, knows what you need." Frist grew up in the Presbyterian Church in Meridian, Mississippi, where he claims to have never missed a Sunday from age three to eighteen.

== Death ==
Dr. Thomas F. Frist Sr. died in Nashville on January 4, 1998 and is interred at Mount Olivet Cemetery.
