= Fern Creek =

Fern Creek may refer to several places:

- Fern Creek, Louisville, a neighborhood of Louisville, Kentucky
- Fern Creek, a California stream that flows from the Sierra Crest to Mono Lake
- Fern Creek (Alberta), a stream in Canada
