= Hiller Spires =

American educator, author, and academic

Hiller Ann Spires
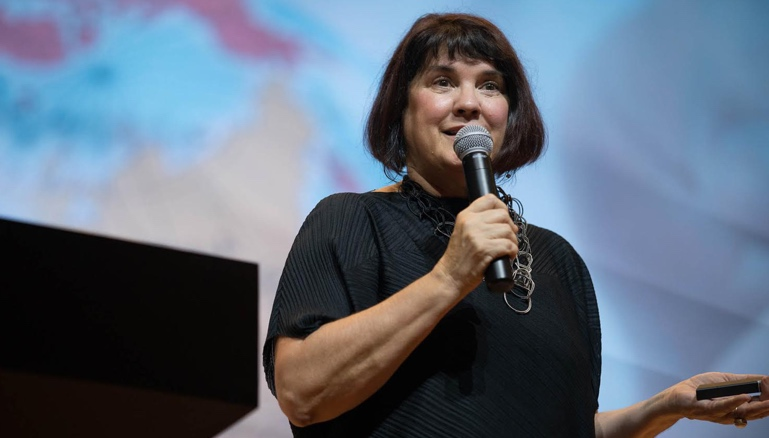
- Occupations: Teacher, author, and academic
- Known for: Founding Director of Friday Institute for Educational Innovation and of Margiesbooks

Academic background
- Education: BS in education MA in English education PhD in literacy Education
- Alma mater: Tennessee Temple University; University of South Carolina
- Thesis: An investigation of the effects of metacognitive adjunct questions on reading comprehension (1986)

Hiller Ann Spires is an American teacher, author, and academic. She is an executive director and Professor Emerita at North Carolina State University and Co-Creator of Suzhou North America High School in Suzhou, China, where she serves as Honorary Principal.

Spires' research has focused on the integration of research-based practices for digital and disciplinary literacies, and project-based inquiry for diverse learners. She has published over 200 refereed articles, chapters, and papers. She served as the Guest Editor for the international special issue of the journal Media and Communication by Cogitatio Press on the topic of critical perspectives on digital literacies in 2019. Additionally, she founded Margie's Books, which provides children and young adult books for under-resourced educational communities.

== Early life and education ==
In 1975, Spires graduated from Hartsville Senior High School. She became a college student at Tennessee Temple University, where she earned a BS in Education with a focus on English and Speech in 1979. After teaching English, Speech, and Drama at a high school in Chattanooga, TN, for two years, she pursued further education at the University of South Carolina. In 1982, she completed her master's degree in English Education, and received her PhD in Literacy Education in 1986.

== Academic career ==
Spires began her academic career at the University of South Carolina, serving as both the assistant director and then the Director of the Academic Skills Program, while completing her PhD studies. She joined the faculty in the College of Education at North Carolina State University in 1987 as an assistant professor of literacy and was promoted to Professor in 2000. As of June 1, 2022, she retired from NC State University and has been serving as Professor Emerita since then.

Spires was the Founding Director of the Friday Institute for Educational Innovation from 2002 to 2006 and served in its creation and initial operations. Starting in November 2019, she began her second term as the executive director of the Friday Institute and also took on the role of Associate Dean for the College of Education.

Spires initiated the Exploring Next-Generation Education Series involving local and national leaders to share their insights on equity and the changing landscape of education. She also led the NC Literacy and Equity Summit in 2022 which brought together educators virtually to address the question: "How do we transform our shared aspiration—that all NC students read on grade level—into action?" The Summit was followed up with a policy brief that highlighted teachers' voices titled "Meeting the Moment: Strategic Recommendations for Literacy and Equity'. The Friday Institute served over 80,000 educators and all 115 public school districts across North Carolina through online professional learning since 2020.

Spires established Project-Based Inquiry (PBI) Global, a learning cycle based on inquiry-to-action principles that addressed the UN Sustainable Development Goals, involving teachers and students from the United States, Belize, Kenya, and China. She also held the role of Founding Director for the Friday Institute's New Literacies Collaborative and led the development of the New Literacies and Global Learning (NLGL) master's degree program, which encompassed the K-12 Literacy Cohort.

Spires has conducted extensive research, teaching, and collaboration with teachers in China for which she received NC State's Jackson A. Rigney International Service Award in 2011. In 2013, she assisted in designing and creating Suzhou North America High School.

== Bibliography ==
=== Selected books ===
- Digital transformation and innovation in Chinese education (2018) ISBN 978-1522529248
- Read, write, inquire: Disciplinary literacy in grades 6–12 with Shea N. Kerkhoff, Casey Medlock Paul (2020) ISBN 978-0807763339
- Critical perspectives on global literacies: Research and practice with Shea N. Kerkhoff (2023) ISBN 978-1032335483
