= Tennessee Temple University =

Private university in Chattanooga, Tennessee, US

- Motto: Training to Transform
- Type: Private university
- Established: 1946 – 2015 (merged with Piedmont International University)
- Students: 468 university and 88 seminary students
- Location: Chattanooga, Tennessee, United States; 35.0330°N 85.2777°W
- Campus: Highland Park
- Nickname: Crusaders
- Website: www.tntemple.edu

Tennessee Temple University was a private Christian university in Chattanooga, Tennessee, United States. Temple Baptist Seminary was the university's graduate school of Christian theology, also operating in Chattanooga. The university merged with Piedmont International University in 2015.

== History ==
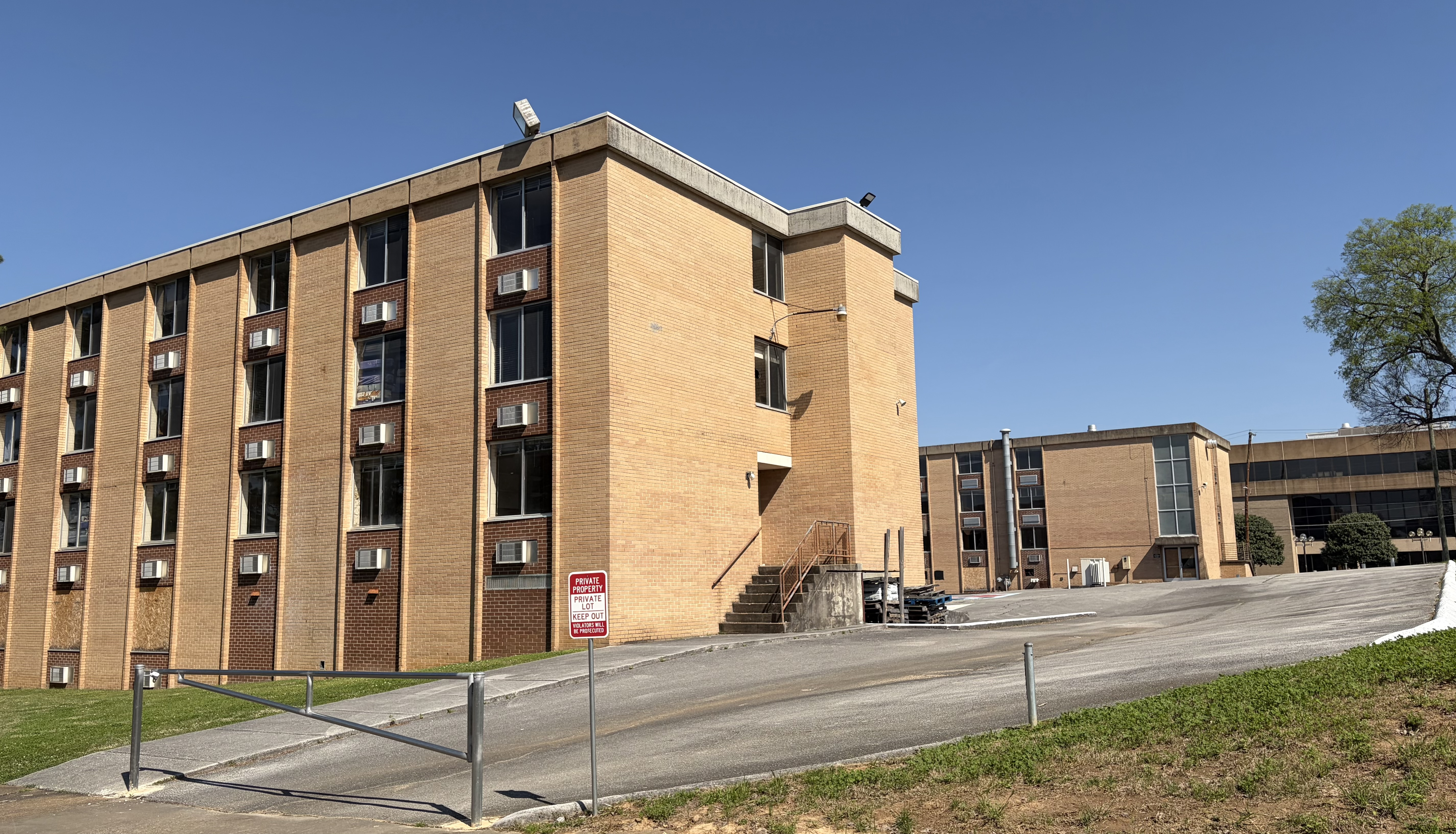
Former TTU campus buildings

Tennessee Temple was founded in 1946 under the leadership and vision of Lee Roberson. As the pastor of a prominent Southern Baptist church, Highland Park Baptist Church in Chattanooga, Roberson saw a need to train people for ministry through higher education. Believing that God was leading him to act upon this need, he began an evening Bible institute which would eventually blossom into a Bible college and a liberal arts college. Later, a seminary would be added. Under Roberson's leadership from 1946 to 1983, the university was "at the center of the Independent Baptist movement."

The close relationship that the school maintained with Highland Park Baptist Church, one of the early megachurches of the modern era, created many ministry training opportunities for the students of Tennessee Temple. This model would be the inspiration for the Rev. Jerry Falwell to begin what would become Liberty University. Tennessee Temple's peak enrollment was more than 4,000 students in the early 1980s, but enrollment had dropped by 3,000 by 1991.

As of September 2013, there were "just over" 400 students enrolled. In September 2013, university leaders reported that the institution was considering a campus relocation, from Highland Park to a larger site on Woodland Park Baptist Church property located on Standifer Gap Road. In February 2014, the university announced that it would sell most of its Highland Park campus buildings to Redemption to the Nations, the parent organization of Redemption Point Church, and move to a new site by June 2015.

In March 2015, it was announced that, as of April 30, 2015, Tennessee Temple University would dissolve and merge with Piedmont International University, a private Christian college in Winston-Salem, North Carolina.

=== Presidents ===
Presidents of the university included:

- Lee Roberson, 1946-1974
- J.R. Faulkner, 1974-1985
- J. Don Jennings, 1985-1990
- Leldon W. “Buddy” Nichols, 1991-1993
- Roger H. Stiles, 1993-2002
- David E. Bouler, 2002-2005
- J. Daniel Lovett, 2005-2011
- Steven F. Echols, 2011-2015

== Athletics ==
The Tennessee Temple athletic teams were called the Crusaders. The university was a member of the National Christian College Athletic Association (NCCAA), primarily competing as an independent in the Mid-East Region of the Division I level until the end of the 2014–15 academic year. The Crusaders were also a member of the National Association of Intercollegiate Athletics (NAIA) from 2006–07 to 2007–08, as well as a member of the United States Collegiate Athletic Association (USCAA) from 2013–14 to 2014–15 (when the school closed).

Tennessee Temple competed in 11 intercollegiate varsity sports: Men's sports include baseball, basketball, cross country, soccer and track & field; while women's sports include basketball, cross country, soccer, softball (fast-pitch), track & field and volleyball. Club sports included cheerleading and wrestling.

== Notable alumni, students, and faculty ==
- Kay Arthur, co-founder of Precept Ministries International, 1965
- Dan Jenkins, former member of the Florida Senate
- Dan Lothian, former White House Correspondent for CNN, 1987
- Kevin Malone, former general manager of the Los Angeles Dodgers, coach
- Hiller Spires, executive director and Professor Emerita at North Carolina State University and Co-Creator of Suzhou North America High School in Suzhou
- Dallas Willard, former professor of philosophy at the University of Southern California and noted Christian author, 1956
