= Lee Roberson =

American evangelist (1909–2007)

- Born: Lavern Edward Roberson; November 24, 1909
- Died: April 29, 2007 (aged 97); Chattanooga, Tennessee, US
- Occupations: Pastor, evangelist
- Spouse: Caroline Allen (m. 1937; died 2005)
- Children: 4
- Religion: Christianity
- Church: Southern Baptist, Independent Baptist
- Congregations served: Highland Park Baptist Church (1942-1983)

Lavern "Lee" Edward Roberson (November 24, 1909 – April 29, 2007) was an American pastor and evangelist. He was the founder of Tennessee Temple University and Temple Baptist Seminary in Chattanooga, Tennessee, and Camp Joy, in Harrison, Tennessee.

== Early life ==
Roberson was born in a two-room log cabin and spent his first two years on a farm near English, Indiana, a small town in the southern part of the state. Originally named Lavern Edward, he was known throughout his life as "Lee." In 1911, his parents, Charles E. and Dora (Sego) Roberson, took him to a farm near Louisville, Kentucky, where his father farmed, worked on streetcars, and built homes to make a living. In 1923, at the age of fourteen, he was led to the Lord by his Sunday School teacher, Mrs. Daisy Hawes, and joined the Cedar Creek Baptist Church near Louisville.

== Education ==
After spending two years at the Louisville Male High School, where he received a diploma in public accounting when he was fourteen years old, Roberson then attended the Fern Creek High School, where he played football and graduated after four years.

Roberson entered Old Bethel College in Russellville, Kentucky, in 1926, and completed one year there. There he worked at various jobs from washing dishes to scrubbing floors to pay his way. From Old Bethel College, he went to the University of Louisville to complete his college work with a major in history. He also continued his education at the Southern Baptist Theological Seminary in Louisville, where he studied under Dr. A.T. Robertson. At the age of nineteen, he was called by a church in Jeffersontown, Kentucky, but he did not accept.

In his early years, Roberson was well known as a singer. Having studied at the Cincinnati Conservatory of Music and with the well-known teacher, John Samples, of Chicago, his services as a vocalist were in great demand. He served as a soloist on the staff of radio station WHAS of Louisville and WSM in Nashville, Tennessee. Roberson was offered a contract by Gaetano Salvatore de Luca at the Nashville Conservatory of Music. After a discussion with de Luca, Roberson decided to give up musical performance, and declined on the grounds that such a music career was not in accordance with his divine calling to the ministry.

== Ministry ==
The first church that Roberson served as pastor was in Germantown, Tennessee, while he was in college. In 1932, he was called to be pastor of the Temple Baptist Church in Greenbrier, Tennessee. It was there that he began emphasizing the Second Coming of Christ. After three years with the Greenbrier church, Roberson entered full-time evangelistic work in 1935.

Roberson served as evangelist of the Birmingham Baptist Association. Within two years he had conducted some fifty revivals in the Birmingham area. On the first Sunday in November 1937, Lee Roberson became pastor of the First Baptist Church in Fairfield, Alabama. In 1939, he was asked to be the state evangelist for Alabama, but he declined.

After five years with the Fairfield church, Roberson was called by the Highland Park Baptist Church in Chattanooga in November 1942. Four years later, Roberson founded Tennessee Temple University and Zion College. Two years later in 1948, a theological seminary, Southeastern Baptist Seminary (renamed Temple Baptist Seminary in 1954) was added. His ministry would continue to branch out to radio via WDYN, a citywide bus ministry, and the founding of Camp Joy. At one point in the 1980s, Highland Park Baptist Church boasted 57,000 members, making it one of the largest churches in the United States.

Roberson preached his last service as pastor of Highland Park Baptist Church on April 27, 1983, but continued preaching across the nation and publishing many books until his death.

== Family ==
In Birmingham, Roberson met Caroline Allen; they married on October 9, 1937. They had four children: LeeAnne (b. May 2, 1941; d. June 15, 2008), Joy Caroline (b. June 6, 1946; d. August 10, 1946), John, and June. Joy's premature death as an infant led to the establishment of Camp Joy.

== Death ==
Roberson died on April 29, 2007, two years after his wife's death.

== Books ==
- Diamonds in the Rough—Sword of the Lord Pub (ISBN 0-87398-179-0)
- Disturbing Questions...Solid Answers—Sword of the Lord Pub (ISBN 0-87398-161-8)
- Double-Breasted—Sword of the Lord Pub (ISBN 0-87398-160-X)
- Gold Mine, The—Sword of the Lord Pub (ISBN 0-87398-339-4)
- Preaching to America—Sword of the Lord Pub (ISBN 0-87398-667-9)
- Ten Thousand Tears—Sword of the Lord Pub (ISBN 0-87398-837-X)
- The Faith that Moves Mountains—Sword of the Lord Pub (ISBN 0-87398-276-2)
- The Man In Cell No. 1—Sword of the Lord Pub (ISBN 0-87398-567-2)
- Touching Heaven—Sword of the Lord Pub (ISBN 0-87398-848-5)
- Coming to Chattanooga Soon—Sword of the Lord Pub (ISBN 0-87398-129-4)
- Big 90, The—Sword of the Lord Pub (ISBN 0-87398-087-5)

== Bibliography ==
- Reese, Edward. The Life and Ministry of Lee Roberson. Glenwood, Ill: Fundamental Publishers, 1975.
- Terry, Lindsay. A Daring Faith in a Hazardous World: Build a Courageous Lifestyle with Lee Roberson. Greenville, SC: Ambassador Emerald International, 2006.
- Wigton, James H. Lee Roberson -- Always About His Father's Business. Xulon Press, 2010. (ISBN 1609579887)
