= Fern Creek High School =

Coordinates: 38°9′20.90″N 85°35′32.39″W

Location
- 9115 Fern Creek Road; Louisville, Kentucky 40291; United States

Information
- Type: Public high school
- Established: 1923
- School district: Jefferson County Public Schools
- Principal: Rebecca Nicholas
- Staff: 105.80 (FTE)
- Grades: 9-12
- Enrollment: 1,588 (2023–2024)
- Student to teacher ratio: 15.01
- Campus: Suburban
- Colors: Orange and black
- Mascot: Tiger
- Website: School site

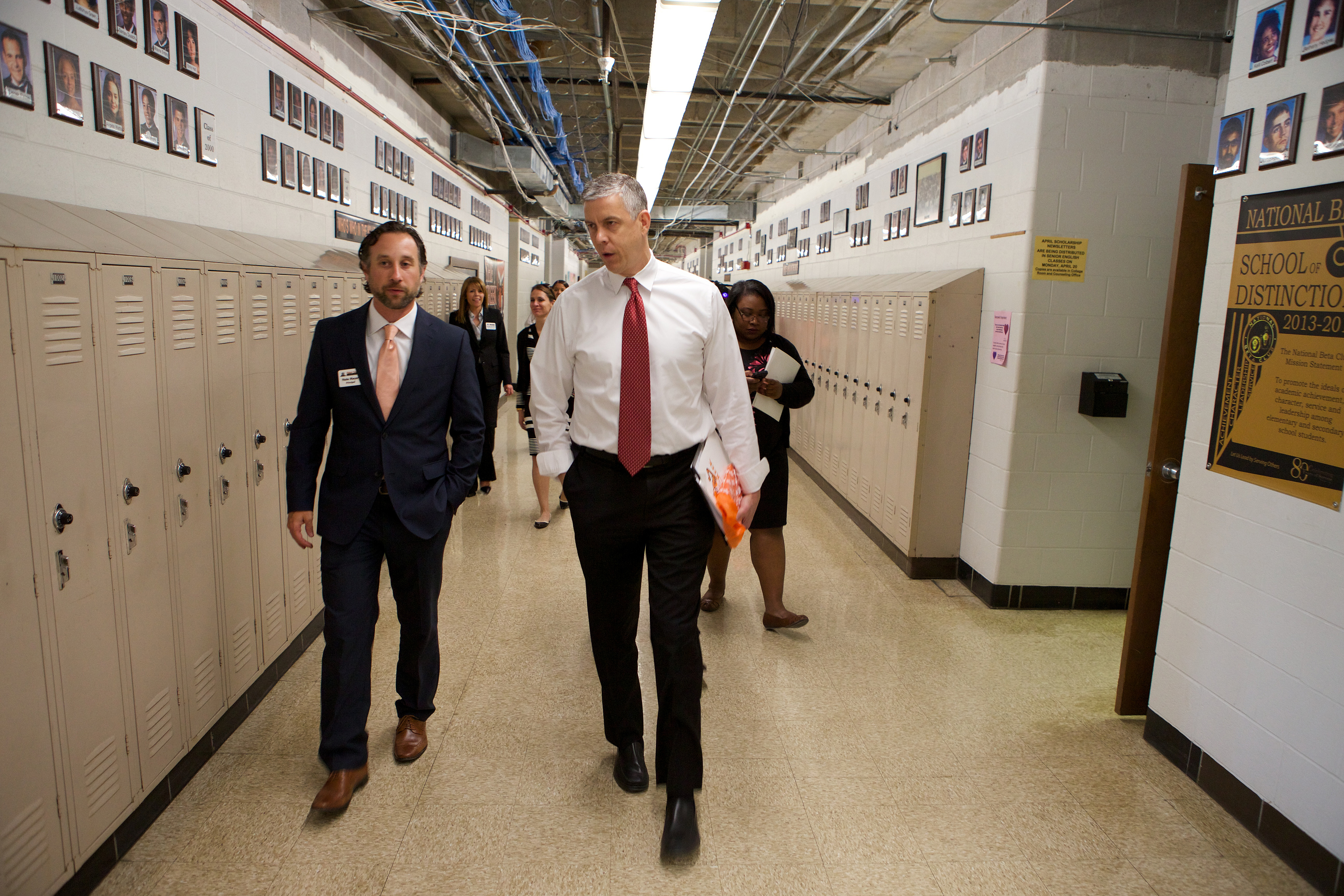
Former principal Dr. Nathan Meyer (left) with U.S. Secretary of Education Arne Duncan in 2015

Fern Creek High School is a communications, JROTC, and a media and arts school in Louisville, Kentucky, United States. It is part of Jefferson County Public Schools. Founded in 1923, it was the first high school in the Jefferson County (Kentucky) School System. It has an enrollment of approximately 1,900 students.

== History ==
On 30 September 2014, at least one shot was fired at the school. One student with non-life-threatening injuries was transported to a local hospital. The high school and a nearby elementary school were placed on lock-down while authorities searched for the gunman. A suspect described as a student was apprehended nearby about three hours after the shooting.

== Academics ==
FCHS provides an academic program with a variety of majors to meet students' diverse career and college interests, and is part of Jefferson County Public School's "Academies of Louisville". Students are in one of four "academies". Incoming students in the 9th grade are in "The Freshman Academy", where they take various exploratory classes and learn about the school's offerings, before selecting an academy, and set of classes called a "pathway", they will take from 10-12th grades. The academies are:

- Communications Academy

Offering: Cinematography & Video Production, Graphic Design, and Management & Entrepreneurship

- Education Academy

Offering: Early Childhood Education, Culinary & Food Services, Consumer & Family Management, and Marine Corpse JROTC

- Tech & Trades Academy

Offering: Computer Science, Automation Engineering, Mechanical Design, Fire Science, and Plumber Assistant

Information for all four academies can be found under "Academics & Academies" on FCHS's Website.

Outside of core and pathway classes, students can be in one of several prestigious academic programs;

=== Honors Program ===
The Honors Program incorporates a more challenging college-preparation sequence with extensive reading and writing activities. Students must maintain a 2.75 grade point average (GPA) on a 4.0 scale to remain in the program.

=== Advanced Placement Courses ===
FCHS offers several Advanced Placement (AP) courses: English Language, English Literature, Spanish, Human Geography, Calculus, World History, U.S. History, Art Studio, Physics, and Statistics. Students who take these courses and then score well on the AP tests may receive college credit. FCTHS faculty members are specifically certified to teach Advanced Placement courses.

=== Beta Club & National Honors Society ===
These clubs require rigorous course loads and maintaining a high GPA to be offered placement. Students who are invited participate in community service, as well as fellowshipping with other high achieving students.

=== MCJORTC Drill Teams ===
The Marine Corps JROTC has won top honors in the country over the past several decades, including the MCROA. The MCROA award is presented to the top JROTC Unit in their perspective region that has shown great acts of leadership, teamwork, and organization within their cadets. The Leatherneck and Lady Leatherneck Drill Teams have also received top honors and titles throughout the years. The Lady Leathernecks won the National High School Drill Team Championships in 1997, and multiple since 2000. They won their 13th consecutive national title in Daytona Beach, Florida on May 7, 2012. The Leathernecks have won multiple runners-up, and place top five in the nation. Since original publication of this page, the drill team has gone on to win several more National Championships, among other prestigious honors. Further solidifying themselves as "The Most Decorated Drill Team in the Country".

=== Ivy Plus Academy ===
Ivy Plus is an application mandatory program within Fern Creek High School. It connects high achieving students with top colleges throughout the US and Canada. The Ivy Plus Academy's purpose is to ensure students’ acceptance into the nation's most selective colleges and universities. Ivy Plus Academy students will travel as a cohort in their core classes to ensure rigorous academic standards and to maintain the integrity of the Ivy Plus Academy philosophy and purpose. Ivy Plus Academy students will take multiple Advanced Placement and dual-credit classes throughout their time at Fern Creek to maximize potential college credit opportunities. Ivy Plus Academy students will have access to one-on-one college counseling services which include college selection, application assistance, financial aid support and extensive college visits. Ivy Plus Academy students will be prioritized and provided. Academy space is limited and preference is given to students within Fern Creek's resides area. Students who are not accepted into the initial Academy cohort will be placed on the waiting list (Students may still choose to attend Fern Creek and may be enrolled in specific Advanced Placement classes as non-Academy participants). Ivy Plus recently earned over $27 million in merit-based scholarships for the class of 2023. And $25.3 million for the class of 2025

Fern Creek also offers two world languages, Spanish and Japanese. As well as a variety of Visual and Performing Arts classes, such as: Choir, Theater, Orchestra, Band, Art.

== Athletics ==
- Fall sports
  - Cheerleading
  - Cross country
  - Dance team
  - Field hockey
  - Football
  - Golf
  - Soccer
  - Girls' Volleyball
  - Quick Recall
- Winter sports
  - Basketball
  - Rifle team
  - Swimming
  - Wrestling
  - Bowling
- Spring sports
  - Baseball
  - Softball
  - Tennis
  - Track
  - Boys' Volleyball

== Notable alumni and faculty ==
Alumni

- Chuck Bradley, American player of gridiron football
- Jamon Brown, professional football player
- Phyllis Burch, professional wrestler
- James R. Ramsey, former president of University of Louisville
- Lee Roberson, Baptist pastor, founder, president, and chancellor of Tennessee Temple University and Temple Baptist Seminary
- Richard Schmidt, college basketball coach
- Mario Urrutia, NFL football player for Cincinnati Bengals, New York Jets, Tampa Bay Buccaneers, Hartford Colonials and Sacramento Mountain Lions

Faculty

- John Givens, former basketball coach

== See also ==
- Public schools in Louisville, Kentucky
