= Fern Creek, Louisville =

Neighborhood in Louisville, Kentucky

Fern Creek is a historic community in southeastern Jefferson County, Kentucky, United States. The population was 20,009 at the 2008 census. In 2003, The area was annexed to the city of Louisville as part of a merger between the city and Jefferson County's unincorporated communities. Fern Creek was formerly a census-designated place. It is now considered a neighborhood of Louisville. It is located about 12 miles (19 km) from Downtown Louisville.

The oldest structure in the area is a log home dating to 1789. The earliest road through the area, Stage Road, connected Louisville to Bardstown, Kentucky. This eventually became the Louisville and Bardstown Turnpike and finally, Bardstown Road. The community was initially known as Stringtown, but was called Fern Creek by the 1870s. Both Union and Confederate armies passed through the area during the American Civil War. An interurban railway line was connected in 1908. The Jefferson County Fairgrounds were located in the area just off Bardstown Road from 1900 to 1928. There is still a "Fairground Road" at that location.

The area was agricultural for much of its history, but has been developed as a suburb of Louisville since the 1960s.

== Geography ==
According to the United States Census Bureau, the CDP has a total area of 5.8 sq mi (15.0 km^{2}), all land.

== Demographics ==
Historical population
Census	Pop.	Note	%±
1980	16,866		—
1990	16,406		−2.7%
2000	17,870		8.9%

As of the census of 2000, there were 17,870 people, 6,652 households, and 5,095 families residing in the CDP. The population density was 1,187.5 people/km^{2} (3,076 people/mi^{2}). There were 7,011 housing units at an average density of 465.9 units/km^{2} (1,207 units/mi^{2}). The racial makeup of the CDP was 87.92% White, 7.81% Black or African American, 0.14% Native American, 1.73% Asian, 0.03% Pacific Islander, 0.98% from other races, and 1.38% from two or more races. Hispanic or Latino of any race were 2.06% of the population.

There were 6,652 households, out of which 37.6% had children under the age of 18 living with them, 61.9% were married couples living together, 11.3% had a female householder with no husband present, and 23.4% were non-families. 17.8% of all households were made up of individuals, and 4.9% had someone living alone who was 65 years of age or older. The average household size was 2.68 and the average family size was 3.04.

In the CDP, the population was spread out, with 26.4% under the age of 18, 9.3% from 18 to 24, 32.2% from 25 to 44, 23.5% from 45 to 64, and 8.7% who were 65 years of age or older. The median age was 35 years. For every 100 females, there were 96.9 males. For every 100 females age 18 and over, there were 95.4 males.

The median income for a household in the CDP was $53,688, and the median income for a family was $60,008. Males had a median income of $41,745 versus $29,099 for females. The per capita income for the CDP was $22,190. About 3.6% of families and 4.7% of the population were below the poverty line, including 6.7% of those under age 18 and 2.5% of those age 65 or over. 20.5% have a bachelor's degree or higher, 11% don't have a high school degree.

== Education ==
Education in the Fern Creek neighborhood is administered by Jefferson County Public Schools, which operates Fern Creek High School.

Fern Creek will have a new lending library, in the fall of 2026, when a branch of the Louisville Free Public Library opens. The local Fern Creek Library was shut down due to Louisville Metro budget cuts in 2019.

== Notable people ==
- Jamon Brown, NFL football player, Los Angeles Rams
- Marvin Hart, boxing champion
- Andrew Hawkins, NFL football player
- Chilton Price, songwriter
- James R. Ramsey, Former president, University of Louisville.
- Mario Urrutia, NFL football player
