= Charles Stevens (pastor) =

American Baptist pastor

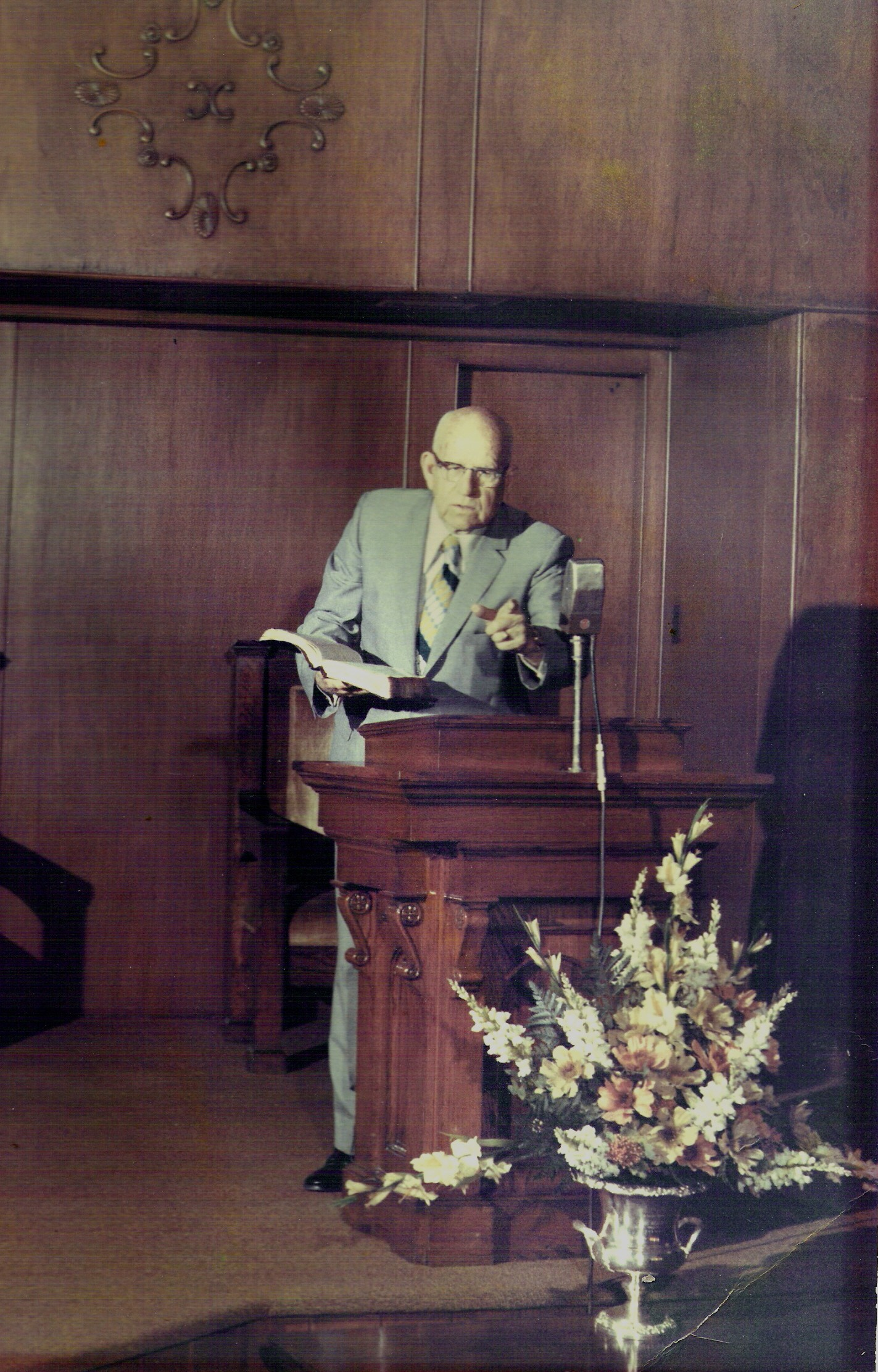
Charles Stevens

Charles Hadley Stevens (January 10, 1892 – July 16, 1982) was a pastor and founder/President of Piedmont Bible College (now Carolina University).

== Childhood ==
Stevens was born on January 10, 1892, to David Samuel and Mary Holt Stevens. Wilson's Mill, North Carolina, was their home until his family moved to Durham, North Carolina, when he was three and two years later to Greensboro, North Carolina. Before his eighth birthday, Charles found himself hard at work in a textile mill to help supplement his family's income. It was during this time that Mary Stevens, Charles' mother, died. His mother was spiritually instrumental in those early years of his life. She read Foster's Story of the Bible to her children. Charles later said that he "believed God called him into the ministry when he was three years old," in part, due to these readings. However, he did not have a "definite conversion experience" until several years later.

A year after his mother's death David Stevens once again moved his family. This time it was back to Wilson's Mill, North Carolina. Buies Creek Academy is where, during this time, Charles Stevens began his first schooling. After only a year and half, Charles was prepared for college. He then enrolled at Wake Forest University. Here he was honored in his studies, ran track, and became "convinced of the Lord's call to Christian service," according to professor William Thompson.

== Early professional life ==
After his graduation from Wake Forest, he entered Southern Baptist Theological Seminary in Louisville, Kentucky. Charles, during his time here, served as pastor of Switzer Baptist Church, in Forks of Elkhorn, Kentucky. In 1917, in the midst of his seminary work, and his pastorate, the United States entered into the Great War. World War I raged across the European Continent and in the United States, Charles Stevens decided to suspend his graduate work and join the Army. Although he wanted to serve as a pilot in the Army, he was posted stateside as a chaplain for nearly two years. After he was discharged, Charles continued at Southern Theological and earned a Th.M. and then began work on his doctorate.

Charles began his first pastorate in 1923 at Cliff Side Baptist Church in Cliff Side, North Carolina. During his tenure there he led the church in the building of a new building. Then on December 1, 1925, Charles accepted the call to be pastor in Winston-Salem, North Carolina, at Salem Baptist Church. He stayed about three years at Salem Baptist. He was very busy during this time. He reorganized the Sunday School and also drew up plans and had work begun on a parsonage. It was during this time as well that became acquainted with Grace Weaver, who had been a student at Southern Theological. They courted and were married on August 19, 1926. Their first child, Grace, was born in September 1927.

Charles left Salem when he accepted the call to the First Baptist Church in Bessemer, Alabama. This ministry marked a major turning point in the life of Charles Stevens. Throughout his ministry, actually starting when he was in college, he was a theistic evolutionist, as well as a postmillennialist. However, a Bible teacher there in Alabama began influencing Charles Stevens. Charles searched the Bible and found "dispensational distinctives and the premillennial return of Christ." With this turn in his way of interpreting the Scriptures came great consequences. His doctoral dissertation on "the influence of the doctrine of the second coming of Christ on the period 1517 to 1648," which was told from a postmillennial viewpoint, was abandoned. His doctoral work at Southern was never completed. About five years were spent in Alabama. He then was called, once again, to Salem Baptist Church.

== Return to Salem Baptist Church ==
Upon his return, the people of Salem Baptist found a man that was more firmly grounded in God's Word and a man more determined and quite capable of teaching and preaching biblical truth. In 1935, Charles Stevens had great success with a series of evening Bible classes. His classes continued and became very popular, attracting the layman and pastor alike from the spiritually barren Winston-Salem area. In the following years, around four hundred attended the classes. Charles Stevens saw that formal education, in many cases, was needed. From this Piedmont Bible Schools was founded. This later turned into Piedmont Bible College, and today is known as Carolina University.

== Latter ministry ==
In 1958, Bob Jones University, in recognition of Charles Stevens "as a Bible preacher and teacher, as well as [for] his contributions as an educator through the establishment of Piedmont Bible College," was given an honorary Doctor of Divinity degree. Stevens remained pastor of Salem Baptist Church and President of Piedmont Bible College for around twenty-five years, with the only exception being a seven or eight month interval when he was not President. After about seven years, Stevens officially resigned on January 27, 1970, but the resignation did not actually become effective until August 1, 1970. Between the conception of the school and his retirement, Stevens witnessed much. The school had reached the "200 mark" in the mid-sixties. It had literally been built before his eyes in about twenty-five years. Stevens resigned as pastor of Salem Baptist on January 9, 1972. Charles Stevens died, at age 90, on July 16, 1982.

== Sources ==
- "Looking Back" by Greg Moore, II
- [www.piedmontu.edu] Official Piedmont Site
