= Temple Baptist Seminary =

Graduate school of Christian theology of Piedmont International University

- Former names: Southeastern Baptist Theological Seminary; Temple Baptist Theological Seminary
- Type: Private
- Founder: Lee Roberson
- Parent institution: Piedmont International University
- Vice-president: Barkev Trachian
- Location: Winston-Salem, North Carolina, U.S. 35.0332°N 85.2771°W
- Former location: Chattanooga, Tennessee
- Former parent institution: Tennessee Temple University
- Website: www.templebaptistseminary.edu

Temple Baptist Seminary is the graduate school of Christian theology of Piedmont International University. Originally established as "Southeastern Baptist Theological Seminary" in Chattanooga, Tennessee in 1948, the name was changed to Temple Baptist Theological Seminary five years later, after the Southern Baptist Convention founded its own Southeastern Baptist Theological Seminary. The seminary became a part of Piedmont when its parent school, Tennessee Temple University, merged with it in 2015.

Temple Baptist Seminary was accredited in 2000 as part of Tennessee Temple University's Transnational Association of Christian Colleges and Schools (TRACS) accreditation. Prior to that it was accredited by the American Association of Bible Colleges (now known as ABHE). Both ABHE and TRACS are accreditors recognized by the US Department of Education and the Council for Higher Education Accreditation.

== History ==
On July 3, 1946, Highland Park Baptist Church, under the leadership of the pastor, Lee Roberson, voted to establish Tennessee Temple College (now University). Then, recognizing the lack of sound Biblical training in the majority of the seminaries, Roberson led the church in establishing Southeastern Baptist Theological Seminary on January 26, 1948. Roberson served as president, and Alfred Cierpke as dean. Five years later, the name was changed to Temple Baptist Theological Seminary since the Southern Baptist Convention founded a seminary by the former name. Since 1985, the institution has been known as Temple Baptist Seminary. In 1962, Douglas Cravens assumed the position of dean.

With the assumption of the presidency of the university and seminary by J. Don Jennings in 1985, Roger Martin was named dean.

In June 1993, the university and the seminary were restructured, placing each under the supervision of a separate Board of Trustees and administrative leadership, while maintaining the identity of each as owned by and a ministry of Highland Park Baptist Church. With respect to the seminary, Lee Roberson was reappointed chancellor, David E. Bouler, who had been the senior pastor of Highland Park Baptist Church since August 4, 1991, was named vice-chancellor and Barkev S. Trachian was elected president. The seminary charter was amended in August 1993, to make the name Temple Baptist Seminary official.

April 2005 saw the university and seminary restructured a second time, reuniting the two under the supervision of a single Board of Trustees and the administration of J. Danny Lovett, the seventh president of Tennessee Temple University, with Temple Baptist Seminary re-establishing itself as the premier graduate division as originally envisioned by the founder, Lee Roberson. This restructure was confirmed in late November 2005 by the university's and seminary's accrediting agency. Fixed firmly to its foundations, Temple Baptist Seminary is committed to training qualified candidates for dynamic leadership in Bible-believing churches and related field ministries, to shaping His shepherds, and to developing disciples with the unchanging Word of God on a global scale.

From the outset, the seminary has been committed to upholding the biblical faith historically believed by Baptists. In addition, there has been a strong emphasis upon Bible teaching, Christian education, evangelism, and ministry endeavors. With the theme "Preparing for Leadership," TBS continues to expand its efforts to equip both church leaders and laypersons for the work of the ministry. In recent years, a program of winter and summer modular classes has been initiated. This program has become very popular with both resident and out-of-town students. Nearly all Temple Baptist Seminary's courses are available on-line, enabling studies anywhere worldwide.

Temple Baptist Seminary has matriculated students from almost every state and from many foreign countries. Many graduates have distinguished themselves as pastors, military and civilian chaplains, teachers, educators, missionaries, and evangelists.

As of January 2012, Steve Echols assumed the leadership role as president of Tennessee Temple University. He brings a vast array of experience and proven leadership in both academic and ministerial areas. In 2012, TTU realigned its academic programs into three colleges of schools. The Seminary became a part of the School of Theology and Ministry. Also in September 2012, Highland Park Baptist Church announced its visions to relocate to Harrison, TN and change its name to Church of the Highlands. During this transition, changes to the TTU by-laws were unanimously ratified by both the Board of Trustees of TTU and the deacon body of the Church of the Highlands. These by-law changes have ended the formal relationship between the two entities. Yet the heritage of Highland Park Baptist Church will remain an essential part of the lasting legacy of TTU.

At the 2013 Tennessee Baptist Convention Annual Meeting, TTU had a booth for the first time in the history of our school. It was a wonderful success resulting in many important contacts and connections being made with Tennessee Baptists. "Even more importantly", TTU President Steve Echols stated, "I am rejoicing over a historic moment for Tennessee Temple University." During the session, the Tennessee Baptist Convention Messengers unanimously adopted a resolution of support which "affirms the actions of Tennessee Temple University (in Chattanooga) in embracing Southern Baptist doctrine and Tennessee Baptist life."

In 2013, Howard D. Owens became the Interim Dean of the School of Theology and Ministry, under the presidency of Steven F. Echols.
