= Asbury Chapel =

Historic church in Tennessee, United States

- Asbury Chapel; Formerly Highland Park M.E. Church and Asbury United Methodist Church
- U.S. National Register of Historic Places
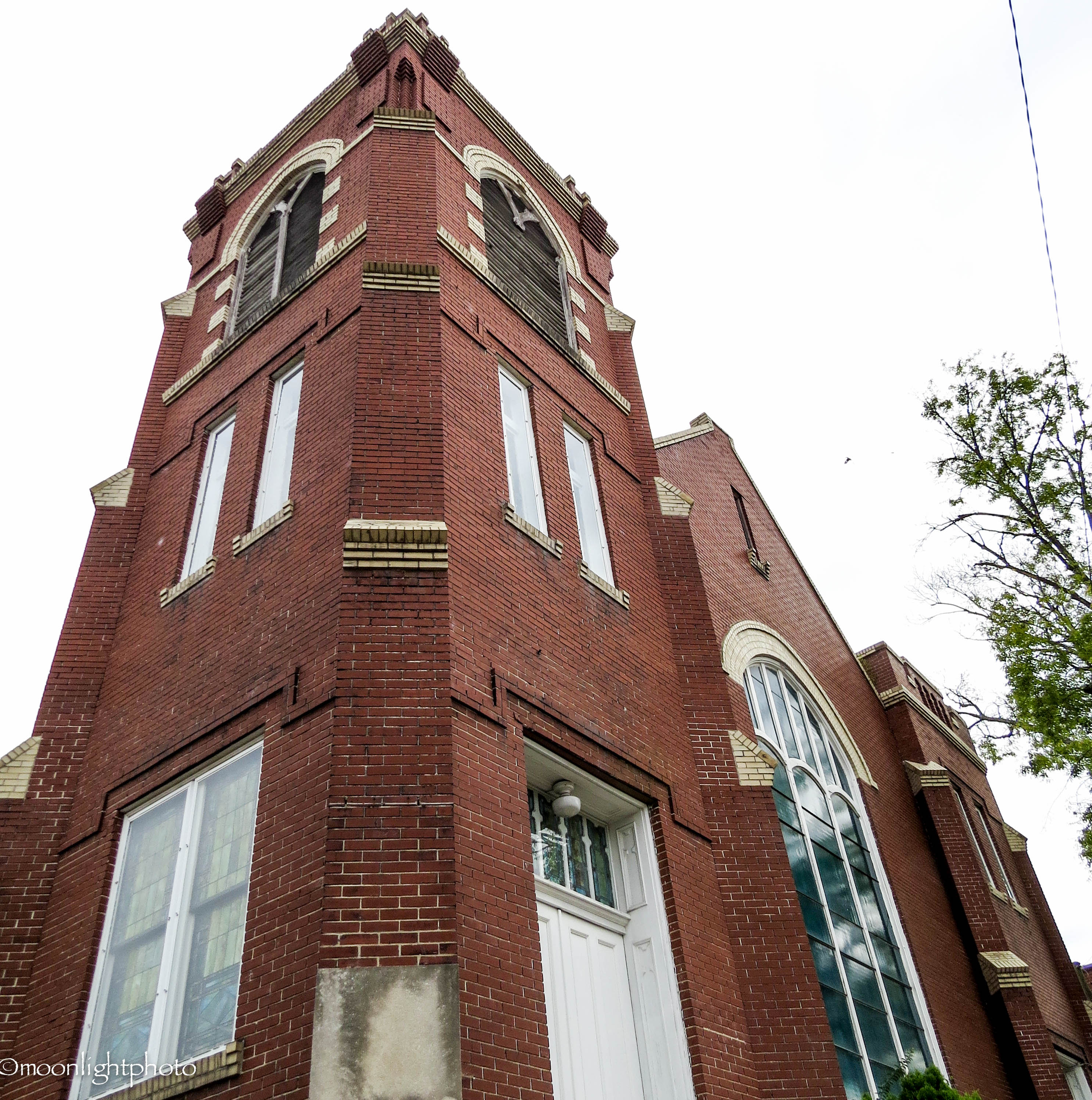

- Location within Tennessee Location within the United States
- Location: 1900 Bailey Ave. Chattanooga, Tennessee
- Coordinates: 35°2′1″N 85°16′32″W
- Area: 1 acre (0.40 ha)
- Built: 1909
- Architect: Reuben Harrison Hunt
- MPS: Hunt, Reuben H., Buildings in Hamilton County TR
- NRHP reference No.: 80003813
- Added to NRHP: February 29, 1980

The Asbury Chapel, originally known as Highland Park Methodist Episcopal Church and later as Asbury United Methodist Church, is a historic church building on Bailey Avenue in Chattanooga, Tennessee, United States. After the Methodist church's closure in 1984, the church building has been used as chapel space for a nearby megachurch: first Highland Park Baptist Church and, since 2014, Redemption to the Nations Church, which bought the Highland Park facilities.

== History ==
The congregation was organized in 1889 as the Highland Park Methodist Episcopal Church. The congregation soon moved into a new frame church that it used for about 20 years before completing the current building. The current church building is a brick structure in a Gothic design created by architect Reuben Harrison Hunt. It was completed in 1909, dedicated in 1911, and added to the National Register of Historic Places in 1980.

Highland Park Methodist Episcopal Church changed its name to Asbury Methodist Church in 1938, when the Methodist Episcopal Church and Methodist Episcopal Church, South, merged. It later added "United" to its name when the United Methodist Church was formed. Another local congregation with a similar name, Highland Park Methodist Episcopal Church, South, became St. Andrew's Methodist Church and later St. Andrew's United Methodist Church. Asbury United Methodist Church closed on July 1, 1984. Its congregation merged with Brainerd United Methodist Church and the church property was sold to Highland Park Baptist Church, which renamed the former Asbury Methodist building the "Asbury Chapel". St. Andrew's closed in 2004.

When Highland Park Baptist Church relocated to Harrison, Tennessee, in 2013, it sold Asbury Chapel and six other buildings in the Highland Park neighborhood to Redemption to the Nations Church, a multisite megachurch based in Ooltewah. Redemption to the Nations renovated the chapel in 2022.
