= Zion College =

Coordinates: 35.0464°N 85.2927°W

Zion College was a Bible institute in Chattanooga, Tennessee. It was founded in 1949 by the Highland Park Baptist Church to train African American ministers and church workers.

In 1964, Zion College was renamed Chattanooga City College. In 1969, the college merged with the University of Chattanooga to form the University of Tennessee at Chattanooga (UTC) as part of the UT System.
