= Chuck Bradley (offensive tackle) =

American football player (born 1970)

No. 60, 76, 64, 65
- Position: Offensive tackle

Personal information
- Born: April 9, 1970 (age 56); Covington, Kentucky, U.S.
- Listed height: 6 ft 5 in (1.96 m)
- Listed weight: 296 lb (134 kg)

Career information
- High school: Fern Creek (Louisville, Kentucky)
- College: Kentucky
- NFL draft: 1993: 6th round, 158th overall pick

Career history
- Houston Oilers (1993)*; Cincinnati Bengals (1993); New York Giants (1995)*; → Barcelona Dragons (1995); Memphis Mad Dogs (1995); Minnesota Vikings (1996)*; → Barcelona Dragons (1996); Toronto Argonauts (1996); BC Lions (1997)
- * Offseason or practice squad member only

Career NFL statistics
- Games played: 1
- Stats at Pro Football Reference

Charles Warren Bradley II (born April 9, 1970) is an American former professional football player who was an offensive tackle for one season with the Cincinnati Bengals of the National Football League (NFL). He was selected by the Houston Oilers in the sixth round of the 1993 NFL draft after playing college football for the Kentucky Wildcats. Bradley was also a member of the New York Giants and Minnesota Vikings of the NFL, the Barcelona Dragons of the World League of American Football (WLAF), and the Memphis Mad Dogs, Toronto Argonauts and BC Lions of the Canadian Football League (CFL).

== Early life and college ==
Charles Warren Bradley II was born on April 9, 1970, in Covington, Kentucky. He attended Fern Creek High School in Louisville, Kentucky.

He lettered for the Kentucky Wildcats from 1989 to 1992.

== Professional career ==
Bradley was selected by the Houston Oilers in the sixth round, with the 158th overall pick, of the 1993 NFL draft. He officially signed with the team on July 16, but was later waived on August 29, 1993.

Bradley was claimed off waivers by the Cincinnati Bengals on August 30, 1993. He played in one game for the Bengals during the 1993 season. He was released on August 10, 1994.

Bradley signed with the New York Giants in 1975. He was allocated to the World League of American Football (WLAF) to play for the Barcelona Dragons during the 1995 WLAF season, and recorded one tackle on a turnover. He was later released by the Giants. Bradley also played in seven games for the Memphis Mad Dogs of the Canadian Football League (CFL) during the 1995 CFL season and made one tackle.

Bradley signed with the Minnesota Vikings in 1996 and was allocated to the WLAF to play for the Dragons for the second consecutive season, and posted one tackle that season. He was later released by the Vikings. He also played in 12 games for the CFL's Toronto Argonauts that year, totaling three tackles.

He appeared in 14 games for the BC Lions of the CFL in 1997, recording one fumble recovery and one tackle. He was an offensive tackle for his entire pro career except for the 1997 season with the Lions, in which he was listed as a center.
