= Carolina University =

Private Christian university in North Carolina, U.S.

- University Logo
- Former names: Piedmont Baptist College; Piedmont Bible College; Piedmont International University
- Motto: GRATIAE ET VERITATIS
- Motto in English: Grace and Truth
- Type: Private university
- Established: 1945
- Founders: Charles H. Stevens
- Religious affiliation: Christian
- President: Charles Petitt
- Provost: Heather Burkard
- Students: 826
- Undergraduates: 350
- Postgraduates: 476
- Location: 420 S. Broad St, Winston-Salem, North Carolina, 27101, United States; 36.0879°N 80.2501°W
- Campus: Urban
- Language: English
- Colors: Blue, gold, & red
- Nickname: Bruins
- Sporting affiliations: NAIA - CAC; NCCAA - South Region
- Mascot: Baron the Bruin
- Website: carolinau.edu

Carolina University (CU), formerly Piedmont International University (PIU), is a private Christian university in Winston-Salem, North Carolina, United States. Carolina University offers both residential and online programs including dual enrollment, undergraduate, and graduate degrees. It is accredited by the Transnational Association of Christian Colleges and Schools (TRACS) and is a member of the American Association of Christian Schools (AACS).

== History ==
In 1945, Charles Stevens and a group of North Carolina Baptist leaders founded Piedmont Bible Schools, Inc. and opened Piedmont Bible Institute. Three years later, the institute added two years of junior college. Although the academy associated with Piedmont Bible Schools, Inc. was discontinued in 1952, the Bible institute and the college continued.

In 1956 Piedmont completed the accreditation requirements of the Accrediting Association of Bible Institutes and Bible Colleges (now The Association for Biblical Higher Education). Their acceptance allowed Religious Education and Theology bachelor's degrees to be awarded, starting in 1957, with the acceptance of the State Department of Education.

The college added a graduate program in 1994 and joined the Transnational Association of Christian Colleges and Schools (TRACS) one year later. In 2004, Spurgeon Baptist Bible College of Mulberry, Florida, merged with PIU to create Piedmont's Spurgeon School of Online Education, which allowed several undergraduate and graduate programs to be available entirely online, including a master's degree in Biblical Studies offered in Spanish. The accreditation of two international branch campuses in restricted access nations sprang from partnerships with nationals in Asia and the Middle East.

In 2012, Piedmont officially changed their name from Piedmont Baptist College and Graduate School to Piedmont International University.

In the mid-2010s, three institutions were merged into Piedmont. In 2015, Tennessee Temple University of Chattanooga, Tennessee, dissolved and merged with Piedmont. Southeastern Bible College of Birmingham, Alabama, closed in 2017, merging with PIU later that year. In 2018, John Wesley University, a small evangelical college approximately 19 miles from Piedmont's Winston-Salem campuses, merged with Piedmont.

In 2019, PIU started partnerships collaborating with Sheriff's Offices in North Carolina and Tennessee to create a collaborative criminal justice degree program with law enforcement.

On June 24, 2020, the Piedmont International University Board of Trustees voted to change the university's name to Carolina University. The Piedmont School of Divinity (or Piedmont Divinity School) was created to "honor Piedmont's historic name and heritage of training ministers and teaching Bible and theology."

In July 2024, Hanesbrands announced it would move its headquarters to the Park Building in downtown Winston-Salem and that Carolina University would take over the Oak Summit headquarters. The university said it had no room to expand where it was, and that Salem Baptist Church would take over the existing campus to expand its Christian school.

=== Mergers and acquisitions ===
Several Christian colleges and universities have merged with Carolina University over the years.

Spurgeon Baptist Bible College was established in 1970 in Lakeland, Florida, as a college for training preachers and missionaries. The first president of the college was Dr. G. Arthur Woolsey, a Baptist Bible Seminary graduate. The college merged with Piedmont International University in 2003, and PIU's Spurgeon School of Online Education was created as a result of the merger.

Atlantic Baptist Bible College was located in Chester, Virginia, where it served to prepare men and women for effective ministry in churches. The school merged with Piedmont International University in December, 2008.

Tennessee Temple University and Temple Baptist Seminary were located in Chattanooga, Tennessee. The university opened in 1946, followed by the opening of the seminary in 1948. During the 65-year life of the school, it served over 100,000 students. TTU became the third school to merge with Piedmont International University, the process of which was completed in 2015. As a result of the merger, degree programs including Sign Language Interpretation were added to PIU's offerings. Additionally, the Temple Baptist Seminary name transitioned to Piedmont International University. The John Wesley School of Leadership was also created from TTU assets.

Southeastern Bible College was located in Birmingham, Alabama, where they provided Bible, theology, ministry, and missions degree programs. The school was founded in 1935 by Edgar J. Rowe. In 2017, the school closed due to financial struggles, but after three months, SEBC merged with Piedmont International University.

John Wesley University (located in High Point, North Carolina, merged with Piedmont International University in 2018, becoming the fifth school to do so. Founded in 1903, it was the oldest undergraduate theological education institution in North Carolina.

== Academics ==
Carolina University comprises five undergraduate and graduate schools.

- School of Arts and Sciences
- Patterson School of Business
- Moore School of Education
- John Wesley School of Leadership
- Piedmont Divinity School

The School of Arts and Sciences is home to several new undergraduate programs in areas including Public Health, Esports, Information Systems, Psychology, Sociology, Criminal Justice and Interdisciplinary Studies. CU's Patterson School of Business offers both undergraduate and graduate business programs including the BBA and MBA. The Moore School of Education at CU offers both undergraduate and graduate programs. Key programs include the BS in Deaf Studies, the BS in Elementary Education, and the Master of Education. The John Wesley School of Leadership, named as a result of the merger with John Wesley University, is home to two graduate leadership programs: the M.A. in leadership and the Ph.D. in leadership. The Piedmont Divinity School at Carolina University comprises all the ministry and Bible-related degree programs at the university. These schools offer programs such as the 5-Year BA and M.Div., various Biblical Studies degrees, and two Graduate Certificates.

== Athletics ==
The Carolina University athletic teams are called the Bruins. The university participates as a member of the National Association of Intercollegiate Athletics (NAIA), primary competing as an Independent within the Continental Athletic Conference since the 2024–25 academic year. The Bruins are also a member of the National Christian College Athletic Association (NCCAA) at the Division I ranks in the South Region.

The university currently fields 11 intercollegiate sports teams. Men's sports include baseball, basketball, cross country, soccer, men's volleyball, and track and field. Women's sports include basketball, cross country, soccer, softball, track and field, and volleyball.

The university's athletic department expanded in recent years, growing from three sports in 2017 to nine in two years. CU plans to add several more, including the additions of men's volleyball and women's cheerleading in 2020–21. The university also moved the athletics department from NCCAA Division II to the Division I level and added athletic scholarship opportunities. One notable former coach is Josh Howard, a former NBA All-Star player and Dallas Mavericks player. Howard got his start in collegiate coaching as the CU men's basketball head coach from 2016 to 2020.
