= Kay Arthur =

American Christian author and Bible teacher (1933–2025)

- Born: Kay Lee; November 11, 1933; Jackson, Michigan, U.S.
- Died: May 20, 2025 (aged 91); Chattanooga, Tennessee, U.S.
- Education: Tennessee Temple University
- Occupation: Bible teacher; author
- Spouses: Frank Thomas Goetz, Jr. (m. 1955; div. 1961) Jack Arthur (m. 1965; died 2017)
- Children: 3
- Religion: Christian
- Church: Interdenominational; evangelical
- Title: Co-founder − Precept Ministries

Kay Lee Arthur (November 11, 1933 – May 20, 2025) was an American Christian author, Bible teacher and co-founder of Precept Ministries International. She was a four-time winner of the ECPA Christian Book Award.

== Early life and education ==
Kay Lee Arthur was born on November 11, 1933, in Jackson, Michigan. She grew up in a religious household, and her father was an Episcopal lay leader.

Arthur graduated from nursing school at Case Western Reserve University in 1955 when she was 21 years old and married her first husband, Frank Thomas Goetz, Jr when she was 20. Although they had two children together, the marriage dissolved, and the couple divorced in 1961. Arthur then Previously disconnected from her religion, Arthur became newly committed to Christianity in 1963.

Following Frank's death, Arthur moved to Chattanooga, Tennessee, to attend Tennessee Temple University, where she earned a Nursing diploma. There, she met Jack Arthur (b. March 14, 1926), who had graduated from TTU with a Graduate in Theology in 1956. The couple married on December 16, 1965, and served as missionaries in Mexico. However, Jack's medical issues forced them to leave Mexico and return to the US.

== Career ==
=== Precept Ministries International ===
After returning to Chattanooga, Arthur began teaching teenagers about the Bible in the couple's living room while Jack took over as manager of a local Christian radio station.

As the Bible study group expanded, a 32-acre (13-hectare) farm was bought in order to accommodate the growing ministry. It was originally given the name Reach Out Ranch, but later became Precept Ministries International (PMI). The radio station was sold in 1972, and Jack became a full-time administrator for the ranch. Arthur hosted a daily radio, television and online Bible study teaching program called Precepts for Life.

In November 2009, Arthur signed an ecumenical statement known as the Manhattan Declaration with the aim of requesting evangelicals, Catholics and Orthodox Christians not to comply with rules and laws permitting abortion, same-sex marriage and other matters that go against their religious consciences.

In 2016, Arthur spoke at The Gathering, a religious rally promoting Donald Trump's presidential campaign.

Arthur spoke at several colleges, including Liberty University in 2015 and Union University in 2017.

== Personal life and death ==
She had three sons (two from her first marriage, one from her second) and nine grandchildren.

Her husband, Jack, died from Alzheimer's disease in Chattanooga on January 9, 2017, at age 90.

Arthur died on May 20, 2025, at the age of 91.

== Publishing ==
Arthur won Gold Medallion Book Awards for her books A Marriage Without Regrets, The New Inductive Study Bible, His Imprint My Expression, and Lord, I Need Grace to Make It Today.

=== Selected works ===
- Lord, Teach Me to Pray, video teaching series ISBN 978-1-4158-3212-7
- Lord, I Need Grace to Make It Today, (1991) ISBN 1-57856-441-7
- As Silver Refined (1997)
- A Marriage Without Regrets (2001) ISBN 0-7369-2075-7
- The New Inductive Study Bible, (2010) ISBN 0-7369-0016-0
- His Imprint My Expression ISBN 1-56507-399-1
- How To Study Your Bible, ISBN 0-7369-0544-8

== Awards ==
She was awarded the NRB Hall of Fame Award at the National Religious Broadcasters (NRB) Convention and Exposition in 2011.

Arthur received a Doctor of Humane Letters from Tennessee Temple University in Chattanooga in 2007.
