= Richard Schmidt (basketball) =

American college basketball coach (born 1942)

Richard Schmidt (born September 3, 1942) is a retired men's college basketball coach, most notably serving at the University of Tampa (NCAA Division II), where he served from 1983 to 2023.

Prior to his tenure at Tampa, Schmidt coached the Vanderbilt University for two seasons, and was an assistant for the University of Virginia. He began his coaching career in 1969 at Ballard High School in Louisville, Kentucky where he had a record of 183–32 in seven seasons, including the state championship in 1977.

While at Ballard High School, he coached future Virginia Cavalier and NBA player Jeff Lamp. He went to Virginia with Lamp and two other former Ballard players.

Schmidt played at Fern Creek High School ('60) in Louisville and is a 1964 graduate of Western Kentucky University.

== Head coaching record ==
Record table
Season	Team	Overall	Conference	Standing	Postseason
Vanderbilt (Southeastern Conference) (1979–1981)
1979–80	Vanderbilt	13–13	7–11	6th	
1980–81	Vanderbilt	15–14	7–11	7th	
Vanderbilt:		28–27	14–22		
Total:		28–27			
National champion Postseason invitational champion Conference regular season champion Conference regular season and conference tournament champion Division regular season champion Division regular season and conference tournament champion Conference tournament champion

== See also ==
- List of college men's basketball coaches with 600 wins
