= Highland Park, Chattanooga =

Neighborhood in Chattanooga, Tennessee, United States

Coordinates: 35.033°N 85.280°W

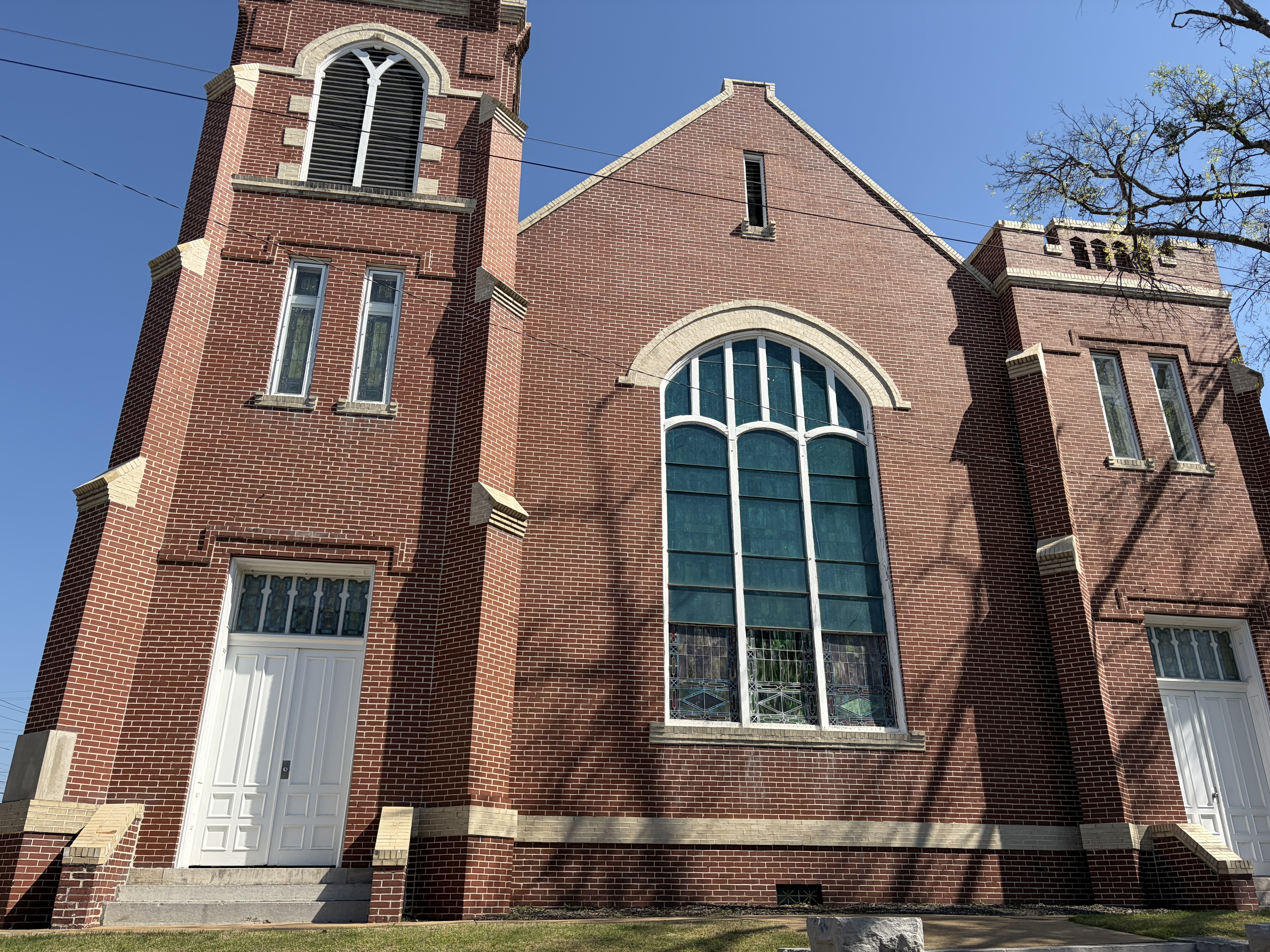
Asbury Chapel, a National Register of Historic Places-listed property in Highland Park

Highland Park is a neighborhood in the city of Chattanooga, Tennessee. It originally was a small city developed between the late 19th century and the mid-20th century. It is located two miles east of downtown Chattanooga, and bounded by Willow and Holtzclaw streets on the east and west, and McCallie and Main streets on the north and south. It was incorporated in 1905. Later, when it was incorporated into the City of Chattanooga in 1929, it grew to become a popular middle-class suburb with access to multiple train lines. As employment and much downtown property value in Chattanooga declined throughout the 1970s, Highland Park did as well, but it has had significant recent success due to its proximity to the downtown, its vibrant neighborhood association, and many newly renovated historic houses.

== Makeup ==
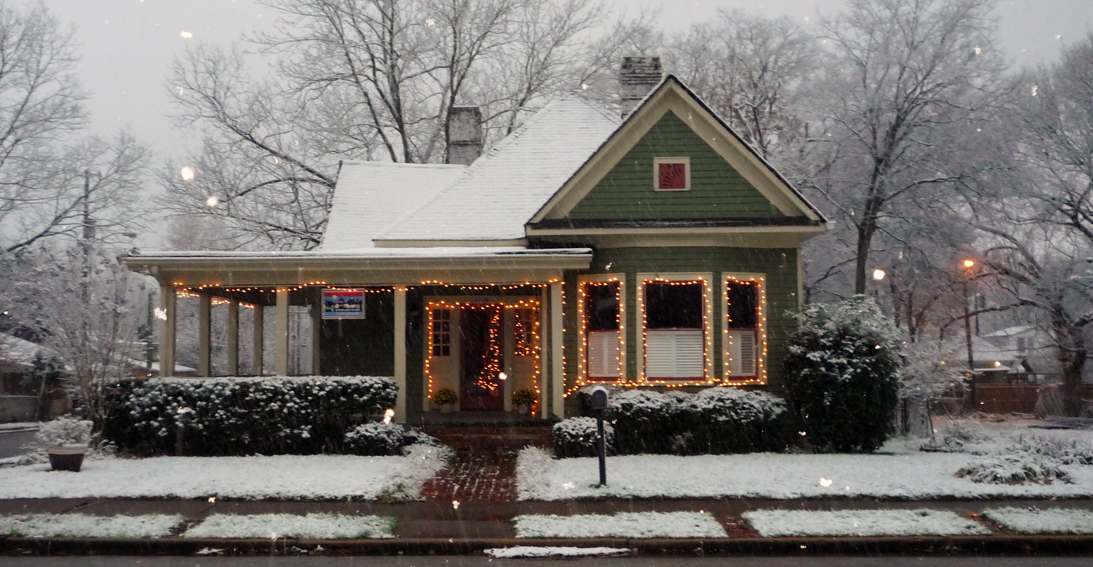
Queen Anne Bungalow in Highland Park during a snowstorm

The neighborhood has around 1,000 homes and is home to three parks. Shaw Park is a pocket park owned by the Highland Park Neighborhood Association and located on South Highland Park Avenue and Kirby Avenue. Shaw Park provides the community with a small picnic and playground area with equipment donated by PlayCore in 2007. Tatum Park is a city-owned green park located on Union Avenue between South Holly and South Hickory. The Highland Park Commons is a privately owned public park located on Union Avenue, on the eastern border of the neighborhood, adjacent to the Ridgedale community. The Highland Park Commons has a playground area, pavilions, picnic space, and soccer fields. The park aspires to be a geographic nucleus for the growing Hispanic population in the city. It is also a weekly location for the YMCA Mobile Market.

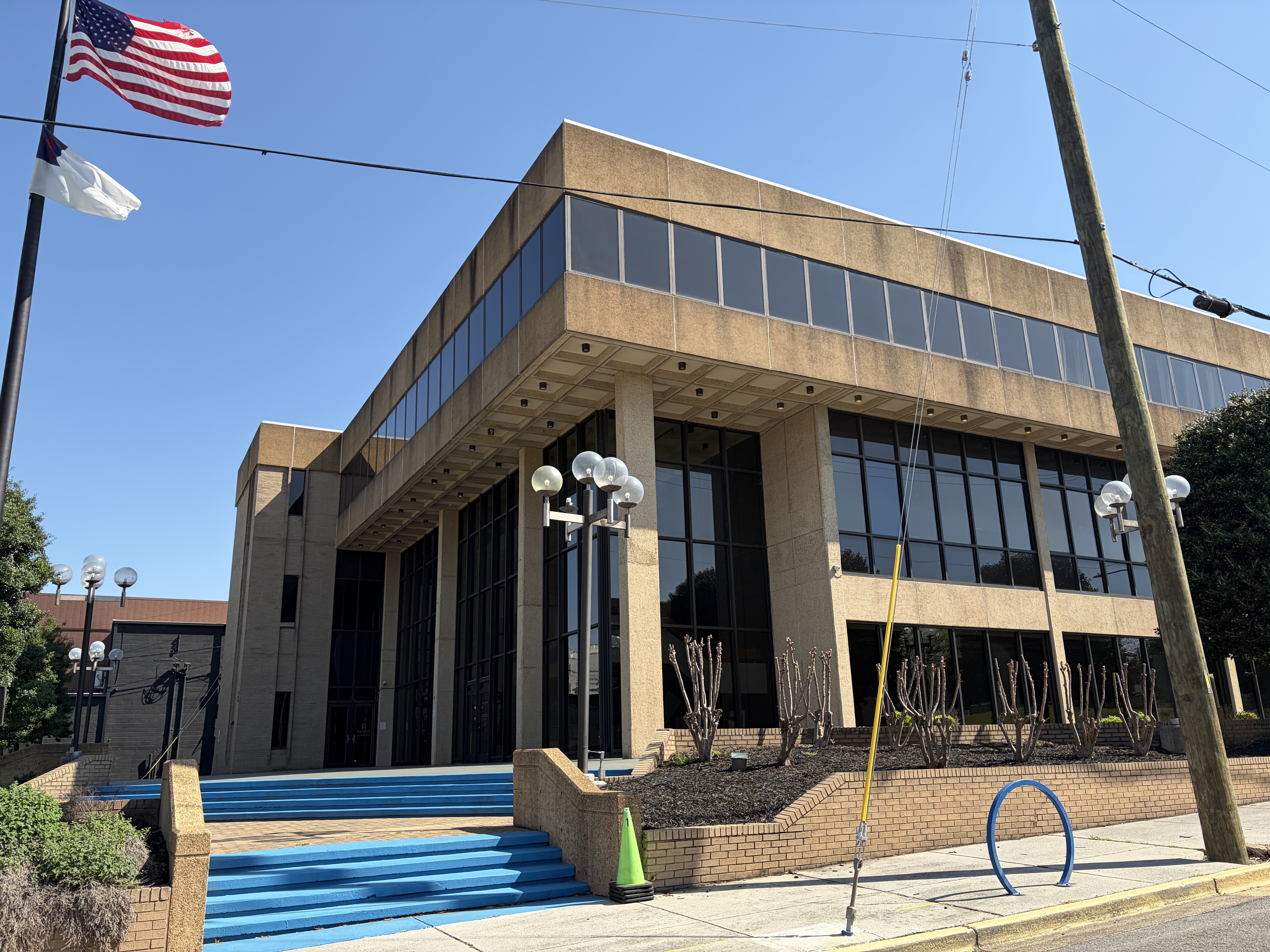
The Ark Academy, formerly a building of Tennessee Temple University and now a PK-12 Christian school run by Redemption to the Nations in Highland Park

The homes in the neighborhood consist of a variety of renovated and original middle-class family homes, with the vast majority being built between 1900 and 1930. The creation and development of both the Highland Park Baptist Church and Tennessee Temple University had a significant impact on the neighborhood throughout the middle of the 20th century. Both of those organizations have now either closed or moved out of Highland Park. Redemption to the Nations Church, Chattanooga Girls Leadership Academy, and Chattanooga Preparatory have purchased and operate most of the vacated properties. A few key lots have been purchased by Chattanooga Neighborhood Enterprise, an organization dedicated to supporting neighborhood development and revitalization, and providing quality affordable housing options in the city of Chattanooga.

== Revitalization ==
The revitalization of the neighborhood started in the early 1990s and continues to the present. In 2001 the neighborhood was awarded "Neighborhood of the Year" by Neighborhoods, USA. The neighborhood and its homes have been featured in Southern Living (May 2002), Victorian Times Magazine (October 2002), HGTV (September 2006), and the Financial Times (April 2010). Highland Park has grown to be one of Chattanooga's largest urban neighborhoods, with an excellent variety of architecture from the 1880s to the 1920s, specifically Queen Anne, Bungalow, and Craftsman, as well as many others.
