= Jamon Brown =

American football player (born 1993)

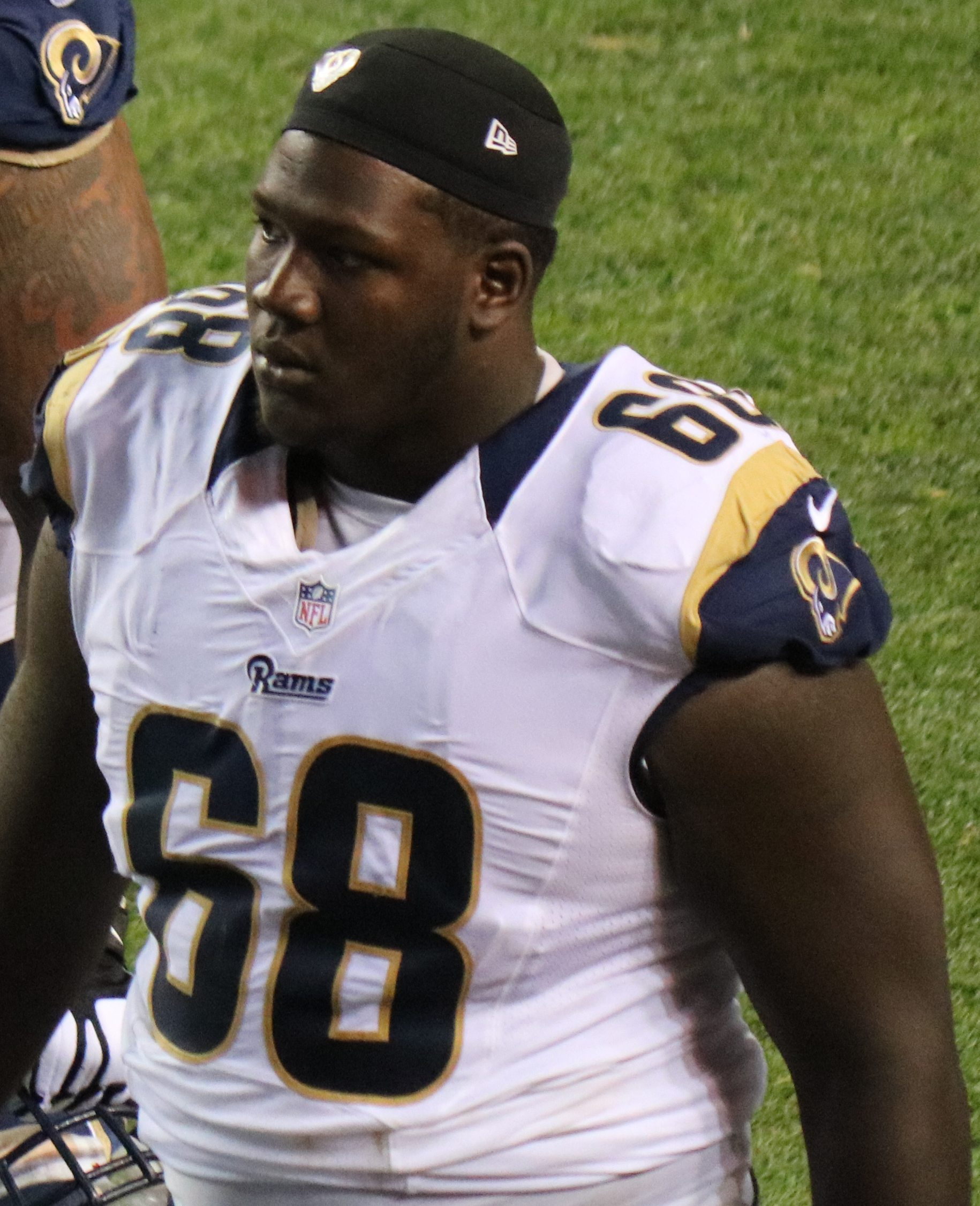
- Brown with the Los Angeles Rams in 2016

No. 68, 78, 66
- Position: Guard

Personal information
- Born: March 15, 1993 (age 33); Louisville, Kentucky, U.S.
- Listed height: 6 ft 4 in (1.93 m)
- Listed weight: 340 lb (154 kg)

Career information
- High school: Fern Creek (Louisville)
- College: Louisville (2011–2014)
- NFL draft: 2015: 3rd round, 72nd overall pick

Career history
- St. Louis / Los Angeles Rams (2015–2018); New York Giants (2018); Atlanta Falcons (2019); Chicago Bears (2020)*; Philadelphia Eagles (2020)
- * Offseason or practice squad member only

Awards and highlights
- Second-team All-ACC (2014)

Career NFL statistics
- Games played: 62
- Games started: 48
- Stats at Pro Football Reference

Jamon Brown (born March 15, 1993) is an American former professional football player who was a guard in the National Football League (NFL). He played college football for the Louisville Cardinals and was selected by the St. Louis Rams in the third round of the 2015 NFL draft.

He was also a member of the New York Giants, Atlanta Falcons, Chicago Bears and Philadelphia Eagles.

== College career ==
Brown was a starter for the Louisville Cardinals from 2014 to 2015.

== Professional career ==
Pre-draft measurables
Height	Weight	Arm length	Hand span	40-yard dash	10-yard split	20-yard split	20-yard shuttle	Three-cone drill	Vertical jump	Broad jump
6 ft 3 5/8 in (1.92 m)	323 lb (147 kg)	34 3/8 in (0.87 m)	9 3/4 in (0.25 m)	5.08 s	1.74 s	2.95 s	4.61 s	7.36 s	24 in (0.61 m)	8 ft 7 in (2.62 m)
All values from NFL draft

=== St. Louis / Los Angeles Rams ===
Brown was drafted by the St. Louis Rams in the 3rd round, 72nd overall, in the 2015 NFL draft. He signed a rookie contract worth $2,496,158 over four years. On November 17, 2015, he was placed on injured reserve due to a lower leg fracture. He then returned to play right guard for the Rams.

In 2017, Brown opened the season as the starting right guard. He started all 16 games.

On July 3, 2018, Brown was suspended the first two games of the 2018 season for violating the NFL Policy and Program for Substances of Abuse. In his absence, Austin Blythe took over Brown's previous starting role at right guard, and kept the job upon Brown's return from suspension. On October 30, 2018, he was waived by the Rams.

=== New York Giants ===
On October 31, 2018, Brown was claimed off waivers by the New York Giants. He was named the Giants starting right guard in Week 10, and remained there the rest of the season.

=== Atlanta Falcons ===
On March 13, 2019, Brown signed a three-year, $18.75 million contract with the Atlanta Falcons. Brown competed with veteran James Carpenter and rookie Chris Lindstrom for a starting guard spot. He was named a backup guard to start the season, but was named the starting right guard prior to Week 2 following an injury to Lindstrom. He was benched in the final games of the season.

Brown was released on August 24, 2020.

=== Chicago Bears ===
Brown was signed to the practice squad of the Chicago Bears on September 6, 2020.

=== Philadelphia Eagles ===
On September 15, 2020, Brown was signed by the Philadelphia Eagles off the Bears practice squad. He started Week 6 at right guard as an injury replacement to Matt Pryor. He was released on October 21, but re-signed to the team's practice squad the following day. He was elevated to the active roster on October 22 for the team's week 7 game against the Giants, and reverted to the practice squad after the game. Brown was released on December 7 after violating team rules and being kicked out of the team's hotel prior to a game against the Green Bay Packers.

== Personal life ==
Brown has a daughter named Micayla.
