= Precept Ministries International =

American Christian evangelical organization

Precept is an interdenominational Christian evangelical organization based in Chattanooga, Tennessee, US.

The organization’s stated mission is to bring people into a close relationship with God through scriptural Bible studies. PMI ministers to adults, teens and children through leader training workshops, Bible studies, and a tour to biblical sites in Israel.

The organization is a nonprofit ministry and a member of the Evangelical Council for Financial Accountability (ECFA).

== History ==
The ministry was founded by Jack and Kay Arthur in 1970. It was originally named ‘’Reach Out’’, and ran from the Arthurs’ farm in Tennessee Valley. After writing the first Precept Upon Precept Study guide on the Book of Romans, the ministry was renamed in 1982 and became Precept Ministries.

In 1999, the first training international institute was formed in Romania.

In 2008 Precept made $12.9 million in revenue. In 2021 Precept received almost $11 million in revenue.

Jack and Kay's son, David Arthur, took over as CEO in 2012.

== Ministries ==
=== Student Ministry ===
Transform Student Ministries is a department of Precept which ministers to minors, especially those in high school and college. Annually, they offer the ENGAGE Internship which takes place over a 10-week span between May through July to train college-age students and young adults to engage in God's Word through the Inductive Bible Study method.

Prior to 2022, Precept held an ENCOUNTER Student Conference twice a year in fall and winter, as well as the EQUIP Boot Camp program each June and early July. In 2022 Precept stopped offering their summer Boot Camp and Encounter conferences.

== Programs ==
=== Bible Study Training ===
Precept's main method of engaging people with God is by equipping them to become Precept Bible Study Leaders through training workshops both nationally and internationally. The year-round training and resources Precept offers are designed to increase Bible study and leadership skills. After being trained, leaders are sent back to their local communities to lead small group Bible Studies using the Precept Bible Study Method.

=== Precepts for Life ===
Precept produced Kay Arthur's daily radio and television program Precepts for Life, which provides instruction in Bible study. In 2009 the program received the National Religious Broadcasters' award for "Best Television Teaching Program.". Kay Arthur was named to the National Religious Broadcasters Hall of Fame in 2011.

== Publishing ==
Precept also publishes books and Bible studies that have been translated into 70 languages.
