= Cogitatio Press =

Academic publisher based in Portugal

- Founded: 2014; 12 years ago
- Founder: António Vieira
- Country of origin: Portugal
- Headquarters location: Lisbon
- Publication types: academic journals
- Official website: www.cogitatiopress.com

Cogitatio Press is a Portuguese open access publisher founded in 2014, hosting four scientific peer-reviewed journals, mostly dedicated to the social sciences, in particular to media, politics, social inclusion and urban planning.

== Aims and format ==
The publisher’s model is based on publishing thematic issues in open access, whose articles are peer-reviewed by specialists in the field and posteriorly accepted or rejected for publication by the Academic Editors of the issue.

The publishers' aim is to disseminate quality research in open access, because it believes that "open-source knowledge generates something more valuable, benefiting researchers, policy-makers and society in general."

Currently, each journal of Cogitatio Press publishes an average of 12 thematic issues per year, each dedicated to a specific topic.

== Journals ==
Cogitatio has four open access journals. Three of these journals migrated from a previous publisher named Librello. Later on, the publisher launched a fourth journal. Currently hosts four journals:

- Media and Communication
- Ocean and Society
- Politics and Governance
- Social Inclusion
- Urban Planning

All these journals are indexed in the Web of Science and Scopus, two indexing and abstracting databases widely used by the scholarly community.
