= Fern Creek (Alberta) =

Stream in Alberta, Canada

Coordinates: 53.10444°N 114.2686°W

Fern Creek is an unincorporated in Alberta, Canada.

It was named for a nearby creek with ferns growing on its banks. At one time, it had a post office.
