= Highland Park Baptist Church =

Coordinates: 35.0326°N 85.2750°W

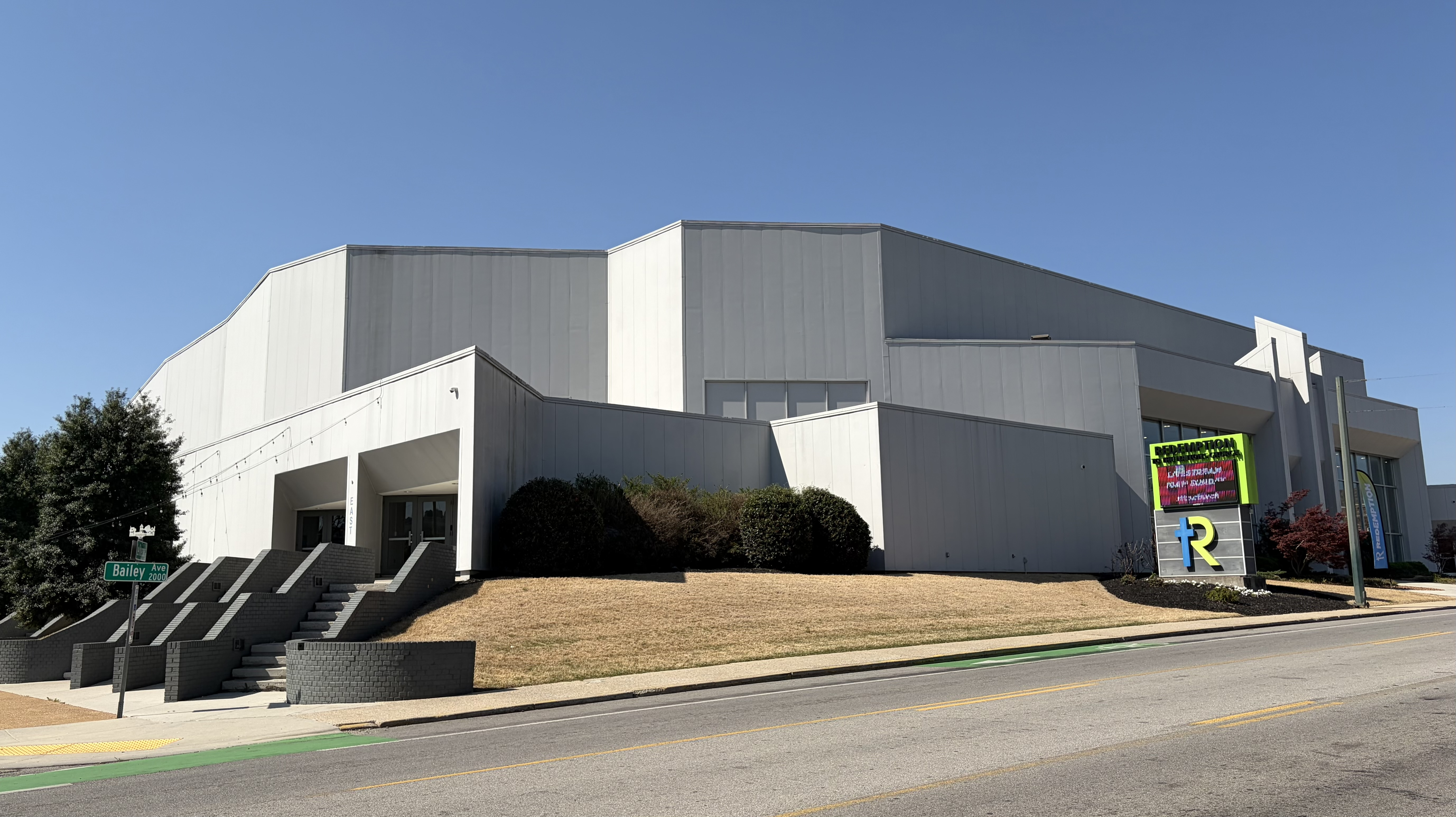
- The 1981 auditorium on Bailey Avenue, since 2014 the site of Redemption to the Nations
- Location: Chattanooga, Tennessee
- Country: U.S.
- Denomination: Baptist
- Previous denomination: Independent Baptist

History
- Former name(s): Orchard Knob Baptist Church; Beech Street Baptist Church
- Founded: 1890

Clergy
- Pastor: Lee Roberson (1942-83)

Highland Park Baptist Church was a prominent Independent Baptist church in the Highland Park neighborhood of Chattanooga, Tennessee. During the four-decade pastorship of Dr. Lee Roberson, it was a center of the Independent Baptist movement and became an early megachurch.

In 2013, the church changed its name to "Church of the Highlands," sold its Chattanooga property, and moved to a smaller facility near Chattanooga. Several of its former church buildings in Chattanooga were destroyed by a massive fire in June 2022.

== History ==
The church was founded in 1890 as Orchard Knob Baptist Church, was soon renamed to Beech Street Baptist Church, and became Highland Park Baptist Church in 1903 when it moved to a new location at the corner of Orchard Knob and Union Avenue. The church's wood-frame building was replaced by a brick church (later known as Phillips Memorial Chapel) in about 1922.

Lee Roberson became the church's pastor in 1942. In 1946, during his leadership, Tennessee Temple University was established as an adjunct to the church, and the church and university were considered centers of the Independent Baptist movement. The church membership grew dramatically, reportedly reaching a peak of about 57,000 in the early 1980s. A 3000-seat auditorium building, later known as the Chauncey-Goode Auditorium, was completed in 1947, followed in 1981 by a 6000-seat auditorium building on Bailey Avenue.

In 1983, Dr. Roberson resigned as pastor of the Highland Park Baptist Church, becoming its pastor emeritus. In later years, membership and attendance declined. As of 2012, weekly attendance averaged around 370 people. In January 2013, the church changed its name to "Church of the Highlands," sold its Chattanooga property, and moved to a smaller facility on land in Harrison, Tennessee that the church had owned since 1946.

In 2014, the church sold Phillips Memorial Chapel, Chauncey-Goode Auditorium, Asbury Chapel, the main auditorium, and three other buildings to Redemption to the Nations, the parent organization of Redemption Point Church, a Church of God congregation based in Ooltewah.

== Fire ==
On the evening of June 10, 2022, Phillips Memorial Chapel and Chauncey-Goode Auditorium caught fire. Over 100 firefighters, from 21 of the city's 26 fire companies, were engaged in fighting the major fire, which continued for more than ten hours overnight before it was extinguished. Residents living within five blocks were asked to shelter in place during the fire to avoid exposure to smoke hazards. Large portions of the buildings were demolished in responding to the fire. The clock tower of Phillips Chapel and one wall with stained glass windows were still standing in the aftermath of the blaze, but it was not immediately known whether they could be preserved. In September, a bishop of the Redemption to the Nations Church, the current owner of the former Highland Park Church property, announced that "the bell tower we intended to keep has been deemed unsafe and unusable for future purposes" and would not be preserved. The auditorium built in 1981 did not burn.

A few days after the fire, investigators reported that they had determined that the fire had been intentionally set. They circulated surveillance photos of a man riding a bicycle in the area at the time of the fire who was being sought as a person of interest in their arson investigation.
