= Suzhou North America High School =

Location
- Suzhou; China

Information
- Type: North American school
- Opened: 2013

Suzhou North America High School (SNA; simplified Chinese: 苏州北美国际高级中学; traditional Chinese: 蘇州北美國際高級中學; pinyin: Sūzhōu Běiměi Guójì Gāojízhōngxué) is an American curriculum international school in Wuzhong District, Suzhou, China.

North Carolina State University and the Suzhou Wuzhong Group cofounded the school, which was scheduled to open in September 2013. The school accepts Chinese citizens and non-Chinese citizens.
