= Bicentennial Capitol Mall State Park =

Urban state park in Nashville, Tennessee, US

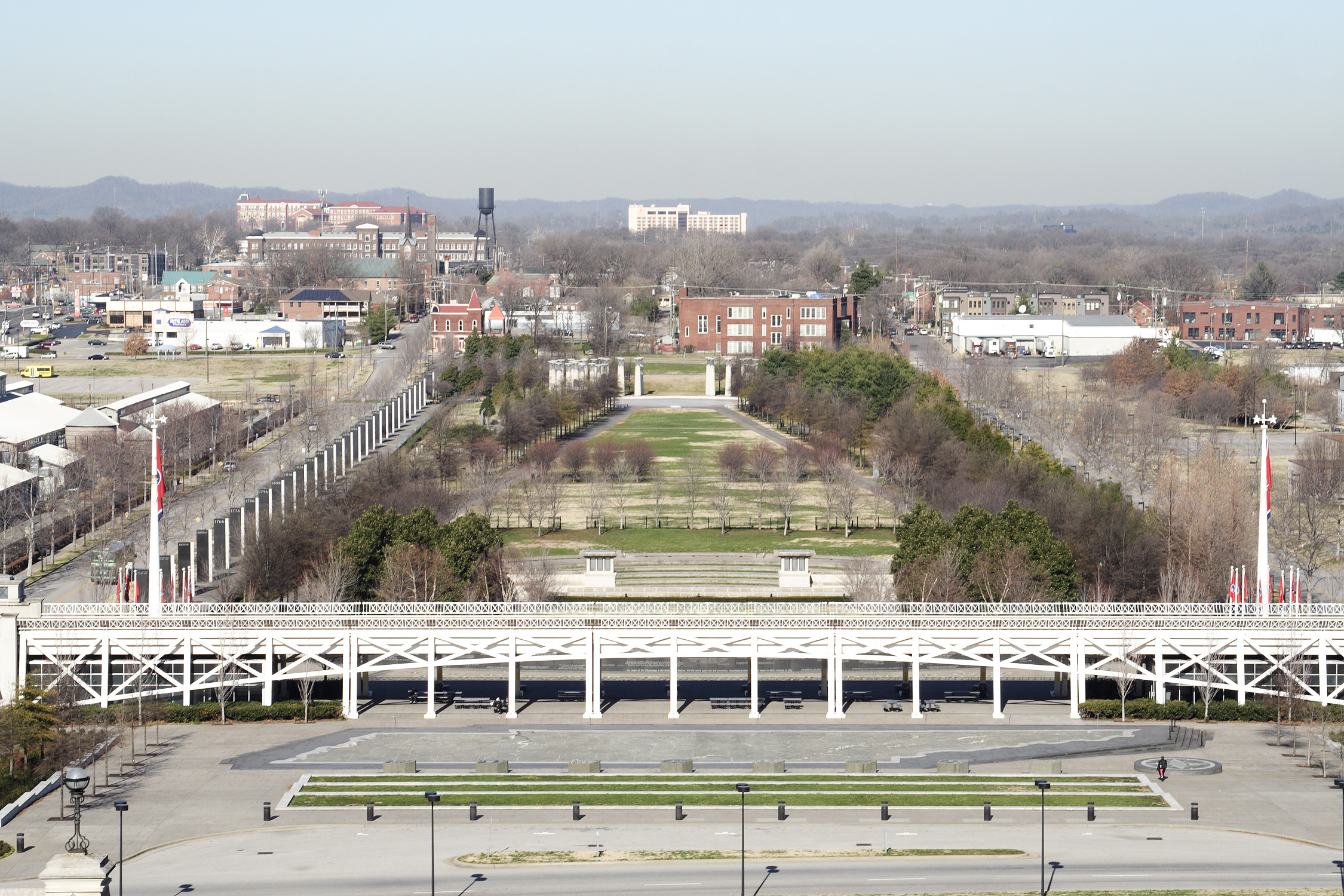
- View of the park from the Tennessee State Capitol
- Interactive map of Bicentennial Capitol Mall State Park
- Type: State park, urban park
- Location: 600 James Robertson Parkway; Nashville, Tennessee, United States
- Coordinates: 36°10′16″N 86°47′16″W
- Area: 19 acres (77,000 m^{2})
- Opened: June 1, 1996; 30 years ago
- Operator: Tennessee Department of Environment and Conservation
- Open: Year round
- Website: Bicentennial Capitol Mall State Park

Bicentennial Capitol Mall State Park, commonly known as Bicentennial Mall, is a linear park in downtown Nashville, Tennessee, United States. The park is located on 19 acres (7.7 ha) north-northwest of the Tennessee State Capitol, and is considered an extension of the capitol grounds. It is modeled on the National Mall in Washington, D.C., and incorporates Classical Greek, Baroque, and Beaux-Arts architecture. It functions as an outdoor museum that uses symbolism to showcase the history, geography, culture, and musical heritage of Tennessee through a series of monuments, walkways, and interpretive displays. It is also landscaped with plants that are native to Tennessee. Receiving more than 2.5 million visitors annually, it is the most visited of the 65 state parks in Tennessee, and one of the most visited public spaces in Nashville.

French Lick Creek passes through the site of the mall, which contained springs that attracted game wildlife and was an important hunting ground for Native Americans. These springs were later utilized by the first European explorers and settlers to the area in the 18th century. The site was prone to flooding from the nearby Cumberland River, and was not permanently settled until the arrival of German immigrants in the 1830s. When Nashville became the permanent state capital, the capitol building was constructed on the hill south of the site. French Lick Creek became contaminated with garbage and raw sewage, and was later channelized and buried in a brick sewer tunnel. The area fell into disrepair in the early 20th century, and many structures on and around the site were subsequently demolished as part of a large-scale urban renewal project funded by the Housing Act of 1949.

Beginning in the mid-20th century, several tall buildings were constructed around the capitol, and some people began advocating for preserving the view from the capitol to the north. A large office complex was initially planned for the site to accommodate the enlarged Tennessee government. Plans subsequently shifted to construct a linear park for the state of Tennessee's bicentennial commemoration, although initially this plan faced skepticism from state planners. The park was designed by Tuck Hinton Architects in 1992 and 1993, and required coordination with several state agencies. Groundbreaking occurred on June 27, 1994, and the park was dedicated on June 1, 1996, the 200th anniversary of Tennessee's statehood. Additional features planned for the park, including a carillon and a walkway recognizing donors, were initially delayed due to funding constraints, but were added in succeeding years. The park struggled with maintenance difficulties and underuse in its early years. Since then, it has been recognized as a cultural and historical landmark. In 2018, the Tennessee State Museum moved to the northwest corner of the park, followed in 2021 by the Tennessee State Library and Archives, which moved to the northeast corner of the park. The incorporation of these entities into the mall complex fulfilled design concepts that were first envisioned during the initial planning of the park.

== Description ==
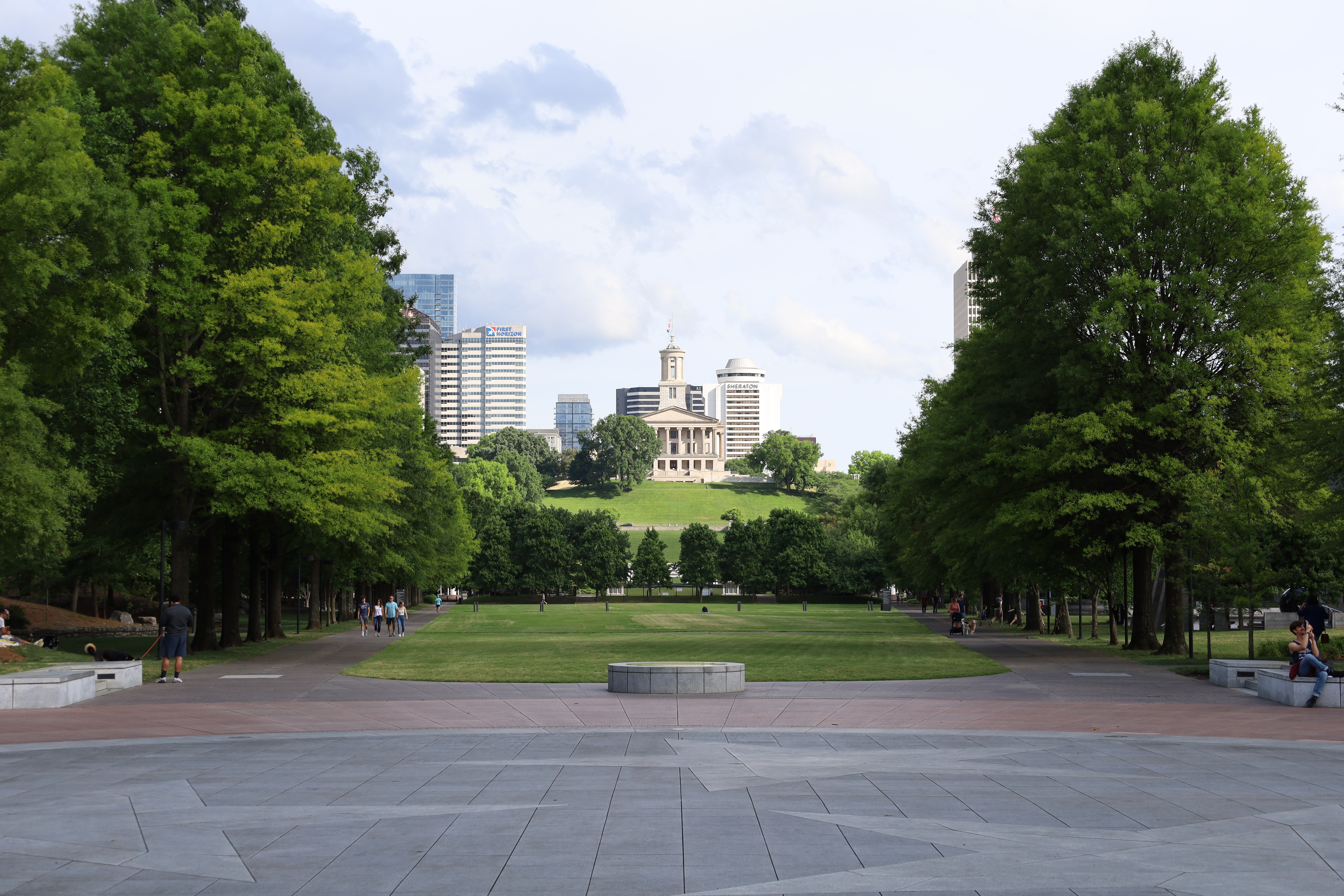
Bicentennial Capitol Mall State Park provides views of the Tennessee State Capitol.

Bicentennial Capitol Mall State Park is managed by the Bureau of Conservation division of the Tennessee Department of Environment and Conservation, along with all of Tennessee's 65 state parks. Since 1998, the State Capitol Commission has been in charge of monuments and memorials at the park. The 19-acre (77,000 m^{2}) park is the smallest state park in Tennessee. Modeled on the National Mall in Washington, D.C., the landscaped park features design elements and symbols that provide visitors with information on Tennessee's history, natural features, attractions, landmarks, and musical heritage. The park's architects' stated theme was "the land, the people, and the music of Tennessee". It incorporates a number of Classical Greek, Baroque, and Beaux-Arts influences. The mall is bordered by Jefferson Street and the Germantown Historic District on the north, James Robertson Parkway on the south, 6th Avenue North on the east, and 7th Avenue North on the west. On-street parking is provided along 6th and 7th Avenues for visitors to the mall and other nearby locations, and the entire park is easily accessible by foot or bike. It is situated directly north-northwest of the hill that contains the Tennessee State Capitol, which is located across James Robertson Parkway and is distinctly visible from the park. It is considered an extension of the capitol grounds, and designed to integrate seamlessly into the surrounding cityscape. The Nashville Farmers' Market is to the park's immediate west. The Tennessee State Museum is located directly west of the park's north end, and the Tennessee State Library and Archives is east of the north end. Multiple state office buildings are also located nearby. Both sides of the mall are lined with tulip poplars, Tennessee's state tree, and all trees and shrubs in the park are native to Tennessee.

=== Tennessee Plaza and railroad trestle ===
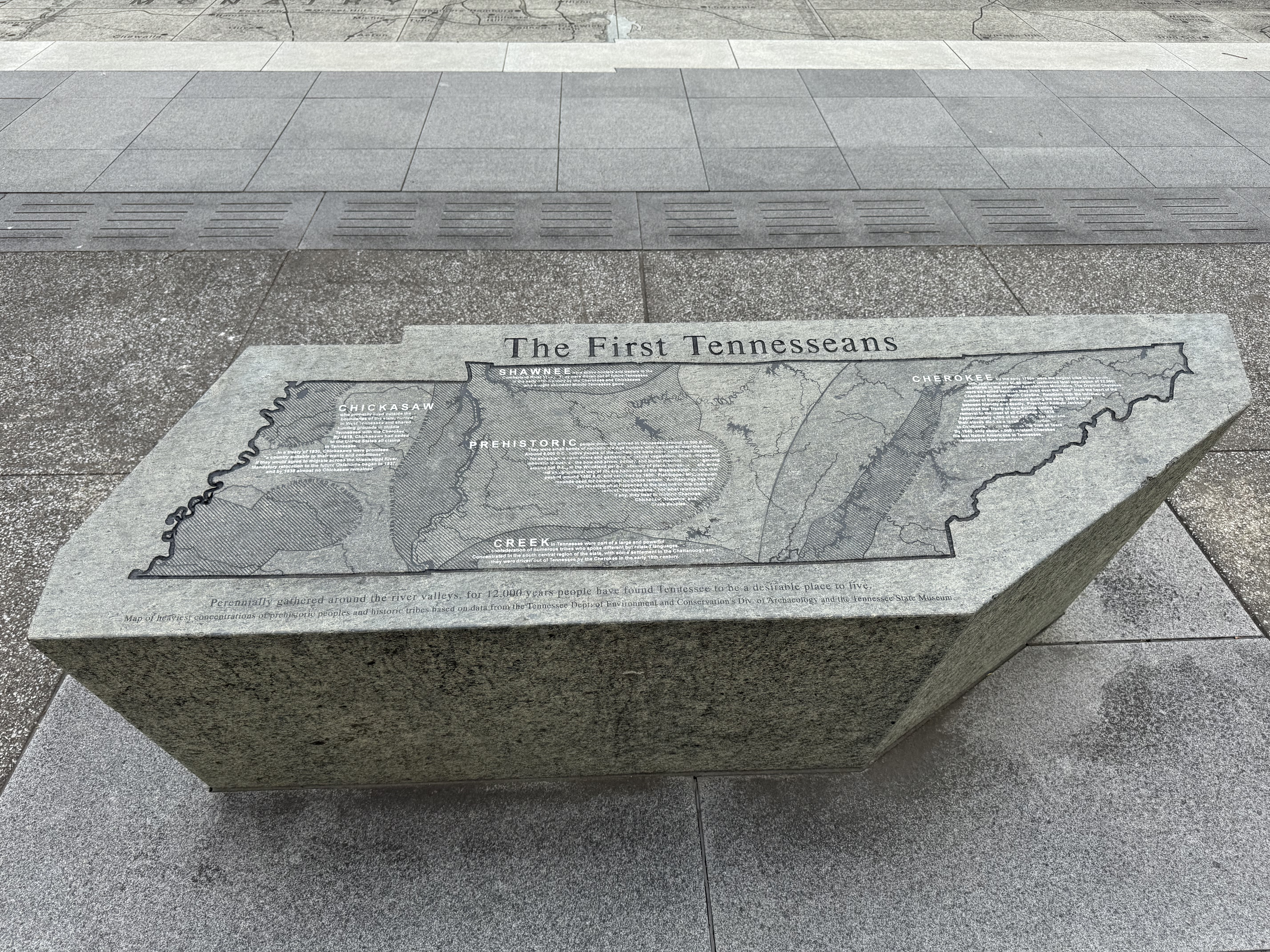
One of eight smaller maps at the Tennessee Map Plaza. This map chronicles the state's Native American inhabitants.

On the southern end of the mall is the Tennessee Plaza, the defining feature of which is the Tennessee Map Plaza. This is a 200-by-50-foot (60 by 20 m) wide green granite map of the state that showcases its cities, counties, rivers, major highways, and railroads. Pigmentation is used to script city and county names, and Interstate Highways are indicated in gold pinstripes. The stone surface is polished to highlight rivers, which is intended to produce a shimmering appearance of waterways similar to what is observed from aircraft. The map is slightly tilted to improve visibility from Capitol Hill. Each county seat contains a flush-mounted light which turns on at night. Eight smaller elevated granite maps arranged below the map plaza illustrate the state's geology, original inhabitants, territory, transportation, land cover, recreational opportunities, musical heritage, and topography. One of these maps is a depiction of a map of Tennessee produced in 1795. Directly east of the map is a large compass rose that indicates its orientation. South of the map is the Zero Milestone marker, which contains the "T-Dot", a nod to the Tennessee Department of Transportation. Three grass terraces that gently slope downward are located between the map plaza and James Robertson Parkway.

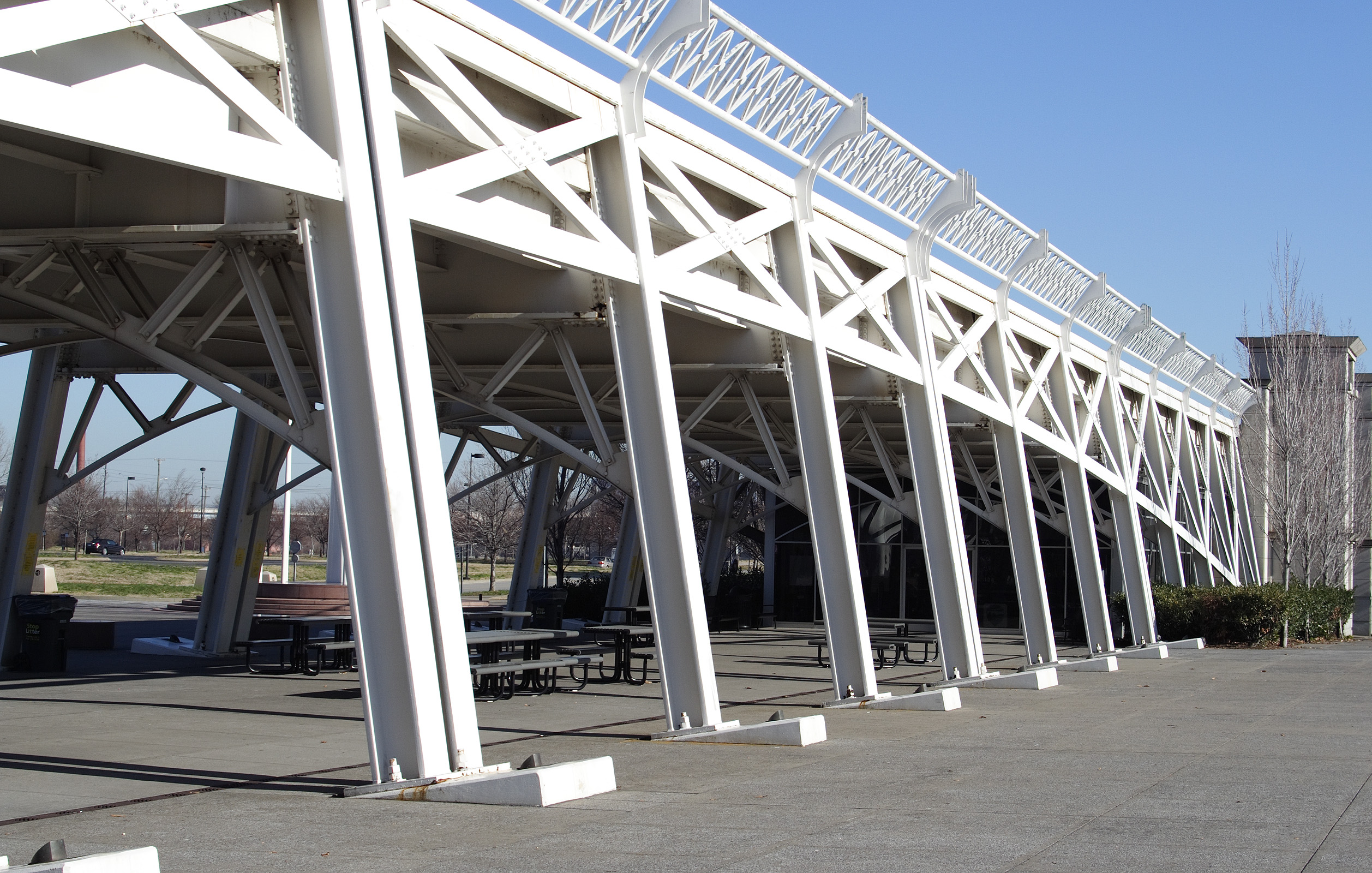
A CSX railroad crosses the park on a steel trestle.

A 300-foot-long (91 m) steel railroad trestle crosses the park directly south of the map plaza; it carries a mainline railroad operated by CSX Transportation. At each end of the trestle are limestone bridges that cross 6th and 7th Avenue, respectively. These bridges utilize the Greek Revival architectural style of the Tennessee State Capitol, and on each side are inscribed with "1796" and "1996" on the left and right abutments, respectively. The trestle is painted white to reflect light onto the area beneath and complement the surrounding aesthetics. The columns extend slightly outward from top to bottom to correspond with a previous wooden trestle that once occupied the site. The park's visitor center, restrooms, and several picnic tables are located underneath the trestle. Near each end of the trestle to the south flies a 12-by-18-foot (3.7 by 5.5 m) Tennessee Flag, each of which is surrounded by eight 5-by-8-foot (1.5 by 2.4 m) Tennessee Flags. The large flags commemorate the state's bicentennial celebration, and the small flags represent Tennessee's status as the 16th state admitted to the Union. The placement of the flags was inspired by the work of André Le Nôtre at the Palace of Versailles.

=== Rivers of Tennessee and Tennessee Amphitheater ===
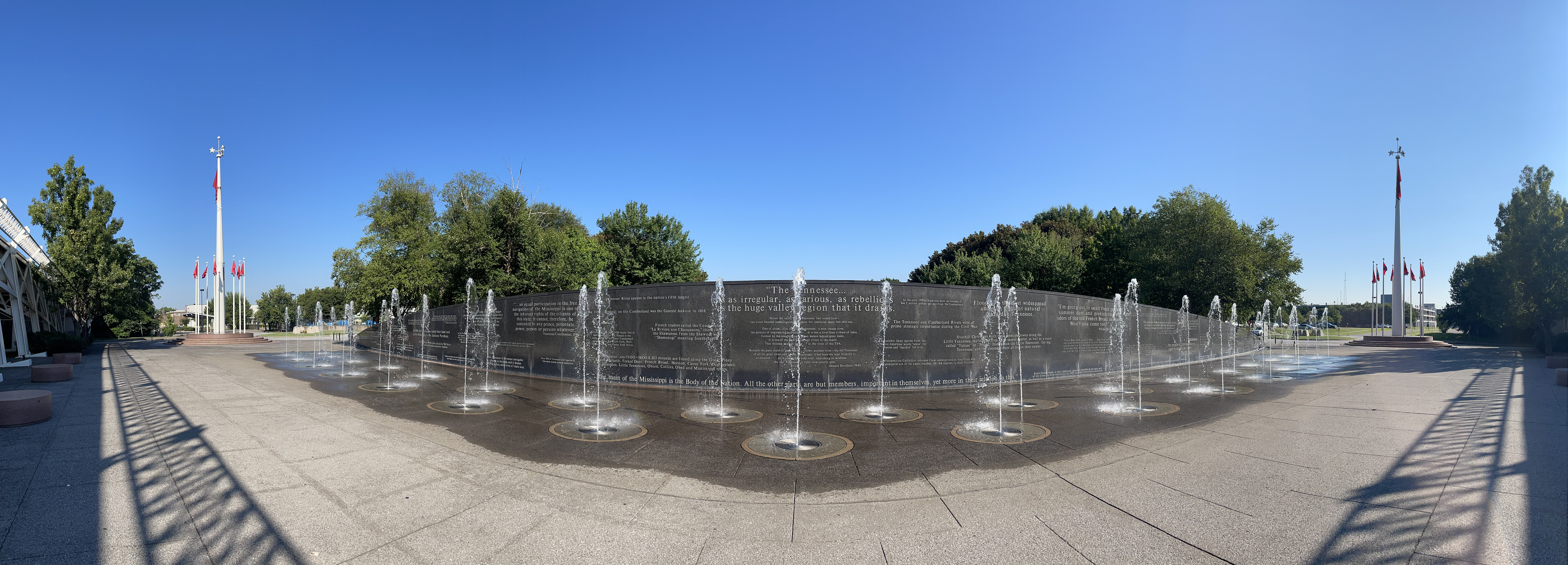
A panoramic view of the Rivers of Tennessee Fountains and wall

Directly north of the railroad is the Rivers of Tennessee Fountains, 31 geyser-like fountains representing each of the major rivers and waterways of Tennessee, which has the fifth-largest river system in the United States. These fountains, which together function as a splash pad, spray columns of water to various heights, and are lit by color-changing lights at night. Behind the fountains is a curved wall called the Rivers of Tennessee Wall that contains information in the form of facts, quotes, famous sayings, phrases, and poetry about the state's waterways and their role in its history. The shape of the wall also alludes to Tennessee's nickname of the "Big Bend State", which comes from the Tennessee River's path across the state. A ramp is located on the backside of the wall, which contains engraved statements about the history of the railroad and the mall site at its highest point. Water from the fountains flows into a large trough at the base of the wall that represents the Mississippi River, which forms the western border of Tennessee and drains almost the entirety of the state. Harrison Street crosses the park immediately behind the wall.

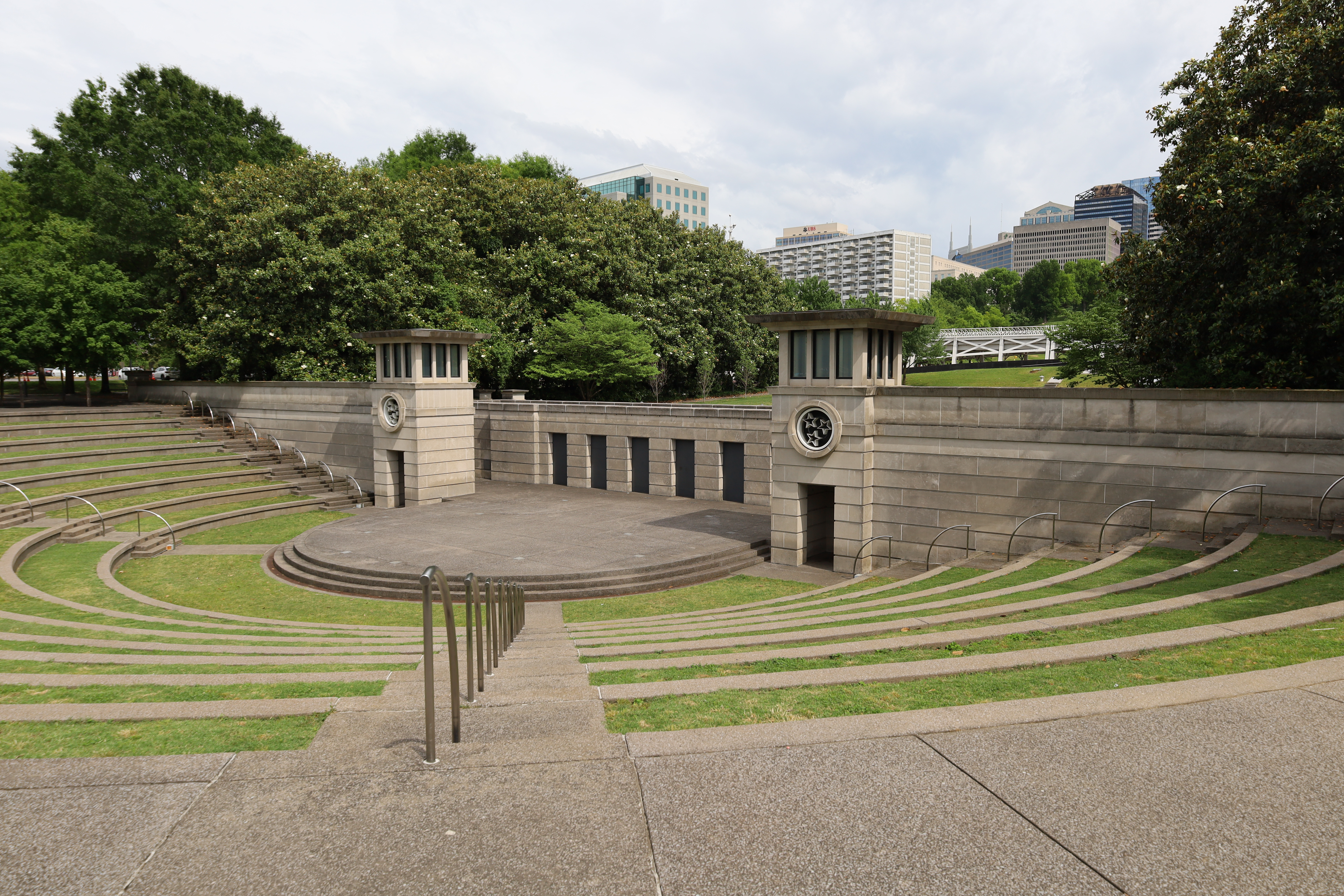
The Tennessee Amphitheater

The Tennessee Amphitheater is a 2,200-seat terraced amphitheater north of the river displays, which is used for special events. This semi-circular theater in an artificial depression is patterned off of the Ancient Theatre of Epidaurus and the Roman Theatre of Orange. The design of the theater also honors the Greco-Roman architectural inspiration for the Tennessee State Capitol by architect William Strickland. The seating consists of seven-foot-wide (2.1 m) stepped lawns. The stage is flanked by dual towers that resemble large lanterns. Each of these towers is topped by an overhanging cornice, with lightly frosted windows below. Directly below this are open stainless steel replicas of the tri-star logo from the state flag that serve as openings for speakers behind. The location of the amphitheater below grade combined with surrounding shade trees were intended to improve acoustics and reduce surrounding urban noise. A central lawn extends between the amphitheater and the Court of Three Stars at the north end of the park. This lawn is modeled on the open spaces of the National Mall in Washington, D.C., and is designed to be used for various activities. The lawn is crossed by two pathways, one of which follows the original alignment of Jackson Street. An elevated circular granite monument commonly referred to as the "button" is located at the north end of the lawn. This monument is inscribed with names of the creators and sponsors of the mall, and also recognizes Governors Ned McWherter (1987–1995) and Don Sundquist (1995–2003), who oversaw the park's construction.

=== Court of Three Stars and carillon ===
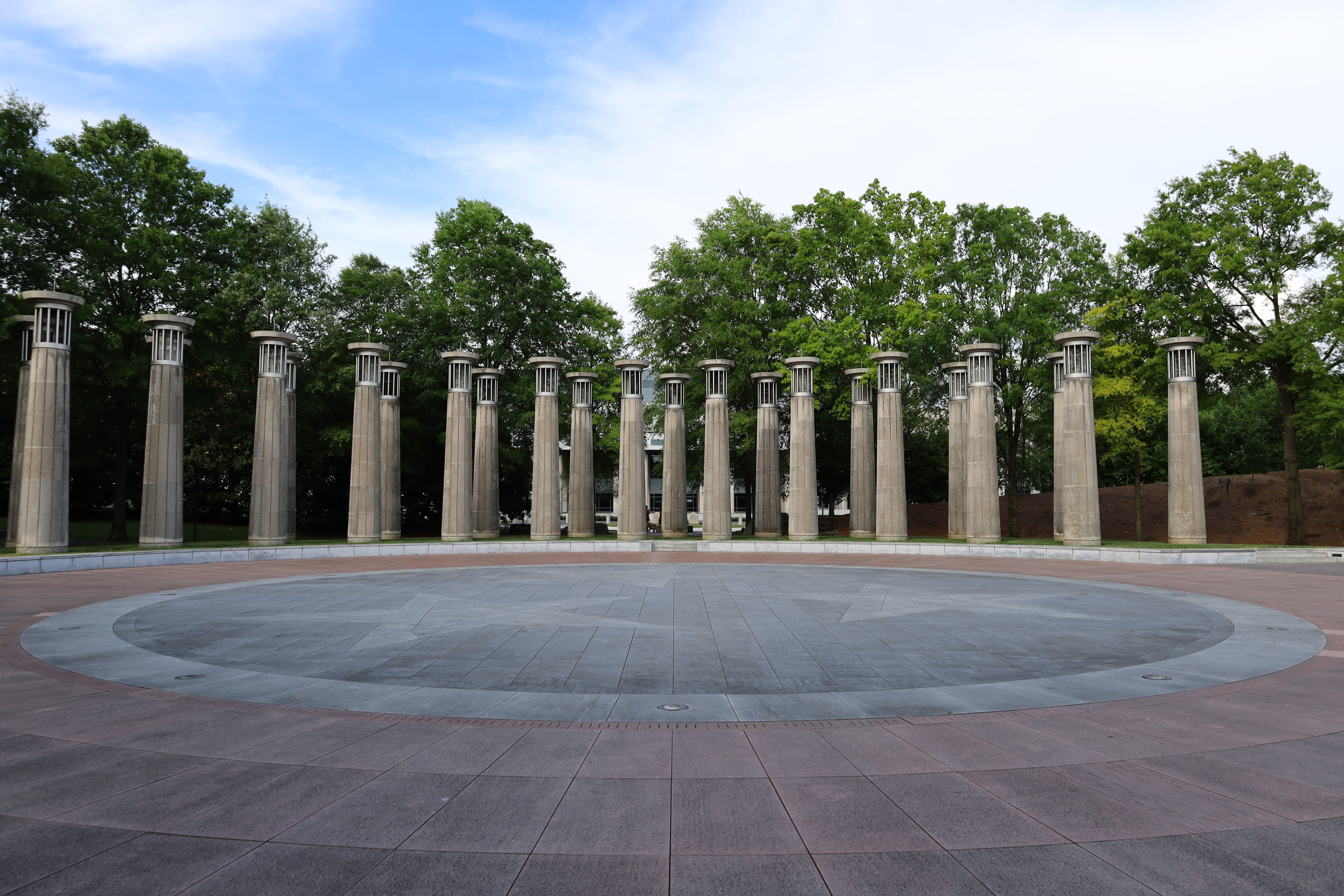
The Court of Three Stars and carillon pillars

The Court of Three Stars is a circular plaza made of red, white, and blue granite arranged into a large replica of the tri-star logo found on the state flag. These stars represent the three Grand Divisions of Tennessee, which are geographical, cultural, and economic divisions that are defined in state law.

Surrounding the plaza are 50 columns containing a 95-bell carillon, representing the 95 counties of Tennessee and the state's contribution to the development of American popular music. The placement of the columns is designed to provide a unique surround-sound experience for patrons walking through the court. The carillon plays an arrangement of the "Tennessee Waltz" each hour, followed by a chiming of the time of day by the largest bell in middle C. It also plays portions of other important state songs, including "Ol' Man River", "Chattanooga Choo Choo", "On Top of Old Smokey", and "Rocky Top" throughout the day. The carillon is operated by a computer in a small pavilion nearby, with a console and pianist keyboard for guest performers. A narrow path that encircles the Court of Three Stars next to the carillon is inscribed with names of prominent musicians from Tennessee, with space reserved for future additions. An unnamed road curves around the Court of Three Stars between Jefferson Street; two paths connect the court to the northern corners of the park. A 96th bell called the Answer Bell is housed in a tower on Capitol Hill and joins in with the carillon at the top of each hour; the bell is meant to represent the government's commitment to the people. The stainless steel structure that houses this bell was inspired by the Choragic Monument of Lysicrates and the Tower of the Winds. On each face of the octagonal granite base are inscriptions of female angels, or "musicks", that represent the major genres of music of Tennessee. This was designed by artist Paul Harmon, who took inspiration from the angelic figures on the Tower of the Winds.

=== Walkways ===
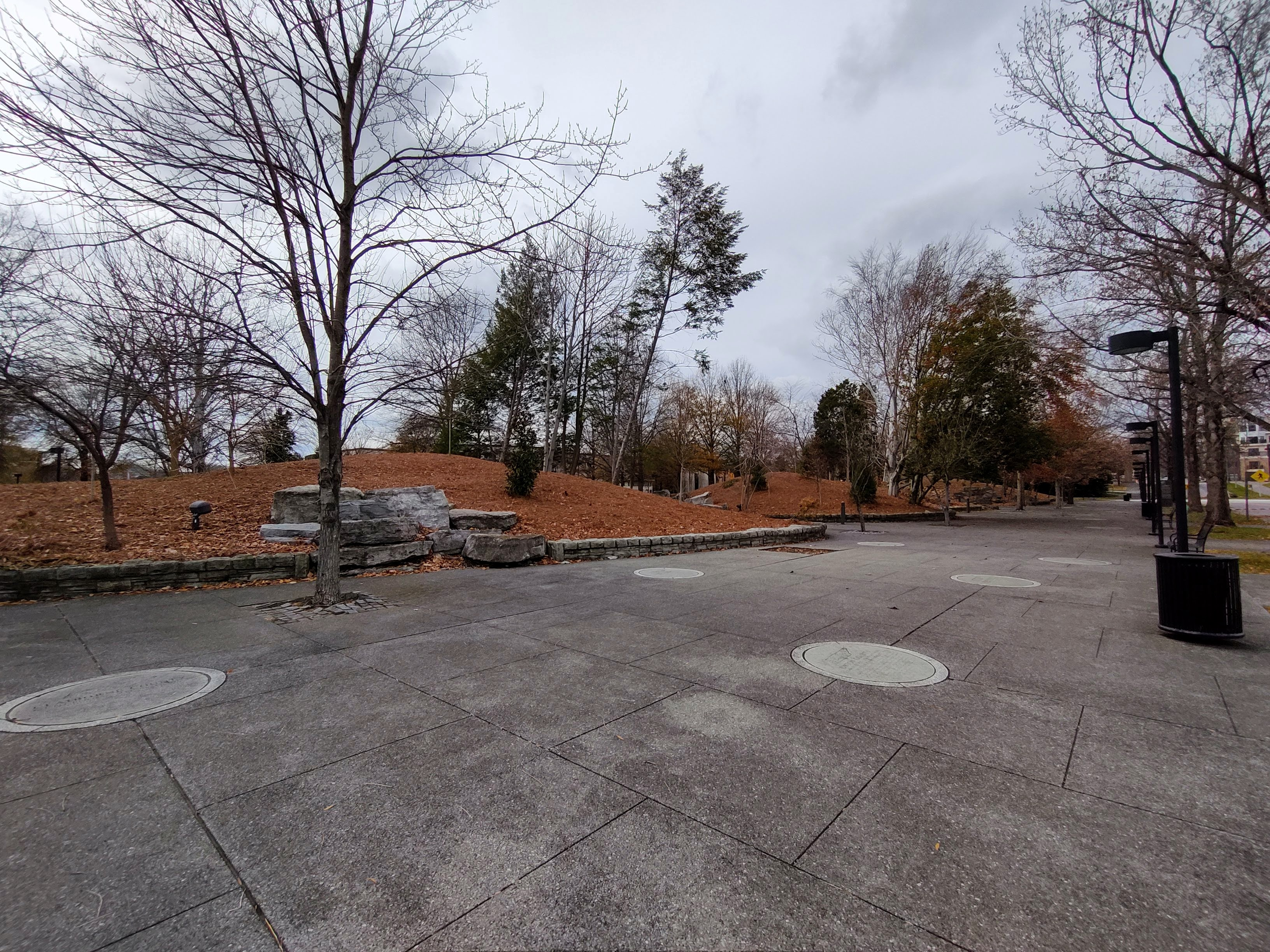
The East Tennessee portion of the Walkway of the Counties. The mounds and rocks in the background represent the region's mountainous terrain.

The central lawn is surrounded by four main walking paths and several memorials. The two inner walkways make up the Pathway of Volunteers, which alludes to Tennessee's nickname "The Volunteer State". Tennessee first earned this nickname during the War of 1812, and it was further solidified during the Texas Revolution and Mexican–American War. Each pathway is 1,400 feet (430 m) long, and was built with 17,000 pavers inscribed with the names of individuals and organizations that provided donations for the park's construction. The walkways gradually converge towards each other from south to north, almost touching at the button monument and Court of Three Stars. The south end of the Pathway of Volunteers contains both of the Governor's Time Capsules, which were buried during the park's groundbreaking and opening, respectively. They will be opened on June 27, 2094, and on Tennessee's tricentennial, June 1, 2096, respectively. In addition to recognizing the governors, these time capsules are covered by stones that also honor the members of the respective state legislatures and cabinets at the time. Journalist Keel Hunt argues that the two walkways and their near-convergence have come to represent the bipartisanship that existed in the Tennessee legislature in the late 20th century. McWherter, a Democrat, and Sundquist, a Republican, both oversaw the mall's construction, despite partisan differences and disagreements about the park.

The eastern outer path is the Walkway of the Counties, which runs adjacent to 6th Avenue and represents Tennessee's diverse geography from west to east. Throughout the walkway are time capsules from each county, arranged from south to north by Grand Division, which will be opened on the state's tricentennial on June 1, 2096. The lids of each capsule contain brief descriptions of their respective county. The walkway, which ranges from 12 to 20 feet (3.7 to 6.1 m) wide, also demarcates the boundaries between the Grand Divisions. The planters next to the walkway exhibit the state's diverse topographical landforms and feature flora from across the state's respective regions. The West Tennessee planters are at ground level, representative of the region's flat and swampy terrain. The low stone walls along the planters that represent the eastern portion of the state are made of Tennessee Quartzite, and the rocks in the planters symbolize rock outcroppings found in Middle and East Tennessee. The East Tennessee planters contain mounds representative of the region's mountains, some of which are among the highest in eastern North America. Accompanying the planters are granite obelisks which provide descriptions of the state's nine physiographic regions and detail their geology and vegetation. An obelisk detailing the history of the Tennessee State Capitol is also located along this walkway. Fragments from the original columns of the state capitol building are located along the midpoint of the walkway, representing the struggle to construct the statehouse and preserve it. These are part of the Charles Warterfield Reliquary, named for one of the park's architects.

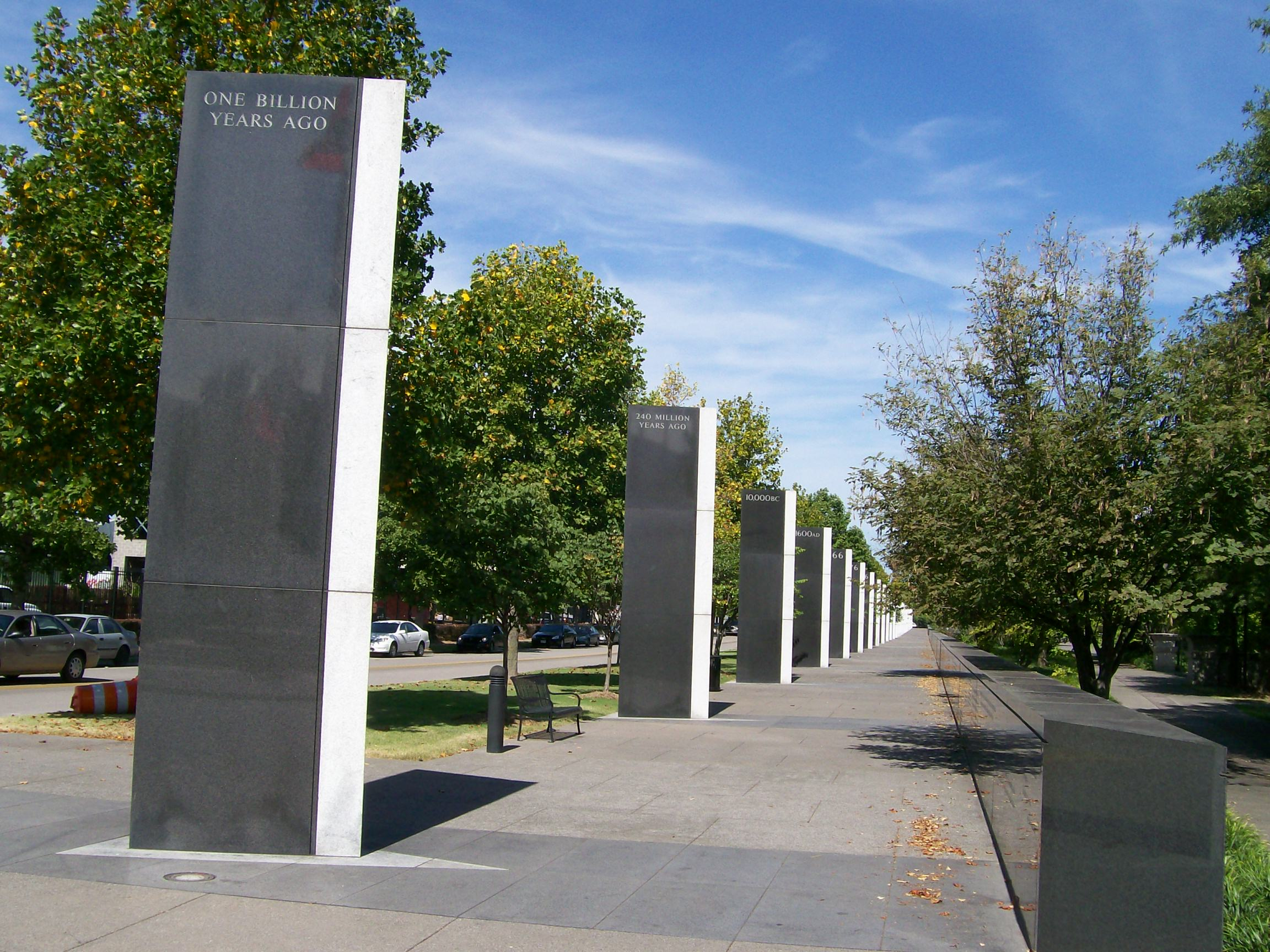
Beginning of the Pathway of History

The western outer path along 7th Avenue is the Pathway of History, containing a 1,400-foot (430 m) series of four-foot-tall (1.2 m) walls on the east side, which chronicle major events in the state's history with short inscriptions. This pathway is divided into two main sections: a shorter section which provides a brief overview of Tennessee's prehistory and precolonial history, beginning one billion years ago, and a longer one which provides a more detailed history of the state from 1766 to 1996. A series of cracks and shifts in the wall symbolizes the political division among Tennesseans during the American Civil War. On the west side of the pathway next to the road, each decade from 1766 to 1996 is represented by a large granite pylon in 50-foot (15 m) increments; these are also provided for the precolonial section, which read "One Billion Years Ago", "240 Million Years Ago", "10,000 BC", and "1600 AD", respectively. These were inspired by the monoliths from 2001: A Space Odyssey and unbuilt pylons designed for Freedom Plaza in Washington D.C. by Robert Venturi. The walkway is named the Andrea Conte Pedestrian Walkway after Andrea Conte, the First Lady of Tennessee from 2003 to 2011.

=== Monuments and memorials ===
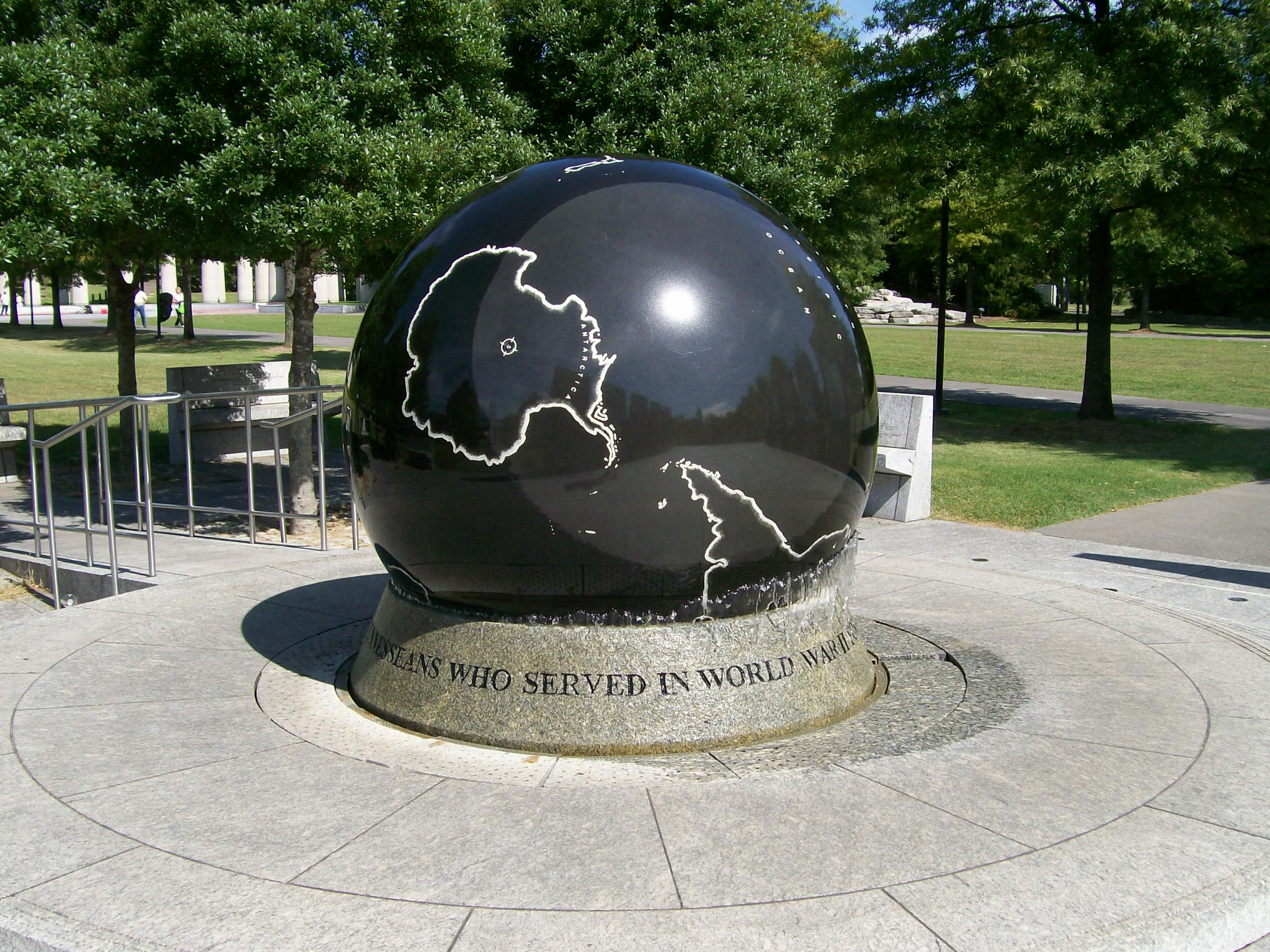
Globe at the World War II Memorial

A number of monuments and memorials are located adjacent to the Pathway of History. The Statehood Memorial is located approximately 20 ft (6.1 m) on top of the approximate location of McNairy Spring, a hydrological sulfur spring that was used by settlers and residents of the area as a main source of water in the 18th and 19th centuries. This monument consists of a fountain representing the spring surrounded by a circular wall which contains sixteen stars. The Centennial Memorial commemorates the Tennessee Centennial and International Exposition of 1897. There is also a monument to Tennesseans who served in the Civilian Conservation Corps.

The World War II Memorial features a rectangular plaza that contains ten pillars etched with images and descriptions of the war relevant to Tennessee. The pillars on the east represent events from the European and Mediterranean and Middle Eastern theaters, and the western pillars represent events from the Pacific Theater. The memorial also contains a 18,000 lb (8,200 kg) movable granite globe suspended by water that was fabricated in Germany and maps the world of the 1940s. The globe contains lines mapping Tennessee to the sites of major battles. A bench with the names of the seven recipients of the Medal of Honor from Tennessee is located on the south edge of the memorial. On the north end of the monument, stone seats recognize the sponsors of the memorial. The surface of the plaza contains gold stars honoring the 5,731 Tennesseans who died during the war. A time capsule on the plaza will be opened on November 11, 2045. A small monument that commemorates the state's role and struggles during the civil rights movement, particularly the Nashville sit-ins, consists of four granite stools; two black and two white. A quote from Knoxville minister Merrill Proudfoot is inscribed on the ground below.

== History ==
=== Site history ===
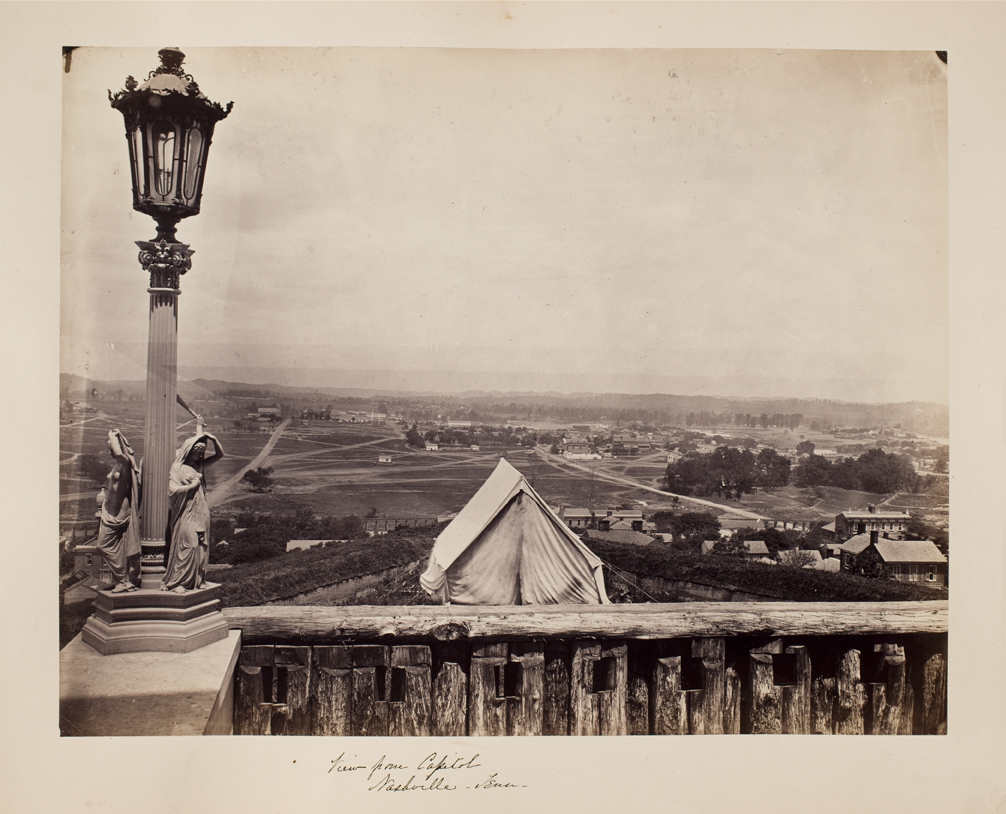
View from the Tennessee State Capitol in 1865 showing undeveloped floodplains to the north

Lick Branch, later known as French Lick Creek, was a stream that flowed through the present-day southern portion of Bicentennial Capitol Mall State Park. It contained numerous salt licks and springs along its banks, including the McNairy Spring. Herds of bison, as well as deer, turkeys, bears, and other game wildlife were attracted to this stream, and Native American peoples including Cherokee, Chickasaw, and Shawnee made use of animal trails in the area. Due to constant territorial disputes, the area was held by no single Native American group when European settlers first arrived. French traders under the command of Charles Charleville established a trading post near the site in 1714, which was the first European settlement in what is now Nashville and became known as French Lick. The French Lick Creek and spring attracted settlers from East Tennessee to the region in 1779, who established Fort Nashborough, the namesake of Nashville, along the Cumberland River, and founded the Cumberland Association the following year. The spring continued to be used as one of the city's primary water sources throughout the 19th century, and the area gradually became known as Sulphur Bottoms after another nearby spring. The arrival of the railroads in the 1850s positioned Nashville as a transportation hub.

After Tennessee statehood in 1796, the area occupied by Bicentennial Mall remained undeveloped until the mid-1830s, when skilled German immigrants began to settle south of French Lick Creek. This neighborhood, which was later renamed Germantown, contained butcher shops, packing houses, and agricultural operations. French Lick Creek separated this community from other communities to the north, and the low-lying areas along the creek were prone to frequent flooding by the Cumberland River. In 1843, the Tennessee General Assembly declared Nashville as the permanent state capital, and the hill to the south of the site known as Campbell's Hill and formerly Cedar Knob was chosen as the site for the state capitol building. Construction began in 1845 and was completed in 1859. During the American Civil War, Tennessee became the last state to join the Confederacy, and was briefly regarded as a border state. Nashville was the first Confederate state capital to fall, which was made possible by the Confederate defeat at the Battle of Fort Donelson. The Union seized control of the undefended city on February 25, 1862, and thousands of troops quickly poured into the city, establishing camps on Capitol Hill and the surrounding lowlands.

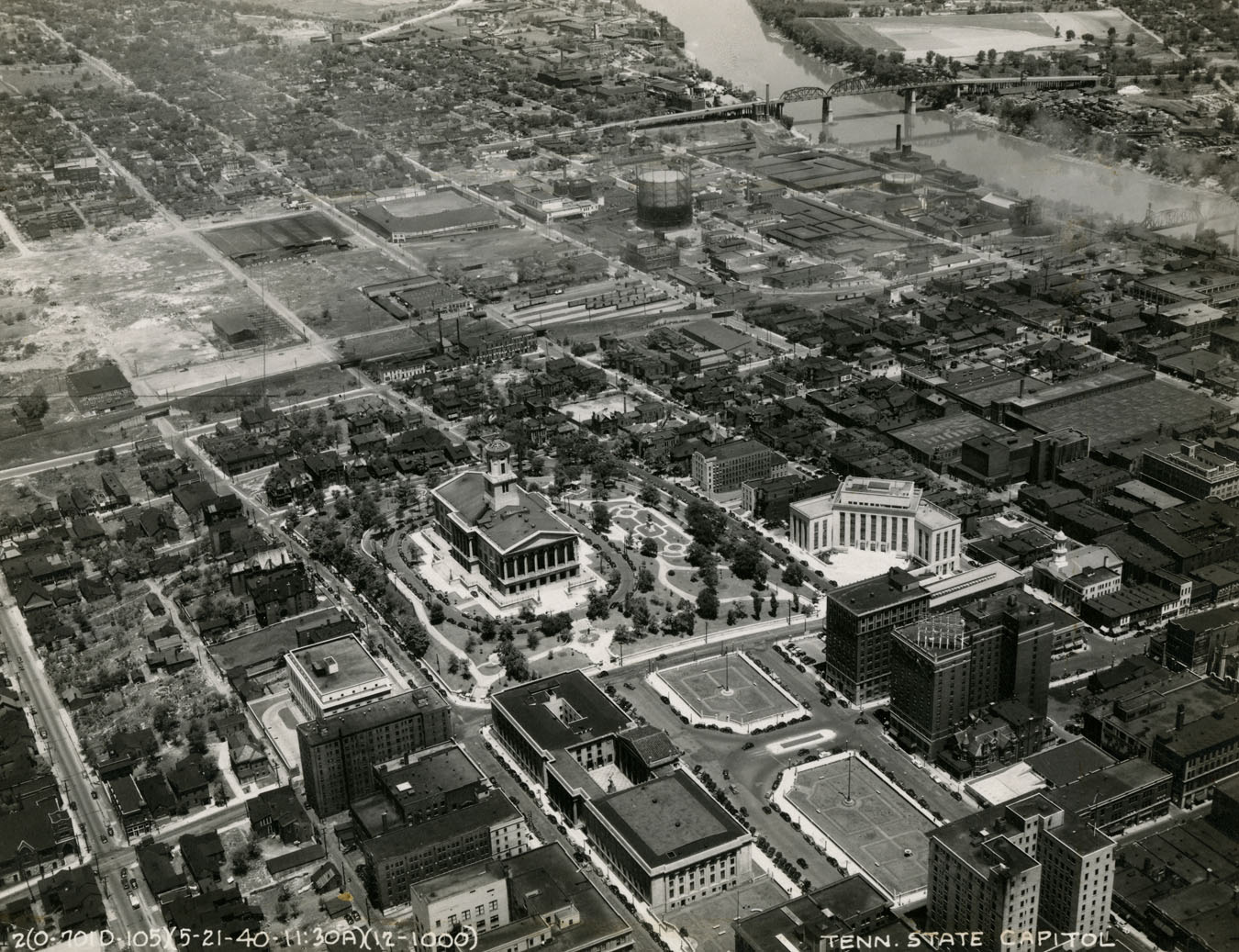
An aerial view of downtown Nashville in 1942, with the Tennessee State Capitol and the site of Bicentennial Mall to the north. Much of the land surrounding the capitol had become rundown by this time.

As Nashville grew and prospered during the Reconstruction era, more residences and businesses occupied the site. French Lick Creek became contaminated with garbage and raw sewage, and was credited with exacerbating a cholera epidemic in 1873, which killed more than 1,000 people and led to public outcry over the poor state of the city's sanitation infrastructure. Between the 1880s and the 1950s, part of the site that was prone to flooding was used as a dump, with many relics from this period found during construction. The stream was channelized in 1889, and buried three years later in a brick sewer tunnel 25 feet (7.6 m) below the ground. Once this was complete, an artificial fill was constructed in the area to flatten the grade and raise it above the flood level.

Beginning in the early 20th century, the area fell into disrepair and became a red light district. A number of industries developed in this area including laundries, coal yards, gas works, stock yards, and feed companies, and anti-German sentiment after World War I led many original landowners to move away. By the 1940s, many of the structures on the site were declared substandard, and the neighborhood to the west was in such poor shape that it became known as Hell's Half Acre. Many of the structures on and around the site were subsequently demolished as part of a large-scale urban renewal project initiated in 1950 that was funded by the Housing Act of 1949. As part of this project, a new thoroughfare – the James Robertson Parkway – was constructed north of the capitol. The Nashville Farmers Market relocated to the north end of the site on Jefferson Street in 1954.

=== Early concepts ===
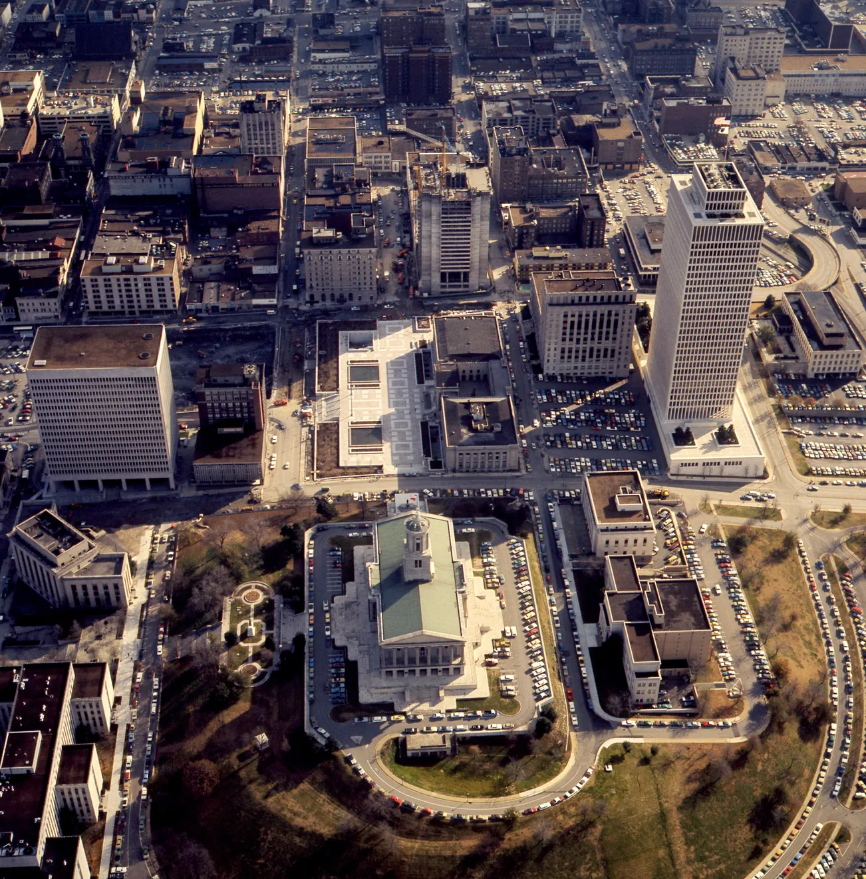
An aerial view of downtown Nashville in 1974, with the capitol in the foreground. A construction boom in the latter 20th century led to surrounding skyscrapers, which obstructed the view from the capitol.

Starting in the mid-20th century, a building boom resulted in several skyscrapers being constructed around the capitol building. The view to the north, however, remained unobstructed, partly due to the historically swampy lands that were less suitable for high-rise construction, and some people began to advocate for preserving this. The area north of the capitol between James Robertson Parkway and Jefferson Street also continued to deteriorate, despite the urban renewal project; this was exacerbated by the closure of the Sulphur Dell ballpark in 1963. In 1969, Knoxville architect Robert Church proposed a multi-level parking garage along the north and west sides of Capitol Hill. As part of this plan, Church reportedly discussed the possibility of extending the greenery of Capitol Hill north of James Robertson Parkway with state architect Clayton Dekle. The state began gradually acquiring much of the land north of the capitol in the early 1970s with the intent of eventually constructing a large office complex, necessitated by the growth of the state government. In 1985, Gresham, Smith and Partners prepared a preliminary land-use master plan for development of the land north of the capitol, and Nashville landscape architect Joe Hodgson assisted planning for a new state office park that included a linear public park.

In 1988, John Bridges of Nashville-based Aladdin Industries conceived the idea for a public park on the site modeled on the National Mall in Washington, D.C. Bridges recalled an unobstructed view of the capitol from the old Elliott School building on the north side of Jefferson Street, and recognized that the opportunity to preserve this would likely be lost as Nashville grew and construction technologies advanced. He shared a sketch and brief narrative of his idea with Aladdin's CEO Victor S. Johnson Jr., who contacted Governor Ned McWherter the following year and presented him with Bridges' idea. McWherter then presented the plans to James E. Hall, the director of the Tennessee State Planning Office, who had already begun studying options for celebrating the state's bicentennial in 1996. McWherter was reportedly skeptical about the project when Hall first discussed it with him, calling it "Hall's Mall", but quickly warmed to the idea. Johnson consulted New York architect Robert Lamb Hart, who in 1990 devised a plan that integrated distinct elements along the proposed park's length and incorporated new state office buildings on the south end. That same year, state planning officials began preliminary work on concepts for celebrating and recognizing Tennessee's bicentennial. They quickly began considering the feasibility of a permanent civic gift that would remain long after other bicentennial celebration events.

On July 19, 1989, Governor McWherter first publicly spoke about plans to convert the land north of the capitol into a linear green space modeled on the National Mall for the state's bicentennial. He also suggested that the park could serve as a reconciliation to African Americans in North Nashville, whose neighborhoods on Jefferson Street were decimated by the construction of Interstate 40 in the late 1960s. Tennessee Finance Commissioner David Manning was placed in charge of the project by McWherter. Several derivative plans were proposed for the mall by the state government's staff members, and by the middle of 1991, state officials realized that cluttering Capitol Hill with more office buildings would not be popular. That same year, Hall included the mall in a report on potential bicentennial commemorations and celebrations, although skepticism about the project remained. In September 1991, Assistant Finance Commissioner Jerry Preston assembled a five-member team of architectural professionals to study the feasibility of constructing the mall north of the capitol. This group first toured the site and then evaluated previous proposals. Once this was complete, the group began work on broad concepts for the design. On November 7, 1991, the Metropolitan Nashville Council approved a revitalization plan for downtown Nashville, which included the mall.

=== Planning and construction ===
On June 1, 1992, McWherter signed an executive order creating the Tennessee Bicentennial Commission to oversee the planning of the statewide bicentennial celebration. This 23-member panel, which was composed of prominent business leaders, celebrities, and governmental leaders from around the state, first met on August 12, 1992, where preliminary plans for the mall were presented. On August 27, Tuck Hinton Architects and staff from SSOE Engineers and Ross/Fowler Landscape Architects were hired to develop a master plan for the mall. The team consulted with members of the bicentennial commission and other state officials on how to develop a park that reflected Tennessee's diversity, history, culture, and natural features. They believed that simply establishing a state park would likely fail to sufficiently institute the site as a tourist destination and bicentennial commemoration; architect Kem Hinton stated that the park "had to be a destination itself". The team initially recognized that accessibility between the capitol and park would need to be improved, and recommended removing a state employee parking lot and a portion of Gay Street on the north slope of Capitol Hill.

To improve visibility between the mall and the capitol, a new overlook atop the north slope of Capitol Hill called Belvedere was proposed, with a stairwell connecting to the capitol building from the east side of the overlook. A second set of stairs and ramps would connect the west side of the overlook to James Robertson Parkway, which required demolition of the Capitol Towers apartment building. The plan also called for aesthetic improvements to James Robertson Parkway and the incorporation of the railroad into the park, which was located atop an artificial berm and had proven to be an impediment to the redevelopment of the mall site. The architects recommended replacing the berm with a trestle. They also recognized that in order for the mall to reach Jefferson Street, the farmer's market would need to relocate, and proposed a site adjacent to the mall on Rosa L. Parks Boulevard (then 8th Avenue). The architects hoped that such a site would boost visitation to the park.

In early 1993, state and city officials agreed on the site for the new farmer's market, allowing design work on the mall to begin. Due to funding constraints and the complexity of the project, planners recognized early on that all proposals for the park would likely not materialize by the bicentennial, and that the initial development would likely only contain the public park, farmer's market, and state employee parking. The architects intended the park to be an outdoor museum. In addition to the National Mall, the designers also took inspiration from Freedom Plaza in Washington, D.C. After conducting extensive research about Tennessee, the architects settled on a plan to base the mall around themes of the state's land, people, and music. They also hoped that the park would eventually be lined by state cultural facilities.

Initial concepts for the design of the mall were reported by the local press in March 1993, and the design team reached a consensus for the plan on May 11, 1993. The master plan was presented to Governor McWherter and state officials on May 26, 1993, and unveiled to the public on June 2 during a meeting of the bicentennial commission at Fisk University. Approval was granted by the State Building Commission on July 8, 1993, although they raised concerns about the cost of the project, the necessary materials, and its symbolic meaning. A final review of the project was then approved by the State Capitol Commission on July 23, 1993, and final design work began shortly thereafter. The master plan was divided into five distinct parts: the revitalization of Capitol Hill, the new railroad trestle, road improvements, parking, and the main part of the mall. During this time, all features of the mall were detailed and finalized, and construction plans were prepared. A final roadblock ensued when city officials would not agree to the small roundabouts at 6th and 7th Avenue with Harrison Street. This was resolved when the state agreed to assume control of these roads. In January 1994, the state government purchased the nearby American General Tower, which was later renamed William R. Snodgrass Tennessee Tower. The plans to build state office buildings along the mall were hence abandoned, raising hopes among advocates for the development of other state cultural facilities in the area.

A groundbreaking ceremony for the Bicentennial Mall took place on June 27, 1994, overseen by Governor McWherter, who buried the Governor's Time Capsule. The construction process was coordinated and supervised by Heery International, and was initially expected to cost $23 million. (Note: Equivalent to $44 million in 2024) Initial activities consisted of revisions to the north slope of Capitol Hill and the start of the farmer's market. Work then commenced on the railroad trestle and improvements to the roads in the park. Other preliminary work included demolitions, utility relocations, and parking area construction. In late October 1994, work began on the Tennessee Amphitheater, the first major element of the mall. By that same month, the project had already gone over budget, and engineers began to recommend reductions to the original plan to keep the cost at $41.5 million. (Note: Equivalent to $79.4 million in 2024) This resulted in the carillon being deferred in March 1995. A shallow stream through the Central Lawn was also canceled. The railroad trestle, which was constructed adjacent to the old line and required constant coordination with CSX officials, also proved difficult.

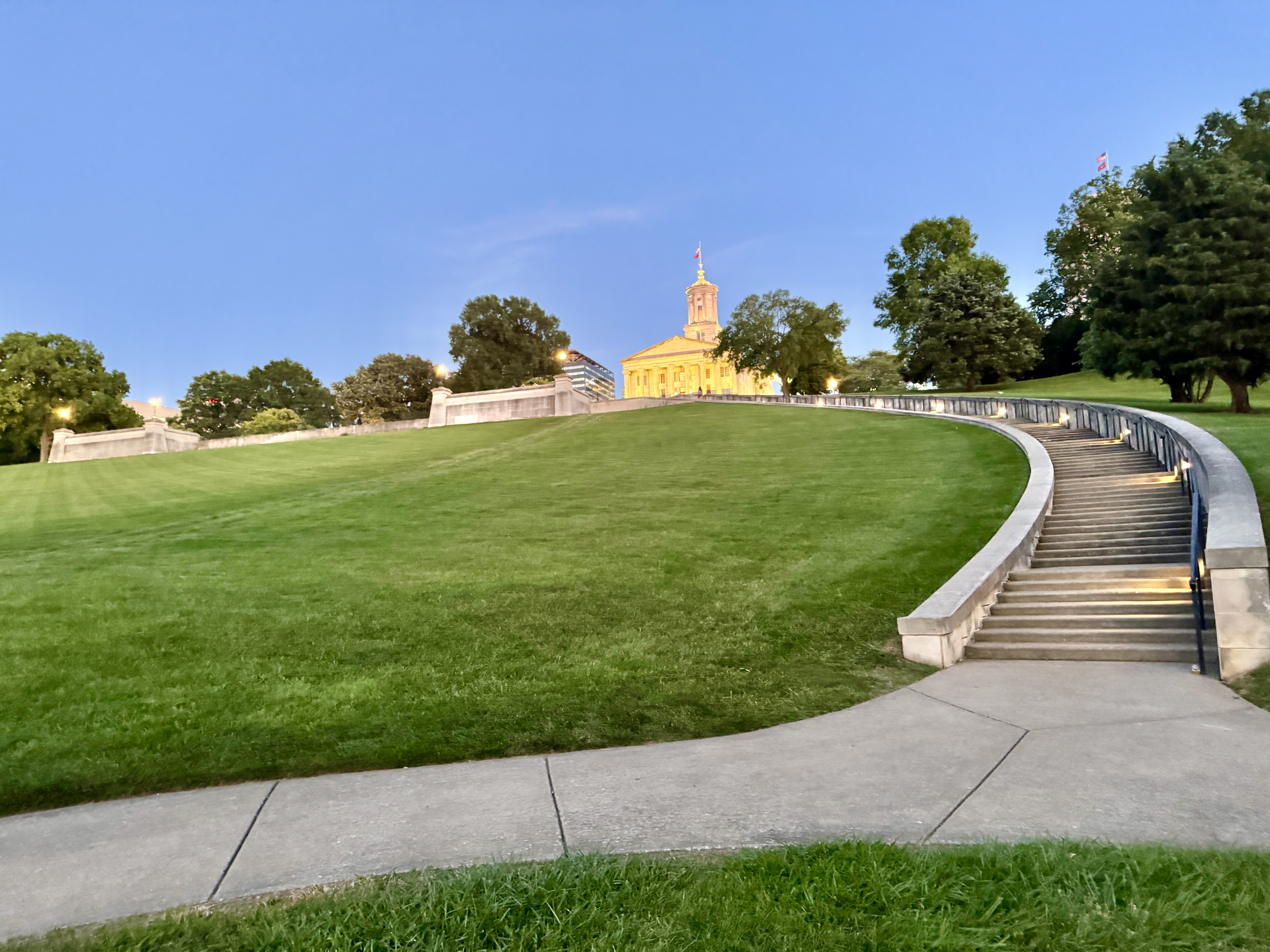
Stairwells were constructed to connect the park to the state capitol building, and the north slope of Capitol Hill was cleared to improve visibility and aesthetics between the two landmarks.

In January 1995, Governor Don Sundquist took office, and the project fell under the jurisdiction of new Finance Commissioner Bob Corker, who later became a U.S. Senator. Sundquist initially moved to stop construction of the mall upon taking office, due to escalating costs and his disdain for McWherter's appointment of then-Vice President and Tennessean Al Gore as the honorary co-chair of the bicentennial commission. Corker advised him against this, and former U.S. Senator Howard Baker and Republican donor Ted Welch also encouraged him to keep the project alive. The new farmer's market opened on June 19, 1995, allowing for demolition of the old structure at the north end of the site. It was dedicated on October 21. On April 27, 1996, the time capsules in the Walkway of the Counties were buried by representatives of each respective county in a ceremony.

Concerns were raised by the bicentennial commission about whether or not the park would be ready for public use for the bicentennial festivities, and they initially planned to allow only legislators and business donors on the mall for the dedication. Governor Sundquist urged them to open it to the public, to which they agreed. The final construction cost was $51 million. (Note: Equivalent to $93.9 million in 2024) The mall opened on May 31, 1996, at 8 am Central Time. Later that afternoon, the Tennessee Bicentennial postage stamp was unveiled in the first event held in the Tennessee Amphitheater by Governor Sundquist, former Governor McWherter, Nashville Mayor and later Governor Phil Bredesen, Bicentennial Commission Chairman Martha Rivers Ingram, and Postmaster General Marvin Travis Runyon. The following day, the park was dedicated in a ceremony with speeches from Governor Sundquist, McWherter, Gore, Ingram, and Tennessee House Speaker Jimmy Naifeh as part of a celebration of Tennessee's 200th anniversary of statehood. A poem celebrating the occasion was delivered by poet laureate Margaret Britton Vaughn. Following the dedication, a cannon salute was issued from the Belvedere overlook by the Tennessee National Guard. A large stage was erected atop the Tennessee Map Plaza for the event, and a special session of the state legislature was held to celebrate the occasion. The ceremony was followed by a music tribute called "Celebration of the Centuries", which consisted of performances from the Nashville Symphony and several prominent Tennessee musicians. A fireworks show concluded the celebration.

=== Later history ===
While major components of the original design of the mall were incomplete at its dedication, State Architect Mike Fitts, Nashville State Senator Douglas Henry, and others worked to ensure their completion. In addition, initial reception of the park was somewhat lukewarm from many people, and continued to be so for many years as the park remained incomplete and underused. The Zero Milestone was installed on September 15, 1996, by the Tennessee Department of Transportation to replace a previous marker that went missing in the 1980s. A small bronze sundial was installed by the Colonial Dames of America near the amphitheater on May 14, 1997, and damaged shortly thereafter. The World War II Memorial broke ground on July 1, 1996, and was dedicated on Veterans Day, November 11, 1997. This monument was not part of the original plan, and was conceived by Fitts, who convinced the Tennessee World War II Memorial Foundation and its leader General Enoch Stephenson to develop an educational monument about the war for the mall. A time capsule was buried at the monument on July 18, 1998. On April 18, 1998, the Civilian Conservation Corps monument was dedicated in a ceremony officiated by David B. Roosevelt, a grandson of President Franklin D. Roosevelt. The Pathway of Volunteers pavers were dedicated on August 8, 1998. Later that year, the history wall was completed, which included the erection of the civil rights monument. A single misspelling of the word "ratifying" on the wall from the initial construction was later corrected. The Charles Warterfield Reliquary was dedicated on August 8, 1999. Construction on the carillon began in January 1999, and operation began on July 14, 2000. The bell on Capitol Hill was dedicated on June 1, 2003. This was the final element of the original vision for the mall complex.

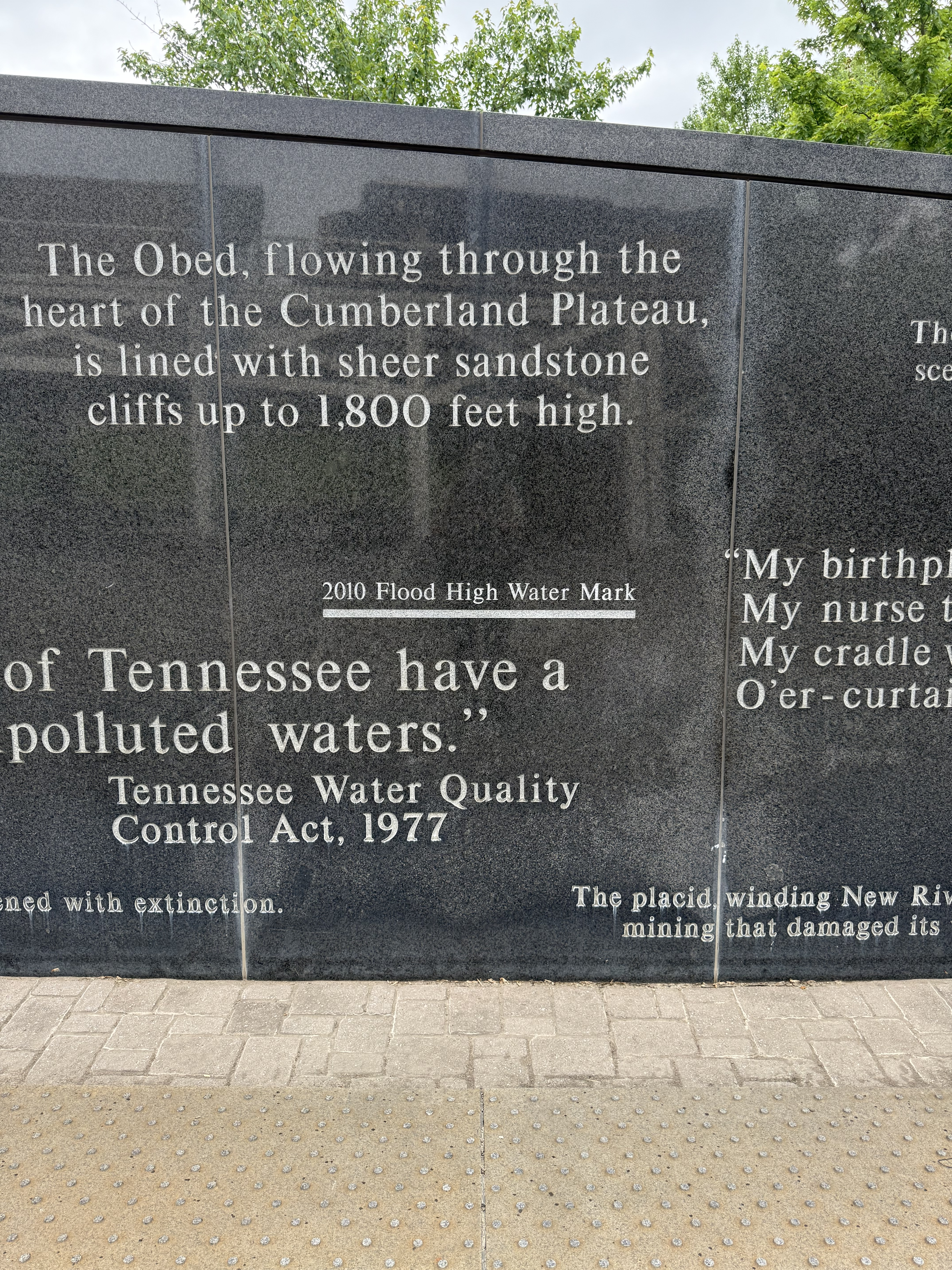
The high water mark of the 2010 floods on the Rivers of Tennessee Wall

The park also faced operational challenges in its early years, with state agencies disagreeing over responsibility for landscape maintenance. As early as November 1996, the park was reported to be draining resources from other state parks. On April 16, 1998, a tornado from a larger outbreak damaged the roof of the farmer's market. The Rivers of Tennessee Fountains soon became clogged by sunscreen residue and experienced periodic malfunctions. The pipes to the fountains were replaced with larger ones in the winter of 2001. The fountains were further upgraded in a project between October 2006 and June 2007 that replaced the granite rigs surrounding each fountain, restored the surrounding concrete pavement, and upgraded the drainage system. The original recessed lights illuminating the 95 county seats, which consumed over 3,000 watts of electricity, were prone to water leaks and electrical shorts. They were replaced with solar-powered LED luminaires in 2019. The roundabouts at the intersections along the surrounding roads were designed to deter truck traffic, but large trucks still passed through the area and caused damage to directional limestone piers. The trough at the base of the Rivers of Tennessee Wall was refinished with brick pavers. Complaints were also voiced about absent and misspelled city names on the map plaza.

The south end of the park was inundated with waters from the catastrophic floods in early May 2010, which destroyed electrical systems. A line marking the floodwaters' highest point was engraved on the river wall shortly thereafter. On October 20, 2013, the pedestrian walkways along the east and west sides of the mall were named in honor of Andrea Conte. The Tennessee Department of Transportation placed a time capsule on the north end of the park on July 1, 2015, as part of a celebration of the agency's centennial; it will be unearthed on July 1, 2115. Tornadoes on the night of March 3, 2020, uprooted several trees in the park. In October 2020, a POW/MIA "empty seat" memorial was installed along the Pathway of History. A master plan developed for the state-owned properties around the mall between 1996 and 1998 stipulated that the new state museum and library should be located on the east side of the park. Relocation of the museum and library were also suggested in a 2005 plan published by Nashville Civic Design Center, but the final plan took several years to materialize. The new museum opened on October 4, 2018, and the new state library opened on April 13, 2021. This effectively fulfilled the original long-term vision of the park's architects, and further cemented the park as a cultural and historic landmark. The 25th anniversary of the state park was commemorated by Governor Bill Lee and other state officials on June 1, 2021, as part of celebrations of Tennessee's 225th anniversary. On February 23, 2026, a project was launched to enhance lighting and electrical systems and refurbish the Rivers of Tennessee Fountains and carillon.

== Legacy and events ==
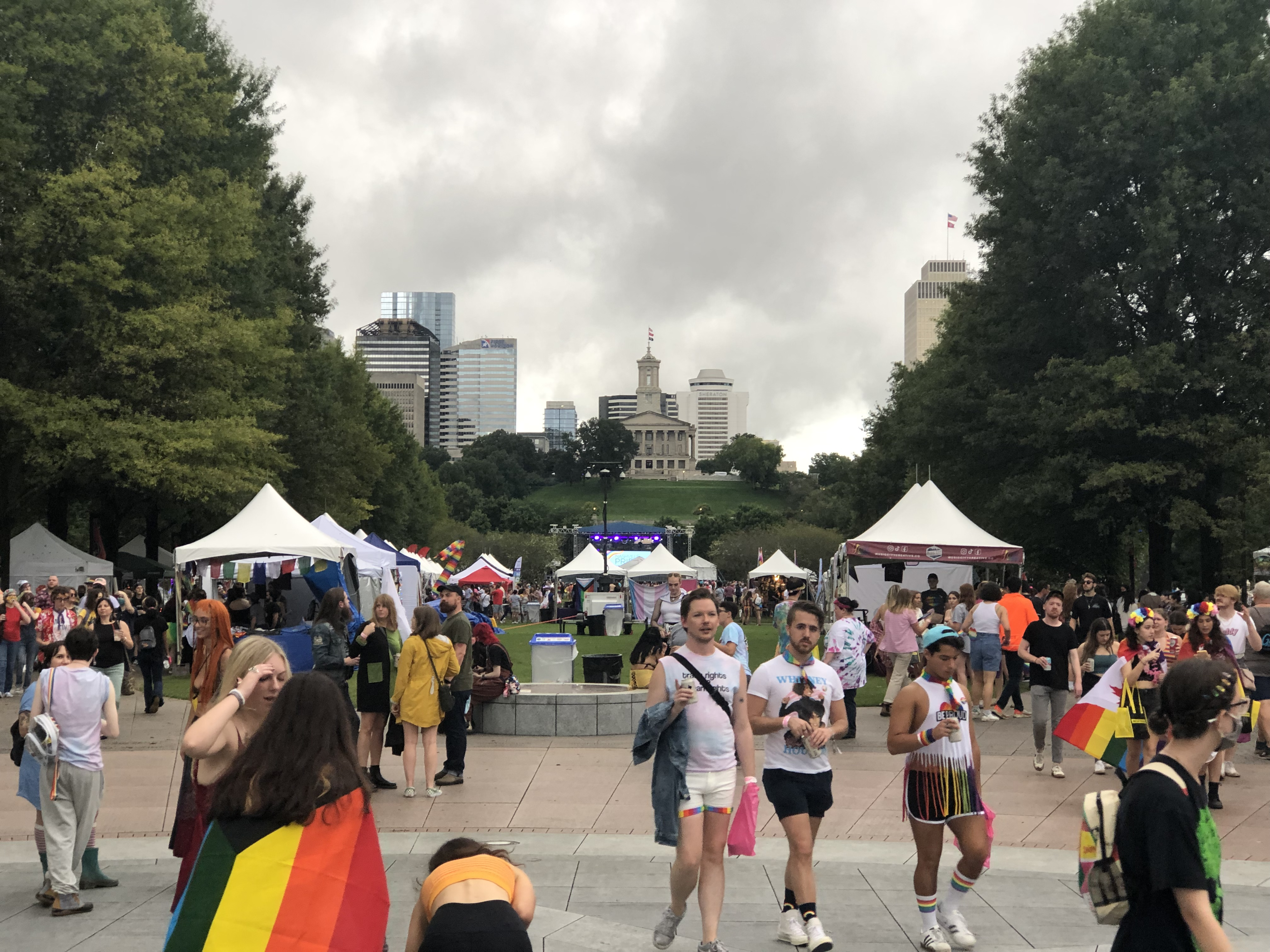
Nashville Pride festival in 2021

Since its opening, Bicentennial Capitol Mall State Park has routinely hosted numerous events, including festivals, concerts, and community gatherings. It has come to be the most visited state park in Tennessee and one of the most visited public spaces in Nashville, receiving more than 2.5 million visitors each year. It was ranked by the Nashville Business Journal as the number one tourist attraction in Nashville in 2006. In 2011, the American Planning Association listed the park as one of the top ten public spaces in the United States. Since 2016, the park has hosted a New Year's Eve celebration which features concerts and the ceremonious dropping of a musical note, owing to the city's music industry and nickname of "Music City". Over 200,000 people attend the event each year. In addition, the park routinely offers tours and interpretive events. Over the years, the Nashville Oktoberfest festival has moved into the park. Originally held completely in the Germantown neighborhood northeast of the park, portions of the festival have moved into the park as the celebration has grown. Parts of the park are routinely rented for music festivals, the longest running of which is the Deep Tropics Festival, which has taken place in August of each year since 2019. Nashville Pride has taken place at the mall since 2021. The mall is also a frequent location for political rallies, demonstrations, and protests.

In addition to being a site for events held by third-party groups, park staff also hold interpretive and educational programs throughout the year. Since 2004, the mall has hosted the Tennessee History Festival, now called the Tennessee Timeline. This event, which takes place during the second weekend in October, has reenactors of historical figures and events, and numerous exhibits chronicling the state's history. The event now coincides with the Southern Festival of Books, which moved to the park in 2023 to resume being held in between the Tennessee State Museum and Tennessee State Library and Archives after the two institutions moved to their current locations. Each year on or around June 1, Tennessee's statehood day, the park, along with its neighbors at the state museum and the state library, hold a day of celebration. The day's activities include display of the three constitutions of the state of Tennessee, speakers, and historical reenactors.

== Gallery ==
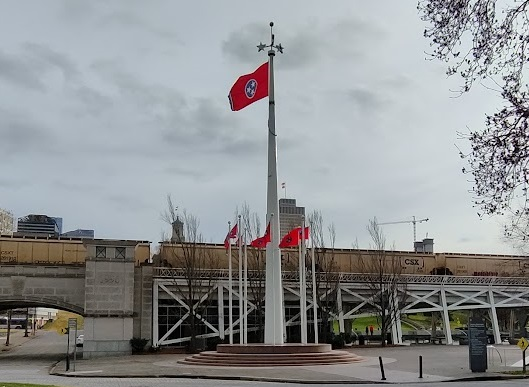
One of two groups of Tennessee Flags near the south end of the park

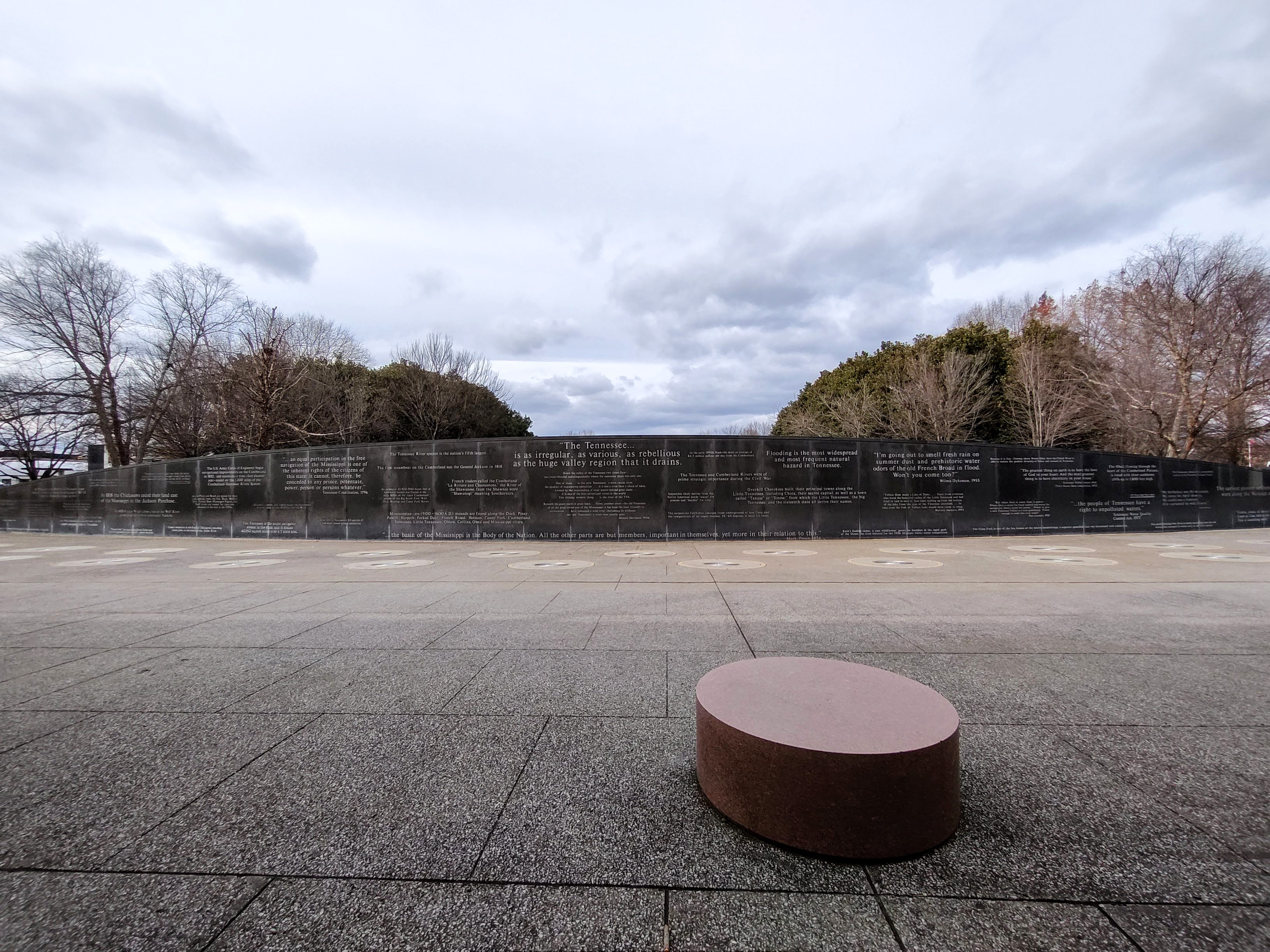
Rivers of Tennessee fountains and monument wall

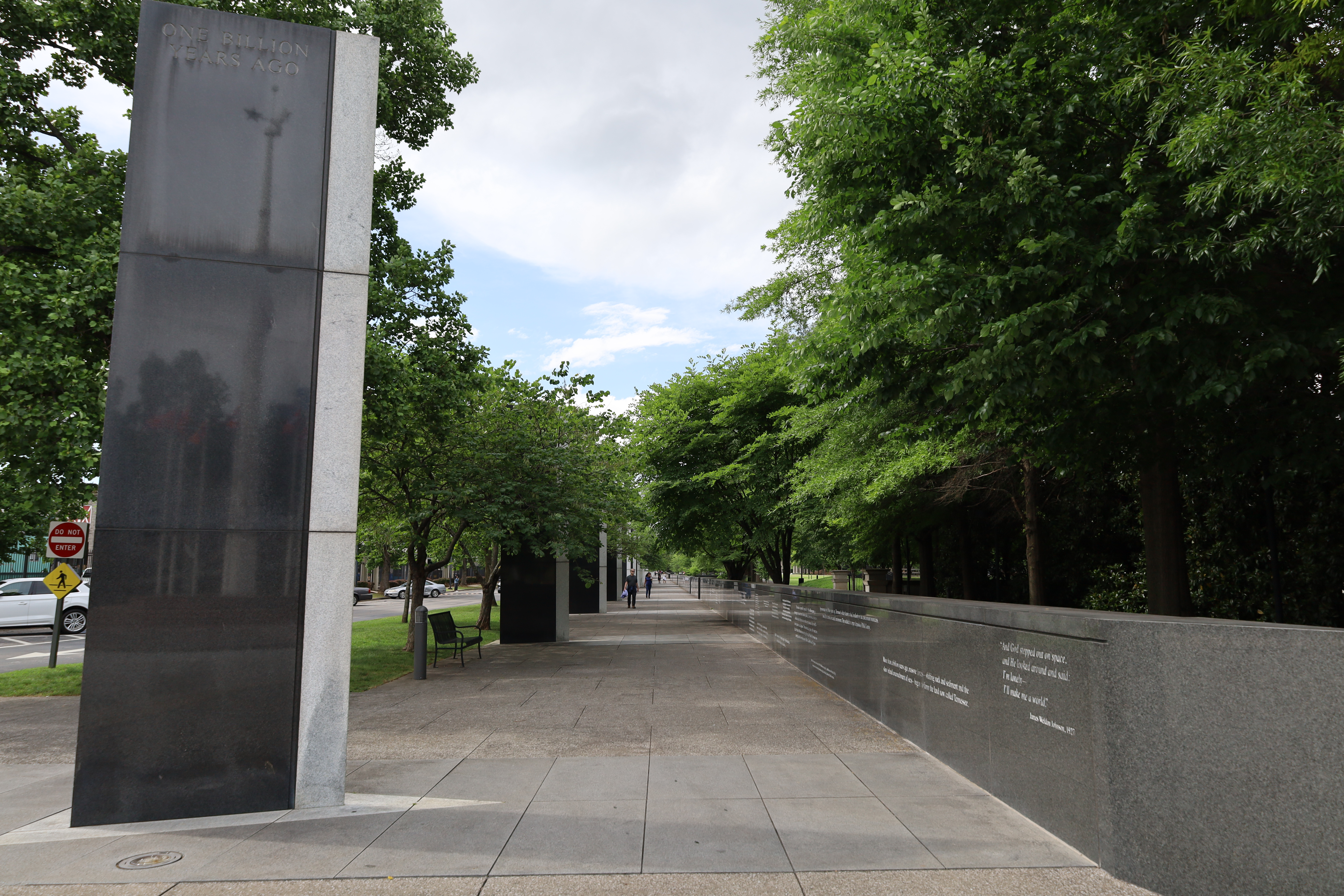
The Pathway of History

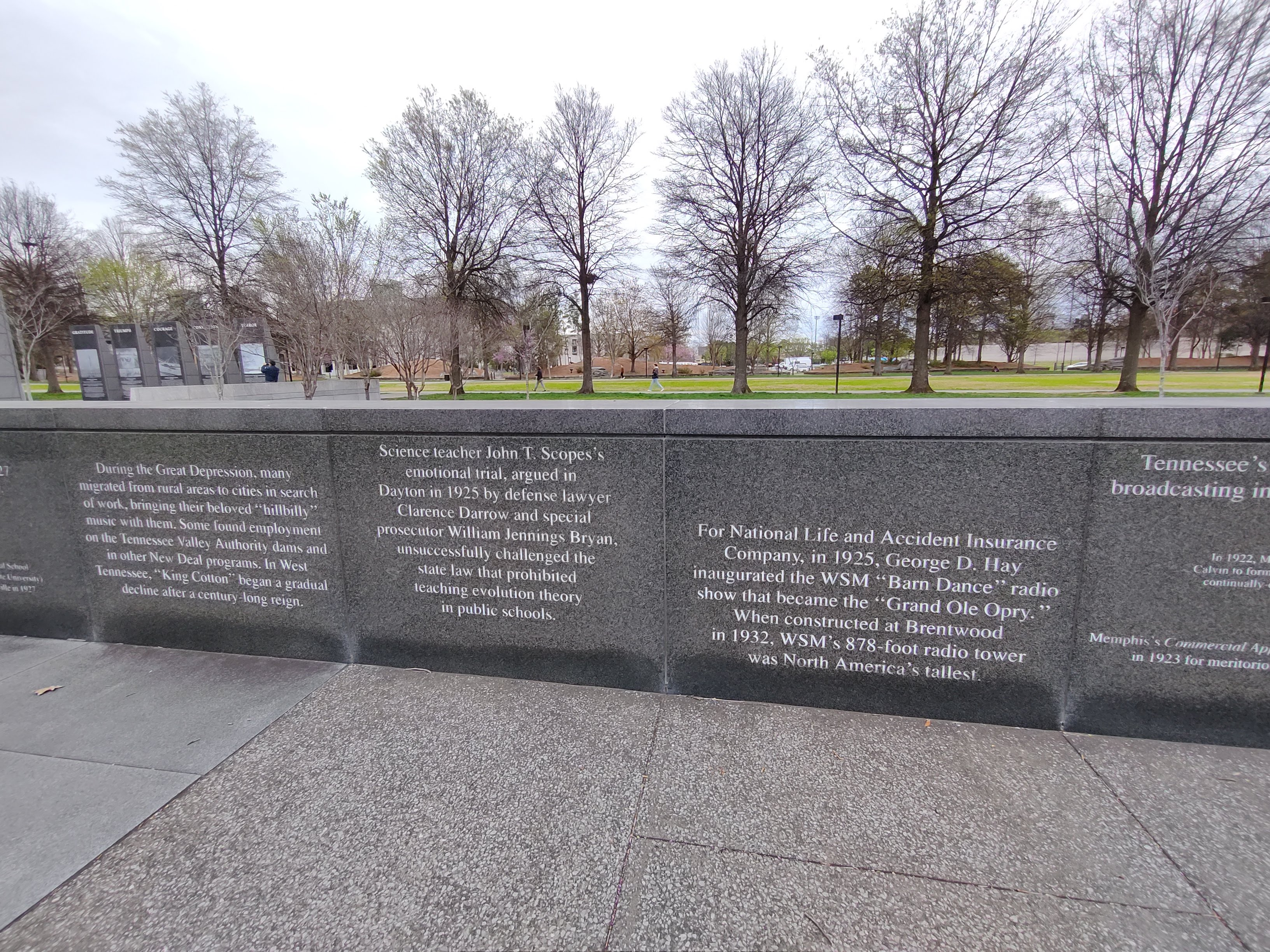
The History Wall

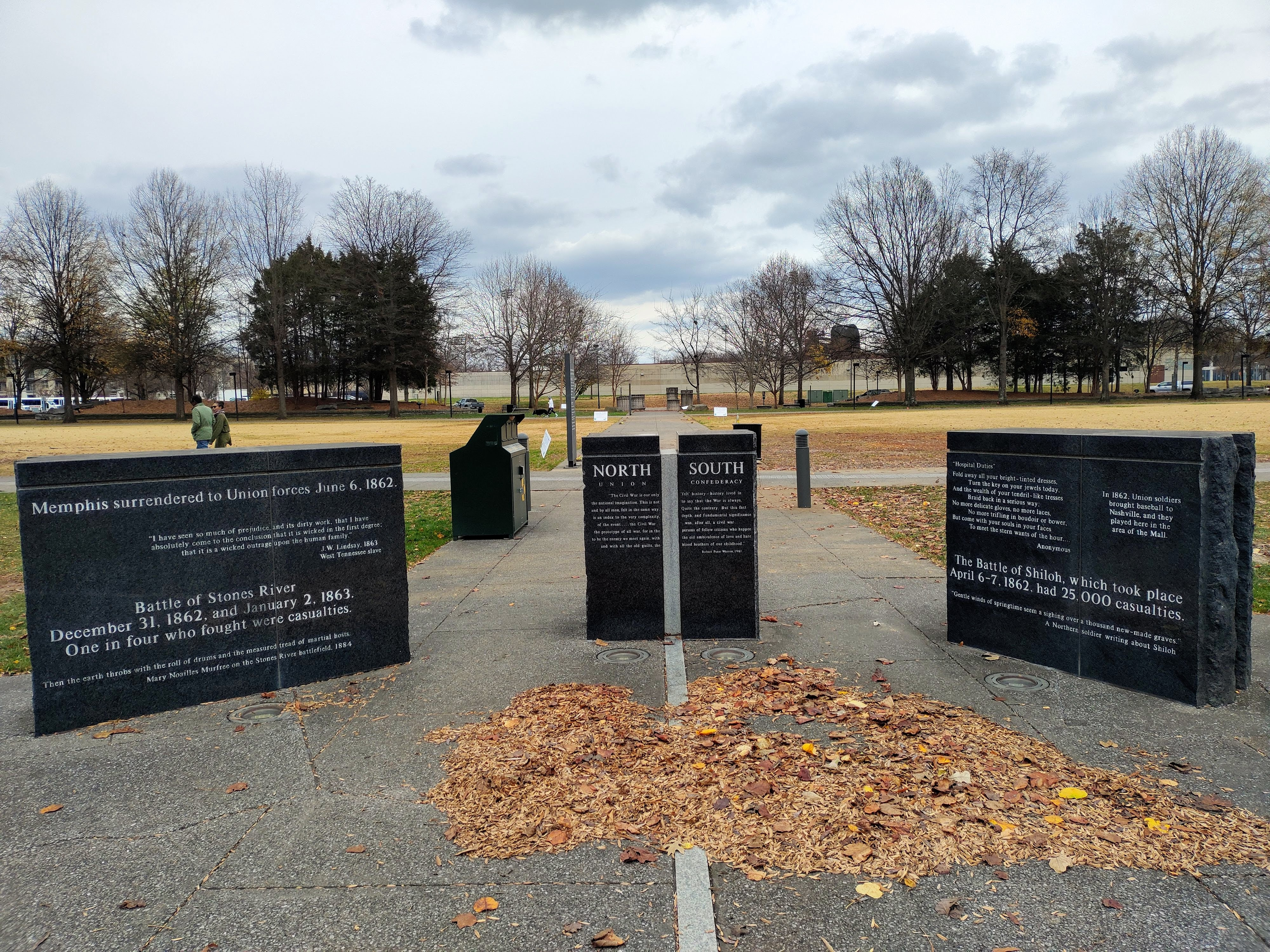
Civil War monuments on the History Wall

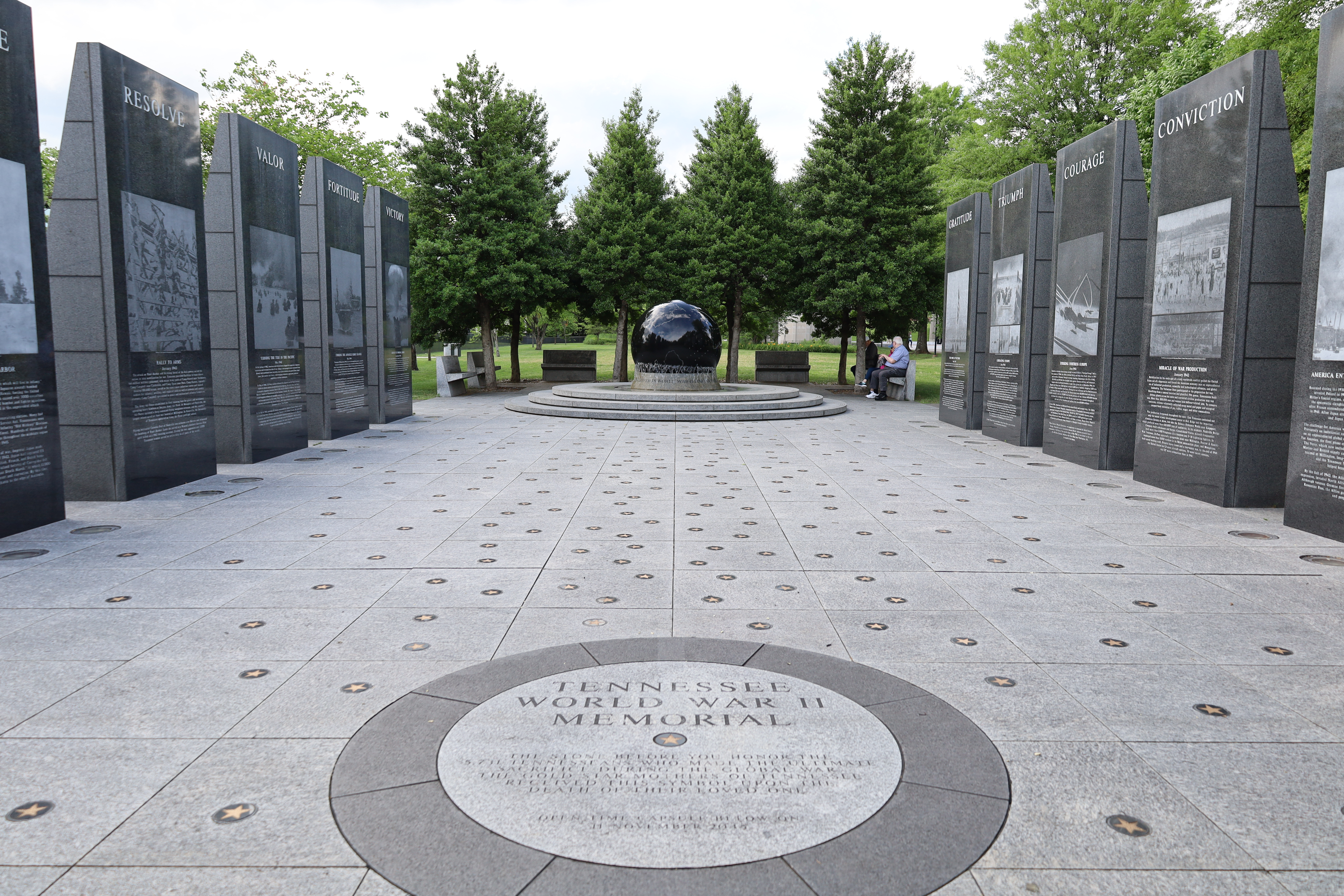
Tennessee World War II Memorial

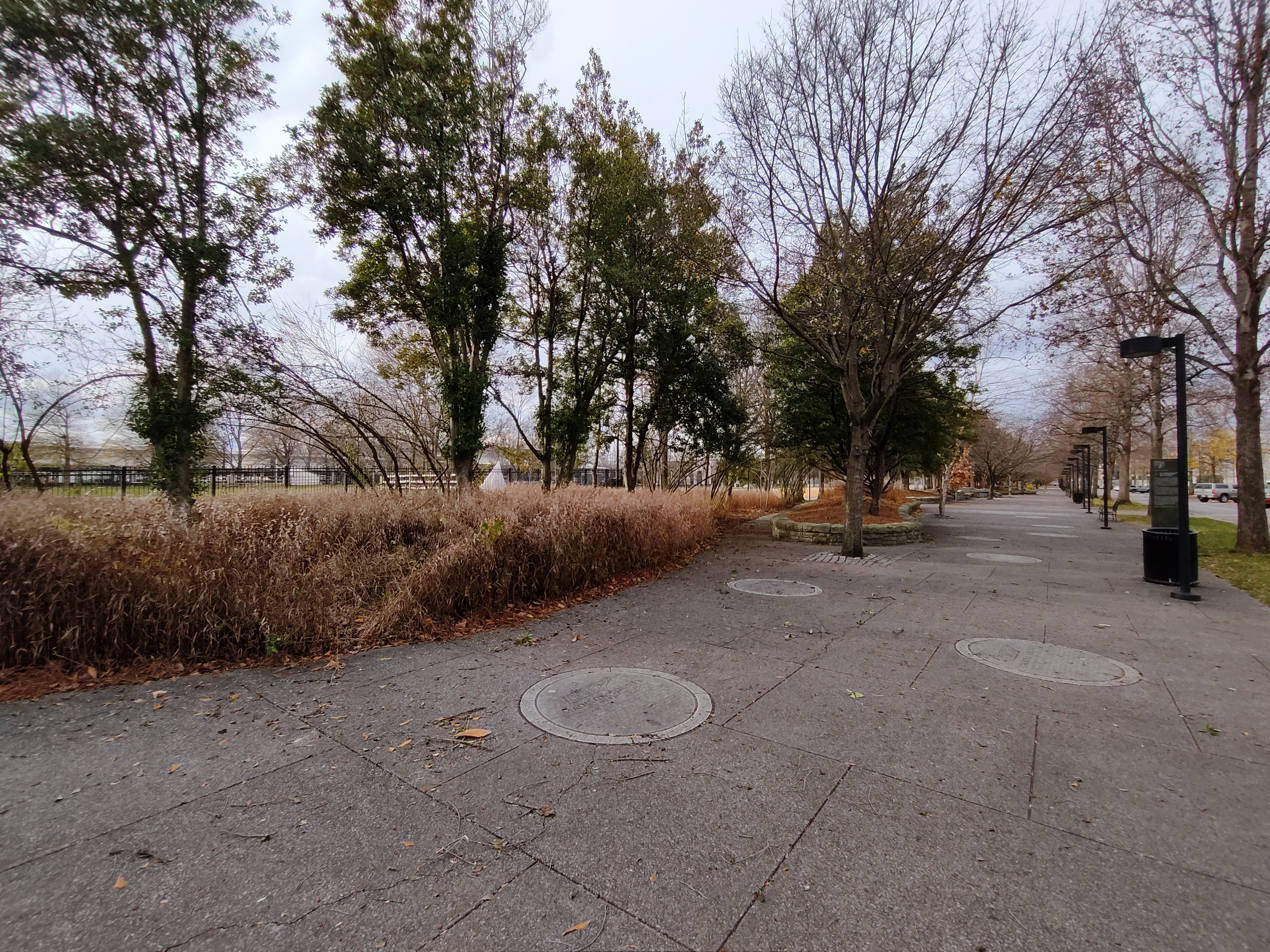
The Walkway of the Counties

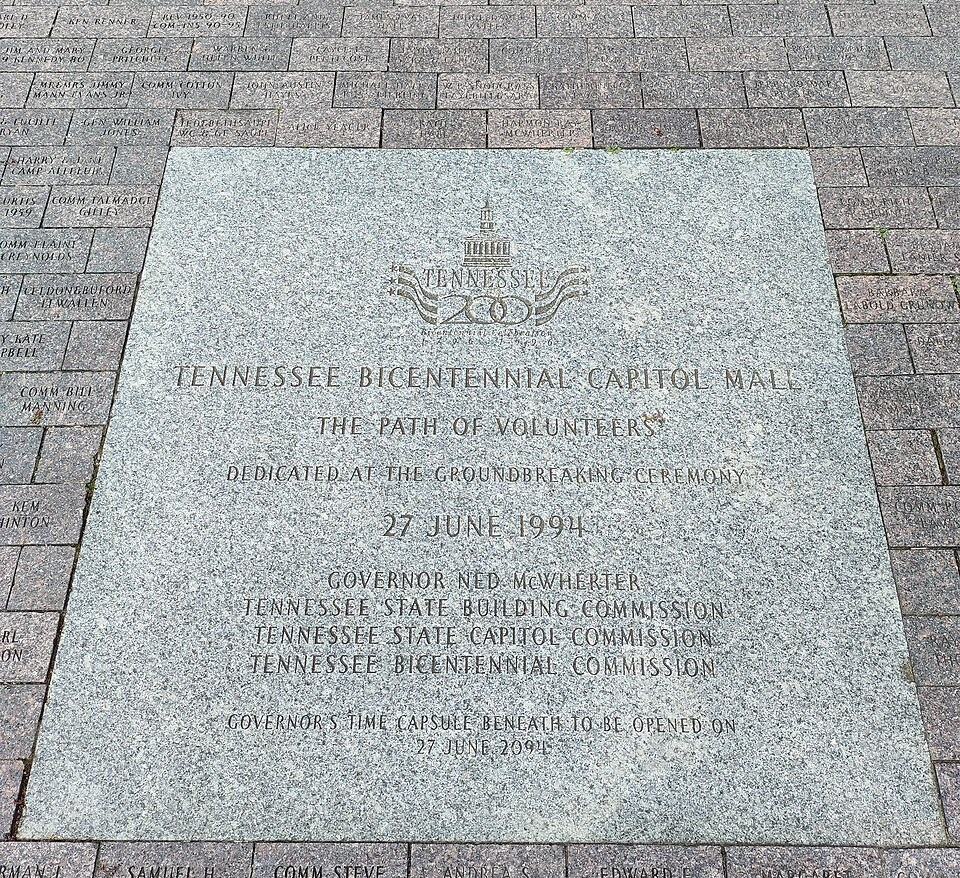
McWherter Time Capsule

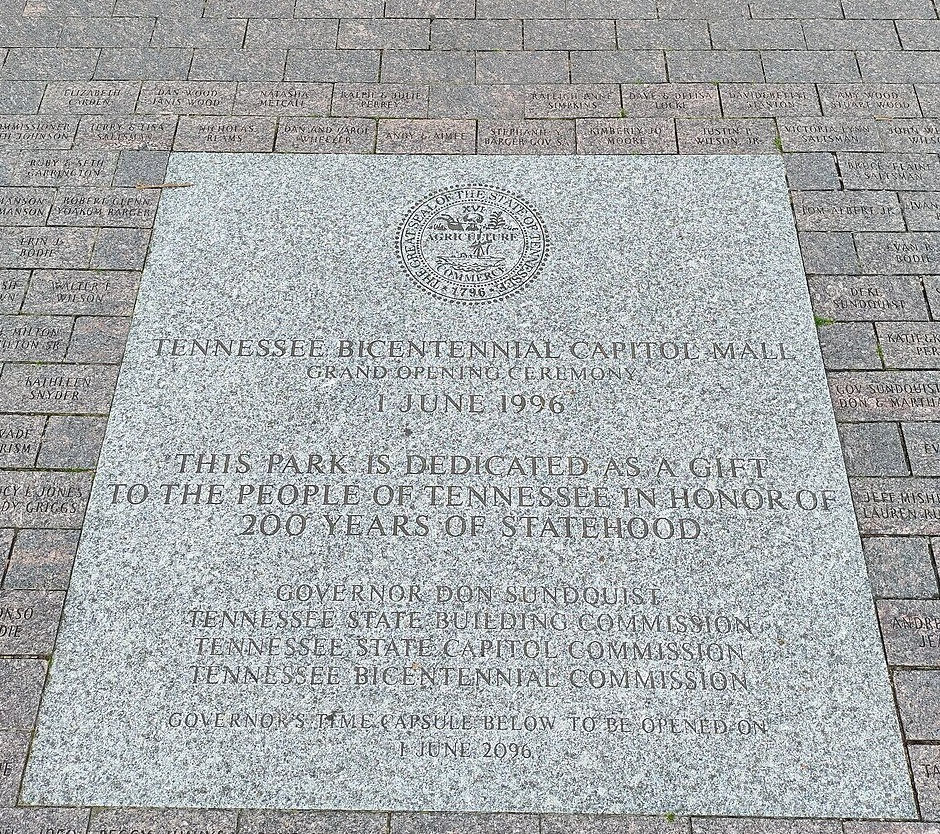
Sundquist Time Capsule

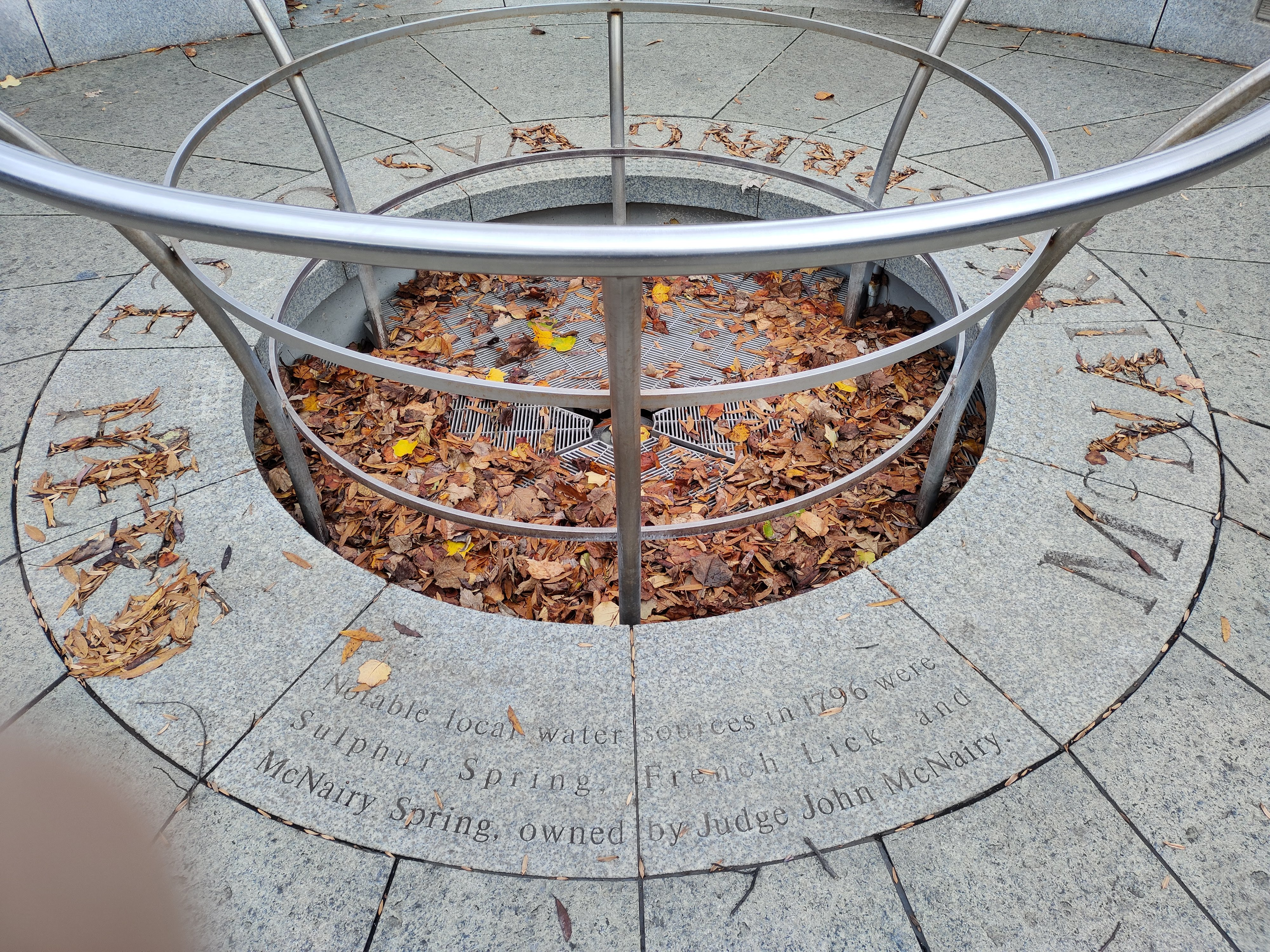
Fountain over the site of McNairy Spring at the Statehood Memorial

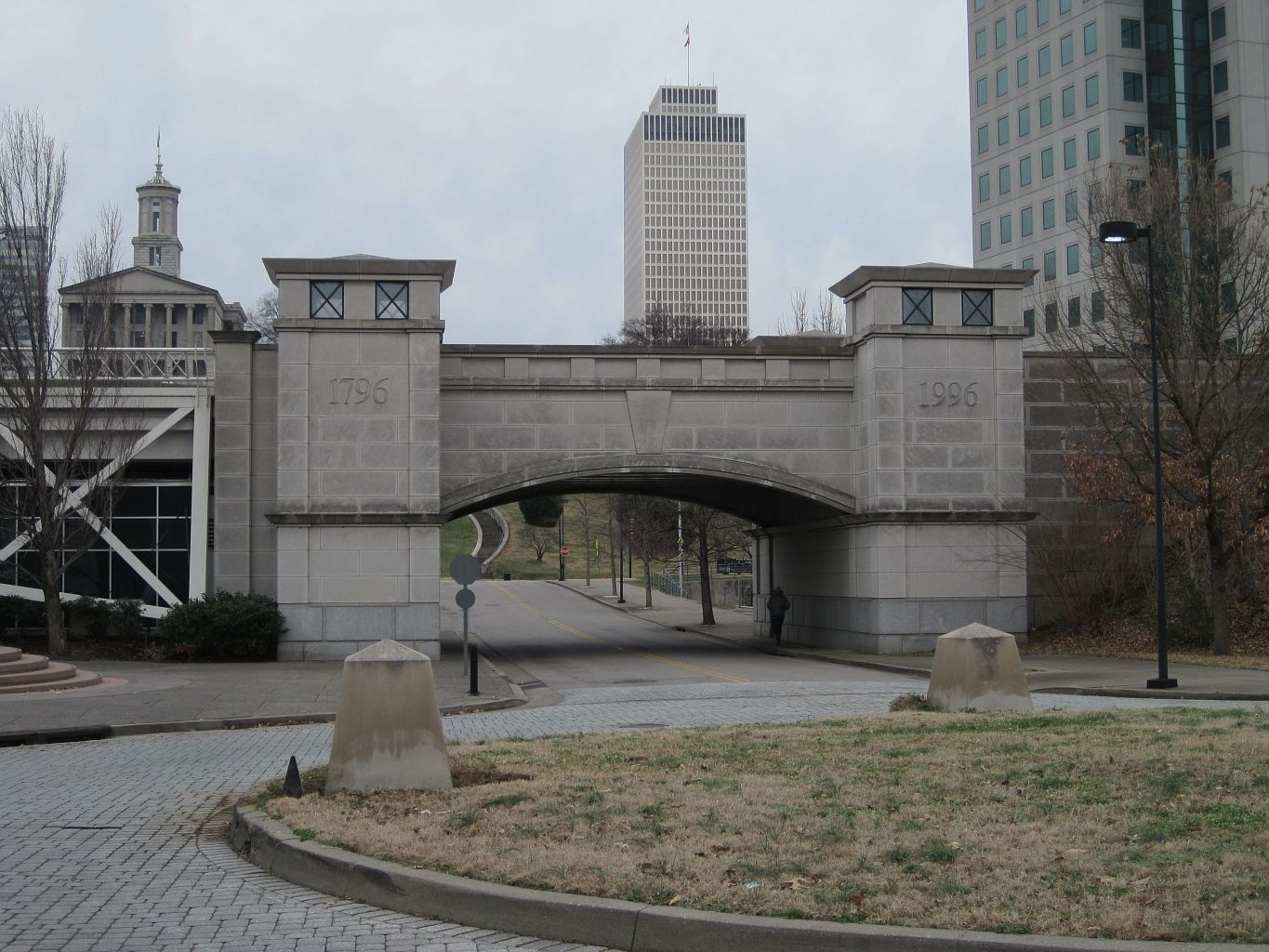
Railroad bridge over 7th Avenue at the end of the trestle
