= Southern Festival of Books =

Annual literary festival in Nashville, Tennessee

- Genre: Literary festival
- Locations: Nashville, Tennessee, United States
- Founded: 1989

The Southern Festival of Books is an annual literary festival in Nashville, Tennessee. It was established in 1989 as a project of Humanities Tennessee. The 2019 festival included panel discussions and book signings with "more than 200 authors."

During the COVID-19 pandemic the Festival was held online. Since the Festival's 35th anniversary it has been held at Bicentennial Capitol Mall State Park, the Tennessee State Museum, and the Tennessee State Library and Archives.

For most of its history the Festival was partly funded by federal grants, which were discontinued during the second Trump administration, but the Festival was able to continue operations after securing a partnership with Vanderbilt University.
