= Hell's Half Acre (Nashville, Tennessee) =

Neighborhood in Nashville, Tennessee, USA

Hell's Half Acre was a neighborhood and could be seen in the line of sight northwest of the present-day Tennessee State Capitol. As the African American population of Nashville increased following the conclusion of the Civil War, Hell's Half Acre housed much of the city's 37% black population in 1900. The area became a hub for African American culture and black-owned or operated businesses, churches, and schools. Additionally, the neighborhood followed the common trend for many urban neighborhoods during this time as it became a center for various Vices. Prostitution became common with the presence of its red-light district, and gambling was also commonplace. Nevertheless, Hell's Half Acre leaves a legacy highlighting African Americans' experiences and cultural contributions through the Reconstruction era, with some highlighting the origins of Nashville hot chicken to have been near the area.

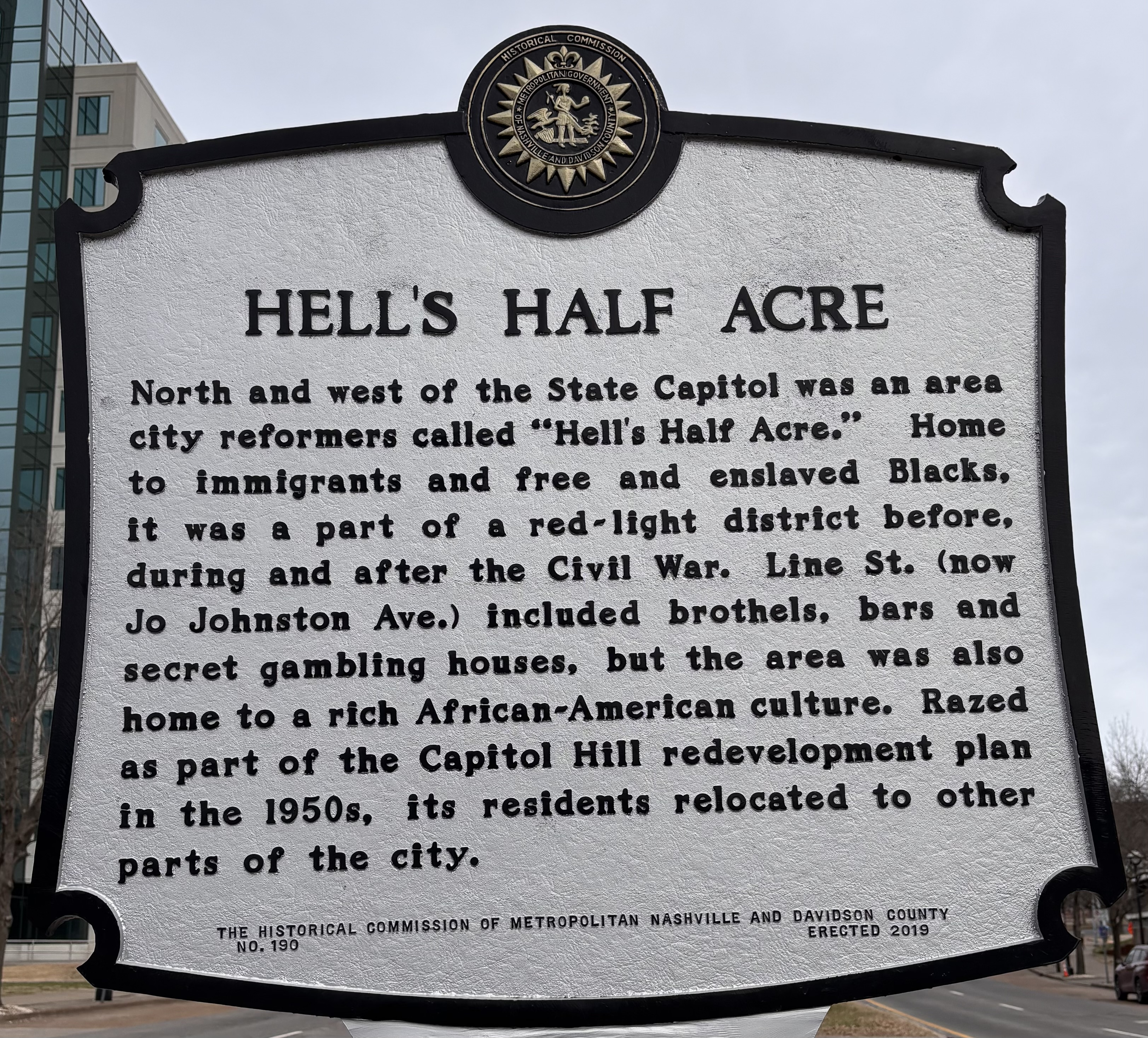
A historic marker regarding the Hell's Half Acre neighborhood.

== Origin ==
The climate and other agricultural conditions proved ideal for the growth of many southern staples like tobacco and cotton in the greater Nashville area and its surroundings. Geographically located on the Cumberland River, Nashville allowed for easy transportation of goods, especially after the advent of the steamboat. As Nashville grew, so did the gap in socioeconomic class. A key factor, beyond the boundaries of class created by the onset of the Civil War and slavery, was the city's topography.

Promptly after the conclusion of the Civil War, the Nashville area became an area of substantial economic growth, opportunity, and prosperity. Rapid industrialization provided job opportunities and a path away from a largely agricultural-based economy. Lower, flatter lands near the Cumberland River were ideal for industry and saw the bulk of this industrial growth. Given that a large number of Nashville's poorer population worked in industry, particularly marginalized black populations, many of the neighborhoods in these areas became the origin of communities like Hell's Half Acre. Constant flooding of the Cumberland River would restrict the movement of the inhabitants of Hell's Half Acre, allowing for it to develop considerably in the years after its settlement.

== Reconstruction ==
As the Reconstruction period in the United States saw the integration of formerly enslaved people into society, neighborhoods in Nashville like Hell's Half Acre transformed parallel to this trend. The black population increased in Hell's Half Acre, resulting in the number of black-owned businesses, churches, and schools that specifically catered to the community. In this way, business districts flourished as frequenters were residents within the functionally segregated neighborhood. At the turn of the 20th century, just under half of all African American businesses in Nashville operated within Hell's Half Acre. These included grocery stores, restaurants, clothing stores, and black-owned publishing and printing institutions. Notable among these were the National Baptist Publishing Company and the Nashville Globe.

During the Civil War, prostitution was prevalent in Nashville. Union troops often found themselves at brothels on Smoky Row. As a result, sexually transmitted diseases became a debilitating problem. Prostitution became legal in Nashville under strict regulations that saw the rates of STIs decline. During Reconstruction, however, public prostitution became criminalized with the passage of the Prostitution Bill in 1866. Hell's Half Acre swiftly became an entertainment hub and vice district filled with brothels and gambling halls as the bill pushed prostitution indoors. Despite many of the residents being much of Nashville's poor black population, its location between areas of industry and the mostly elite business districts enabled integration to still exist in Hell's Half Acre. Thus, a vast clientele, both rich and poor as well as black and white, sought illicit services here. Eventually, city officials worked to shut down much of the entertainment district, following general trends discouraging vice districts. Just as prostitution did not end with the passage of the Prostitution Bill in 1866, prostitution in Nashville did not end there either. Instead, it spread throughout the city, making policing much more difficult. As a final blow to the neighborhood, city officials disregarded Hell's Half Acre in a series of urban projects, including those meant to redevelop the nearby Capitol building.

== Capitol Hill Redevelopment Plan of 1949 ==
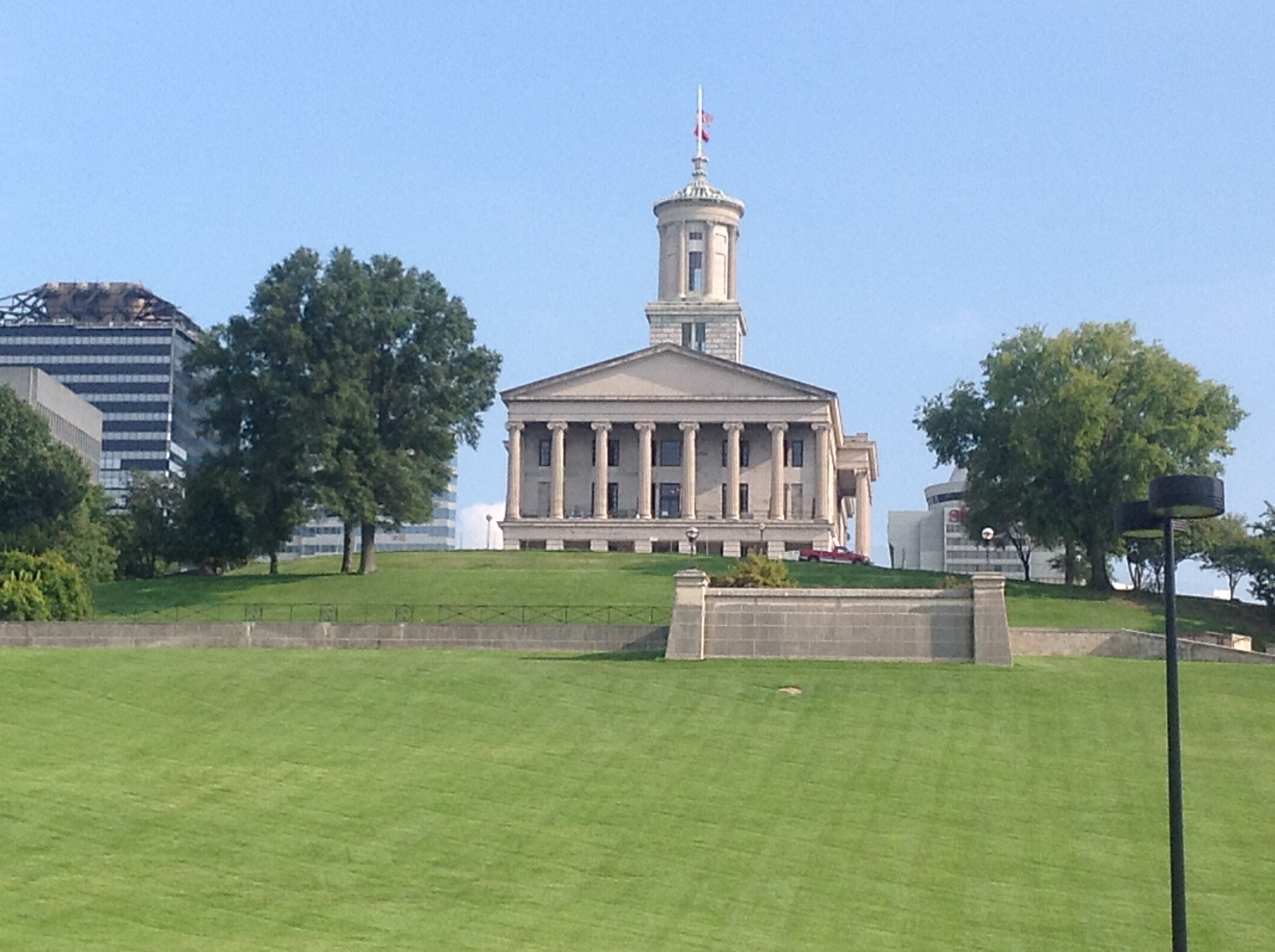
The Tennessee State Capitol in Nashville, Tennessee

Beginning in 1949 with official demolitions starting in 1953, the Nashville Housing Authority launched an urban renewal project focused on the improvement of the area surrounding the Tennessee State Capitol where Hell's Half Acre stood. It was one of the first wide-scale urban renewal projects in the United States and the first to be funded by the U.S. Congress. Led by Gerald Gimre, the executive director of the Nashville Housing Authority at the time, the organization systematically bought out, razed, and rebuilt Hell's Half Acre, transforming it into the current Capitol Hill district. The project initially struggled due to limited federal support and lingering troubles from the aftermath of World War II. However, momentum grew as the ongoing housing crisis, public outcry about the reputation of Hell's Half Acre, and petitions made by Gimre to influential figures who approved of slum clearance secured the backing needed to proceed. The passing of the Housing Act of 1949 by the U.S. House of Representatives acted as the final step needed for the project's funding, which set aside one and a half billion dollars for slum clearance programs across the United States. The city of Nashville was given six million dollars towards the project and proceeded to buy out the rest of Hell's Half Acre from its residents in subsequent years.

== Economy ==
During the height of the neighborhood's existence in the late 19th and early 20th centuries, the metropolitan economy of the Hell's Half Acre neighborhood was substantial. The area had a diversified economy that spanned fields such as banking, dining, tailoring, food retail, entertainment, and publishing. The driving force for this diversification was to develop a system of self-reliance. Businesses outside of the area often refused to cooperate with those from the neighborhood due to its unsavory reputation and the prominent African-American population. At the start of the 20th century, 43% of Nashville's black-owned businesses were located in the neighborhood. These businesses were concentrated on Cedar Street (now Charlotte Avenue) and Fourth Avenue of Nashville.

=== Prostitution ===
Hell's Half Acre served as one of Nashville's largest vice districts and prostitution was one of the most lucrative enterprises in the area. The industry grew exponentially during the Civil War when the practice was made legal by the Union army in an attempt to appease soldiers in Union-occupied Nashville. It continued to grow long after the end of the Civil War despite the practice being made illegal and only began to dwindle in the 1920s. The prominence of prostitution in the area allowed working women to have a level of personal and economic freedom otherwise unavailable to them at the time. Additionally, the lack of government intervention in the neighborhood enabled female brothel owners or madams to have considerable influence over the affairs of the area.

== Popular culture ==
=== Prince's Bar-B-Que Chicken Shack ===
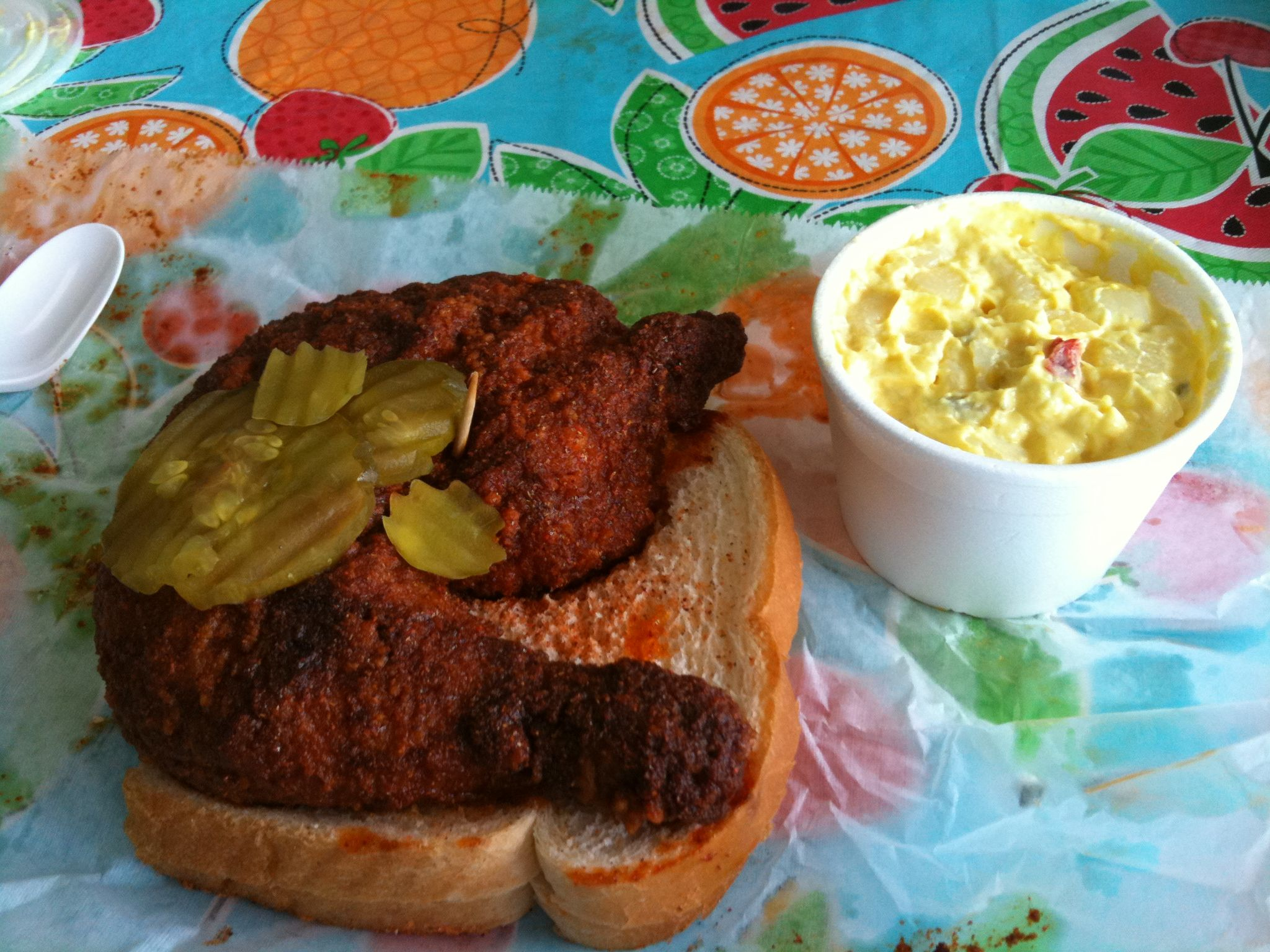
Nashville-style Hot Chicken from Prince's

Originally based at the corner of Jefferson Street and 28th Avenue, Hell's Half Acre was home to Prince's Bar-B-Que Chicken Shack (now Prince's Hot Chicken Shack) after the owners of the establishment decided to move the business downtown. This restaurant chain is widely accredited for its connections to the origin of Nashville's hot chicken. The restaurant was at the heart of the Capitol Hill Redevelopment Plan of 1949 conducted by the city of Nashville during the 1950s and 1960s. As a direct result of the project, the restaurant was forced to move further north to 17th Avenue North and Charlotte Avenue.

=== Hell's Half Acre (comic book series) ===
A supernatural western-noir comic book series of the same name was created in a partnership between Magma Comix and Ruptura Estudios. Written by Denton J. Tipton and drawn by Ramon Bunge, the series is set in the year 1904 where Britt, a notorious gambler, must survive the chaotic and lawless environment of the neighborhood after a series of events that he puts in motion. The first issue was published on June 5th, 2024.
