= Germantown Historic District =

Historic district in Nashville, Tennessee

- U.S. National Register of Historic Places
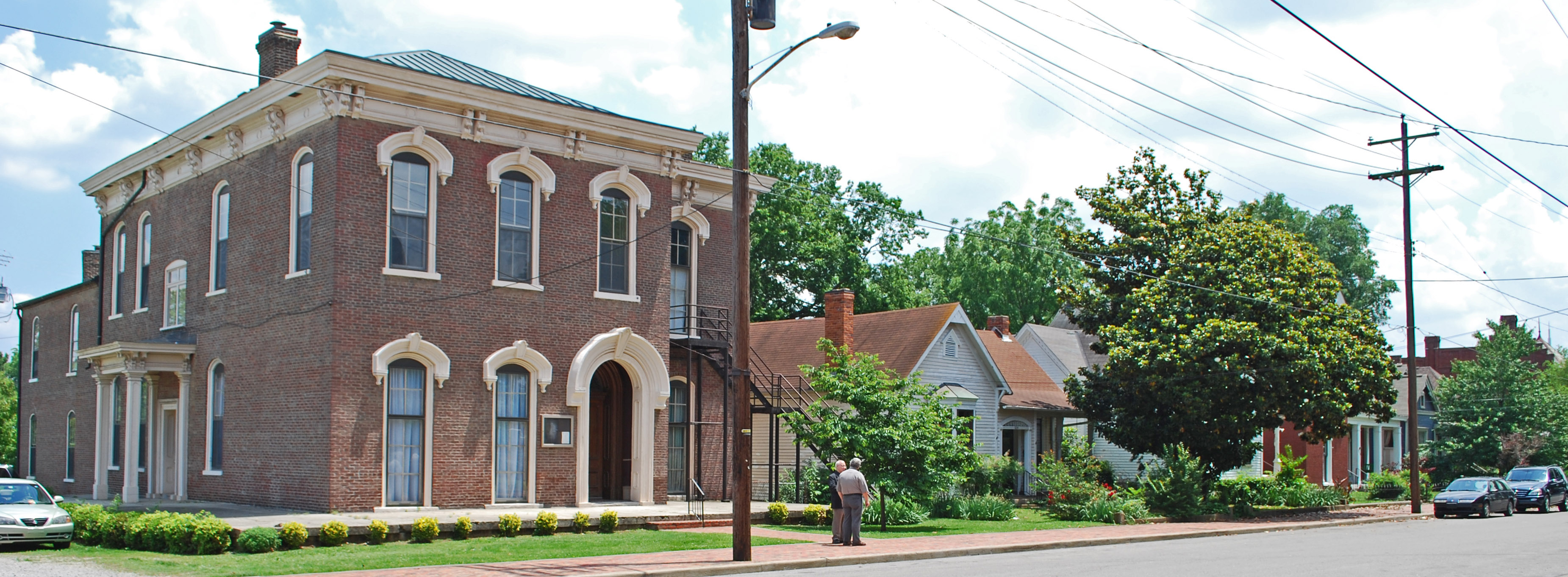
- Germantown Historic District (7th at Monroe)

- Location within Tennessee Location within the United States
- Location: Nashville, Tennessee
- Coordinates: 36.176667°N 86.790278°W
- Built: 1850-1874; 1875-1899; 1900-1924
- Architect: Multiple
- Architectural style: Italianate architecture; Stick architecture; Eastlake architecture; Queen Anne style architecture
- Website: historicgermantown.org
- NRHP reference No.: 79002422
- Added to NRHP: August 1, 1979

Germantown Historic District is a historic neighborhood in North Nashville, Tennessee. It was listed on the National Register of Historic Places listings in Davidson County, Tennessee (NRHP) on August 1, 1979.

== History ==
Historic Germantown is Nashville's oldest neighborhood. Immigrants from Germany began to build homes there in the 1840s. The area was established as Germantown in the 1850s. The boundaries of the district are Jefferson Street, third Avenue North, Taylor Street and Eight Avenue North. The area encompasses 18 city blocks. The architecture of the homes in the area includes Italianate architecture, Stick architecture, Eastlake architecture and Queen Anne style architecture.
