= Cemetery =

Place of burial

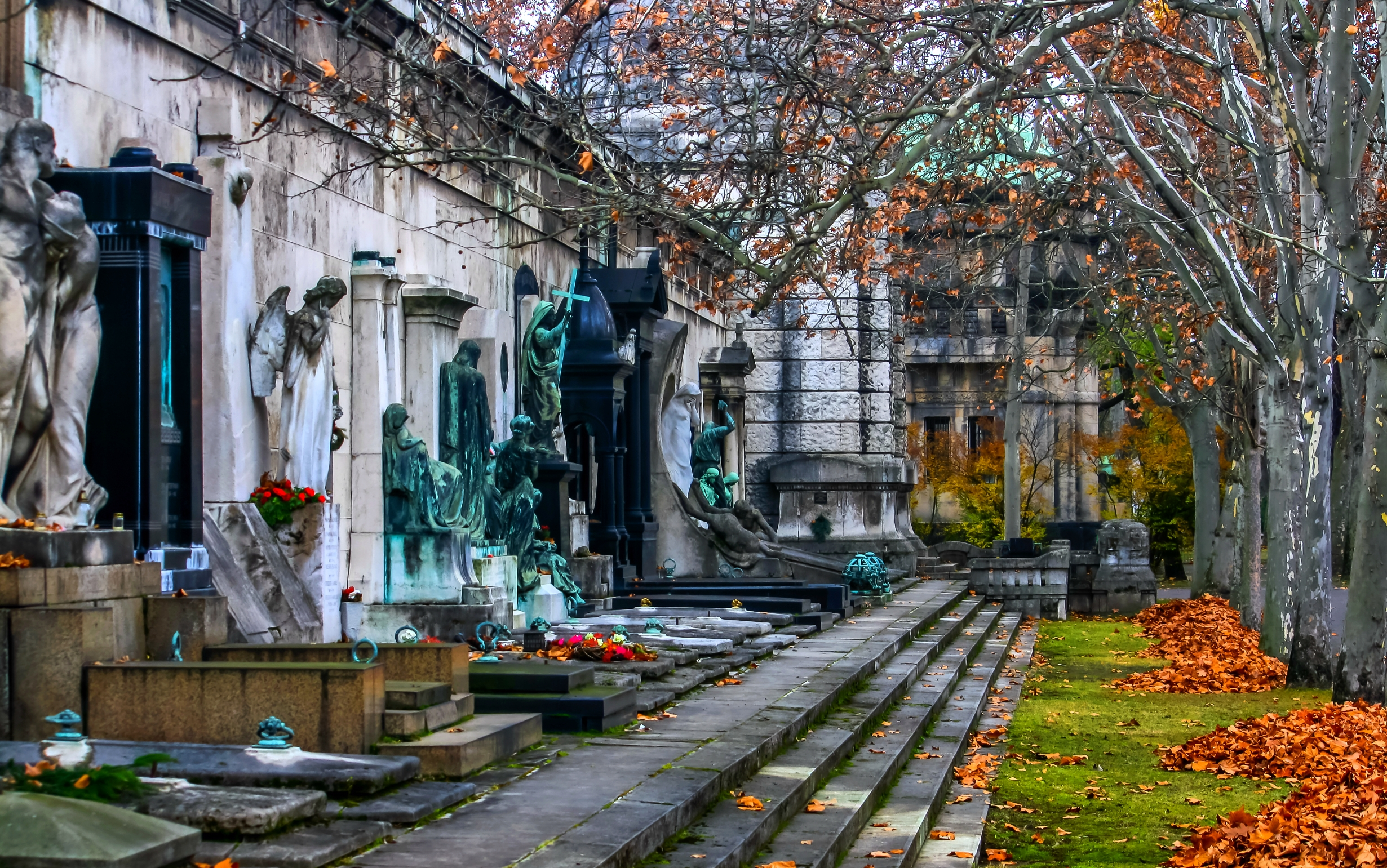
Kerepesi Cemetery in Budapest, Hungary

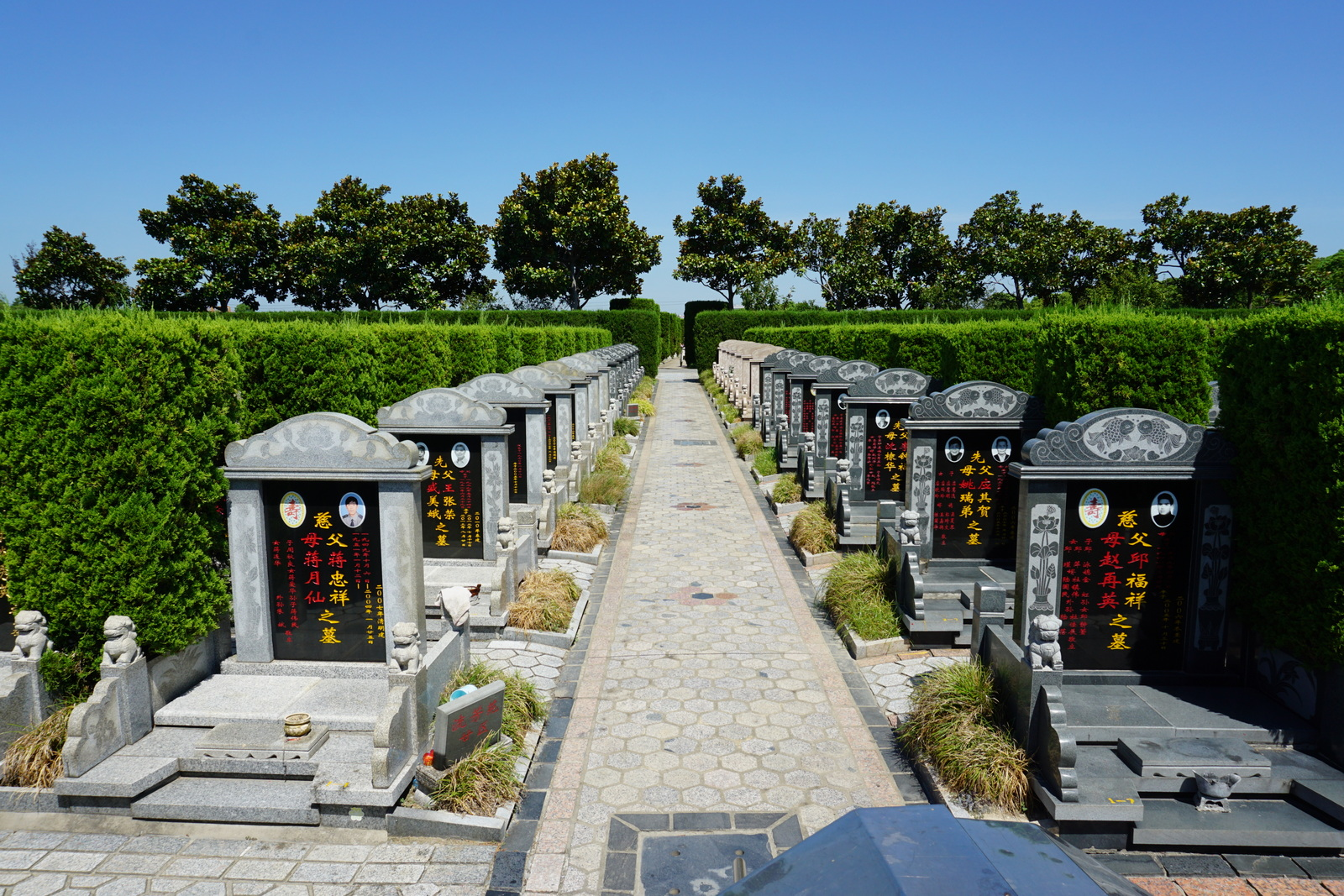
Cemetery in China

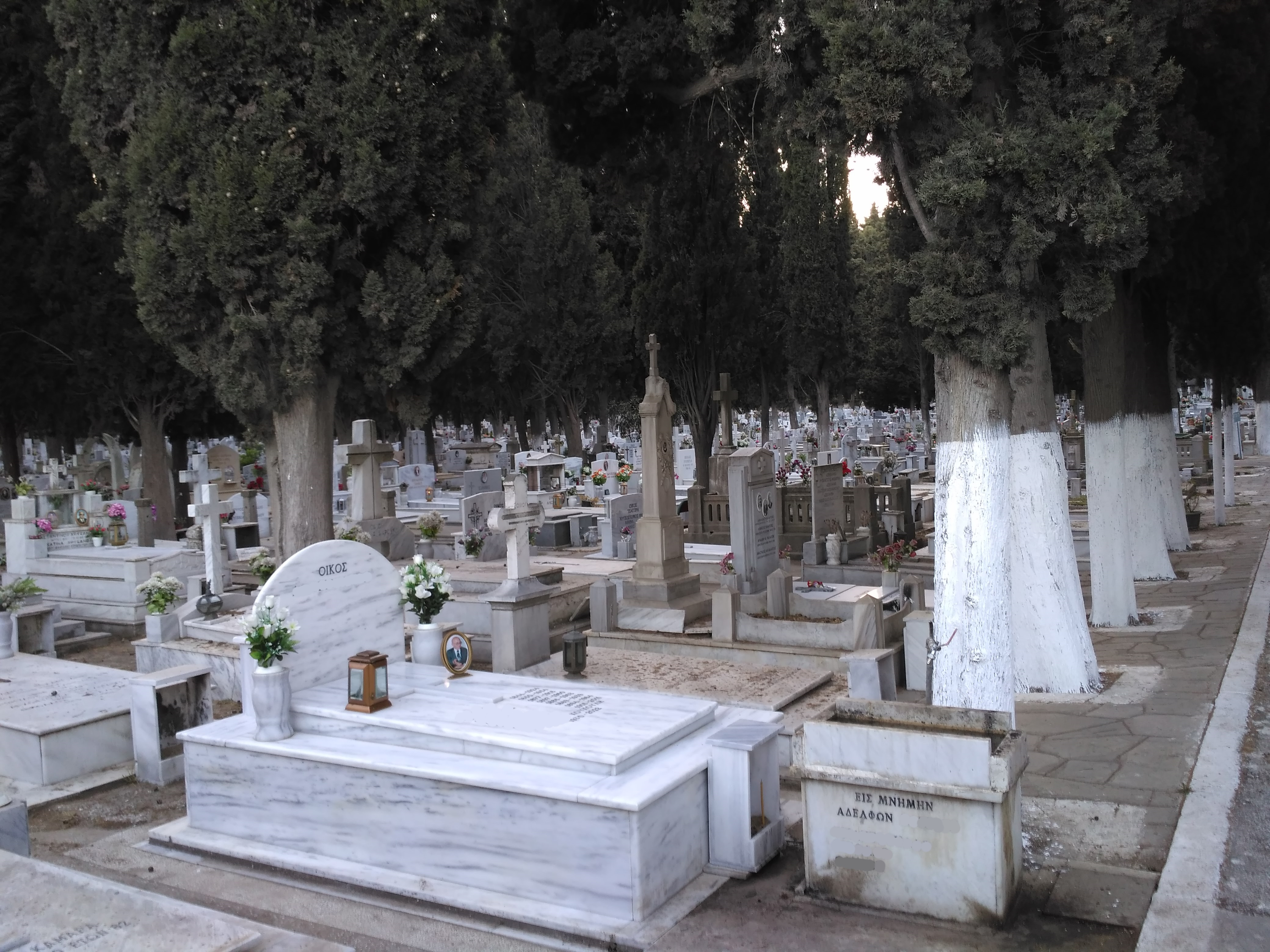
Cemetery in Kavala, Greece

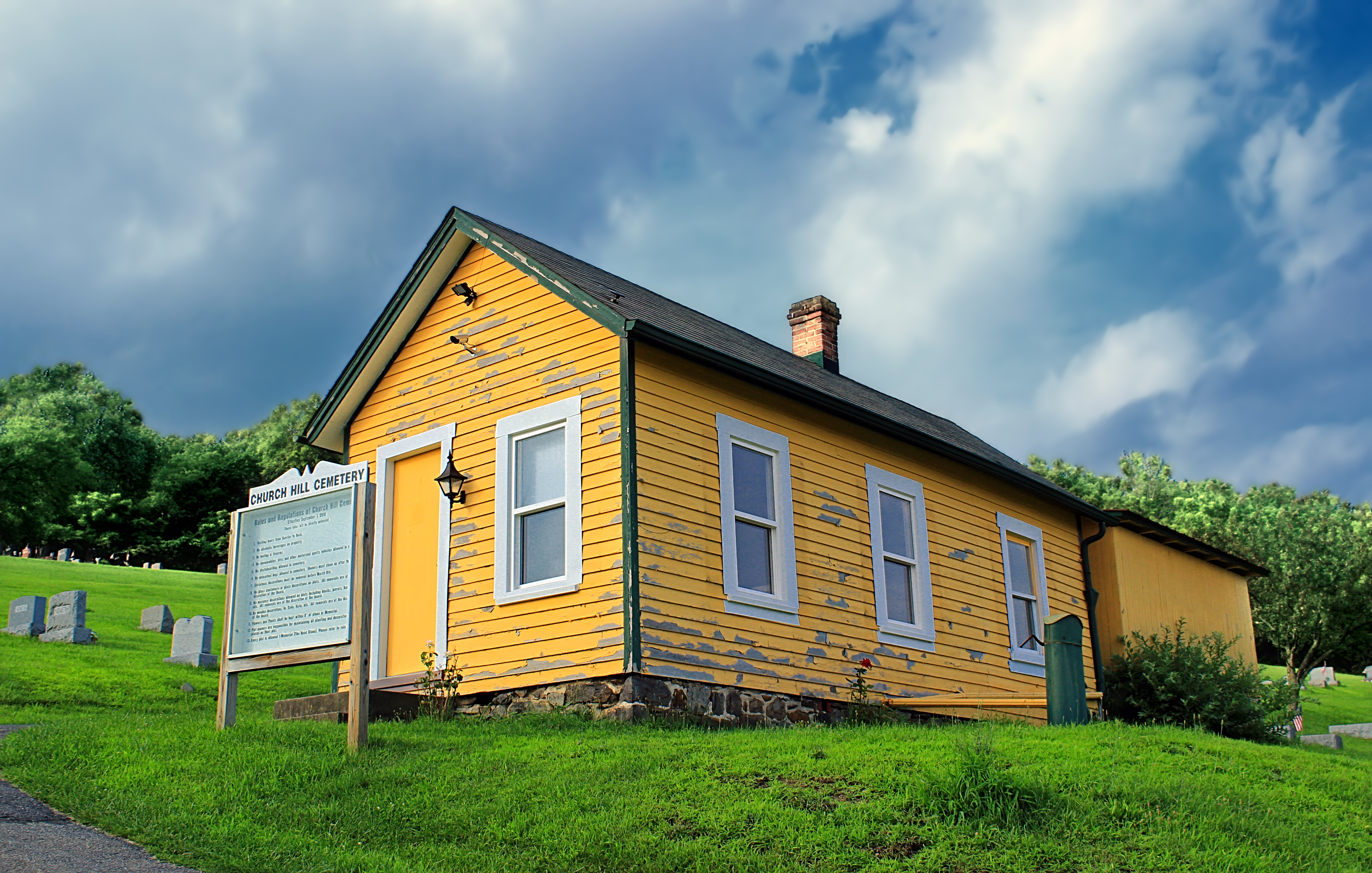
Church Hill Cemetery in Lower Mount Bethel Township, Pennsylvania, U.S.

A cemetery, burial ground, gravesite, or a green space called a memorial park or memorial garden, is a place where the remains of many dead people are buried or otherwise entombed. The word cemetery (from Greek κοιμητήριον 'sleeping place') implies that the land is specifically designated as a burial ground and originally applied to the Roman catacombs.

The intact or cremated remains of people may be interred in a grave, commonly referred to as burial, or in a tomb, an "above-ground grave" (resembling a sarcophagus), a mausoleum, a columbarium, a niche, or another edifice. In Western cultures, funeral ceremonies are often observed in cemeteries. These ceremonies or rites of passage differ according to cultural practices and religious beliefs. Modern cemeteries often include crematoria, and some grounds previously used for both continue as crematoria as a principal use long after the interment areas have been filled.

The word graveyard is often used interchangeably with cemetery, but a graveyard primarily refers to a burial ground within a churchyard.

== History ==
=== Palaeolithic ===
The Taforalt cave in Morocco is possibly the oldest known cemetery in the world. It was the resting place of at least 34 Iberomaurusian individuals, the bulk of whom have been dated to 15,100 to 14,000 years ago.

=== Neolithic ===
Neolithic cemeteries are sometimes referred to by the term "grave field". They are one of the chief sources of information on ancient and prehistoric cultures, and numerous archaeological cultures are defined by their burial customs, such as the Urnfield culture of the European Bronze Age.

=== Middle Ages ===
During the Early Middle Ages, the reopening of graves and manipulation of the corpses or artifacts contained within them was a widespread phenomenon and a common part of the life course of early medieval cemeteries across Western and Central Europe. The reopening of furnished or recent burials occurred over the broad zone of European row-grave-style furnished inhumation burial, especially from the 5th to the 8th centuries, which comprised the regions of today's Romania, Hungary, the Czech Republic, Slovakia, Switzerland, Austria, Germany, the Low Countries, France, and south-eastern England.

In the Western European cemeteries of the Early Middle Ages, one can observe a decline in the individualized commemorations that were characteristic of Roman funerary practices. According to the historian Philippe Ariès, funerary inscriptions that commemorated a deceased individual by marking their name, date of birth and death, profession, and family relationships became increasingly rare in Western Europe from the fifth century and had largely disappeared by the early medieval period. Not only individual commemorations, but indeed any form of written inscription declined significantly during this period, including on the graves of prominent individuals. Most tombs remained anonymous or bore only religious and abstract decoration.

=== Early Christianity ===
From about the 7th century, in Europe a burial was under the control of the Church and could only take place on consecrated church ground. Practices varied, but in continental Europe, bodies were usually buried in a mass grave until they had decomposed. The bones were then exhumed and stored in ossuaries, either along the arcaded bounding walls of the cemetery or within the church under floor slabs and behind walls.

In most cultures those who were vastly rich, had important professions, were part of the nobility or were of any other high social status were usually buried in individual crypts inside or beneath the relevant place of worship with an indication of their name, date of death and other biographical data. In Europe, this was often accompanied by a depiction of their coat of arms.

Most others were buried in graveyards again divided by social status. Mourners who could afford the work of a stonemason had a headstone engraved with a name, dates of birth and death and sometimes other biographical data, and set up over the place of burial. Usually, the more writing and symbols carved on the headstone, the more expensive it was. As with most other human property such as houses and means of transport, richer families used to compete for the artistic value of their family headstone in comparison to others around it, sometimes adding a statue (such as a weeping angel) on the top of the grave.

Those who could not pay for a headstone at all usually had some religious symbol made from wood on the place of burial such as a Christian cross; however, this would quickly deteriorate under the rain or snow. Some families hired a blacksmith and had large crosses made from various metals put on the places of burial.

=== Modernity ===
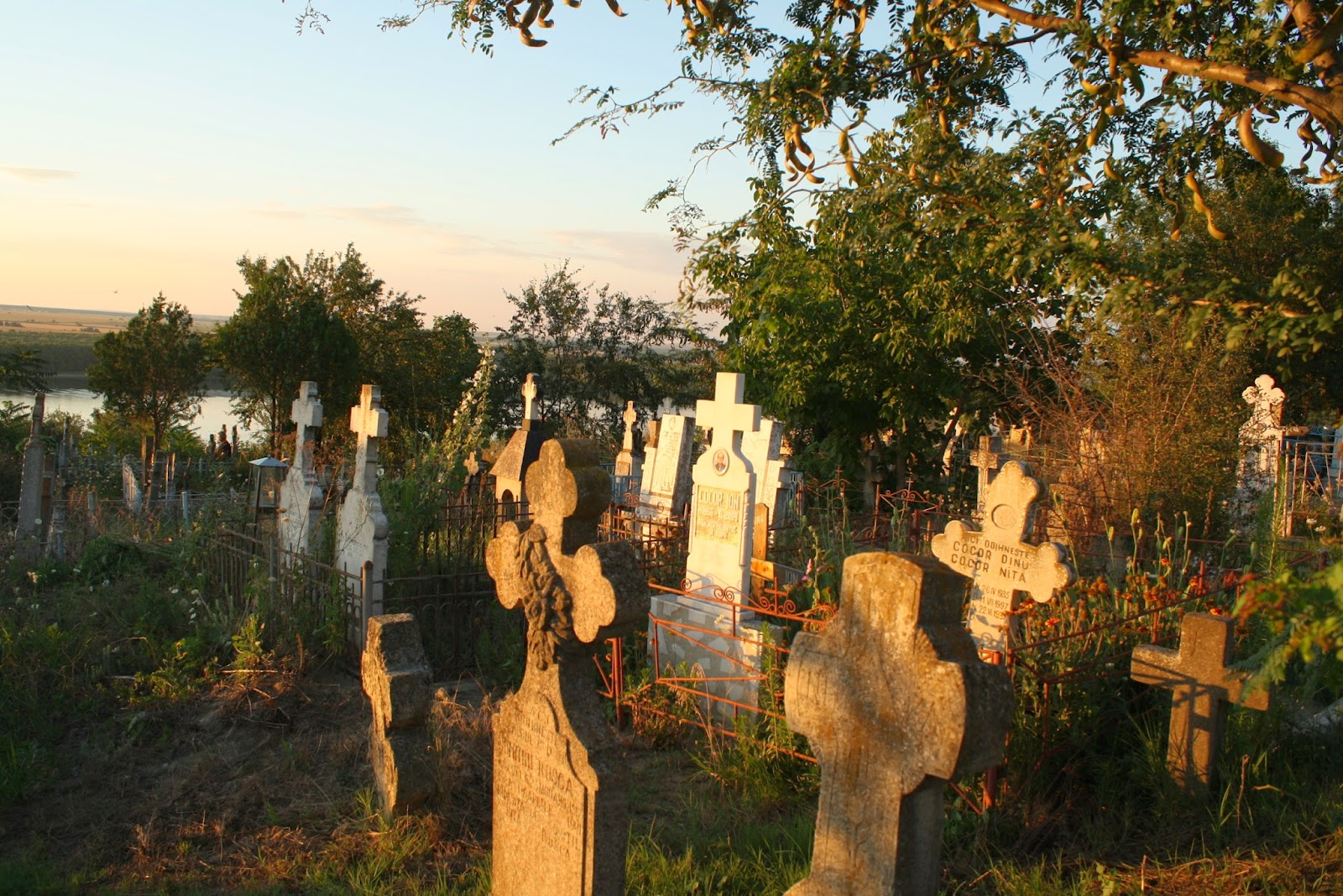
Cemetery overlooking the Danube, near Cernavodă, Romania

Starting in the early 19th century, the burial of the dead in graveyards began to be discontinued, due to rapid population growth in the early stages of the Industrial Revolution, continued outbreaks of infectious disease near graveyards and the increasingly limited space in graveyards for new interments. In many European states, burial in graveyards was eventually outlawed altogether through legislation.

Instead of graveyards, completely new places of burial were established away from heavily populated areas and outside of old towns and city centers. Many new cemeteries became municipally owned or were run by their own corporations, and thus independent from churches and their churchyards.

In some cases, skeletons were exhumed from graveyards and moved into ossuaries or catacombs. A large action of this type occurred in 18th century Paris when human remains were transferred from graveyards all over the city to the Catacombs of Paris. The bones of an estimated six million people are to be found there.

An early example of a landscape-style cemetery is Père Lachaise in Paris. This embodied the idea of state- rather than church-controlled burial, a concept that spread through the continent of Europe with the Napoleonic invasions. This could include the opening of cemeteries by private or joint stock companies. The shift to municipal cemeteries or those established by private companies was usually accompanied by the establishing of landscaped burial grounds outside the city (e.g. extramural).

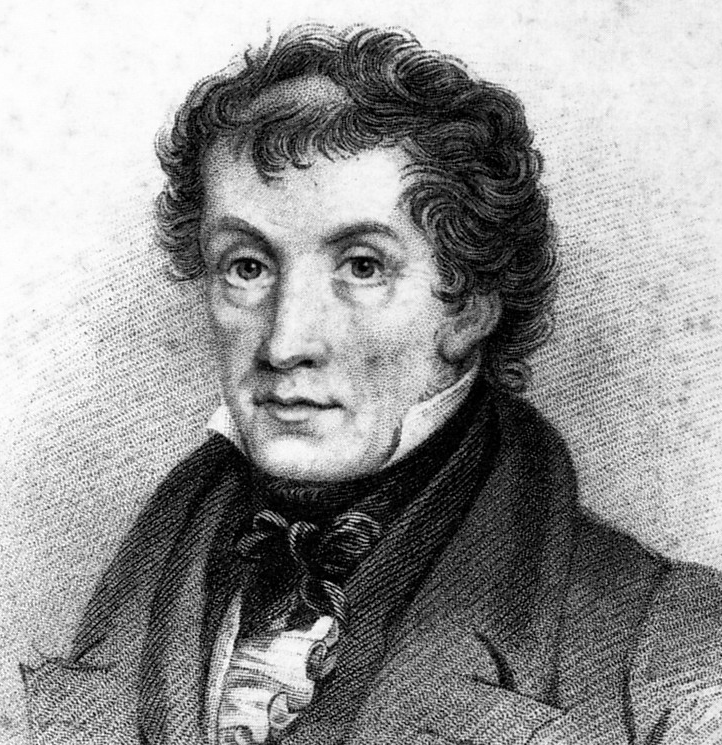
John Claudius Loudon, one of the first professional cemetery designers

In Britain the movement was driven by dissenters and public health concerns. The Rosary Cemetery in Norwich was opened in 1819 as a burial ground for all religious backgrounds. Similar private non-denominational cemeteries were established near industrialising towns with growing populations, such as Manchester (1821) and Liverpool (1825). Each cemetery required a separate Act of Parliament for authorisation, although the capital was raised through the formation of joint-stock companies.

In the first 50 years of the 19th century the population of London more than doubled from 1 million to 2.3 million. The small parish churchyards were rapidly becoming dangerously overcrowded, and decaying matter infiltrating the water supply was causing epidemics. The issue became particularly acute after the cholera epidemic of 1831, which killed 52,000 people in Britain alone, putting unprecedented pressure on the country's burial capacity. Concerns were also raised about the potential public health hazard arising from the inhalation of gases generated from human putrefaction under the then prevailing miasma theory of disease.

Legislative action was slow in coming, but in 1832 Parliament finally acknowledged the need for the establishment of large municipal cemeteries and encouraged their construction outside London. The same bill also closed all inner London churchyards to new deposits. The Magnificent Seven, seven large cemeteries around London, were established in the following decade, starting with Kensal Green in 1832.

Urban planner and author John Claudius Loudon was one of the first professional cemetery designers, and his book On the Laying Out, Planting and Managing of Cemeteries (1843) was very influential on designers and architects of the period. Loudon himself designed three cemeteries – Bath Abbey Cemetery, Histon Road Cemetery, Cambridge, and Southampton Old Cemetery.

The Metropolitan Burial Act 1852 legislated for the establishment of the first national system of government-funded municipal cemeteries across the country, opening the way for a massive expansion of burial facilities throughout the late 19th century.

In the United States, rural cemeteries became recreational areas in a time before public parks, hosting events from casual picnics to hunts and carriage races.

== Types ==
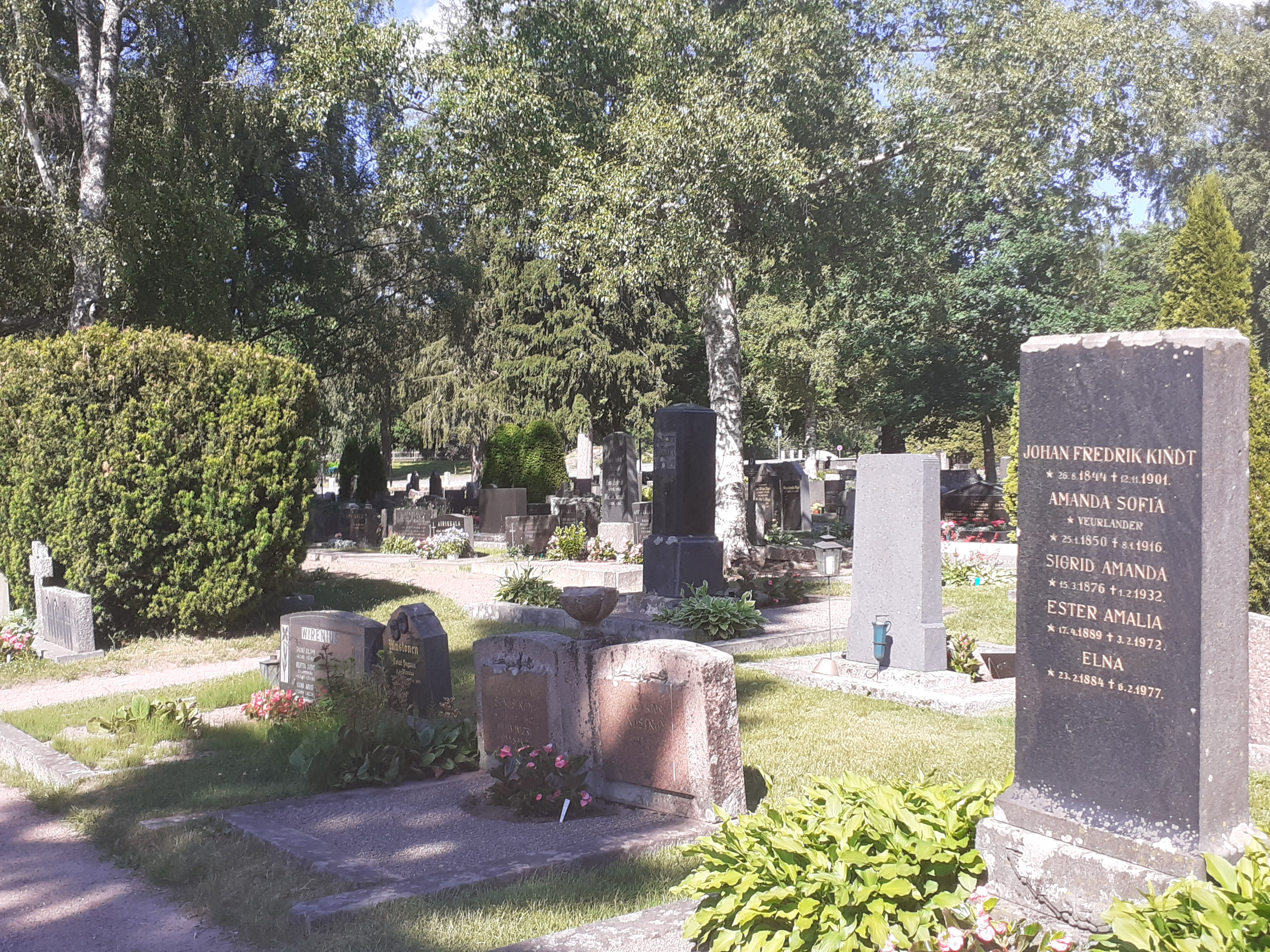
A cemetery in Nurmijärvi, Finland

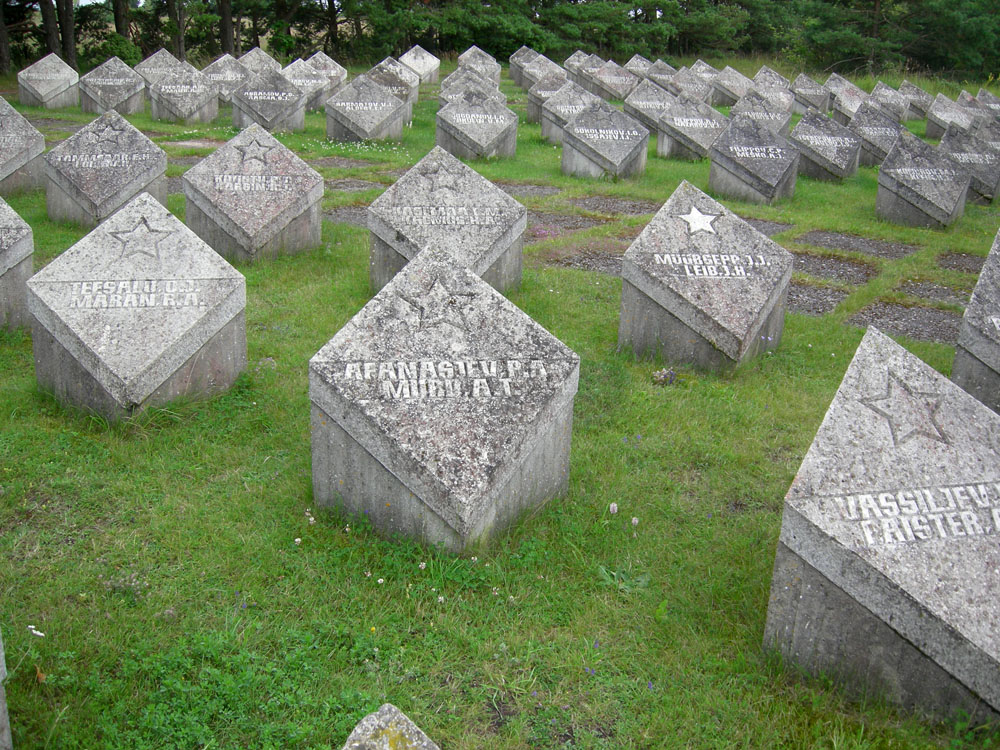
A Soviet military cemetery on the island of Saaremaa, Estonia

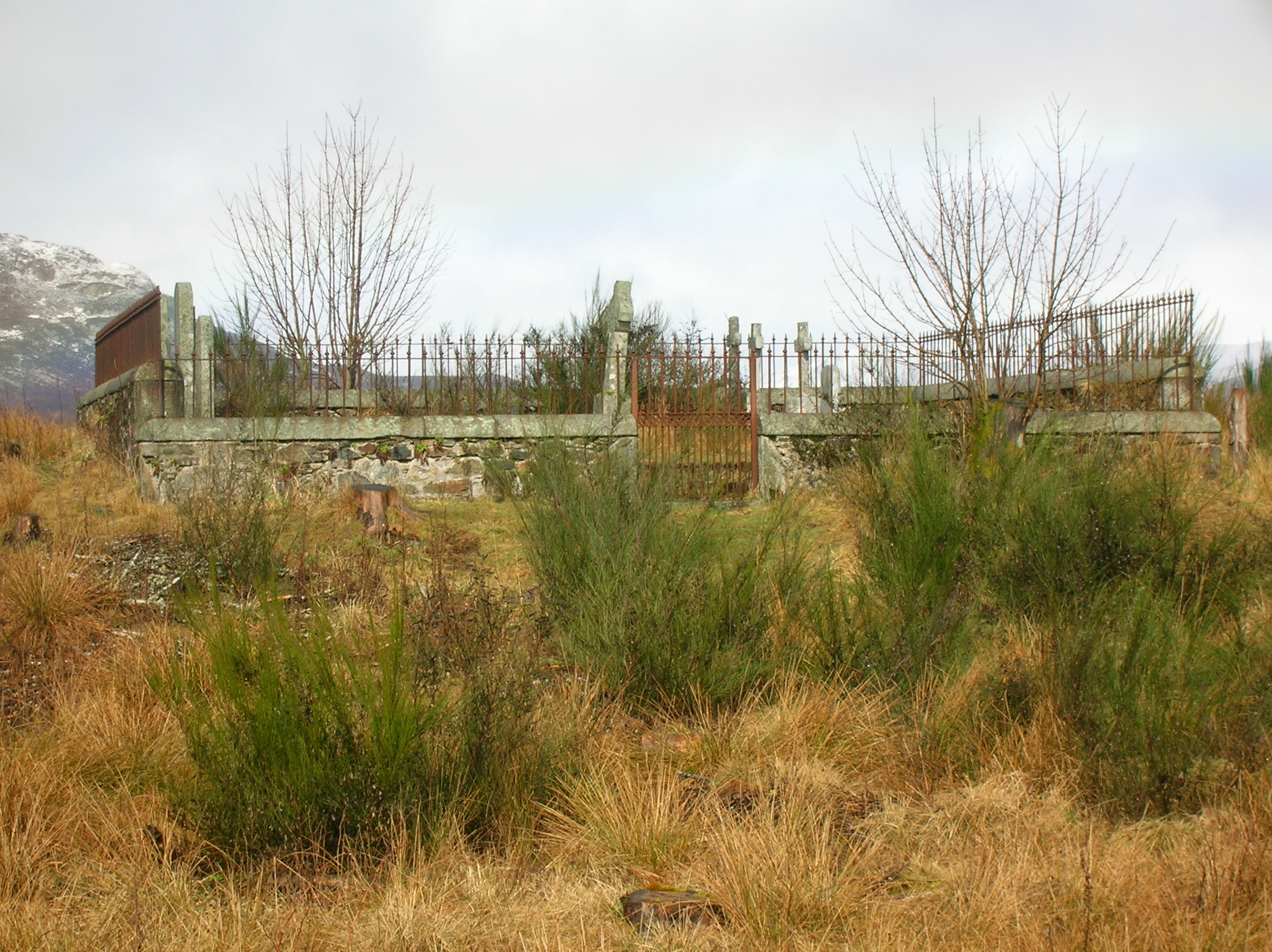
The Laird's traditional Scottish graveyard at Kindrogan House, Strathardle.

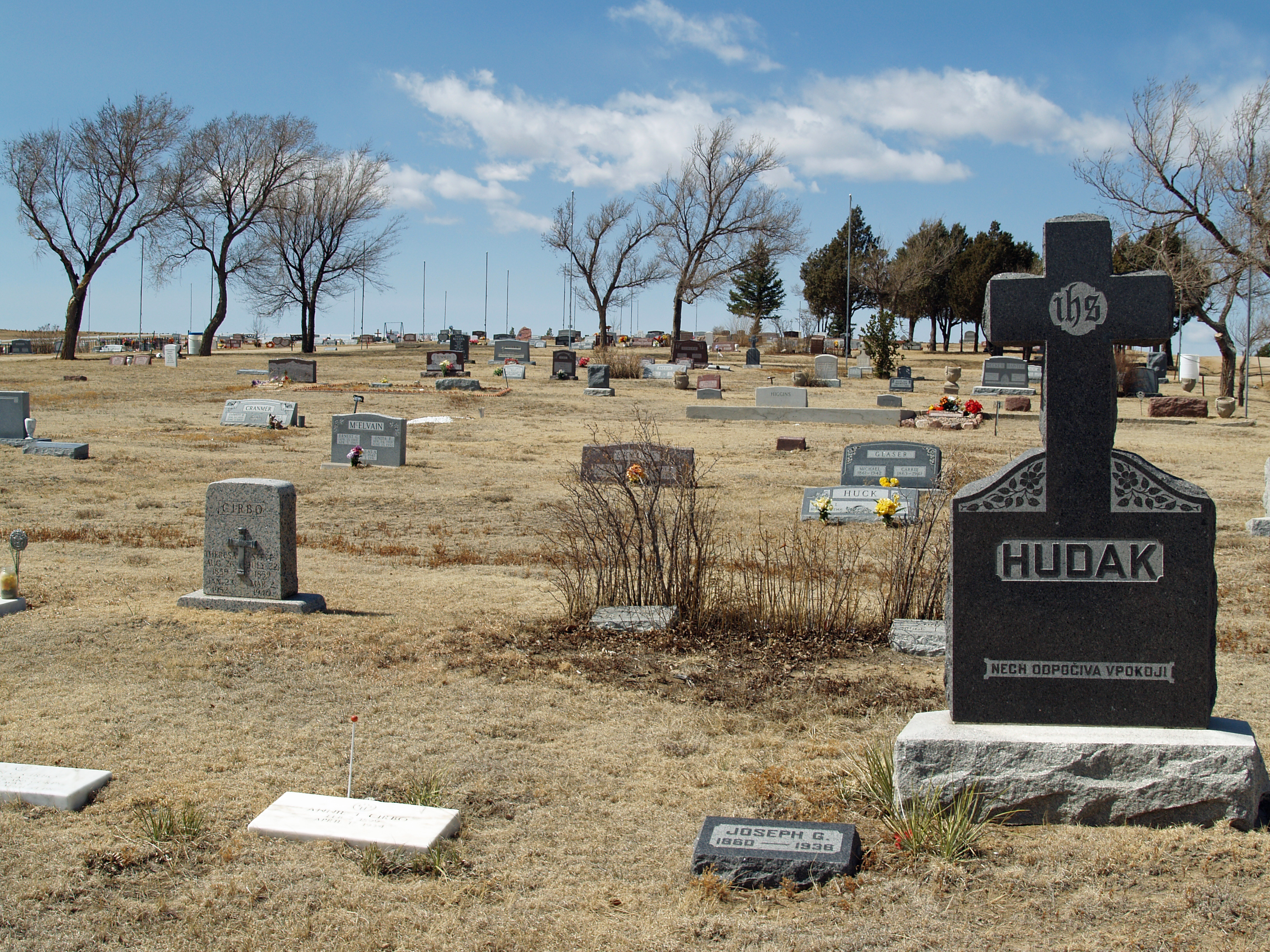
The town cemetery on the plains of Calhan, Colorado.

There are a number of different styles of cemetery in use. Many cemeteries have areas based on different styles, reflecting the diversity of cultural practices around death and how it changes over time.

=== Urban ===
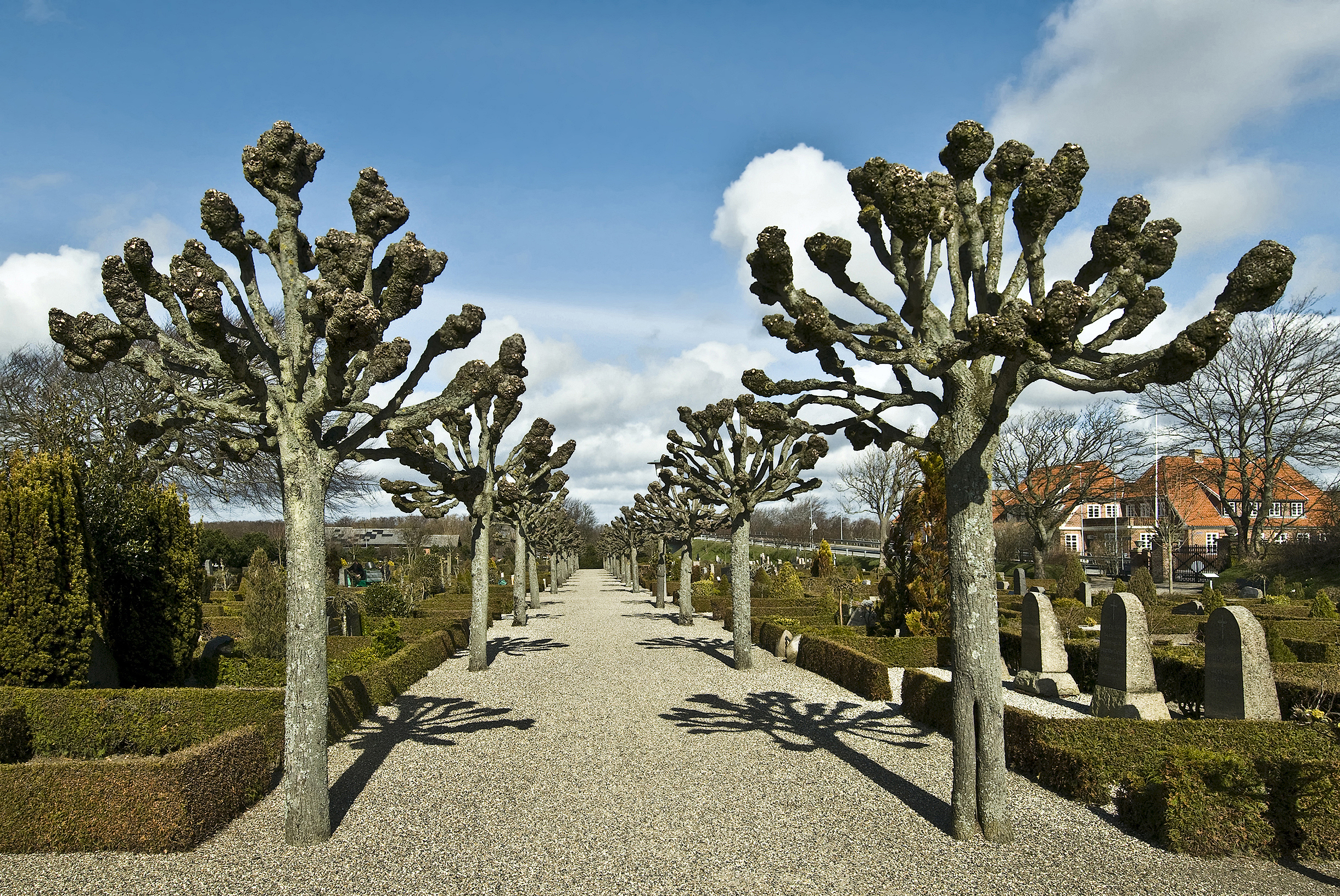
Avenue with linden in the cemetery by Ringkøbing, Jutland, Denmark

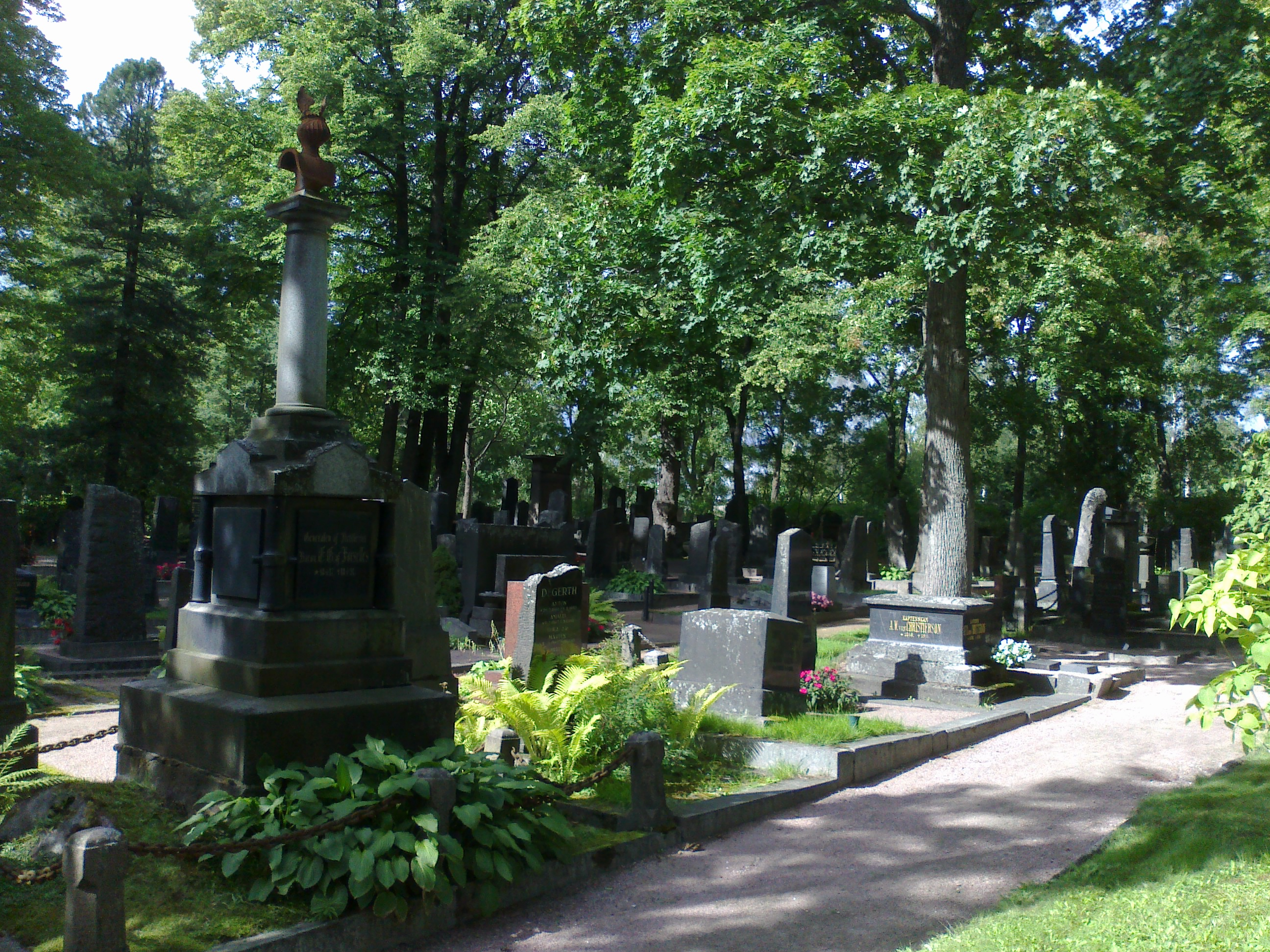
Graves at the Hietaniemi Cemetery in Helsinki, Uusimaa, Finland

The urban cemetery is a burial ground located in the interior of a village, town, or city. Early urban cemeteries were churchyards, which filled quickly and exhibited a haphazard placement of burial markers as sextons tried to squeeze new burials into the remaining space. As new burying grounds were established in urban areas to compensate, burial plots were often laid out in a grid to replace the chaotic appearance of the churchyard. Urban cemeteries developed over time into a more landscaped form as part of civic development of beliefs and institutions that sought to portray the city as civilized and harmonious.

Urban cemeteries were more sanitary (a place to safely dispose of decomposing corpses) than they were aesthetically pleasing. Corpses were usually buried wrapped in cloth, since coffins, burial vaults, and above-ground crypts inhibited the process of decomposition. Nonetheless, urban cemeteries which were heavily used were often very unhealthy. Receiving vaults and crypts often needed to be aired before entering, as decomposing corpses used up so much oxygen that even candles could not remain lit. The sheer stench from decomposing corpses, even when buried deeply, was overpowering in areas adjacent to the urban cemetery. Decomposition of the human body releases significant pathogenic bacteria, fungi, protozoa, and viruses which can cause disease and illness, and many urban cemeteries were located without consideration for local groundwater. Modern burials in urban cemeteries also release toxic chemicals associated with embalming, such as arsenic, formaldehyde, and mercury. Coffins and burial equipment can also release significant amounts of toxic chemicals such as arsenic (used to preserve coffin wood) and formaldehyde (used in varnishes and as a sealant) and toxic metals such as copper, lead, and zinc (from coffin handles and flanges).

Urban cemeteries relied heavily on the fact that the soft parts of the body would decompose in about 25 years (although, in moist soil, decomposition can take up to 70 years). If room for new burials was needed, older bones could be dug up and interred elsewhere (such as in an ossuary) to make space for new interments. It was not uncommon in some places, such as England, for fresher corpses to be chopped up to aid decomposition, and for bones to be burned to create fertilizer. The reuse of graves allowed for a steady stream of income, which enabled the cemetery to remain well-maintained and in good repair. Not all urban cemeteries engaged in reuse of graves, and cultural taboos often prevented it. Many urban cemeteries have fallen into disrepair and become overgrown, as they lacked endowments to fund perpetual care. Many urban cemeteries today are thus home to wildlife, birds, and plants which cannot be found anywhere else in the urban area, and many urban cemeteries in the late 20th century touted their role as an environmental refuge.

Many urban cemeteries are characterized by multiple burials in the same grave. Multiple burials is a consequence of the limited size of the urban cemetery, which cannot easily expand due to adjacent building development. It was not uncommon for an urban cemetery to begin adding soil to the top of the cemetery to create new burial space.

=== Monumental ===
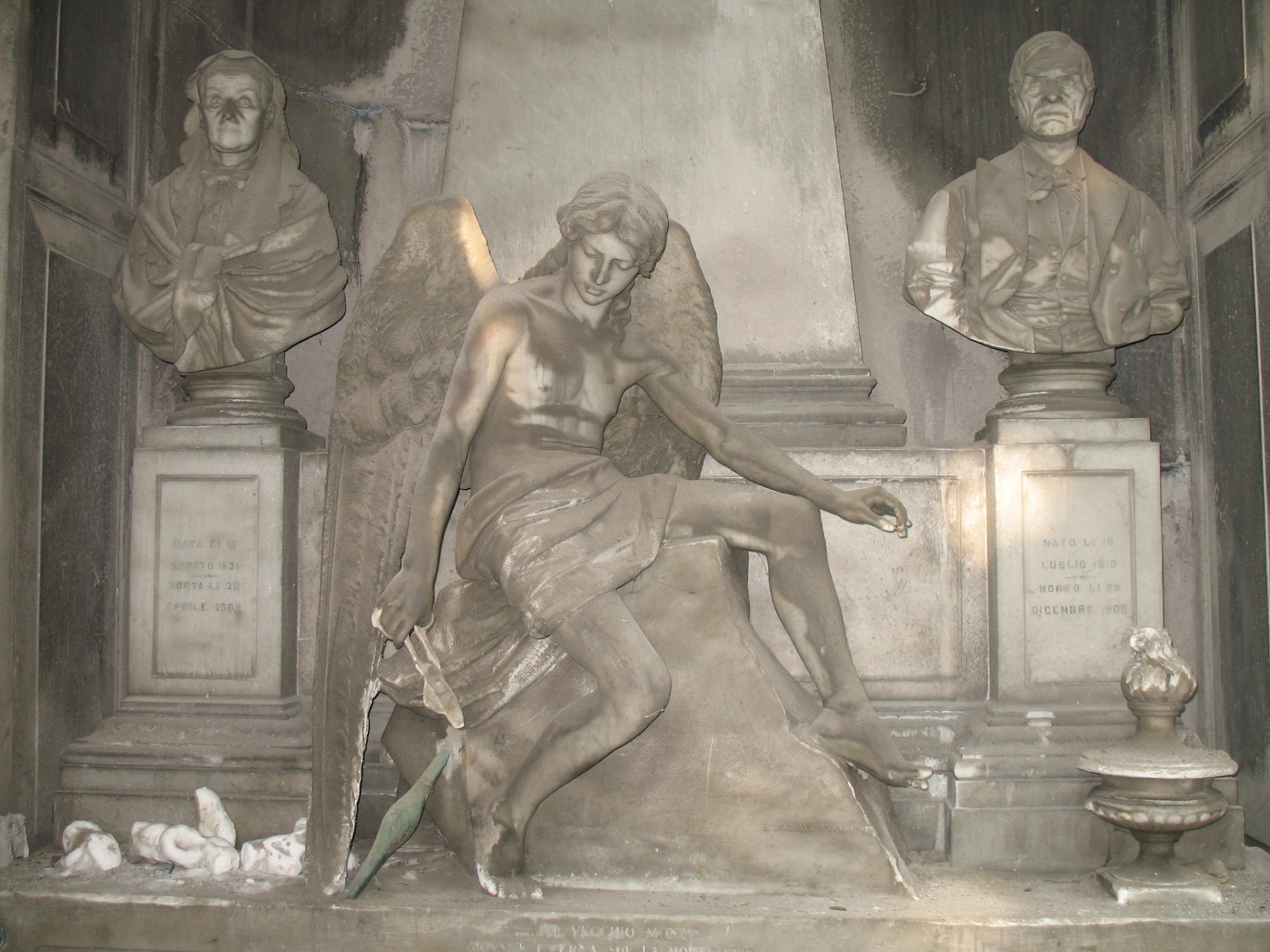
Monument of c. 1910 in the Monumental Cemetery of Staglieno in Genoa, Italy, one of the most spectacular of a number of Italian cemeteries featuring large-scale sculpture

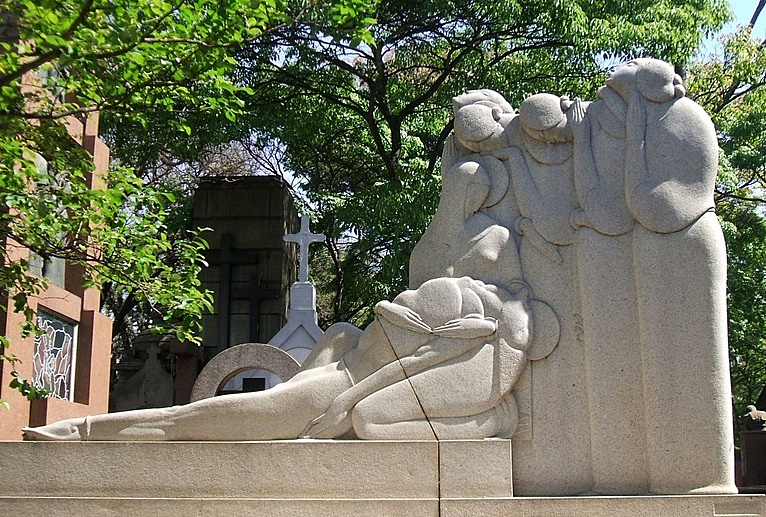
An artwork in a tomb by Victor Brecheret in Cemitério da Consolação, an example of monumental cemetery in São Paulo, Brazil

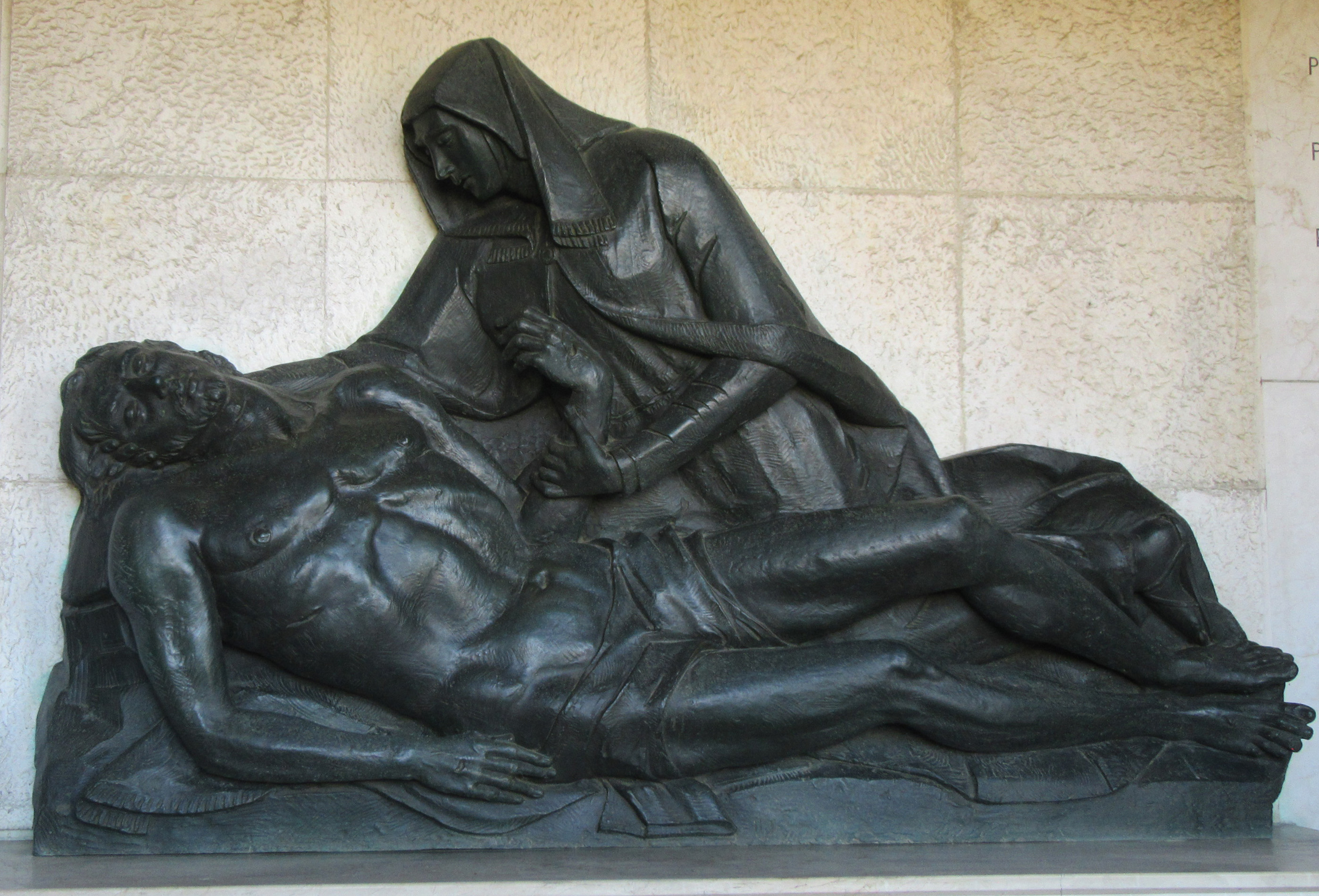
A bronze Pietà in Monumental Cemetery of Codogno, Italy

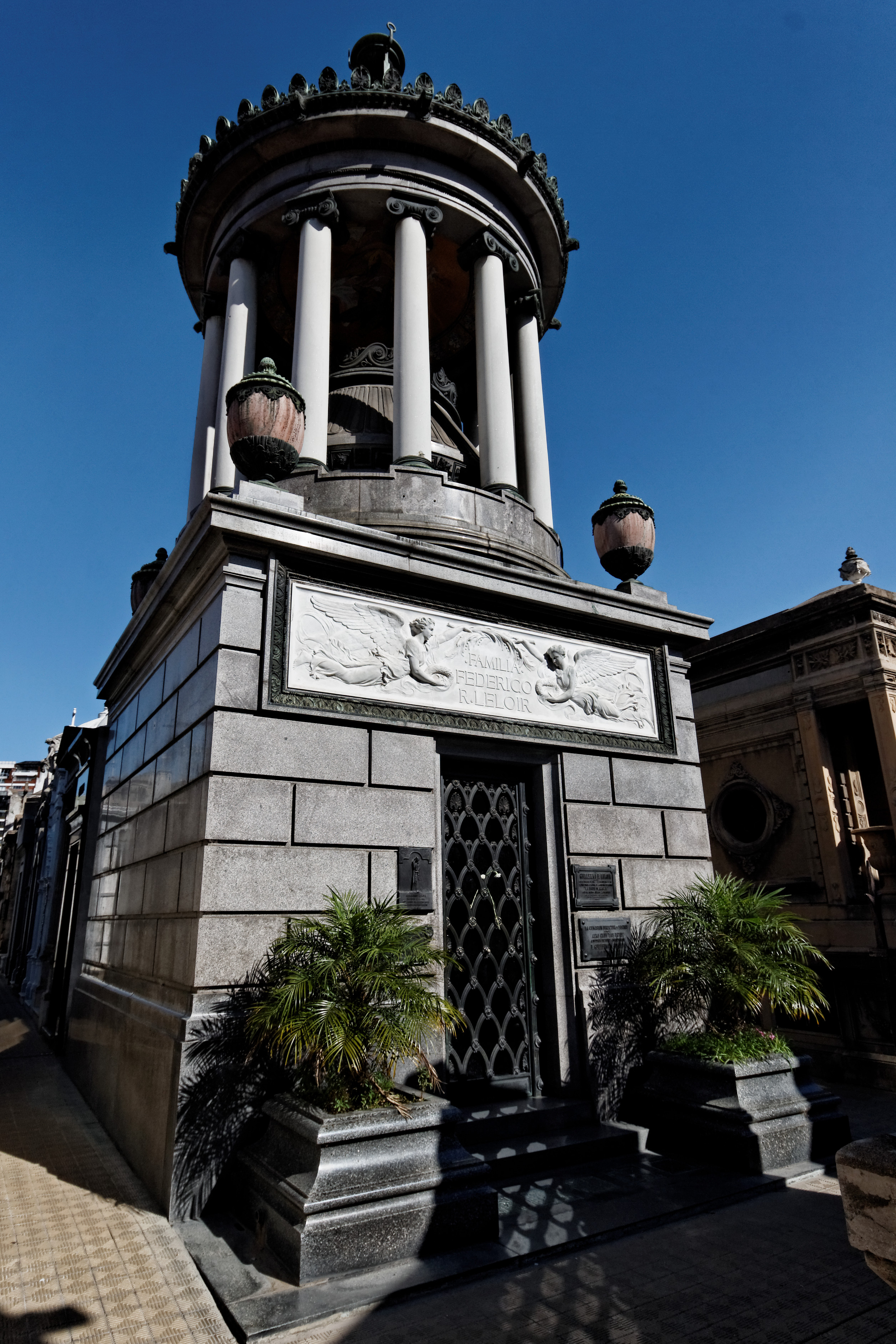
Mausoleum of Luis Federico Leloir in La Recoleta Cemetery in Buenos Aires, Argentina

A monumental cemetery is the traditional style of cemetery where headstones or other monuments made of marble, granite or similar materials rise vertically above the ground (typically around 50 cm but some can be over 2 metres high). Often the entire grave is covered by a slab, commonly concrete, but it can be more expensive materials such as marble or granite, and/or has its boundaries delimited by a fence which may be made of concrete, cast iron or timber. Where a number of family members are buried together (either vertically or horizontally), the slab or boundaries may encompass a number of graves.

Monumental cemeteries are often regarded as unsightly due to the random collection of monuments and headstones they contain. Also, as maintenance of the headstones is the responsibility of family members (in the absence of a proscribed Perpetual Care and Maintenance Fund), over time many headstones are forgotten about and decay and become damaged. For cemetery authorities, monumental cemeteries are difficult to maintain. While cemeteries often have grassed areas between graves, the layout of graves makes it difficult to use modern equipment such as ride-on lawn mowers in the cemetery. Often the maintenance of grass must be done by more labour-intensive (and therefore expensive) methods. In order to reduce the labour cost, devices such as string trimmers are increasingly used in cemetery maintenance, but such devices can damage the monuments and headstones. Cemetery authorities dislike the criticism they receive for the deteriorating condition of the headstones, arguing that they have no responsibility for the upkeep of headstones, and typically disregard their own maintenance practices as being one of the causes of that deterioration.

=== Rural or garden ===
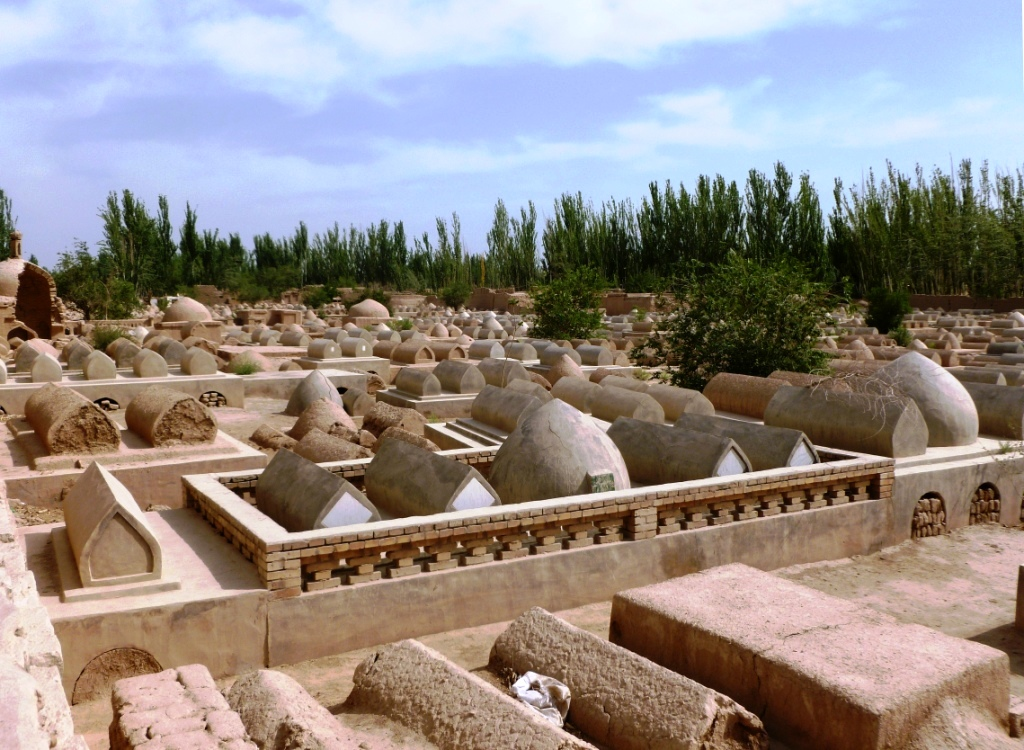
A Muslim cemetery in Kashgar, Xinjiang, China

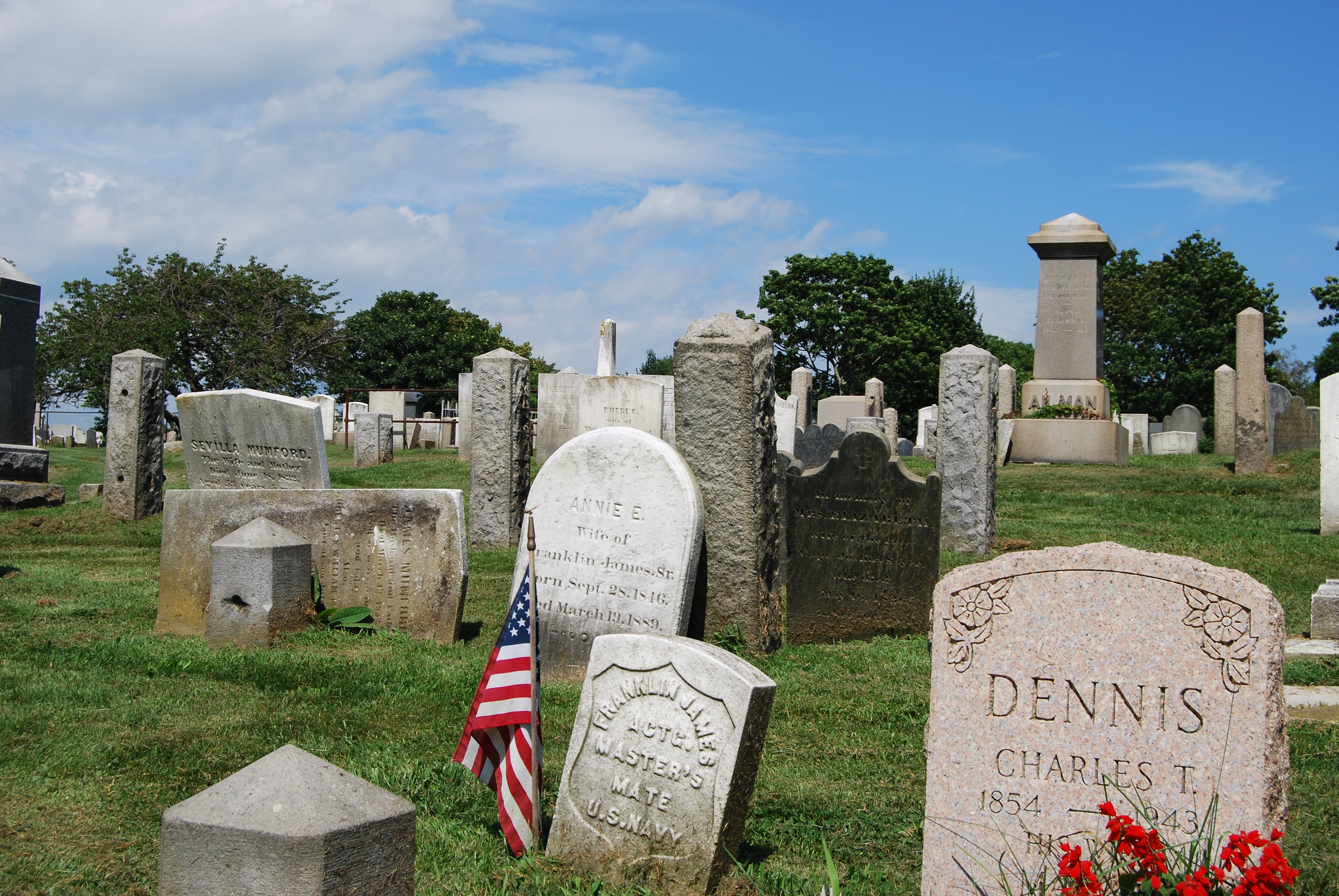
Common Burying Ground and Island Cemetery in Newport, Rhode Island

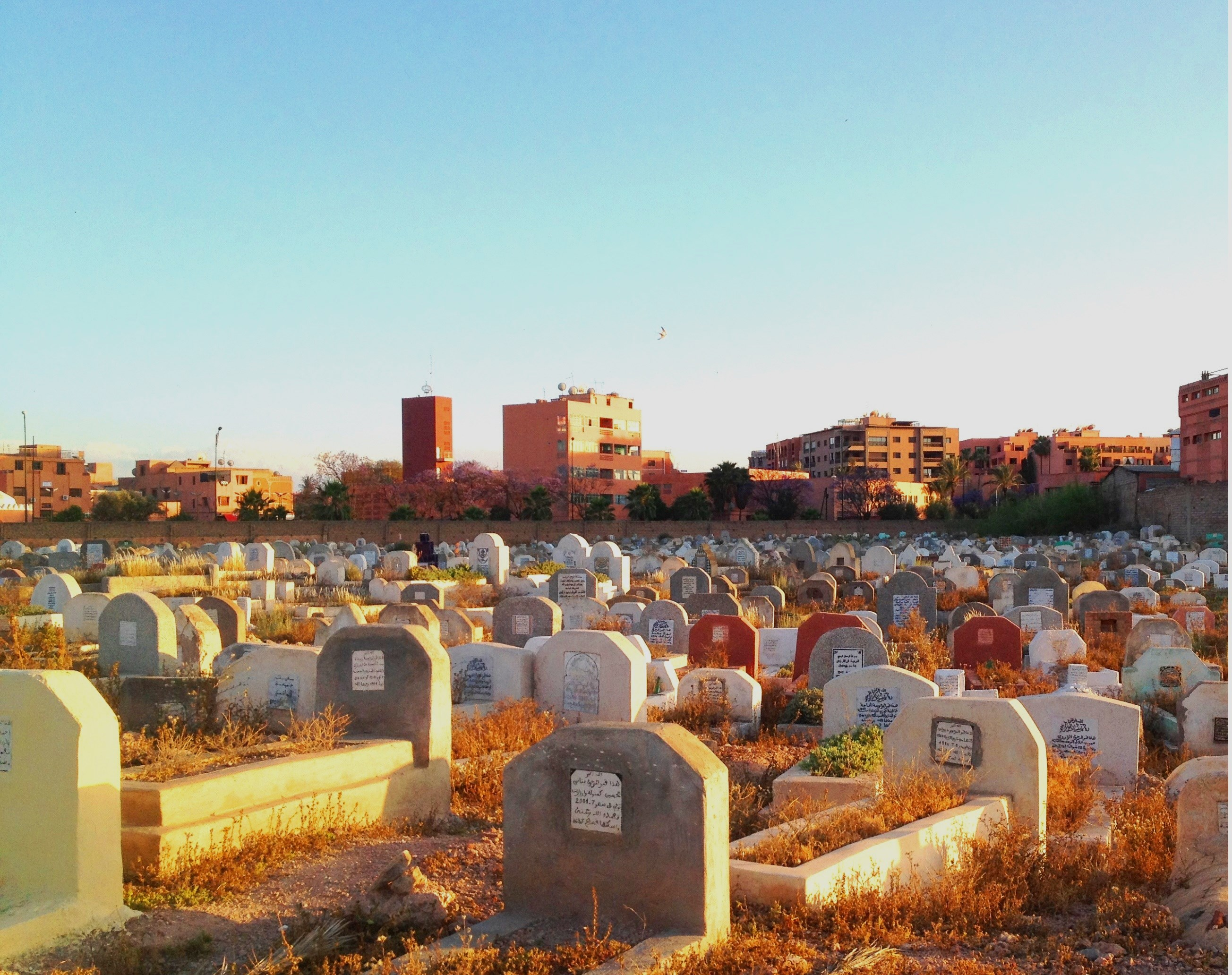
A Muslim cemetery at sunset in Marrakesh, Morocco

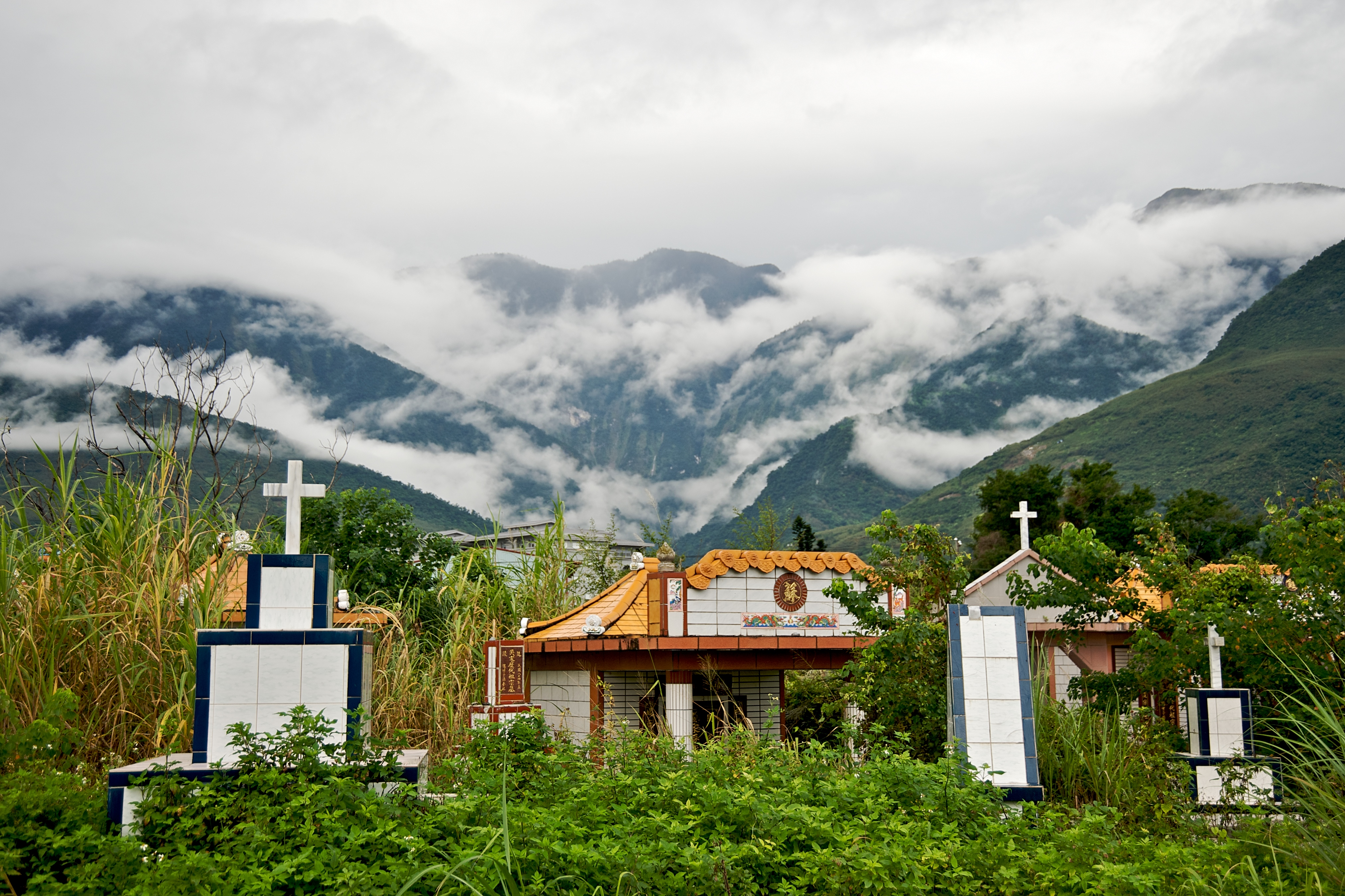
A roadside cemetery in Hualien, Taiwan

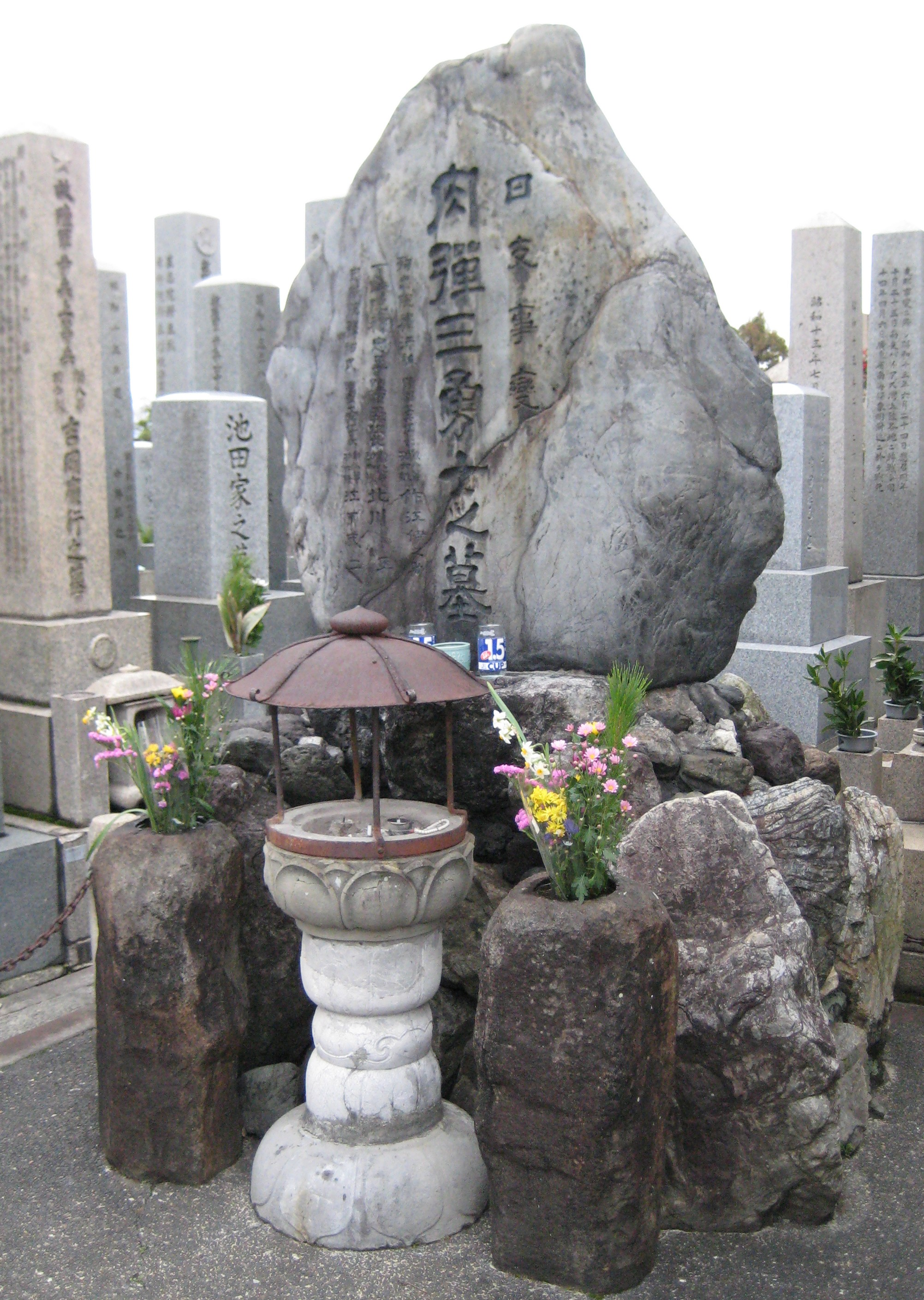
A cemetery in Kyoto, Japan

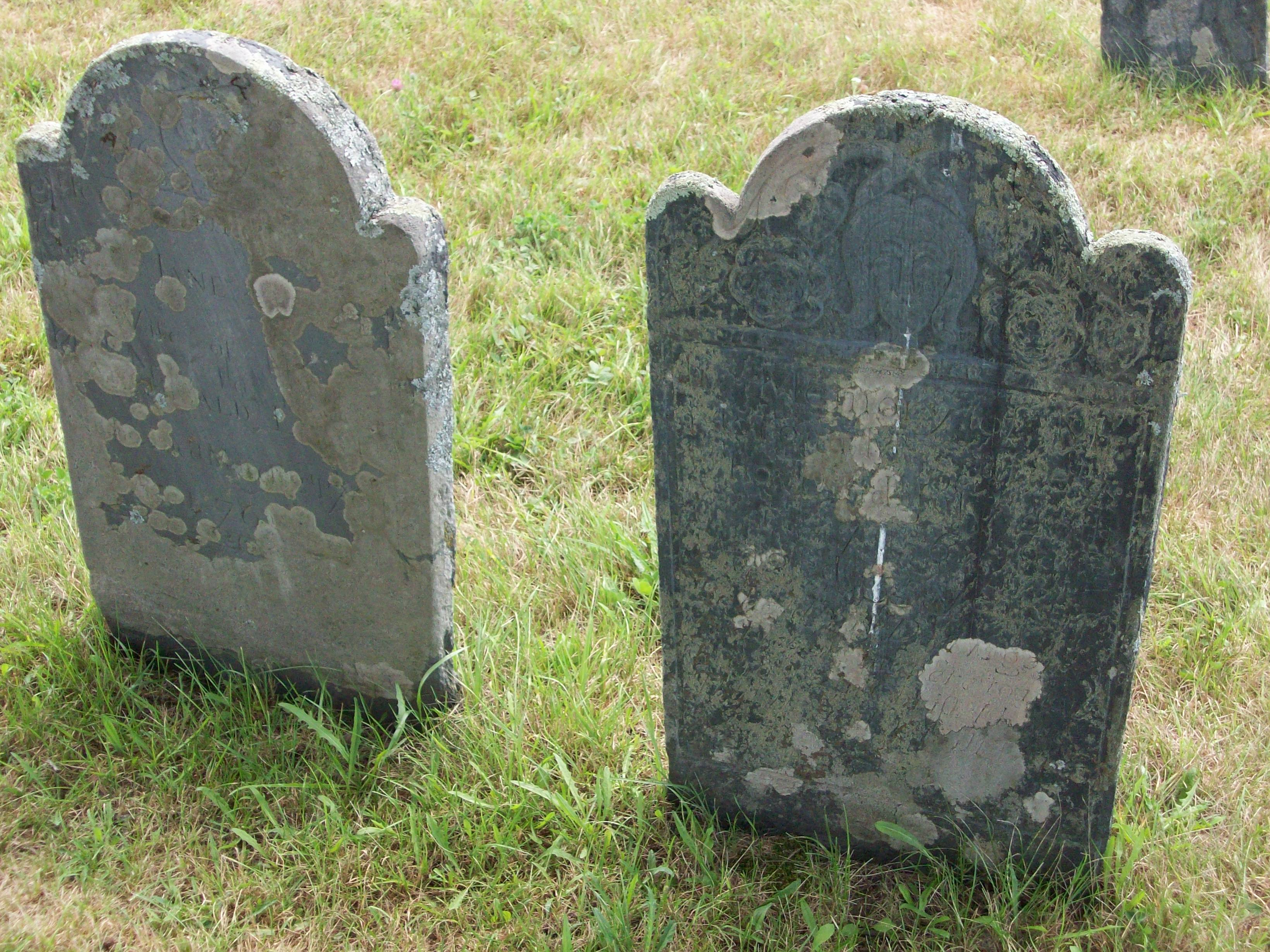
Two Colonial era graves in Pemaquid, Maine

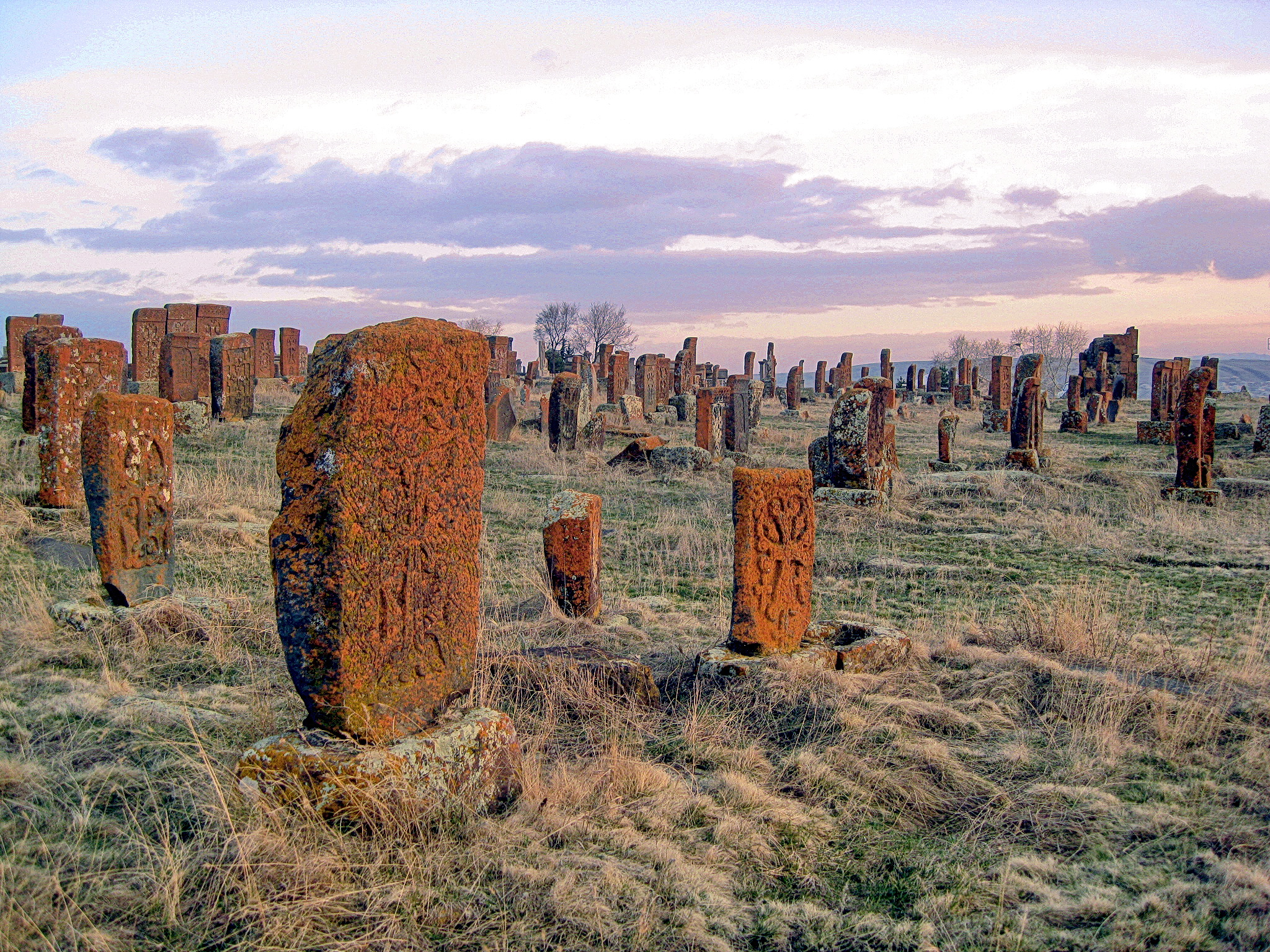
Noratus cemetery, a medieval cemetery in Armenia with a large number of early khachkars. The cemetery has the largest cluster of khachkars in the country.

The rural cemetery or garden cemetery is a style of burial ground that uses landscaping in a park-like setting. It was conceived in 1711 by the British architect Sir Christopher Wren, who advocated the creation of landscaped burial grounds which featured well-planned walkways which gave extensive access to graves and planned plantings of trees, bushes, and flowers. Wren's idea was not immediately accepted. But by the early 1800s, existing churchyards were growing overcrowded and unhealthy, with graves stacked upon each other or emptied and reused for new burials. As a reaction to this, the first "garden" cemetery – Père Lachaise Cemetery in Paris – opened in 1804. Because these cemeteries were usually on the outskirts of town (where land was plentiful and cheap), they were called "rural cemeteries", a term still used to describe them today. The concept quickly spread across Europe.

Merry Cemetery in Romania

Garden/rural cemeteries were not necessarily outside city limits. When land within a city could be found, the cemetery was enclosed with a wall to give it a garden-like quality. These cemeteries were often not sectarian, nor co-located with a house of worship. Inspired by the English landscape garden movement, they often looked like attractive parks. The first garden/rural cemetery in the United States was Mount Auburn Cemetery near Boston, Massachusetts, founded by the Massachusetts Horticultural Society in 1831. Following the establishment of Mount Auburn, dozens of other "rural" cemeteries were established in the United States – perhaps in part because of Supreme Court Justice Joseph Story's dedication address – and there were dozens of dedication addresses, including the famous Gettysburg Address of President Abraham Lincoln.

The cost of building a garden/rural cemetery often meant that only the wealthy could afford burial there. Subsequently, garden/rural cemeteries often feature above-ground monuments and memorials, mausoleums, and columbaria. The excessive filling of rural/garden cemeteries with elaborate above-ground memorials, many of dubious artistic quality or taste, created a backlash which led to the development of the lawn cemetery.

=== Lawn cemetery ===
In a review of British burial and death practises, Julie Rugg wrote that there were "four closely interlinked factors that explain the 'invention' and widespread adoption of the lawn cemetery: the deterioration of the Victorian cemetery; a self-conscious rejection of Victorian aesthetics in favour of modern alternatives; resource difficulties that, particularly after World War II, increasingly constrained what might be achieved in terms of cemetery maintenance; and growing professionalism in the field of cemetery management."

Typically, lawn cemeteries comprise a number of graves in a lawn setting with trees and gardens on the perimeter. Adolph Strauch introduced this style in 1855 in Cincinnati. While aesthetic appeal to family members has been the primary driver for the development of lawn cemeteries, cemetery authorities initially welcomed this new style of cemetery enthusiastically, expecting easier maintenance. Selecting (or grading) the land intended for a lawn cemetery so that it is completely flat allows the use of large efficient mowers (such as ride-on mowers or lawn tractors) - the plaques (being horizontally set in the ground) lie below the level of the blades and are not damaged by the blades. In practice, while families are often initially attracted to the uncluttered appearance of a lawn cemetery, the common practice of placing flowers (sometimes in vases) and increasingly other items (e.g. small toys on children's graves) reintroduces some clutter to the cemetery and makes it difficult to use the larger mowers. While cemetery authorities increasingly impose restrictions on the nature and type of objects that can be placed on lawn graves and actively remove prohibited items, grieving families are often unwilling to comply with these restrictions and become very upset if the items are removed. Another problem with lawn cemeteries involves grass over-growth over time: the grass can grow over and cover the plaque, to the distress of families who can no longer easily locate the grave. Grasses that propagate by an above-ground stolon (runner) can cover a plaque very quickly. Grasses that propagate by a below-ground rhizome tend not to cover the plaque as easily.

==== Lawn beam ====
The lawn beam cemetery, a recent development, seeks to solve the problems of the lawn cemetery while retaining many of its benefits. Low (10–15 cm) raised concrete slabs (beams) are placed across the cemetery. Commemorative plaques (usually standardised in terms of size and materials similar to lawn cemeteries) stand on these beams adjacent to each grave. As in a lawn cemetery, grass grows over the graves themselves. The areas between the beams are wide enough to permit easy mowing with a larger mower. As the mower blades are set lower than the top of the beam and the mowers do not go over the beam, the blades cannot damage the plaques. Up on the beam, the plaques cannot be easily overgrown by grass, and spaces between the plaques permit families to place flowers and other objects out of reach of the mowing.

=== Natural ===
A natural cemetery, eco-cemetery, green cemetery or conservation cemetery, is a new style of cemetery as an area set aside for natural burials (with or without coffins). Natural burials are motivated by a desire to be environmentally conscious with the body rapidly decomposing and becoming part of the natural environment without incurring the environmental cost of traditional burials. Certifications may be granted for various levels of green burial. Green burial certifications are issued in a tiered system reflecting level of natural burial practice. Green burial certification standards designate a cemetery as Hybrid, Natural, or Conservation Burial Grounds.

Many scientists have argued that natural burials would be a highly efficient use of land if designed specifically to save endangered habitats, ecosystems and species.

The opposite has also been proposed. Instead of letting natural burials permanently protect wild landscapes, others have argued that the rapid decomposition of a natural burial, in principle, allows for the quick reuse of grave sites in comparison with conventional burials. However, it is unclear if reusing cemetery land will be culturally acceptable to most people.

In keeping with the intention of "returning to nature" and the early reuse potential, natural cemeteries do not normally have conventional grave markings such as headstones. Instead, exact GPS recordings and or the placing of a tree, bush or rock often marks the location of the dead, so grieving family and friends can visit the precise location of a grave.

=== Columbarium wall ===
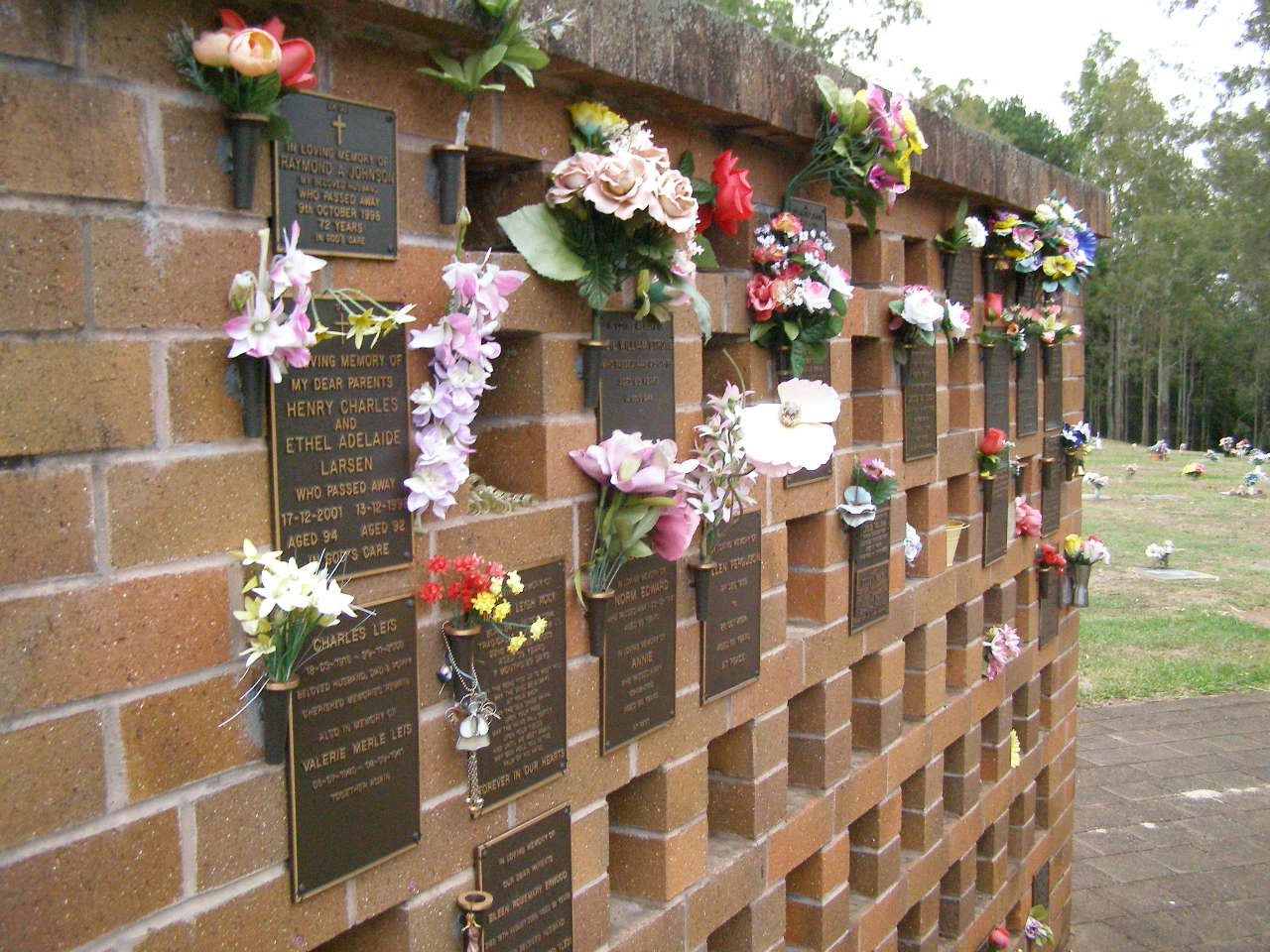
A columbarium wall at Lawnton, Queensland, showing empty niches, plaques, and flower holders

Columbarium walls are a common feature of many cemeteries, reflecting the increasing use of cremation rather than burial. While cremated remains can be kept at home by families in urns or scattered in some significant or attractive place, neither of these approaches allows for a long-lasting commemorative plaque to honour the dead nor provide a place for the wider circle of friends and family to come to mourn or visit. Therefore, many cemeteries now provide walls (typically of brick or rendered brick construction) with a rectangular array of niches, with each niche being big enough to accommodate a person's cremated remains. Columbarium walls are a very space-efficient use of land in a cemetery compared with burials and a niche in a columbarium wall is a much cheaper alternative to a burial plot. A small plaque (about 15 cm x 10 cm) can be affixed across the front of each niche and is generally included as part of the price of a niche. As the writing on the plaques has to be fairly small to fit on the small size of the plaque, the design of columbarium walls is constrained by the ability of visitors to read the plaques. Thus, the niches are typically placed between 1 metre to 2 metres above the ground so the plaques can be easily read by an adult. Some columbarium walls have niches going close to ground level, but these niches are usually unpopular with families as it is difficult to read the plaque without bending down very low (something older people in particular find difficult or uncomfortable to do).

As with graves, the niches may be assigned by the cemetery authorities or families may choose from the unoccupied niches available. It is usually possible to purchase (or pay a deposit) to reserve the use of adjacent niches for other family members. The use of adjacent niches (vertically or horizontally) usually permits a larger plaque spanning all the niches involved, which provides more space for the writing. As with graves, there may be separate columbarium walls for different religions or for war veterans. As with lawn cemeteries, the original expectation was that people would prefer the uncluttered simplicity of a wall of plaques, but the practice of leaving flowers is very entrenched. Mourners leave flowers (and other objects) on top of columbarium walls or at the base, as close as they can to the plaque of their family member. In some cases, it is possible to squeeze a piece of wire or string under the plaque allowing a flower or small posy to be placed on the plaque itself or clips are glued onto the plaque for that purpose. Newer designs of columbarium walls take this desire to leave flowers into account by incorporating a metal clip or loop beside each plaque, typically designed to hold a single flower stem or a small posy. As the flowers decay, they simply fall to the ground and do not create a significant maintenance problem.

=== Family ===
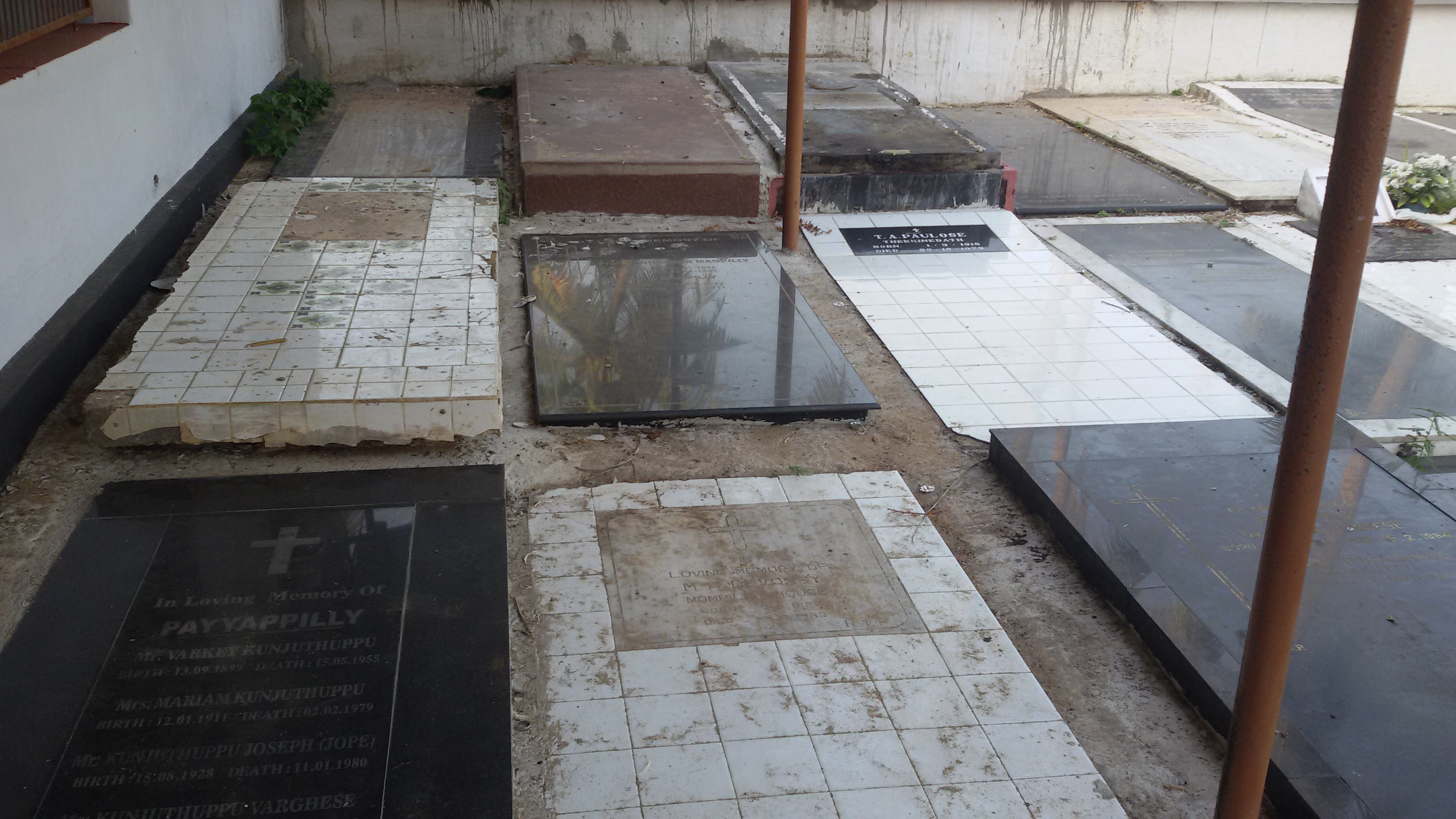
Family cemeteries in India

While uncommon today, family (or private) cemeteries were a matter of practicality during the settlement of America. If a municipal or religious cemetery had not been established, settlers would seek out a small plot of land, often in wooded areas bordering their fields, to begin a family plot. Sometimes, several families would arrange to bury their dead together. While some of these sites later grew into true cemeteries, many were forgotten after a family moved away or died out.

Today, it is not unheard of to discover groupings of tombstones, ranging from a few to a dozen or more, on undeveloped land. As late 20th-century suburban sprawl pressured the pace of development in formerly rural areas, it became increasingly common for larger exurban properties to be encumbered by "religious easements", which are legal requirements for the property owner to permit periodic maintenance of small burial plots located on the property but technically not owned with it. Often, cemeteries are relocated to accommodate building. However, if the cemetery is not relocated, descendants of people buried there may visit the cemetery.

There is also the practice of families with large estates choosing to create private cemeteries in the form of burial sites, monuments, crypts, or mausoleums on their property; the mausoleum at Fallingwater is an example of this practice. Burial of a body at a site may protect the location from redevelopment, with such estates often being placed in the care of a trust or foundation. In the United States, state regulations have made it increasingly difficult, if not impossible, to start private cemeteries; many require a plan to care for the site in perpetuity. Private cemeteries are nearly always forbidden on incorporated residential zones. Many people will bury a beloved pet on the family property.

=== Arabian tribal ===
All of the Saudis in Al Baha are Muslims, and this is reflected in their cemetery and funeral customs. "The southern tribal hinterland of Baha – home to especially the Al-Ghamdi and Al-Zahrani tribes – has been renowned for centuries for their tribal cemeteries that are now slowly vanishing", according to the Asharq Al-Awsat newspaper: "One old villager explained how tribal cemeteries came about. 'People used to die in large numbers and very rapidly one after the other because of diseases. So the villagers would dig graves close by burying members of the same family in one area. That was how the family and tribal burial grounds came about... If the family ran out of space, they would open old graves where family members had been buried before and add more people to them.

This process is known as khashf. During famines and outbreaks of epidemics huge numbers of people would die and many tribes faced difficulties in digging new graves because of the difficult weather. In the past, some Arab winters lasted for more than six months and would be accompanied with much rain and fog, impeding movement. But due to tribal rivalries many families would guard their cemeteries and put restrictions on who was buried in them. Across Baha, burial grounds have been constructed in different ways. Some cemeteries consist of underground vaults or concrete burial chambers with the capacity of holding many bodies simultaneously. Such vaults include windows for people to peer through and are usually decorated ornately with text, drawings, and patterns. At least one resident believes that the graves unique in the region because many are not oriented toward Mecca, and therefore must pre-date Islam.

=== Terraced ===
Graves are terraced in Yagoto Cemetery, which is an urban cemetery situated in a hilly area in Nagoya, Japan, effectively creating stone walls blanketing hillsides.

=== Miscellaneous ===
The Cross Bones is a burial ground for prostitutes in London. The Neptune Memorial Reef is an underwater columbarium near Key Biscayne.

=== Online memorials ===
In the 2000s and 2010s, it has become increasingly common for cemeteries and funeral homes to offer online services. There are also stand-alone online "cemeteries" such as DiscoverEverAfter Find a Grave, Canadian Headstones, Interment.net, and the World Wide Cemetery.

== Customs and practices ==
=== Flowers ===
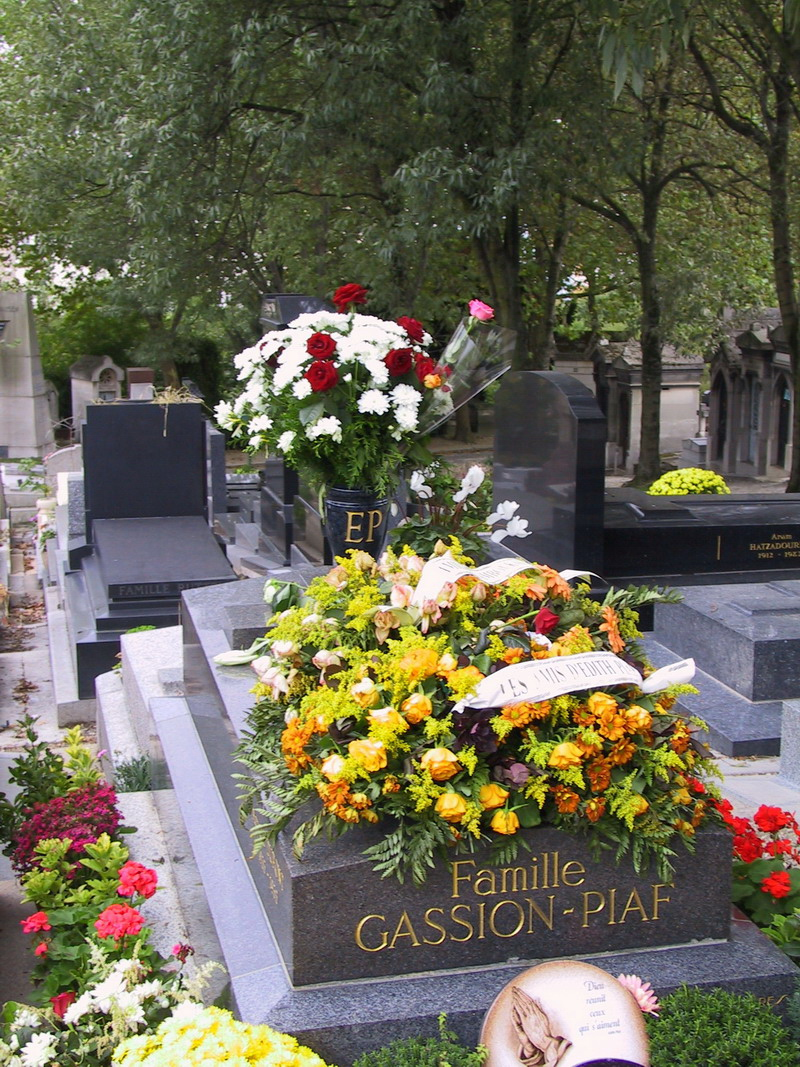
Flowers left on the grave of Édith Piaf

In Western countries, and many others, visitors to graves commonly leave cut flowers, especially during major holidays and on birthdays or relevant anniversaries. Cemeteries usually dispose of these flowers after a few weeks in order to keep the space maintained. Some companies offer perpetual flower services, to ensure a grave is always decorated with fresh flowers. Flowers may often be planted on the grave as well, usually immediately in front of the gravestone. For this purpose roses are highly common.

In some regions flowers are put out at specific times called Decoration Days.

=== Stones ===
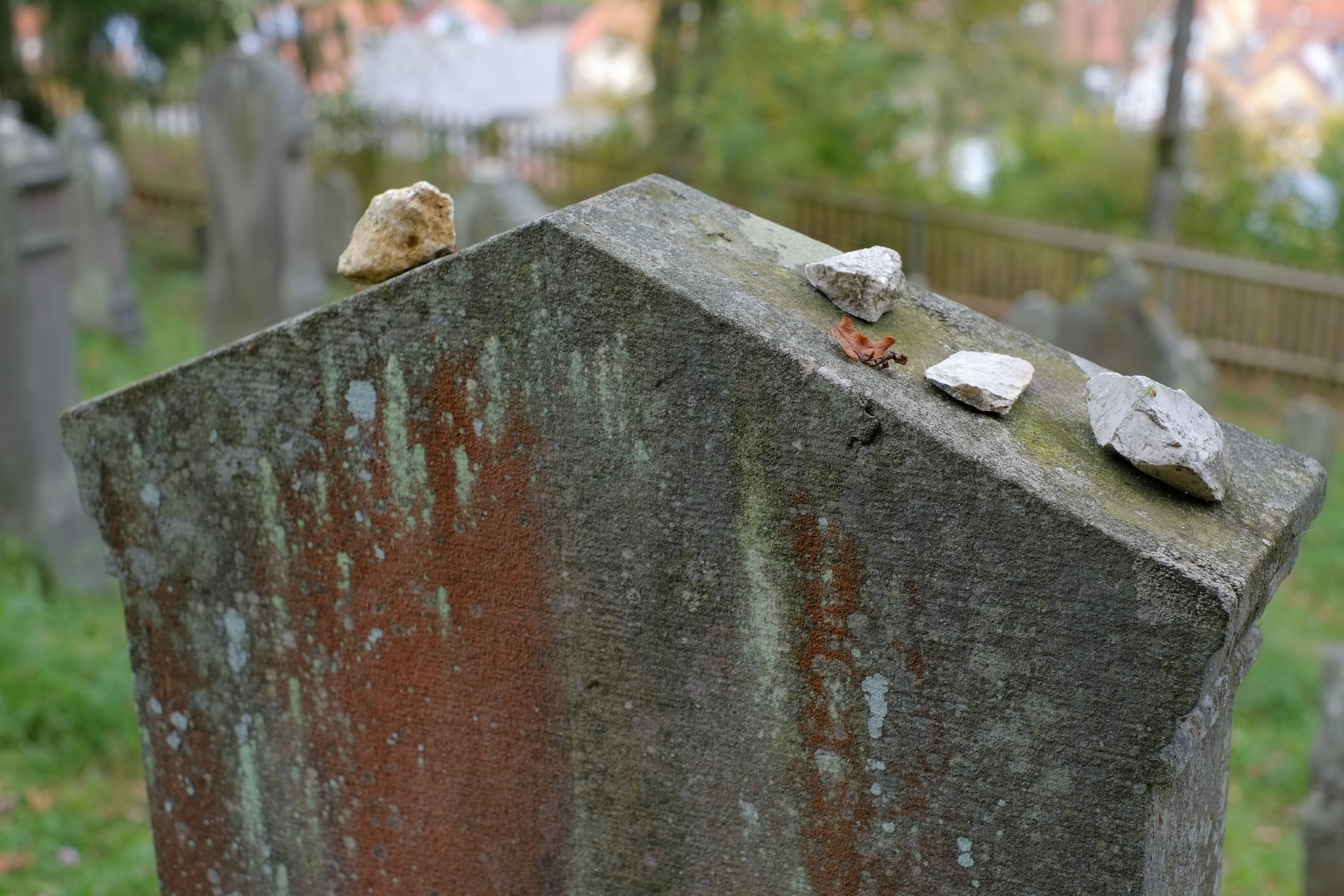
Small stones on a gravestone in a Jewish cemetery in Germany

Visitors to loved ones interred in Jewish cemeteries often leave a small stone on the top of the headstone. There are prayers said at the gravesite, and the stone is left on the visitor's departure. It is done as a show of respect; as a general rule, flowers are not placed at Jewish graves. Flowers are fleeting; the symbology inherent in the use of a stone is to show that the love, honor, memories, and soul of the loved one are eternal. This practice is seen in the closing scene of the film Schindler's List, although in that case it is not on a Jewish grave.

=== Crosses ===
War graves will commonly have small timber remembrance crosses left with a red poppy attached to its centre. These will often have messages written on the cross. More formal visits will often leave a poppy wreath. Jewish war graves are sometimes marked by a timber Star of David.

=== Candles ===
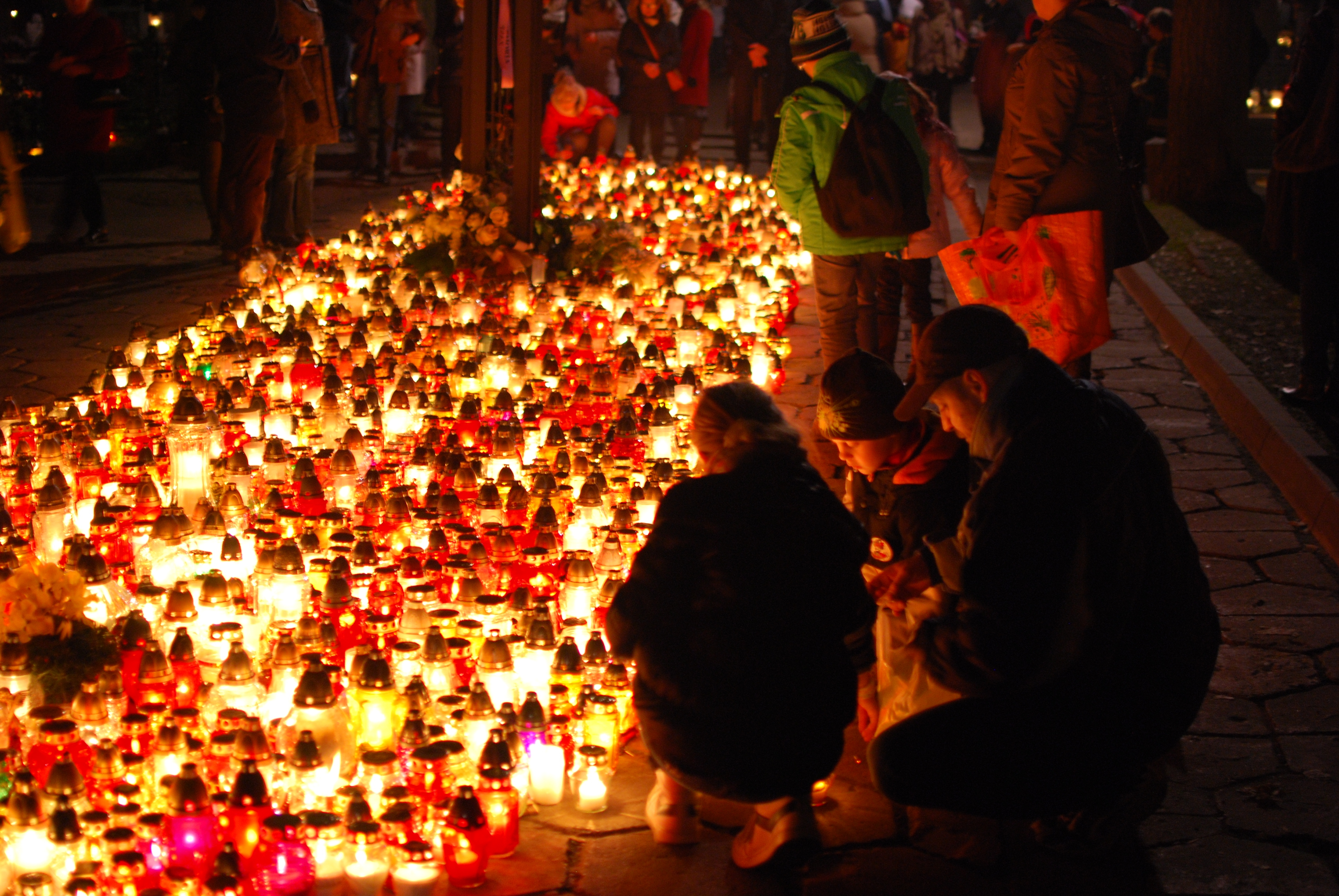
Grave candles in the Old Cemetery in Łódź, Poland

Placing burning grave candles on the cemetery to commemorate the dead is a very common tradition in Catholic nations, for example, Poland. It is mostly practised on All Souls' Day. The traditional grave candles are called znicz in Polish. A similar practice of grave candles is also used in Eastern Orthodox Christian nations, as well as the Lutheran Christian Nordic countries. In Finland, it is popular to take grave candles to relatives' graves at Christmas; as many as three-quarters of Finnish households participate in this tradition.

=== Toys ===
In the American South, graves of children are often decorated with emblems of childhood. These include favorite toys, balloons, seasonal decorations, religious figurines, and more.

== Contemporary management ==
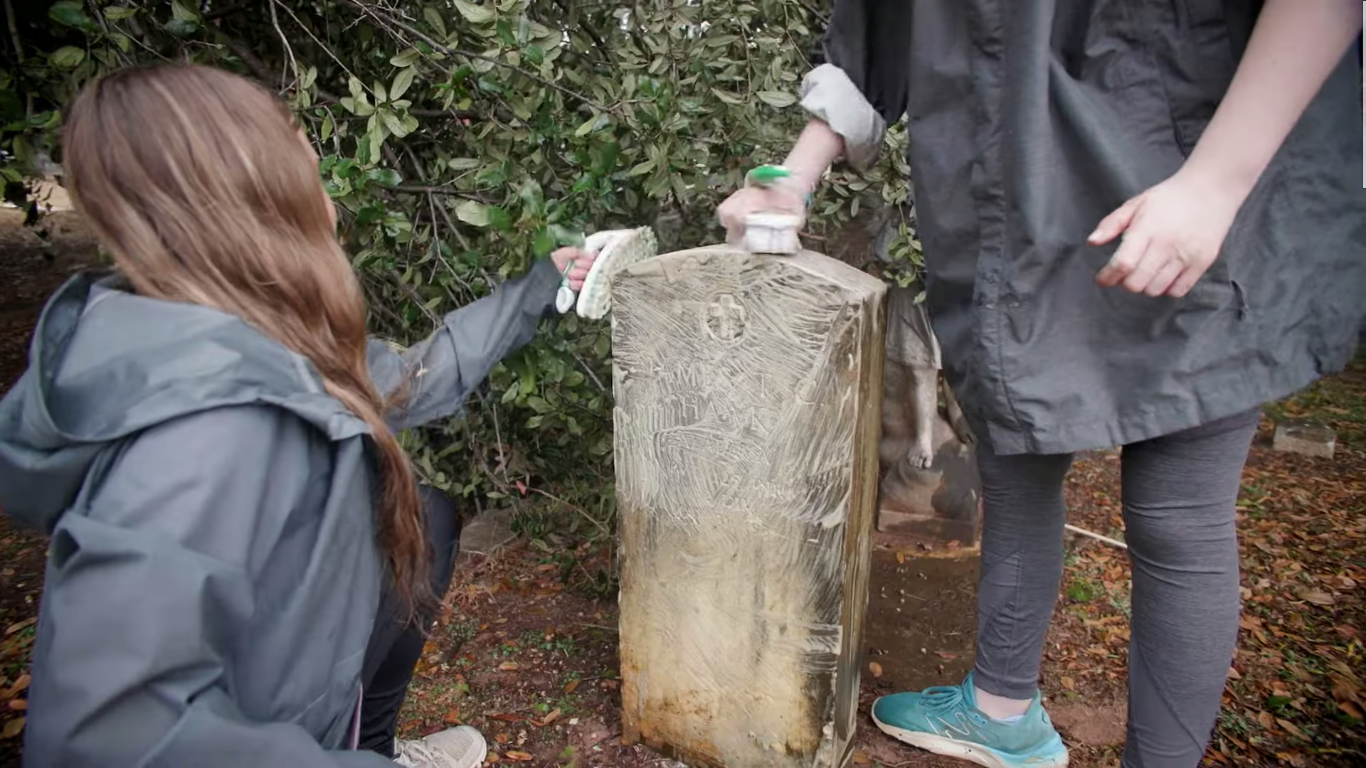
Volunteers cleaning a gravestone in Tuscaloosa, Alabama

Traditionally, cemetery management only involves the allocation of land for burial, the digging and filling of graves, and the maintenance of the grounds and landscaping. The construction and maintenance of headstones and other grave monuments are usually the responsibilities of surviving families and friends. However, increasingly, many people regard the resultant collection of individual headstones, concrete slabs and fences (some of which may be decayed or damaged) to be aesthetically unappealing, leading to new cemetery developments either standardising the shape or design of headstones or plaques, sometimes by providing a standard shaped marker as part of the service provided by the cemetery.

=== Grave digging ===
Cemetery authorities normally employ a full-time staff of caretakers to dig graves. The term gravedigger is still used in casual speech, though many cemeteries have adopted the term caretaker, since their duties often involve maintenance of the cemetery grounds and facilities. The employment of skilled personnel for the preparation of graves is done not only to ensure the grave is dug in the correct location and at the correct depth, but also to relieve families from having to dig the grave for a recently dead relative, and as a matter of public safety, in order to prevent inexperienced visitors from injuring themselves, to ensure unused graves are properly covered, and to avoid legal liability that would result from an injury related to an improperly dug or uncovered grave.

Preparation of the grave usually begins before mourners arrive for the burial. The cemetery caretakers fill the grave after the burial, generally after the mourners have departed. Mechanical equipment, such as backhoes, are used to reduce labour cost of digging and filling, but some hand shovelling may still be required.

In the United Kingdom the minimum depth from the surface to the highest lid is 36 inches (91 cm). There must be 6 inches (15 cm) between each coffin, which on average is 15 inches (38 cm) high. If the soil is free-draining and porous, only 24 inches (61 cm) of soil on top is required. Coffins may be interred at lesser depths or even above ground as long as they are encased in a concrete chamber. Before 1977, double graves were dug to 8 feet (240 cm) and singles to 6 feet (180 cm). As a single grave is now dug to 54 inches (140 cm), old cemeteries contain many areas where new single graves can be dug on "old ground". This is considered a valid method of resource management and provides income to keep older cemeteries viable, thus forestalling the need for permanent closure, which would result in a reduction of their work force.

=== Cemetery key ===
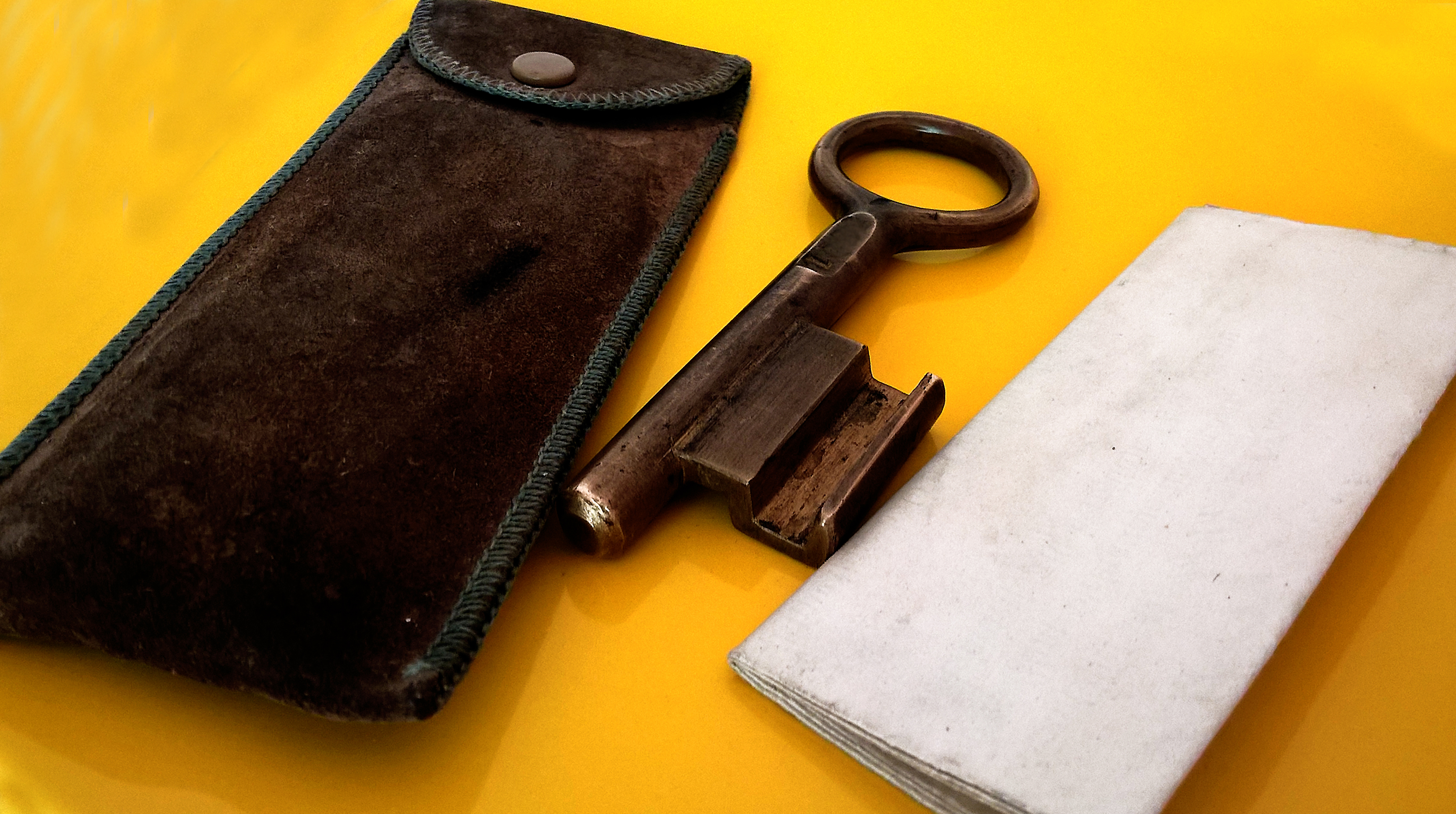
Brass cemetery key of a pastor, with handover document and sheath — around 1935

The key is a central element of Christianity. Keys of death and hell as a metaphor and synonym for these often stands the cemetery key. Today it is also integrated in many games as the "graveyard key holder".

=== Burial registers ===
Usually there is a legal requirement to maintain records regarding the burials (or interment of ashes) within a cemetery. These burial registers usually contain (at a minimum) the name of the person buried, the date of burial and the location of the burial plots within the cemetery, although some contain far more detail. The Arlington National Cemetery, one of the United States' largest military cemeteries, has a registry, The ANC Explorer, which contains details such as photographs of the front and back of the tombstones. Burial registers are an important resource for genealogy.

=== Land use ===
In order to physically manage the space within the cemetery (to avoid burials in existing graves) and to record locations in the burial register, most cemeteries have some systematic layout of graves in rows, generally grouped into larger sections as required. Often the cemetery displays this information in the form of a map, which is used both by the cemetery administration in managing their land use and by friends and family members seeking to locate a particular grave within the cemetery.

=== Pressures ===
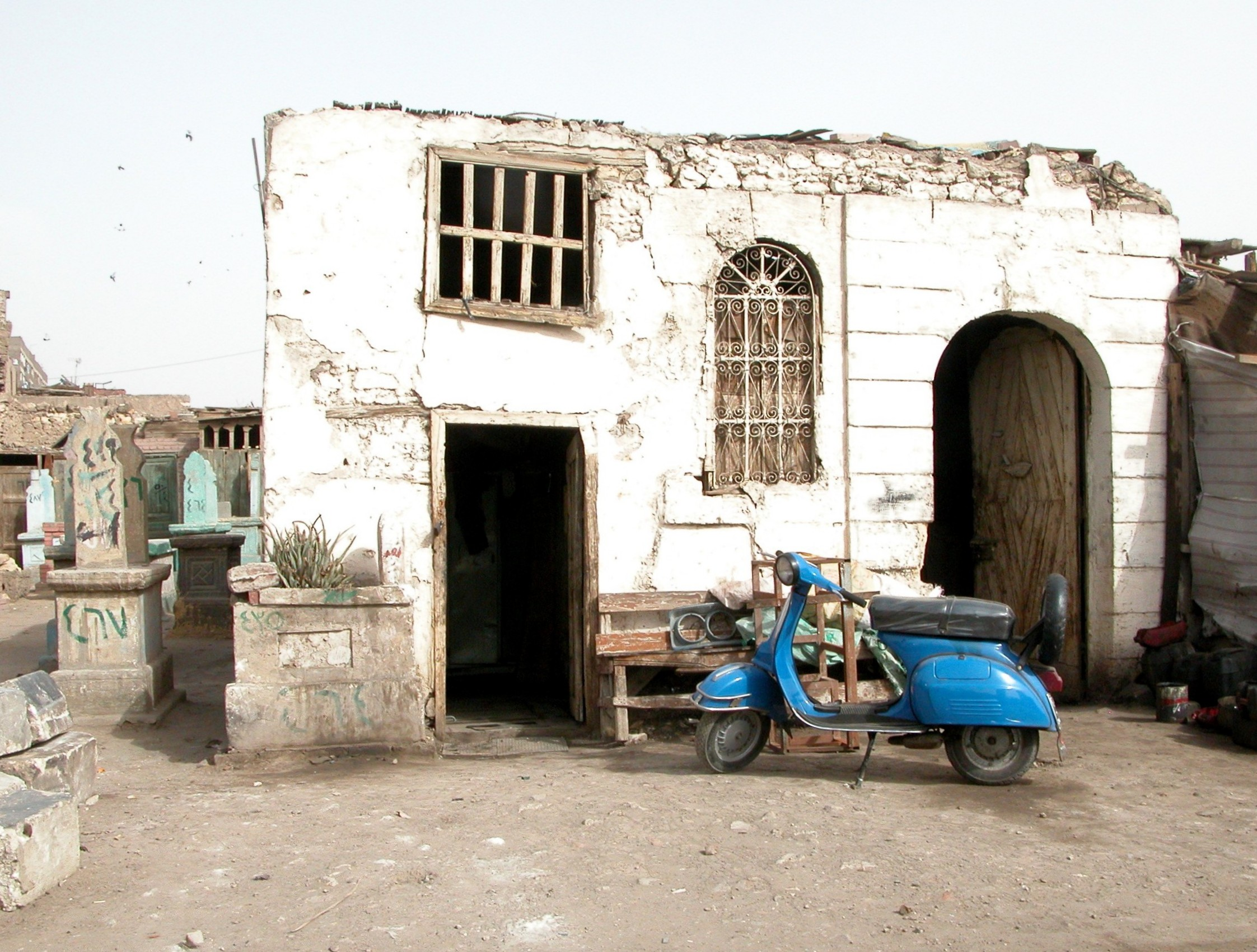
A tomb retrofitted as a residence in the City of the Dead. Cairo's City of the Dead is a centuries-old cemetery that has become home to as many as 1 million Egyptians during the last decades.

Cemetery authorities face a number of tensions in regard to the management of cemeteries.

One issue relates to cost. Traditionally, a single payment is made at the time of burial, but the cemetery authority incurs expenses in cemetery maintenance over many decades. Many cemetery authorities find that their accumulated funds are not sufficient for the costs of long-term maintenance. This shortfall in funds for maintenance results in three main options: charge much higher prices for new burials, obtain some other kind of public subsidy, or neglect maintenance. For cemeteries without space for new burials, the options are even more limited. Public attitudes towards subsidies are highly variable. People with family buried in local cemeteries are usually quite concerned about neglect of cemetery maintenance and will usually argue in favour of public subsidy of local cemetery maintenance, whereas other people without personal connection to the cemetery often argue that public subsidies of private cemeteries is an inappropriate use of their taxes. Some jurisdictions require a certain amount of money be set aside in perpetuity and invested so that the interest earned can be used for maintenance.

Another issue relates to limited amount of land. In many larger towns and cities, the older cemeteries which were initially considered to be large often run out of space for new burials and there is no vacant adjacent land available to extend the cemetery or even land in the same general area to create new cemeteries. New cemeteries are generally established on the periphery of towns and cities, where large tracts of land are still available. However, people often wish to be buried in the same cemetery as other relatives, and are not interested in being buried in new cemeteries with which there is no sense of connection to their family, creating pressure to find more space in existing cemeteries.

A third issue is the maintenance of monuments and headstones, which are generally the responsibility of families, but often become neglected over time. Decay and damage through vandalism or cemetery maintenance practices can render monuments and headstones either unsafe or at least unsightly. On the other hand, some families do not forget the grave but constantly visit, leaving behind flowers, plants, and other decorative items that create their own maintenance problem.

=== Reuse of graves ===
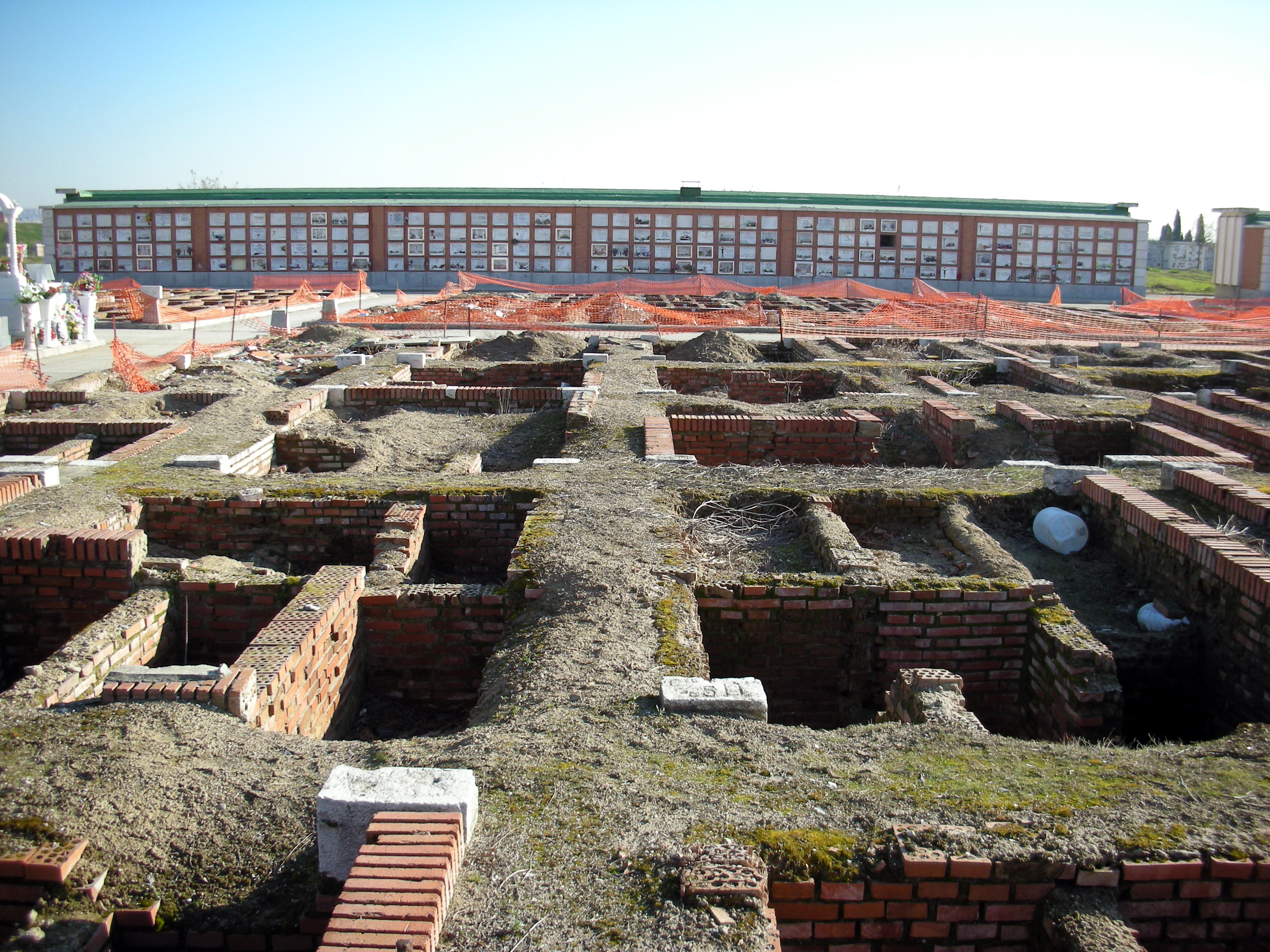
Cemetery excavations, like this one in Madrid, can alleviate overcrowding.

All of these issues tend to put pressure on the reuse of grave sites within cemeteries. The reuse of graves already used for burial can cause considerable upset to family members. Although the authorities might declare that the grave is sufficiently old that there will be no human remains still present, nonetheless many people regard the reuse of graves (particularly their family's graves) as a desecration. Also reuse of a used grave involves the removal of any monuments and headstones, which may cause further distress to families (although families will typically be allowed to take away the monuments and headstones if they wish).

On the other hand, cemetery authorities are well aware that many old graves are forgotten and not visited and that their reuse will not cause distress to anyone. However, there may be some older graves in a cemetery for whom there are local and vocal descendants who will mount a public campaign against reuse. One pragmatic strategy is to publicly announce plans to reuse older graves and invite families to respond if they are willing or not. Reuse then only occurs where there are no objections allowing the "forgotten" graves to be reused. Sometimes the cemetery authorities request a further payment to avoid reuse of a grave, but often this backfires politically.

A practical problem with regard to contacting families is that the person who initially purchased the burial plot(s) may have subsequently died and locating living family members, if any, many decades later is virtually impossible (or at least prohibitively expensive). Public notice about the proposed reuse of graves may or may not reach family members living further afield who may object to such practices. Therefore, it is possible that reuse could occur without family awareness.

Some cemeteries did foresee the need for reuse and included in their original terms and conditions a limited tenure on a grave site and most new cemeteries follow this practice, having seen the problems faced by older cemeteries. Common practice in Europe is to place bones in an ossuary after the proscribed burial period is over.

However, even when the cemetery has the legal right to reuse a grave, strong public opinion often forces the authorities to back down on that reuse. Also, even when cemeteries have a limited tenure provision in place, funding shortages can force them to contemplate reuse earlier than the original arrangements provided for.

Another type of grave site considered for reuse are empty plots purchased years ago but never used. In principle it would seem easier to "reuse" such grave sites as there can be no claims of desecration, but often this is made complicated by the legal rights to be buried obtained by the pre-purchase, as any limited tenure clause only takes effect after there has been a burial. Again, cemetery authorities suspect that in many cases the holders of these burial rights are probably dead and that nobody will exercise that burial right, but again some families are aware of the burial rights they possess and do intend to exercise them as and when family members die. Again the difficulty of being unable to locate the holders of these burial rights complicates the reuse of those graves.

As historic cemeteries begin to reach their capacity for full burials, alternative memorialization, such as collective memorials for cremated individuals, is becoming more common. Different cultures have different attitudes to destruction of cemeteries and use of the land for construction. In some countries it is considered normal to destroy the graves, while in others the graves are traditionally respected for a century or more. In many cases, after a suitable period of time has elapsed, the headstones are removed and the now former cemetery is converted to a recreational park or construction site. A more recent trend, particularly in South American cities, involves constructing high-rise buildings to house graves.

Cemeteries in the US may be relocated if the land is required for other reasons. For instance, many cemeteries in the southeastern United States were relocated by the Tennessee Valley Authority from areas about to be flooded by dam construction. Cemeteries may also be moved so that the land can be reused for transportation structures, public buildings, or even private development. Cemetery relocation is not necessarily possible in other parts of the world; in Alberta, Canada, for instance, the Cemetery Act expressly forbids the relocation of cemeteries or the mass exhumation of marked graves for any reason whatsoever. This has caused significant problems in the provision of transportation services to the southern half of Calgary, as the main southbound road connecting the south end of the city with downtown threads through a series of cemeteries founded in the 1930s. The light rail transit line running to the south end eventually had to be built directly under the road.

In Singapore, burials are limited to 15 years before graves are exhumed. This has led to a preference of cremation over burial among Singaporeans.

=== Abandonment ===
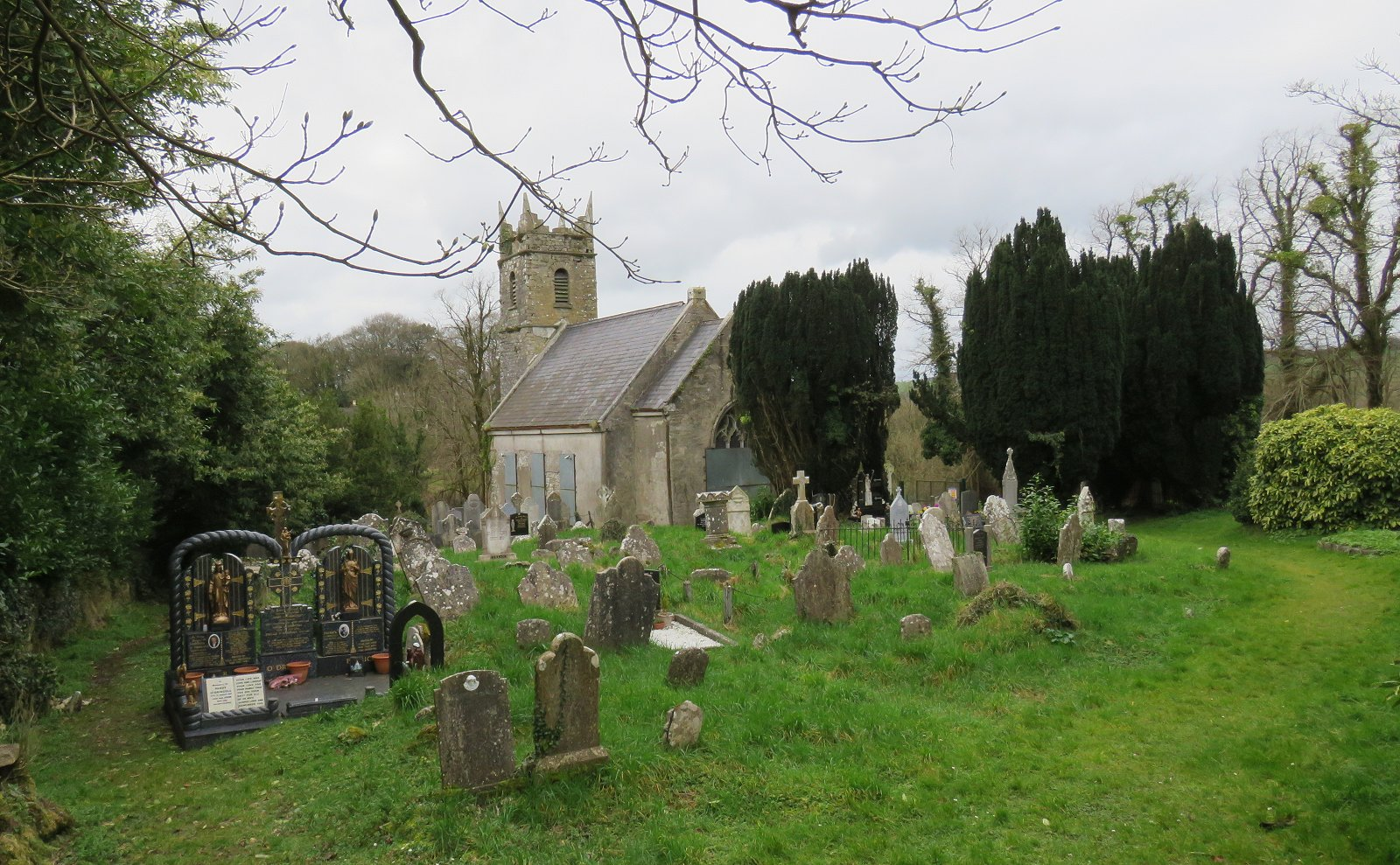
An abandoned church and cemetery

An abandoned graveyard or cemetery is no longer being used or maintained, and has fallen into a state of disrepair. Graveyards may be abandoned for various reasons, such as financial difficulty, natural disaster, unpleasant reputation and/or accessibility. Sometimes graveyard management needs to be transferred from a local church to another body, for example if a church is closed.

Abandoned cemeteries ordinarily fade away in a gradual manner. Abandoned cemeteries are of particular interest to urban explorers. There are thousands of abandoned graveyards in the United States.

Unmaintained tombstones at New Utrecht Cemetery in Brooklyn, New York

Locating and identifying individual graves in an abandoned cemetery may be hard due to lithophytes or lichens overgrowing on the tombstone markings. In some cases, it may be difficult because the tombstones have been vandalized.

== Superstitions ==
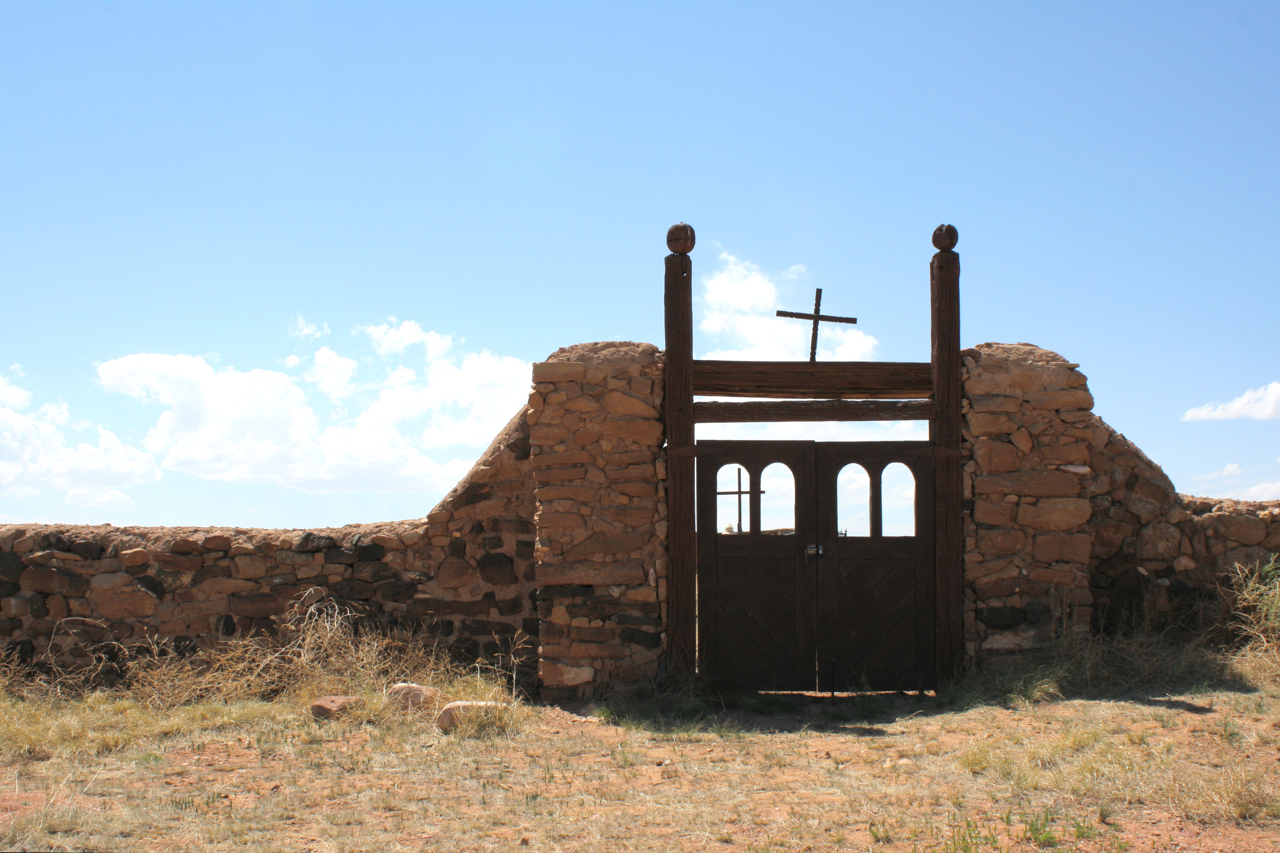
Cemetery gate, Galisteo, New Mexico

In many countries, cemeteries are places believed to hold both superstition and legend characteristics, being used, usually at night times, as an altar in supposed black magic ceremonies or similarly clandestine happenings, such as devil worshipping, grave-robbing (gold teeth and jewelry are preferred), thrilling sex encounters, or drug and alcohol abuse not related to the cemetery aura.

The legend of zombies, as romanticized by Wade Davis in The Serpent and the Rainbow, is not exceptional among cemetery myths, as cemeteries are believed to be places where witches and sorcerers get skulls and bones needed for their sinister rituals.

In the Afro-Brazilian urban mythos (such as Umbanda), there is a character loosely related to cemeteries and its aura: the Zé Pilintra (in fact, Zé Pilintra is more related to bohemianism and night life than with cemeteries, where the reigning entity is Exu Caveira or Exu Cemitério, similar to Voodoo Baron Samedi).

== Gallery ==
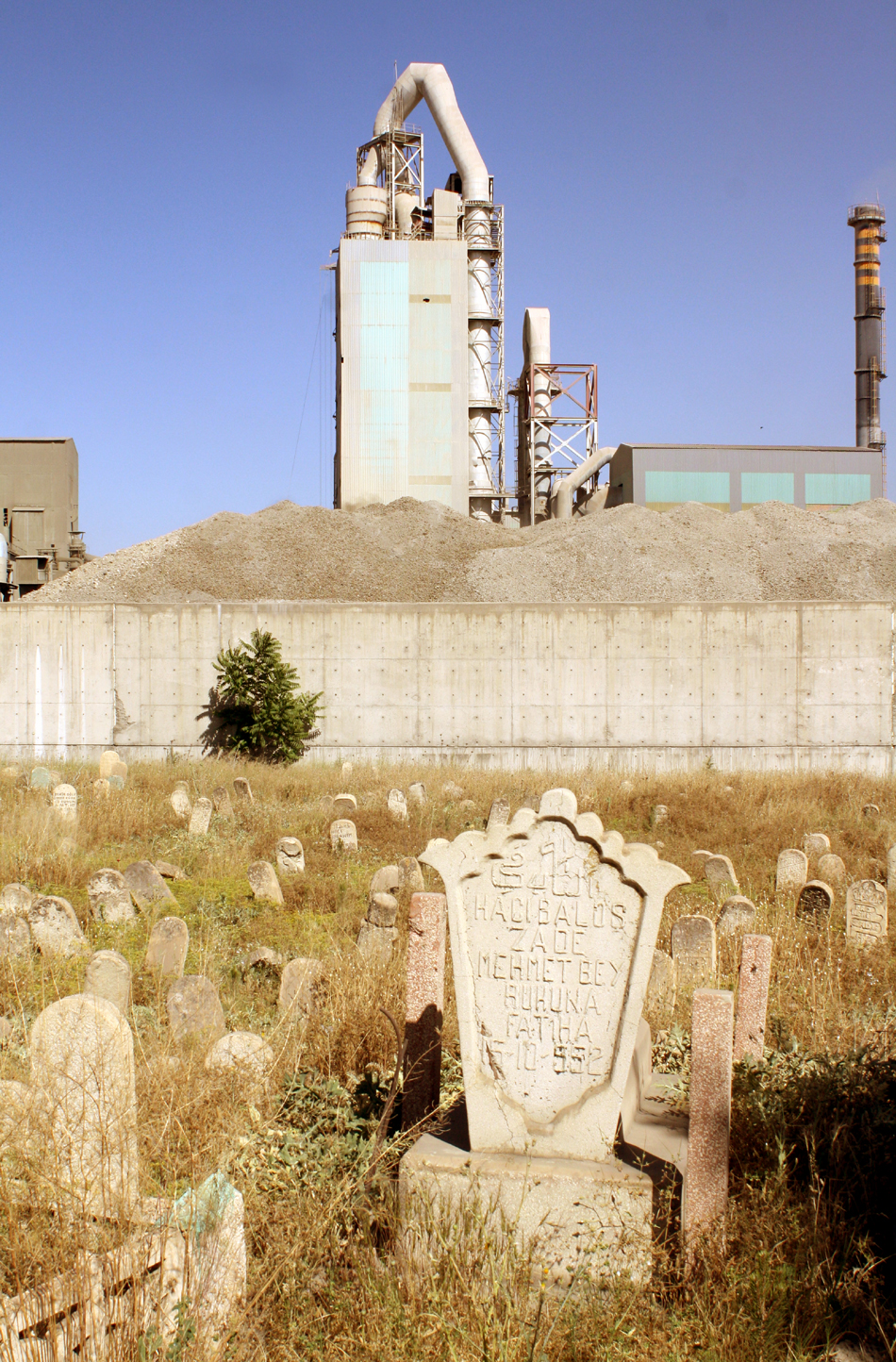
Old graveyard in Elazığ, Turkey.

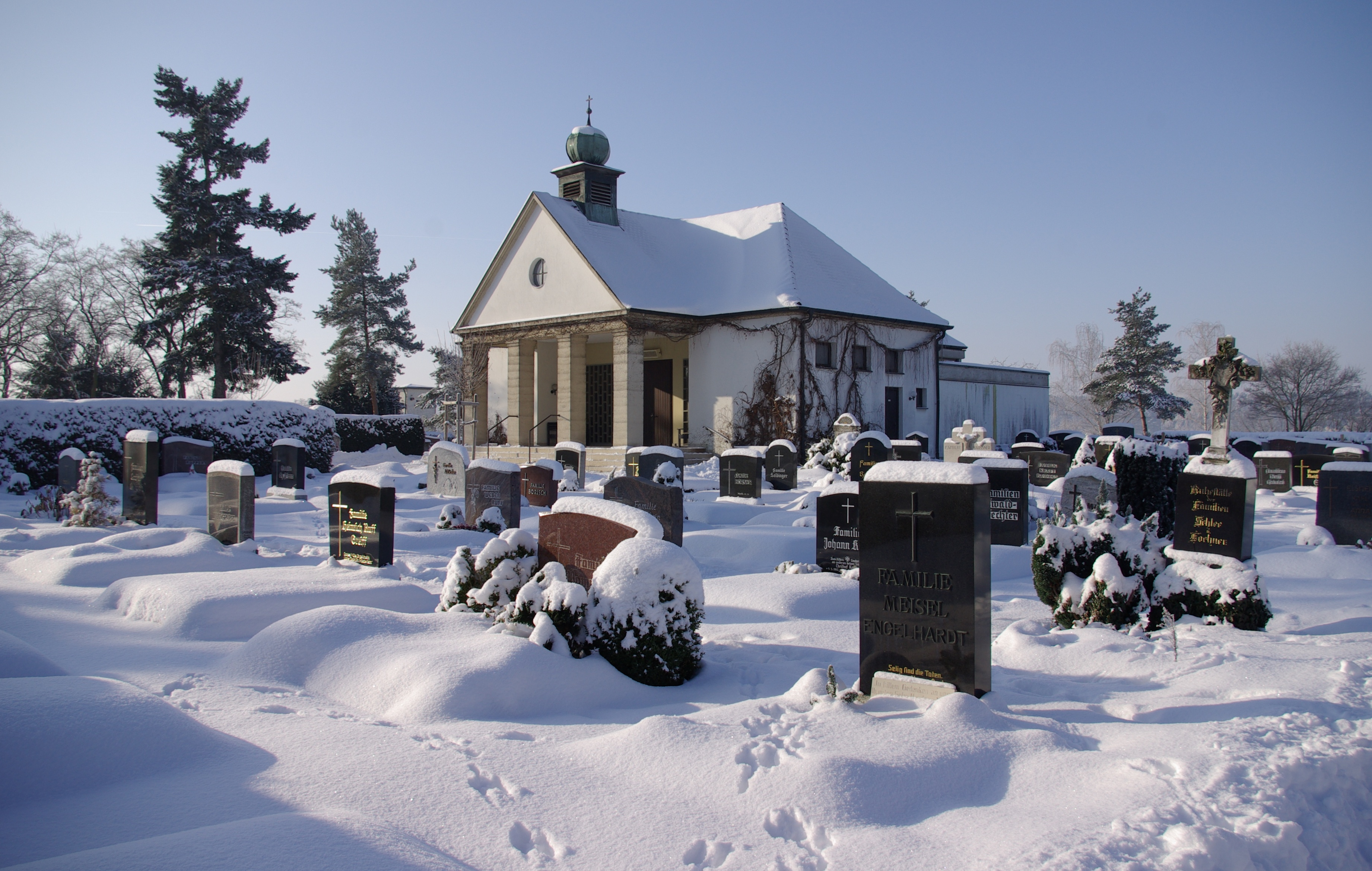
Cemetery in Franconia, Germany.

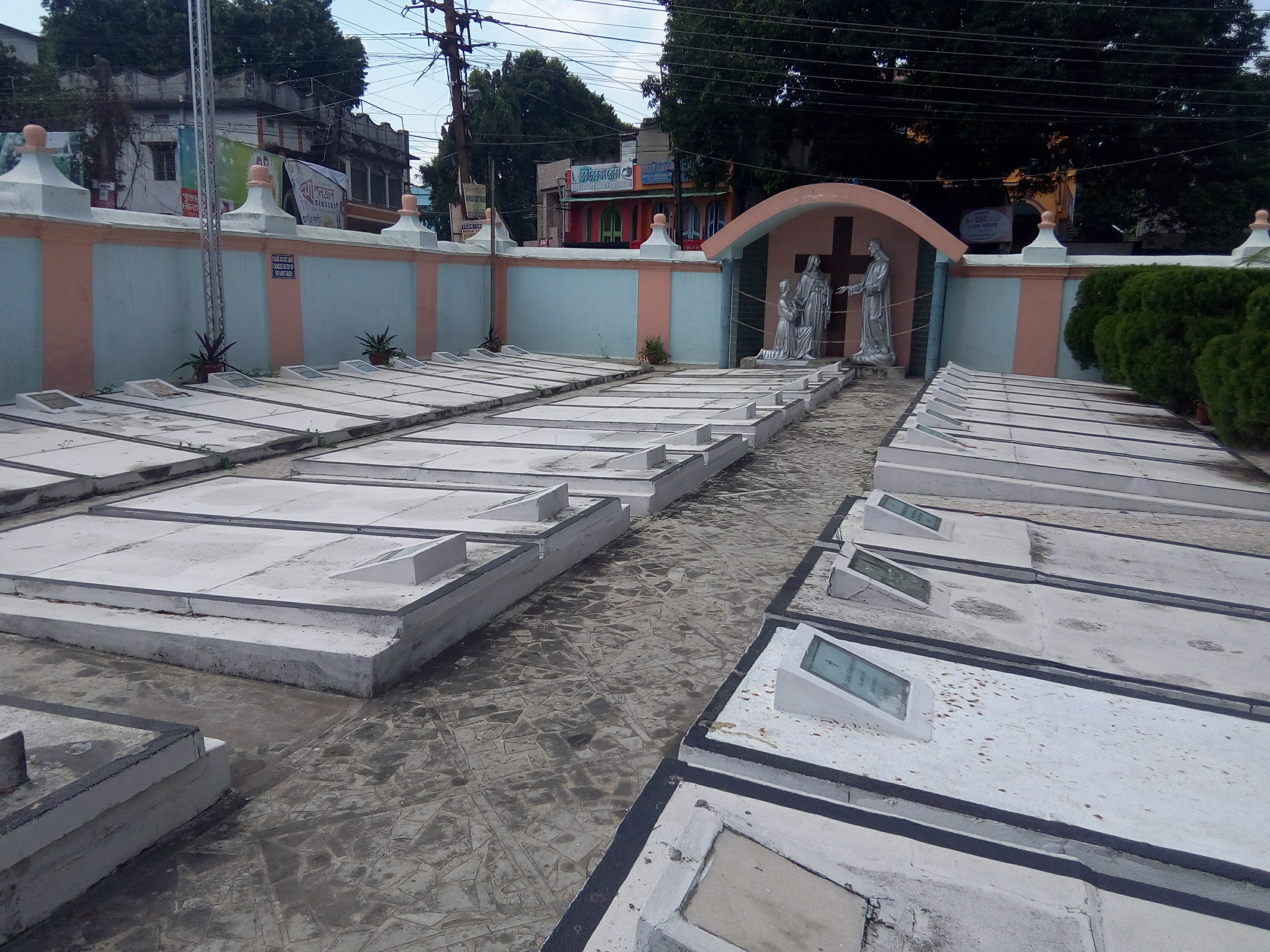
Graveyard at the Basilica of the Holy Rosary in Bandel, West Bengal.

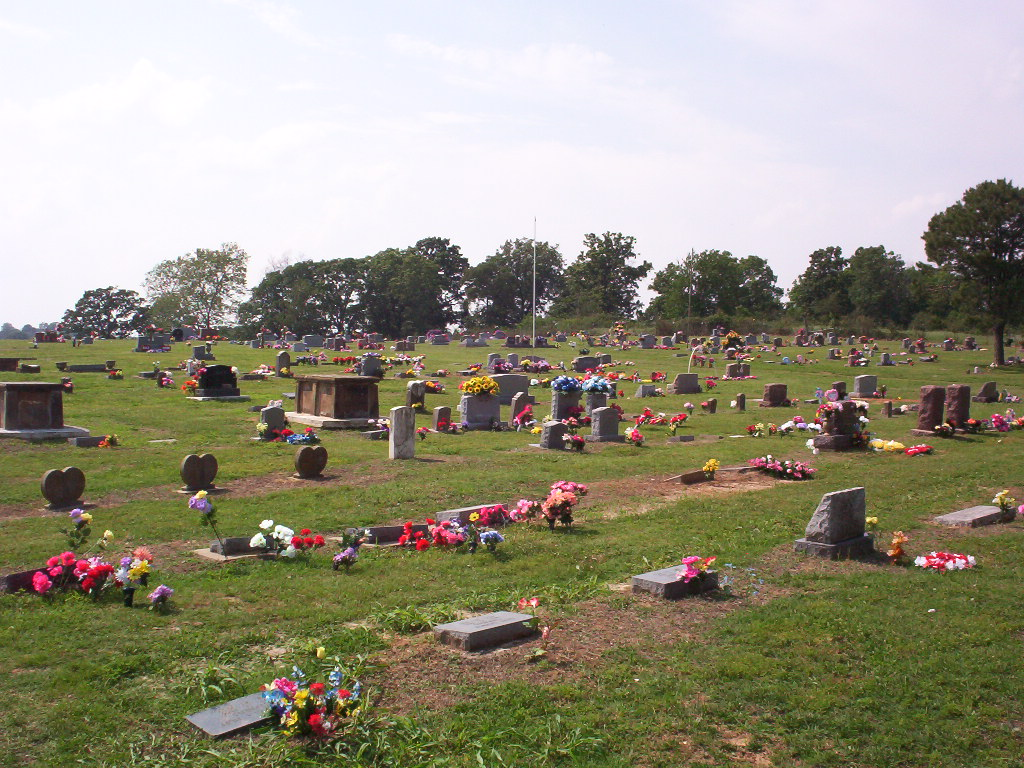
Holland Cemetery, a rural cemetery in northeast Oklahoma.

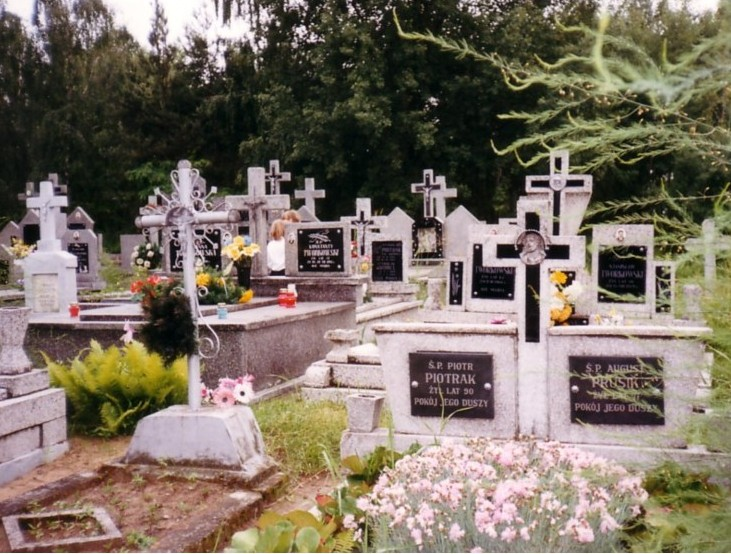
A village cemetery in Jednorożec, Poland.

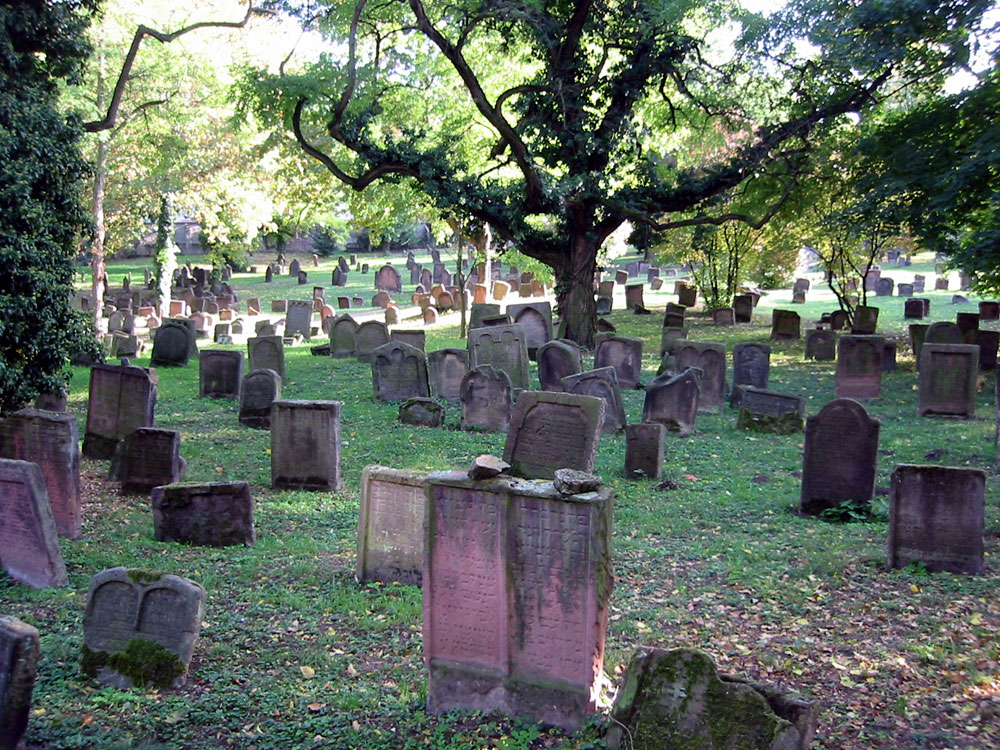
Jewish cemetery "Heiliger Sand" in Worms, Germany.

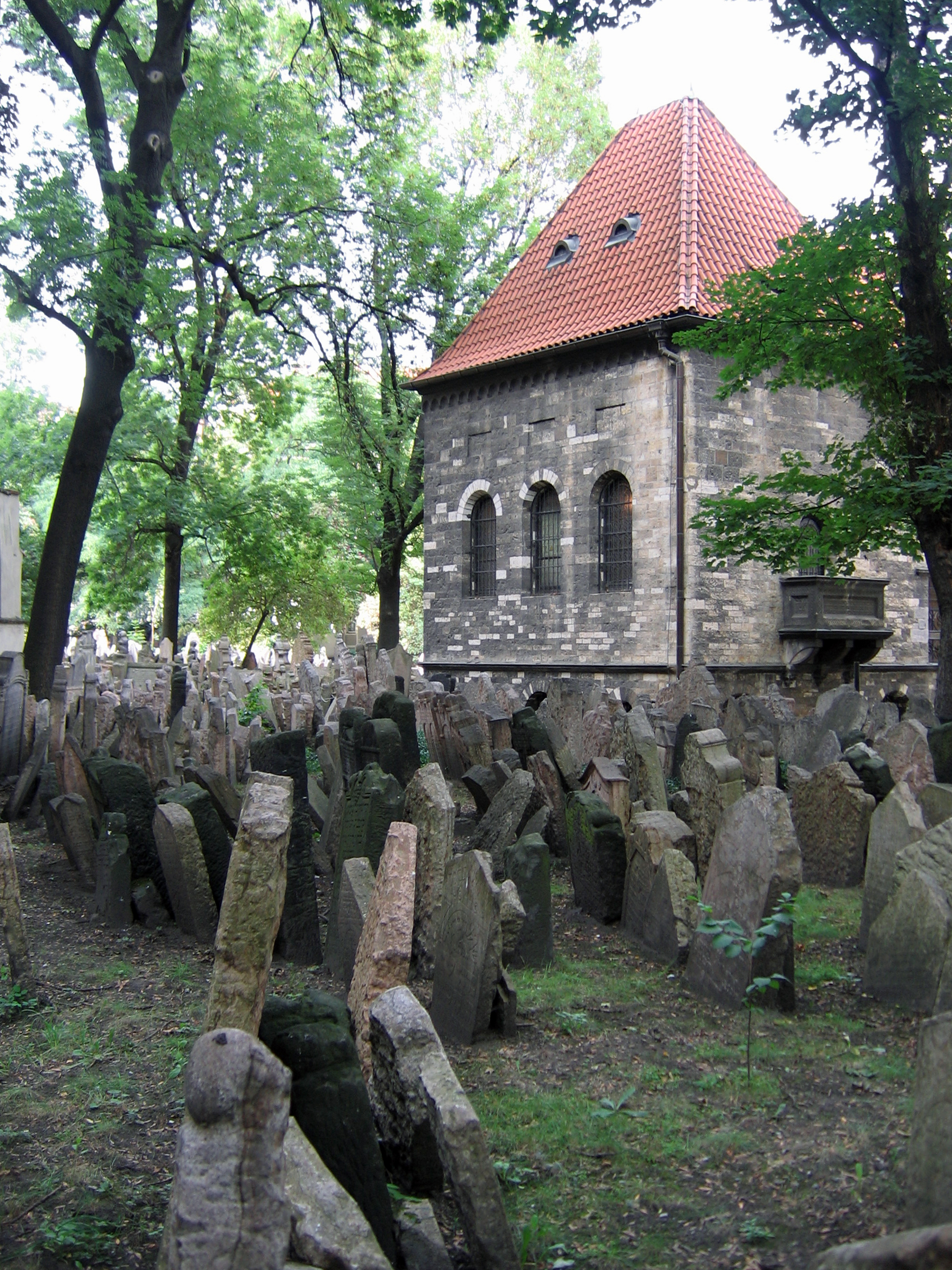
Prague's Old Jewish Cemetery is the last resting place for more than 100,000 people who had been buried here since the 15th century.

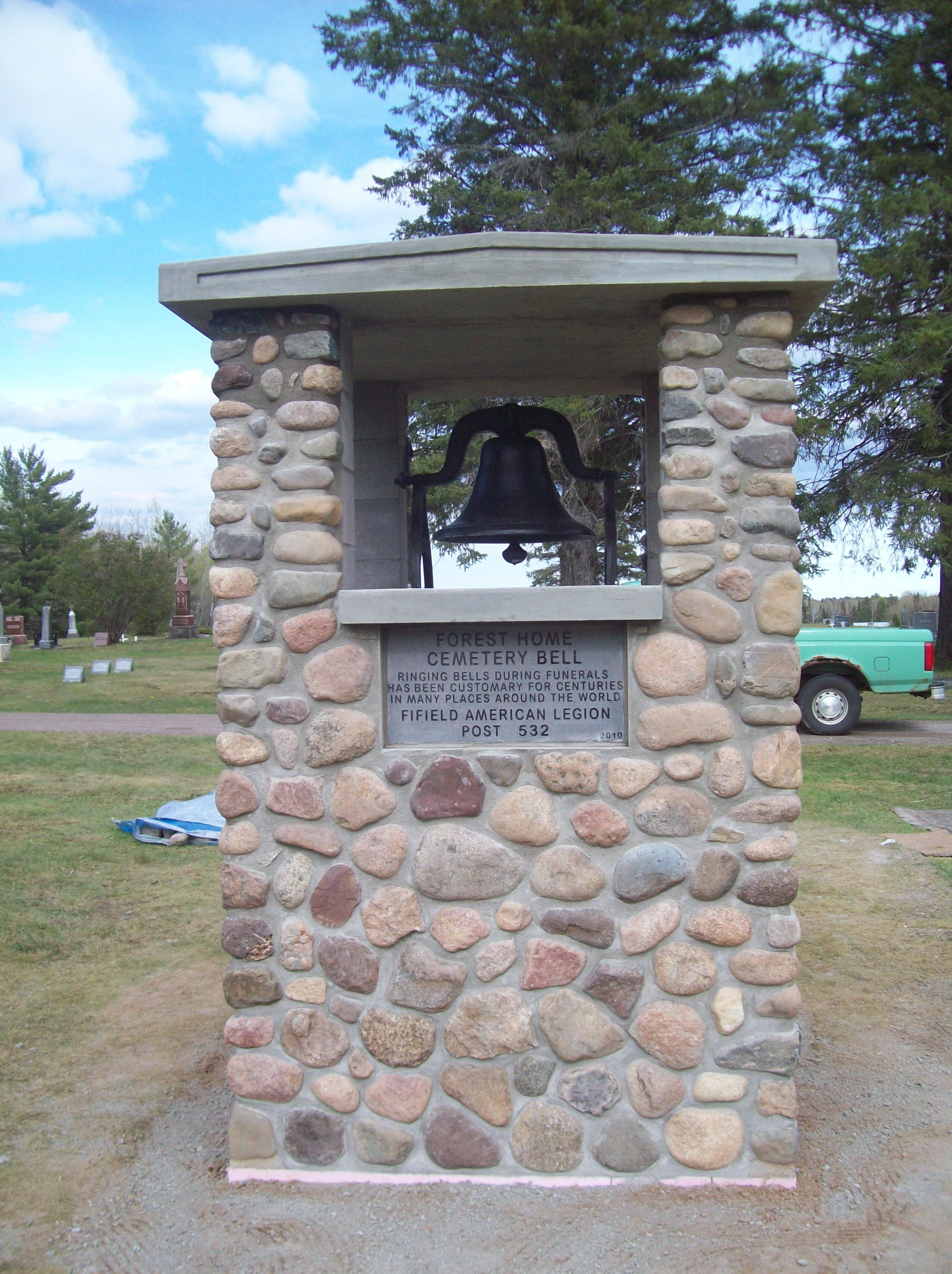
A belltower at Forest Home Cemetery, in Fifield, Wisconsin. Tolling bells during funerals has been customary in some places around the world.

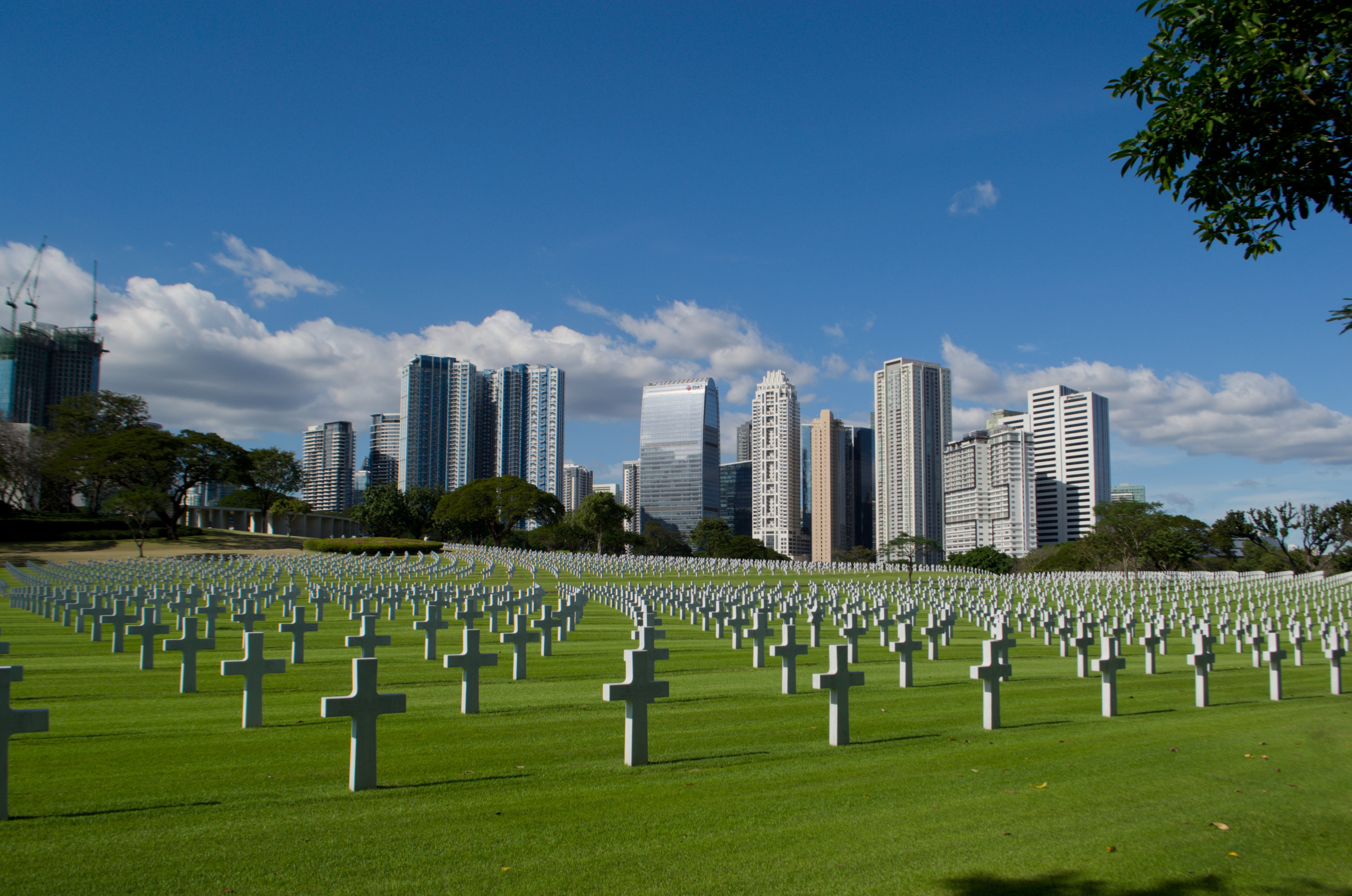
Manila American Cemetery and Memorial, the largest American military cemetery outside of the United States.

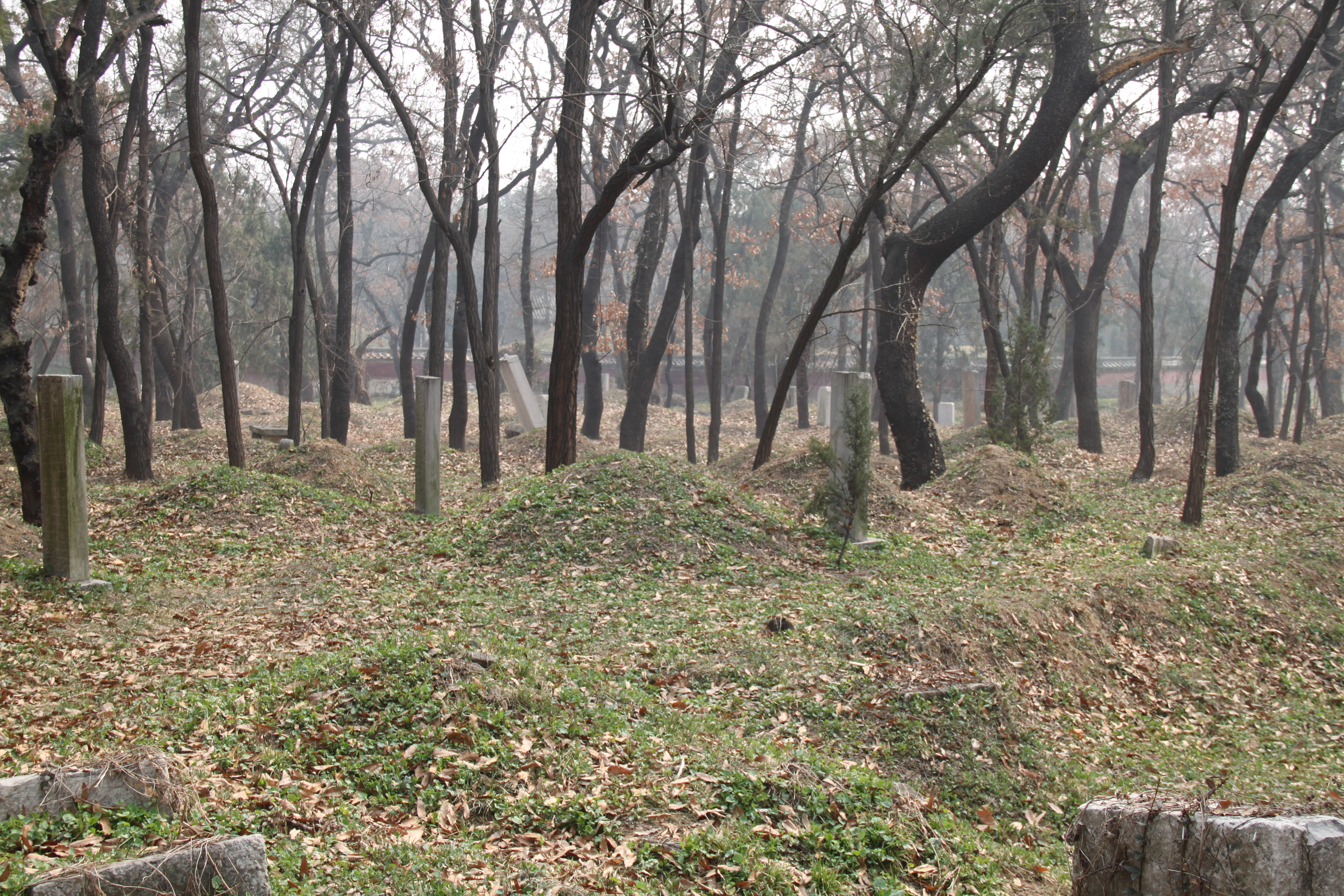
Cemetery of Confucius, Qufu, China, part of the UNESCO World Heritage Site "Temple and Cemetery of Confucius and the Kong Family Mansion in Qufu".

== See also ==
- Corpse road
- Pet cemetery
- Prison cemetery
- Lists of cemeteries by country
- Catacomb
- Churchyard
- Coemeterium
- Columbarium
- Crypt
- Grave field
- Mass grave
- Necropolis
- Ossuary
- Tomb
- Tumulus
- Unmarked grave
- War grave

== Bibliography ==
- Cantor, Norman L. (2010). After We Die: The Life and Times of the Human Cadaver. Washington, D.C.: Georgetown University Press. ISBN 978-1-58901-713-9.
- Carmack, Sharon DeBartolo (2002). Your Guide to Cemetery Research. Betterway Books. ISBN 978-1-55870-589-0.
- Carroll, Andrew (2013). Here Is Where: Discovering America's Great Forgotten History. New York: Crown Archetype. ISBN 978-0-307-46399-9.
- Colvin, Howard (1991). Architecture and the After-Life. New Haven: Yale University Press.
- Curl, James Stevens (2002). Death and Architecture. Gloucestershire: Sutton.
- Eggener, Keith (2010). Cemeteries. New York: W.W. Norton & Co. ISBN 978-0-393-73169-9.
- Etlin, Richard A. (1984). The Architecture of Death: the transformation of the cemetery in eighteenth-century Paris. Cambridge, MA: MIT Press.
- Flanders, Judith (2014). The Victorian City: Everyday Life in Dickens' London. New York: Thomas Dunne Books. ISBN 978-1-250-04021-3.
- Forman, Richard T.T. (2014). Urban Ecology: Science of Cities. Cambridge, U.K.: Cambridge University Press. ISBN 978-1-107-00700-0.
- Grossman, Janet Burnett (2001). Greek Funerary Sculpture. Catalogue of the Collection at the Getty Villa. Los Angeles: J. Paul Getty Museum.
- Harney, Marion (2014). Gardens and Landscapes in Historic Building Conservation. Chichester, West Sussex, U.K.: John Wiley & Sons. ISBN 978-1-118-50812-1.
- Hodgson, Larry (2001). The Garden Lover's Guide to Canada. New York: Princeton Architectural Press. ISBN 978-1-56898-279-3.
- Keels, Thomas H. (2003). Philadelphia Graveyards and Cemeteries. Charleston, S.C.: Arcadia. ISBN 978-0-7385-1229-7.
- LeeDecker, Charles H. (2009). "Preparing for an Afterlife of Earth: The Transformation of Mortuary Behavior in Nineteenth-Century North America". In Majewski, Teresita; Gaimster, David R. M. (eds.). International Handbook of Historical Archaeology. New York: Springer. ISBN 978-0-387-72068-5.
- Meuser, Helmut (2010). Contaminated Urban Soils. Dordrecht, Netherlands: Springer. ISBN 978-90-481-9327-1.
- Mickey, Thomas J. (2013). America's Romance With the English Garden. Athens, Ohio: Ohio University Press. ISBN 978-0-8214-2035-5.
- Mytum, Harold (2004). Mortuary Monuments and Burial Grounds of the Historic Period. New York: Kluwer Academic Publishing. ISBN 978-0-306-48075-1.
- Nonini, Donald Macon (2014). A Companion to Urban Anthropology. Malden, Mass.: Wiley-Blackwell. ISBN 978-1-118-37864-9.
- Salisbury, Mike. "From My Death May Life Come Forth. A Feasibility Study of the Woodland Cemetery in Canada". Earthartist.com.
- Taylor, Richard; Allen, Alistair (2006). "Waste Disposal and Landfill: Potential Hazards and Information Needs". In Schmoll, Oliver; Howard, Guy; Chilton, John; Chorus, Ingrid (eds.). Protecting Groundwater for Health: Managing the Quality of Drinking-Water Sources. Cornwall, U.K.: World Health Organisation. ISBN 978-1-84339-079-4.
- Thomas, Jeannie B. (2003). Naked Barbies, Warrior Joes, and Other Forms of Visible Gender. Urbana, Ill.: University of Illinois Press. p. 32. ISBN 978-0-252-02854-0.
- Upton, Dell (1997). "The Urban Cemetery and the Urban Community: The Origin of the New Orleans Cemetery". In adams, Annmarie; McMurry, Sally Ann (eds.). Exploring Everyday Landscapes. Knoxville, Tenn.: University of Tennessee Press. ISBN 978-0-87049-983-8.
- Vercelloni, Matteo; Vercelloni, Virgilio (2010). Inventing the Garden. Los Angeles: J. Paul Getty Museum. ISBN 978-1-60606-047-6.
- Worpole, Ken (2003). Last Landscapes: the architecture of the cemetery in the West. London: Reaktion Books. ISBN 978-1-86189-161-7.
