= Fazendeville, Louisiana =

- Extinct, 1966
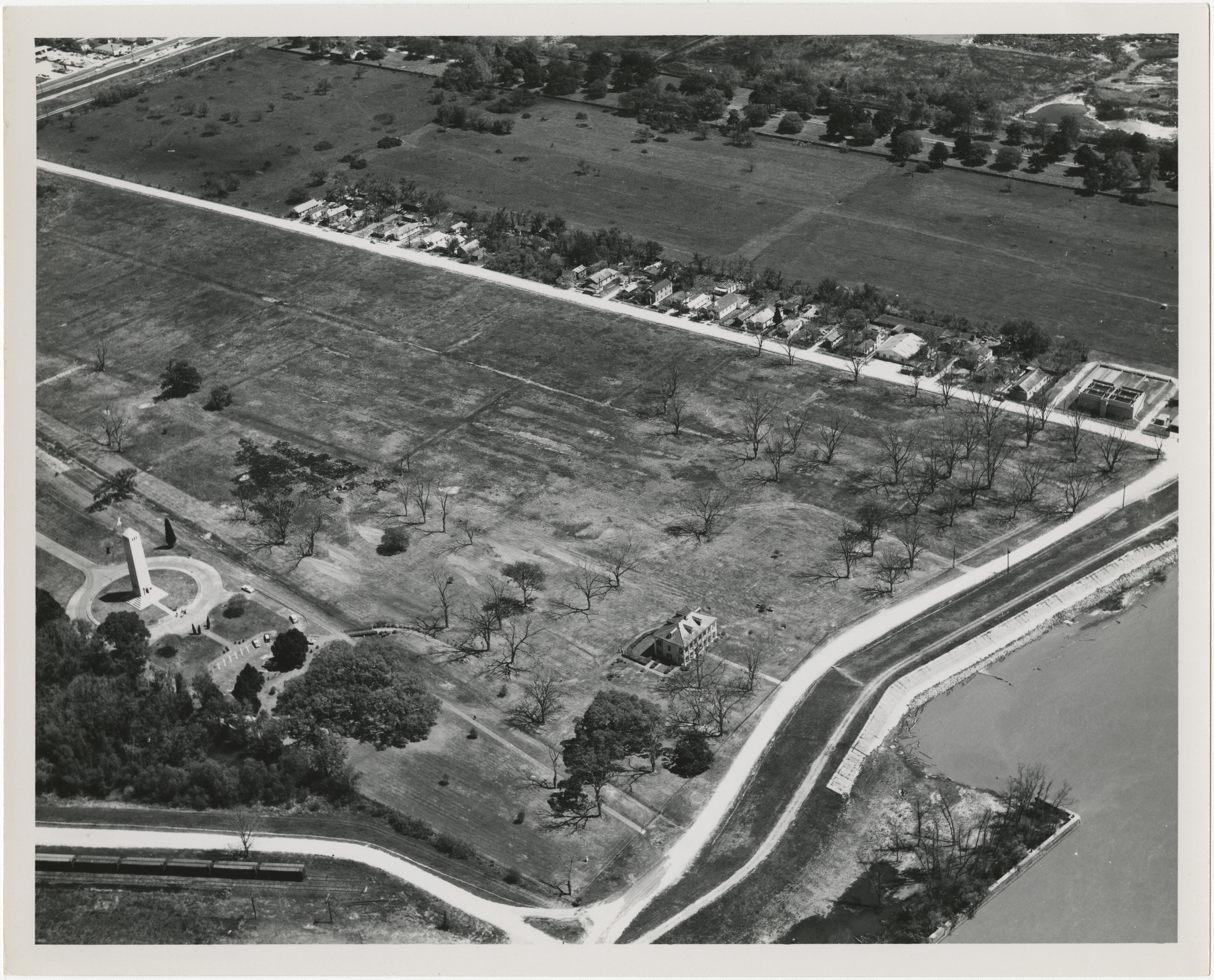
- Fazendeville and the Chalmette National Cemetery and Chalmette monument, aerial view from southwest, 1963
- Nickname: The Village
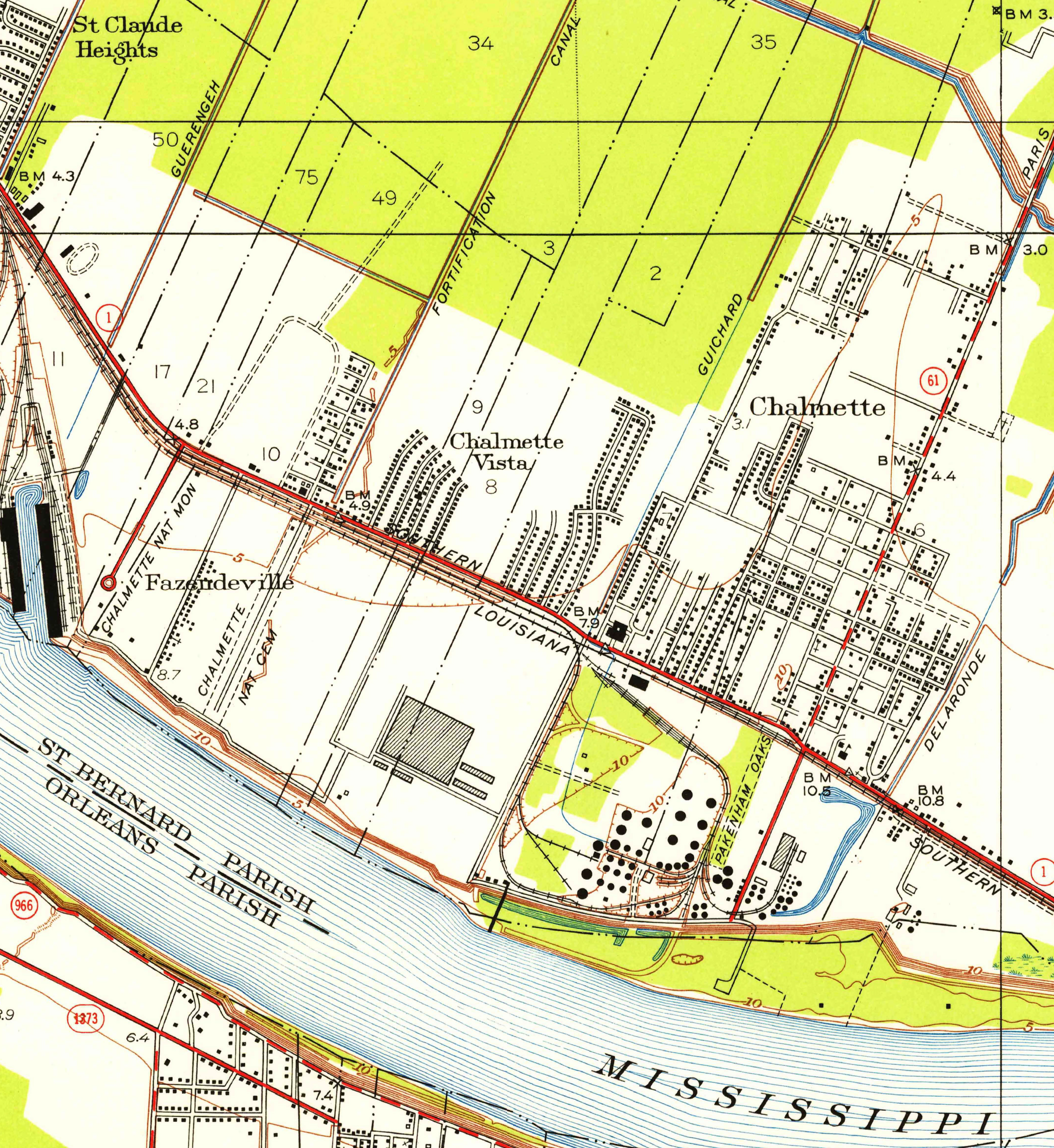
- 1951 United States Geological Survey map showing Fazendeville's geographic relationship to the Chalmette Battleground and town of Chalmette

- Location within Louisiana Location within the United States
- Coordinates: 29°56′29″N 89°59′29″W
- Country: United States
- State: Louisiana
- Parish: St. Bernard
- Time zone: Central (CST)
  - Summer (DST): CDT
- Village demolished between 1964 and 1966 to consolidate property into U.S. federal park land of Chalmette National Battlefield. Residents resettled mostly in 9th Ward of New Orleans.

Fazendeville was a small, historic, African American community in St. Bernard Parish, Louisiana, United States. Located near the Freedmen's Cemetery in the parish, this village was razed during the 1960s as part of an expansion of the Chalmette National Battlefield in the Jean Lafitte National Historic Park and Preserve.

It was known to residents who lived there as "The Village."

A significant percentage of the village's displaced residents resettled in New Orleans' Ninth Ward.

== History ==
As it matured, the self-contained village of Fazendeville grew to have its own general stores, a one-room schoolhouse which taught first through eighth grades, two benevolent societies, and the Battle Ground Baptist Church. The main street was Fazendeville Road, which ran from St. Bernard Highway to the River Road which formerly ran along the base of the Mississippi levee. "The houses were situated on the east side of the road. An open pasture lay behind the houses. It was used for a baseball field," according to Chapman. "A large grove of pecan trees flourished west" of a "millrace (a channel whose current is used to power a mill wheel)."

Multiple structures in the village were built using a narrow, rectangular architectural style popularized after the Civil War, which was known as the shotgun house. Individual rooms were placed behind each other, one after another, between a front and rear door, giving rise to the description that a bullet fired from a gun at a home's front door would be able to travel straight through to the back door without hitting anything in between.

=== Mid-Late 1800s ===
In 1854, the land on which the village would be built was listed as part of the succession of Jean Pierre Fazende, a "free man of color", and was inherited by his son of the same name. At the end of the American Civil War, the younger Fazende divided what had been agricultural land into lots and sold them to recently freed slaves, which led to the start of the Black community by 1867. The Battle Ground Baptist Church was subsequently established on April 16, 1868. "A one-street community of 33 lots evolved over the years," according to historian Ron Chapman, who notes that the 1888 state census documented a total of seventeen families who were residents of the community that year.

Social structures within the village also began to emerge during this time. In 1881, residents of Fazendeville formed the Progressive Mutual Aid and Benevolent Association "to provide medical treatment and other kinds of relief for its members, including the cost of burial," according to The St. Bernard Voice, which reported on the sixty-first anniversary of the organization's establishment in its September 26, 1942, edition. "The organization was patterned after the St. Maurice Society, and among those who first guided its destinies were Homer Charles, Carl Cook, Chas. C. Cager, Sebastien Smith and Sol Calvin, who were among the original settlers of the village."

On New Year's Day in 1890, Fazendeville residents commemorated President Abraham Lincoln's issuance of the Emancipation Proclamation with a special program involving an oration by Warren W. Beals of Michigan, speeches by the Rev. E. Nicholas, C.C. Cager, Carl Cook, and Leopold Charles, and a concert presentation by the Chalmette Brass Band. According to music historian, Fazendeville had a very active concert band presence during the early 1890s with performances in the village by the Chalmette Brass Band and other ensembles covered frequently by area newspapers. Nearly eight years later, on Christmas Eve in 1898, The St. Bernard Voice reported that Fazendeville civic leaders planned to hold a special entertainment event to raise public improvement funds to provide for the installation of sidewalks in the village. In 1899, The Times-Picayune of New Orleans reported that Fazendeville residents were planning another special event to raise additional public improvement funding.

=== Early 1900s ===
In April 1902, residents of Fazendeville approved a plan to create a new school for local children that would be operated from the basement of the village's Progressive Hall. On October 12 of that same year, civic leaders hosted a festival to raise funds in support of the First Ward Colored School. According to The St. Bernard Voice, "The idea of giving a festival for the improvement of their school building originated with a number of the progressive citizens of Fazendeville, who aroused the interest and enthusiasm of their neighbors and labored earnestly to raise the necessary funds." Special events included "base ball games, greasy pig, dancing, foot race, etc.," and the crowd was "imbued with the spirit of the occasion."

Roughly sixty years before Fazendeville was razed as part of the transformation of the Chalmette National Battlefield into the Chalmette National Historical Park, executives of the St. Louis–San Francisco Railway (known more commonly as the "Frisco Railroad") were reported by newspapers as participating in similar efforts which would have erased the village from Louisiana's landscape. In 1903, Frisco executives engaged in negotiations to purchase large tracts of land in St. Bernard Parish "up to the Orleans Parish line" as part of their plans of "gigantic scope" to further the expansion of the company's rail lines and operations facilities across Louisiana. "The Frisco road cannot obtain title to the National Cemetery, but is after all the rest of the river front, and wants to cross the present public road practically at grade in many public places," wrote one newspaper editor. As part of this plan, Frisco executives proposed relocating Fazendeville's residents to the much smaller, neighboring village of Versailles, which was described as a "settlement consist[ing] merely of a row of very small properties along a public road running at right angles from the river to the railroad track"; however, many of Fazendeville's residents resisted and then ultimately refused the railway's financial offers.

Among those who did sell to Frisco were "Homer Charles, proprietor of the Chalmette Grocery Store at Fazendeville, and the Charles' heirs who own[ed] property adjoining," according to New Orleans' Times-Picayune newspaper. The grocery was located "on the corner of Fazende Lane and the Levee." Per the agreement, Charles and his heirs were slated to "remain in possession until the Company [had] immediate use for the land."

In 1905, "Judge A.E. Livaudais, of the firm of Livaudais & Livaudais, presented a petition signed by the property holders and residents of Fazendeville, asking the Police Jury to provide for a right of way in the rear of the village, so that would not be cut off from the rest of the world," according to local newspaper reports. A committee of three was "appointed to investigate the matter."

Fazendeville's second Battle Ground Baptist Church was dedicated on Sunday, April 9, 1911.

On Sunday, September 28, 1919, Fazendeville church leaders hosted a Grand Celebration in the Progressive Hall to welcome home members of the village and parish who had served as soldiers and sailors during World War I.

=== 1920s ===
During its fall 1922 report, the St. Bernard Parish School Board noted that, when the Fazendeville School was visited by school board members as part of their tour of parish schools, board members had determined that conditions in the school were "more or less unsatisfactory, but cannot be remedied under present circumstances."

In January 1923, the Daughters of 1776-1815 lobbied the members of the St. Bernard Police Jury to replace the road between Fazendeville and the Chalmette Monument with a new public thoroughfare that would be maintained by the St. Bernard Parish government because the condition of the existing Southern Railroad-controlled private street had deteriorated so much that it had forced the postponement of the organization's annual commemoration of the Battle of New Orleans.

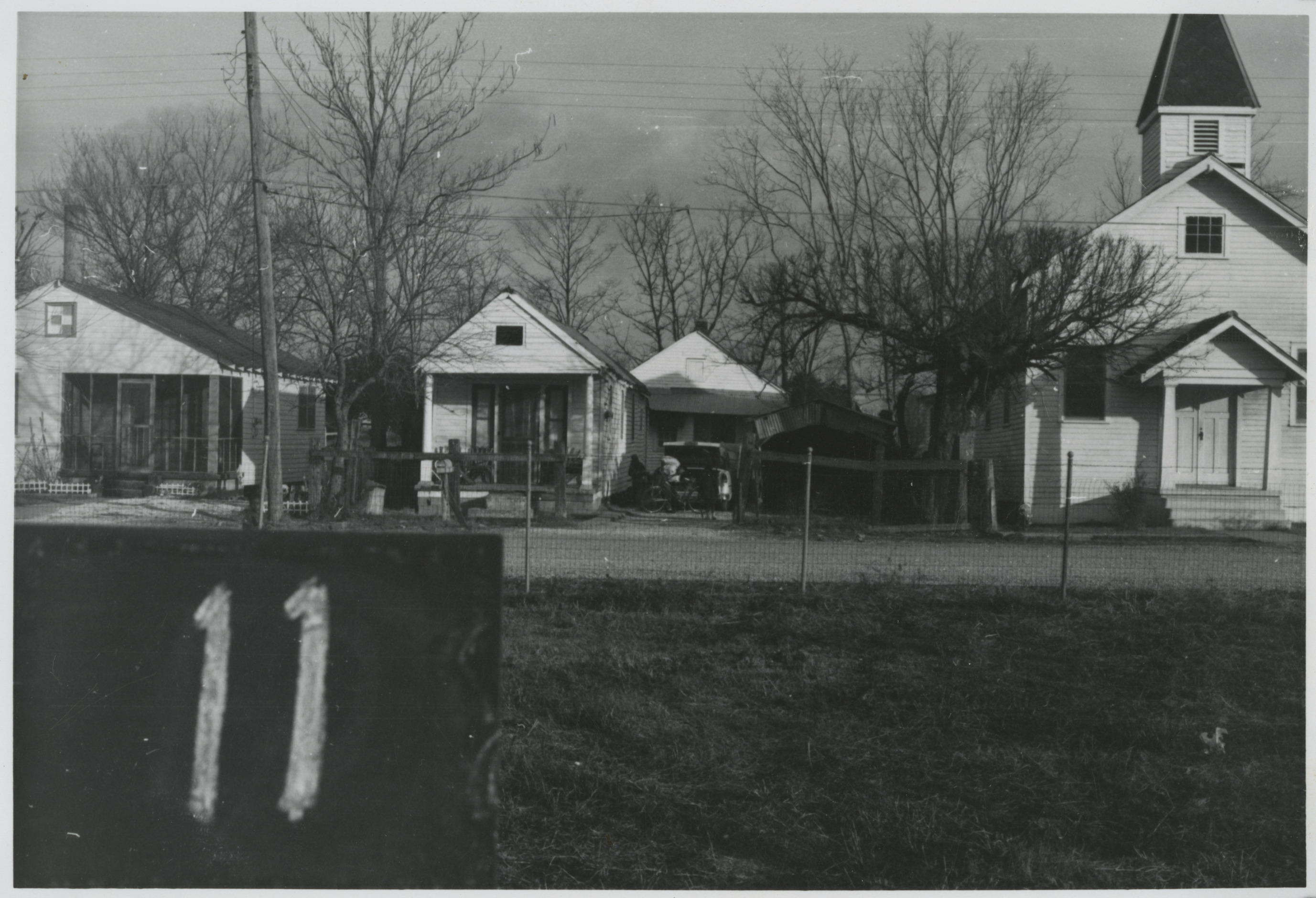
Battle Ground Baptist Church and neighboring shotgun-style houses, Fazendeville, Louisiana, 1960

On January 9, 1927, a major fire swept through the community, destroying the old Battle Ground Church, where new pews valued at $1,000 had recently been installed, seven automobiles, and eight houses, leaving roughly sixty people homeless, according to newspaper accounts of the event which stated that "the fire spread so rapidly that they did not have time to even save their personal effects." None of the homes or their contents were insured; the total loss was estimated at $25,000. The cornerstone for the new Battle Ground Baptist Church was laid on Sunday, October 14, 1928.

In October 1928, the St. Bernard Parish School Board reported that Fazendeville's school had begun the year with a total enrollment of 65 students.

=== 1930s ===
At its September 5, 1930, meeting, the Board of Commissioners of Water District No. 1, St. Bernard Parish, approved the installation of a two-inch water line "to serve consumers in Fazendeville Village, provided a reasonable number of applications for water could be procured."

In 1931, local newspapers reported that "options on the properties at Fazendeville were obtained as one of the preliminaries to the establishment of a national park on the Battlefield of Chalmette," adding that, while "[s]ome of the homes have changed hands ... they are, in the main, occupied ... by descendants of the original owners."

The congregation of the Battle Ground Baptist Church celebrated the church's 65th anniversary at a special ceremony in June 1933. The following year, the congregation experienced the second of two serious losses when its pastor, the Rev. John Minor, died from a stroke during his presentation of the Sunday sermon on September 30, 1924. Minor had been the immediate successor to the Rev. C.C. Cager, who had died several months earlier.

During the summer of 1939, elected officials and newspapers announced the "strong probability that the Chalmette National Park" would "become an actuality before long," suggesting that the village of Fazendeville would likely be "absorbed" because U.S. Congressman Joachim O. Fernández had secured the passage of legislation authorizing the government to acquire Fazendeville and other land near the Chalmette National Battlefield. After that legislation was vetoed by U.S. President Franklin D. Roosevelt, because "it was not the policy of the government to purchase land for national parks," Fernández continued to urge the Secretary of the Interior to acquire Fazendeville.

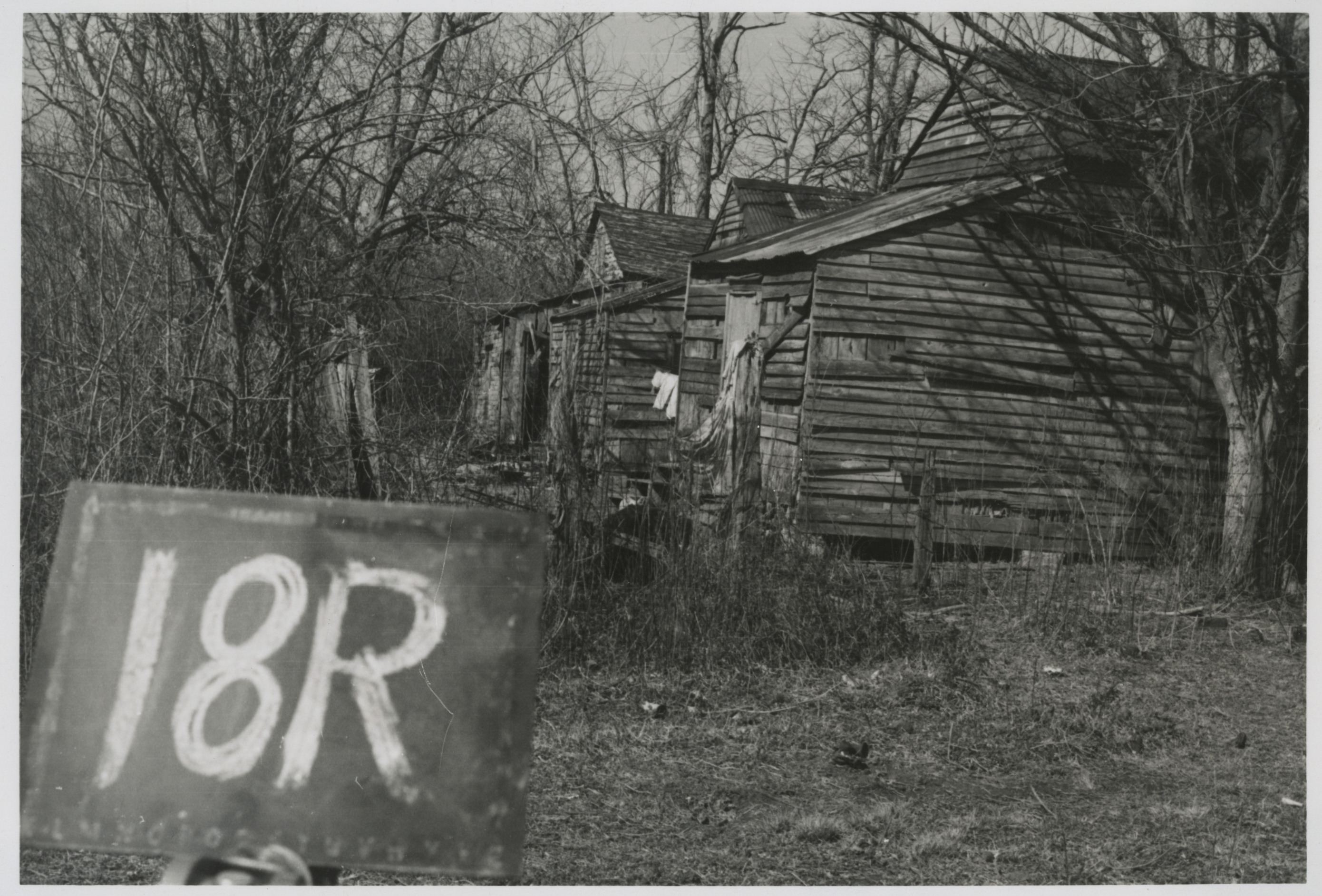
Laundry drying at an occupied cabin, Fazendeville, Louisiana, 1960

Among those playing a prominent role in advocating for the federal government's purchase of Fazendeville's land during this decade was the editor of The St. Bernard Voice. In its July 22, 1939, edition, The St. Bernard Voice observed, "The situation which the inhabitants of Fazendeville must eventually face is ... that they must bear segregation in mind—that is to say, the new village must be on a site that will meet with the approval of adjoining property holders," adding that "two sites have already been offered by A.P. Perrin and Albert Laburre, both on the wood-side of the main highway, the first in the rear of Arabi, and the latter at Versailles, but some distance away from Route 61." Perrin, "a real estate man of St. Bernard," and past "president of the St. Bernard Volunteer Fire Company," according to New Orleans' Times-Democrat newspaper, had been involved in an automobile-train collision twenty-six years earlier while taking "J. Carter of the Association of Commerce, and two others ... on a trip to Fazendeville to inspect some property in that neighborhood." The newspaper also reported that Perrin had "declined to give the names of the other two occupants, who were strangers here, explaining that they had made that request, fearing that their families would be uneasy when they read of the accident."

=== 1940s ===
During the fall of 1944, members of Fazendeville's Silver Star and Progressive Benevolent associations secured permission from St. Bernard Parish officials to build a new road from the village to the associations' cemetery in Versailles. By February 1948, thirty-six of the ninety-eight acres of land located between the Chalmette Monument and the national cemetery had been purchased as part of the land acquisition for the proposed national park expansion. The remaining sixty-two acres that had not yet been purchased included the village of Fazendeville.

A second major fire damaged the village further on January 30, 1949, when a kerosene heater exploded in the rear of Noemie Williams' home. Three double houses were destroyed by the blaze, which left six families homeless and without food, clothing, and personal possessions.

=== 1950s ===
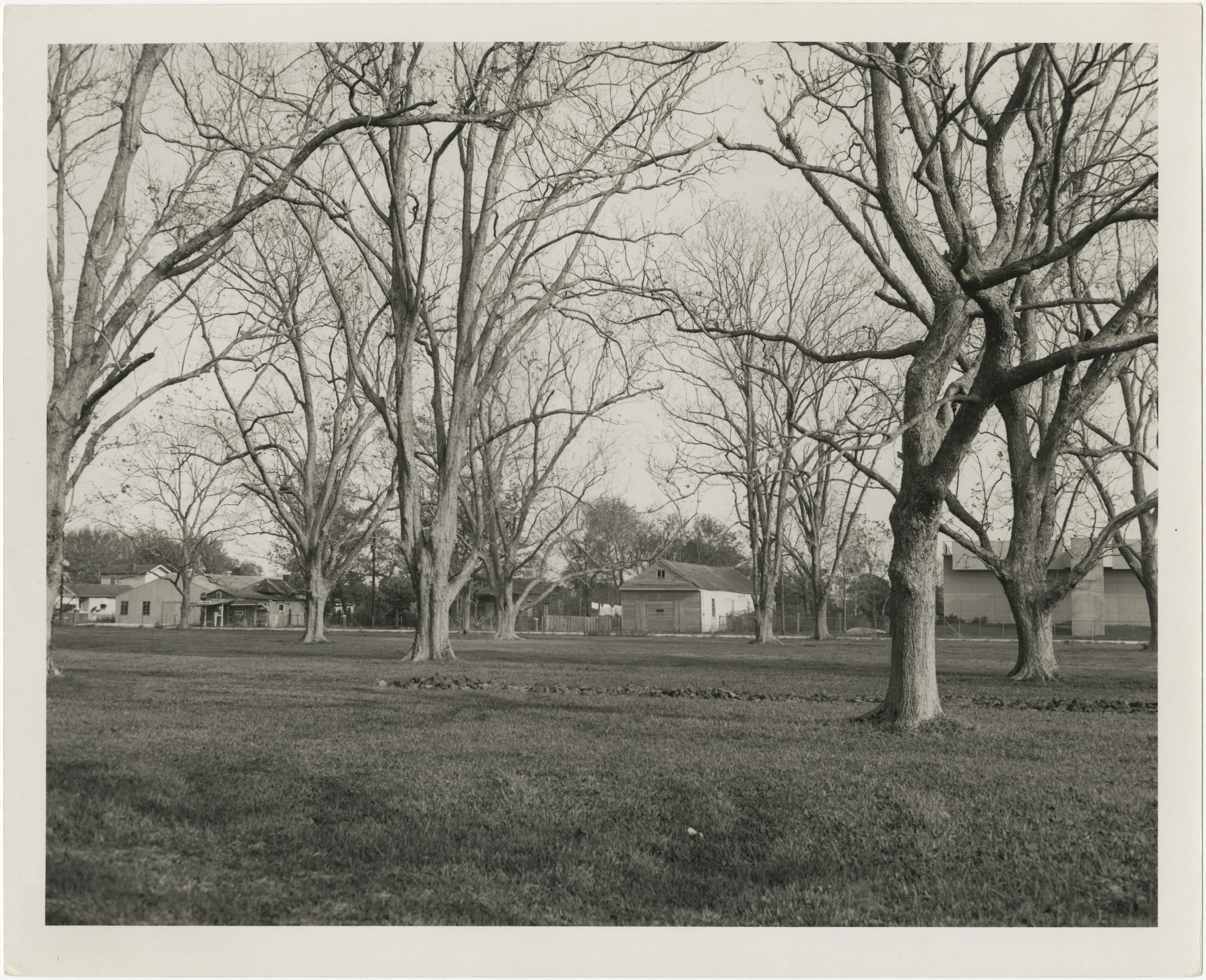
Fazendeville as seen from the American Rampart Line, 1958

During the summer of 1950, the St. Bernard Parish School Board announced that it was closing "[a]ll colored schools in the parish, except Verret," and that all of the students in those schools, including those at Fazendeville, would be "transported by bus to the new consolidated school at Violet." In 1953, newspapers across America reported on a mass Mississippi River baptism held in Fazendeville on Sunday morning, June 21. Officiating at the service were the president of the Southern District Baptist Association and members of the Battle Ground Baptist Church. That same decade, Mrs. Edwin X. deVerges, president of the Chalmette National Historical Park Association, lobbied members of the United States Congress to authorize "the appropriation necessary the purchase of the Fazendeville tract." The Kaiser Aluminum & Chemical Corporation also played an active role in facilitating the national park's formation by donating sixty-six acres of land adjacent to the Chalmette battlefield on April 18, 1959.

=== 1960s ===
On February 27, 1961, U.S. Congressman F. Edward Hébert "introduced a bill in Congress to establish a commission to celebrate the 150th Anniversary of the Battle of New Orleans." In addition to arranging for funding to support the battle's sesquicentennial ceremonies and a twenty-three member commission to oversee the planning of those events, which were slated for December 1964 and January 1965, Hébert's bill "provide[d] for the adding of about seven acres of land to the Chalmette National Historical Park ... in St. Bernard Parish." Newspapers reporting on the proposed legislation noted that the seven acres Hébert proposed acquiring for the project were "along the Fazendeville Lane from the St. Bernard Highway toward the Mississippi River on the Chalmette or lower side as the Arabi or upper side of Fazendeville," which were owned, at that time, "by a number of individuals, principally colored families." Hébert added that he had introduced his proposed bill "at the request of Mrs. Martha Robinson, chairman of the Louisiana Historic Landmarks Council and president of the Louisiana Landmarks Society."

On October 12, 1962, The St. Bernard Voice reported that U.S. President John F. Kennedy "signed into law the resolution creating a commission for the Sesquicentennial Celebration of the Battle of New Orleans and to authorize the purchase of land along Fazendeville Road for the Chalmette National Historical Park."

=== End of the community ===
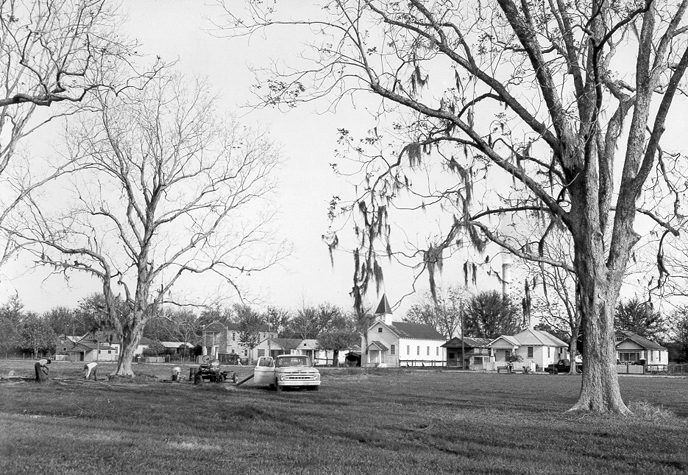
Fazendeville, Louisiana, early 1960s

The community ended in 1964 when the St. Bernard Parish Government expropriated the rights to the land for expansion of the park around the battlefield site. Allegations were made at the time (and continue to be made) that the expropriation was motivated at least as much to displace the Parish's largest concentration of Black residents as for need to expand the park.

More than 50 families were forced to relocate when the National Park Service obtained the land. Fazendeville Road was closed on November 25, 1964, and the demolition of Fazendeville was completed in 1966.

"In the mid-1960s, the market price for a new home in St. Bernard was around $19,000," according to radio producer Eve Abrams; "residents of Fazendeville received around $4,000 per home."

Many of those families relocated to the Lower 9th Ward of New Orleans, and built a new "Battleground Baptist Church" there in 1964. That area was severely damaged in Hurricane Betsy in 1965 and even more so by the Hurricane Katrina levee failure disaster of 2005. A significant percentage of the village's displaced residents resettled in New Orleans' Ninth Ward.

=== Present day ===
During the early years of the twenty-first century, cultural anthropologist and ethnomusicologist Joyce Marie Jackson, PhD, was hired by the United States National Park Service to research, document and write a cultural and historical study of the village of Fazendeville. Completed in 2003, the study included multiple oral histories recorded by Jackson with former residents and descendants of former residents of the village and resulted in the United States Department of the Interior's publication of Jackson's Life in the Village: A Cultural Memory of the Fazendeville Community. Jackson, who then published "Declaration of Taking Twice: The Fazendeville Community of the Lower Ninth Ward," in American Anthropologist in 2006, was subsequently awarded the James J. Parsons Endowed Professor and Chair of the department of geography and anthropology at Louisiana State University. In 2021, Jackson was recognized by the Louisiana Endowment for the Humanities for her Fazendeville research and writing and her enhancement of the understanding of African American culture and music, sacred and secular rituals in Africa and the diaspora with the endowment's Lifetime Contributions to the Humanities award.

In the spring of 2020, park rangers and members of the Louisiana Iris Conservation Initiative noticed that Louisiana iris and African lilies were blooming on the battlefield. After further investigation, they determined that those particular flowers could not have been growing wild because they were not native to the area, and theorized that the flowers might have been brought from Africa by enslaved people and planted there when Fazendville was still an active and thriving community.

In 2020 and 2021, assistant professor John Seefeldt and a team of researchers from Loyola University New Orleans worked with personnel from the National Park Service to analyze archival photographs and maps of Fazendeville and use a 3d printer to construct a model of the village. Their plan was to create an interactive exhibit at the Chalmette National Battlefield to include interviews with descendants of the village's former residents and a virtual reality program.

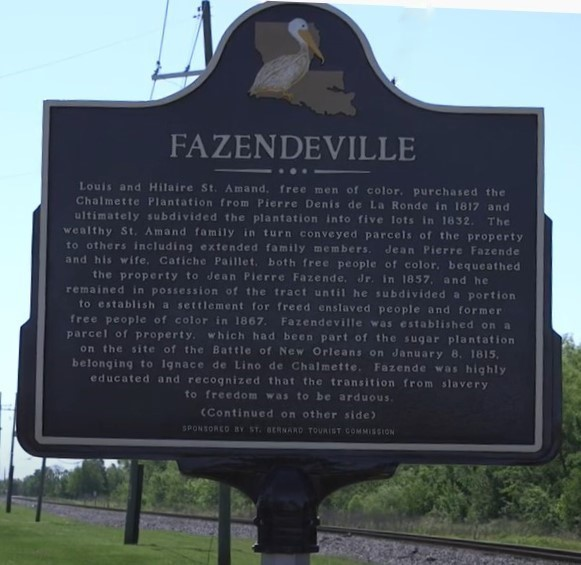
State of Louisiana's historical marker commemorating the former village of Fazendeville (Chalmette National Battlefield entrance, St. Bernard Highway)

On April 19, 2021, former residents of Fazendeville and descendants of original residents of the village participated in dedication ceremonies for a new state historical marker on St. Bernard Highway at the entrance of the Chalmette Battlefield. Funds for the marker were provided by the St. Bernard Tourist Commission and the St. Bernard Parish Office of Tourism and Film. The event was hosted by Bishop Henry Ballard, Jr. of Christian Fellowship Family Worship; Elois Brooks of the Battle Ground Baptist Church delivered the invocation. Additional presenters included St. Bernard Parish historian William Hyland and U.S. Congressman Ray Garofalo.

In a Spring 2022 article in St. Bernard Magazine, a representative of the U.S. National Park Service noted that visitors to the former village will likely notice that "only a slight depression is visible in the battlefield where the street that ran through Fazendeville was laid."

In October 2022, WLAE-TV aired a documentary about the village, "Battlegrounds: The Lost Community of Fazendeville." As part of its educational outreach for the program, the public television presented a special screening of the documentary at the St. Bernard Docville Farm in Violet on October 30. The event was supported by the Mereux Foundation.

From December 9, 2022, to January 29, 2023, the Ogden Museum of Southern Art presented "Black Alchemy: Remembering Fazendeville," an exhibit of photographs of the village and its former residents, which was created by Arkansas-based photographer-educator Aaron Turner in collaboration with Richard McCabe, Ogden's curator of photography. The exhibit was supported by the Darryl Chappell Foundation.

== See also ==
- Freedmen's Cemetery
- Jean Lafitte National Historic Park and Preserve
- List of ghost towns in Louisiana
