= Joyce Marie Jackson =

American cultural anthropologist, ethnomusicologist and folklorist

- Born: Louisiana, United States
- Occupations: James J. Parsons endowed professor and chair, department of geography & anthropology, Louisiana State University
- Known for: Recipient of the Louisiana Endowment for the Humanities Lifetime Contributions to the Humanities award for her enhancement of the understanding of African American culture and music, sacred and secular rituals in Africa and the diaspora
- Spouse: J. Nash Porter

Joyce Marie Jackson is the James J. Parsons Endowed Professor and chair of the department of geography and anthropology at Louisiana State University in Baton Rouge, Louisiana. A cultural anthropologist, ethnomusicologist and folklorist, she was also the director of the university's African and African American studies program from 2010 to 2016.

In 2021, she was recognized by the Louisiana Endowment for the Humanities with its Lifetime Contributions to the Humanities award for her enhancement of the understanding of African American culture and music, sacred and secular rituals in Africa and the diaspora.

== Formative years and family ==
Jackson spent her formative years in Baton Rouge, Louisiana, where her father worked for Exxon (now ExxonMobil) and her mother worked as an academic and administrator at Southern University. A graduate of Southern University's laboratory school, Jackson entered Louisiana State University in 1968, and subsequently earned Bachelor of Music and Master of Music degrees before pursuing research studies in African American music at Atlanta University. She then earned her Doctor of Philosophy degree in ethnomusicology at Indiana University Bloomington.

Married to documentary photographer J. Nash Porter, she was widowed by him in October 2007. The mother of one daughter, she also has five grandchildren.

== Academic career ==
From 1980 to 1981, Jackson was employed as a graduate assistant with the Archives of Traditional Music at Indiana University in Bloomington, where she evaluated and accessioned music submitted to the department's recording studio. She was also an associate instructor with the university's ethnomusicology department, and taught "World Folk Music Traditions" during this time.

From 1982 to 1983, she provided consulting services to the William Ransom Hogan Jazz Archives at Tulane University in New Orleans, Louisiana, where she catalogued the archives' gospel collection and organized a gospel music conference.

Subsequently hired by Louisiana State University, she rose through the academic ranks from assistant to associate to full professor, beginning in 1987. An educator who has taught courses in cultural anthropology, ethnomusicology and folklore, she was appointed as an affiliate professor of African & African American Studies in 1994, as an affiliate professor of Women, Gender & Sexuality Studies in 1996, and as director of LSU's African & African American Studies program from 2010 to 2016.

Her research has included investigations of African American religious music, the ways in which the Afro-French diaspora influenced the culture and history of Louisiana, Bahamian sacred rituals, the cultural traditions and legacy of Haitian immigrants in Louisiana, the healing rituals of Senegalese women, the Mardi Gras Indian traditions of masquerade and music in New Orleans, the Mississippi Delta's influence on the community of Winnsboro, Louisiana, including that community's Easter Rock folklife, southern Louisiana's coastal jazz history, and Trinidad's Carnival. She has also conducted long-term research on African-American jubilee and gospel quartets, examining their development from barbershop and spiritual traditions and their social role in Black community life.

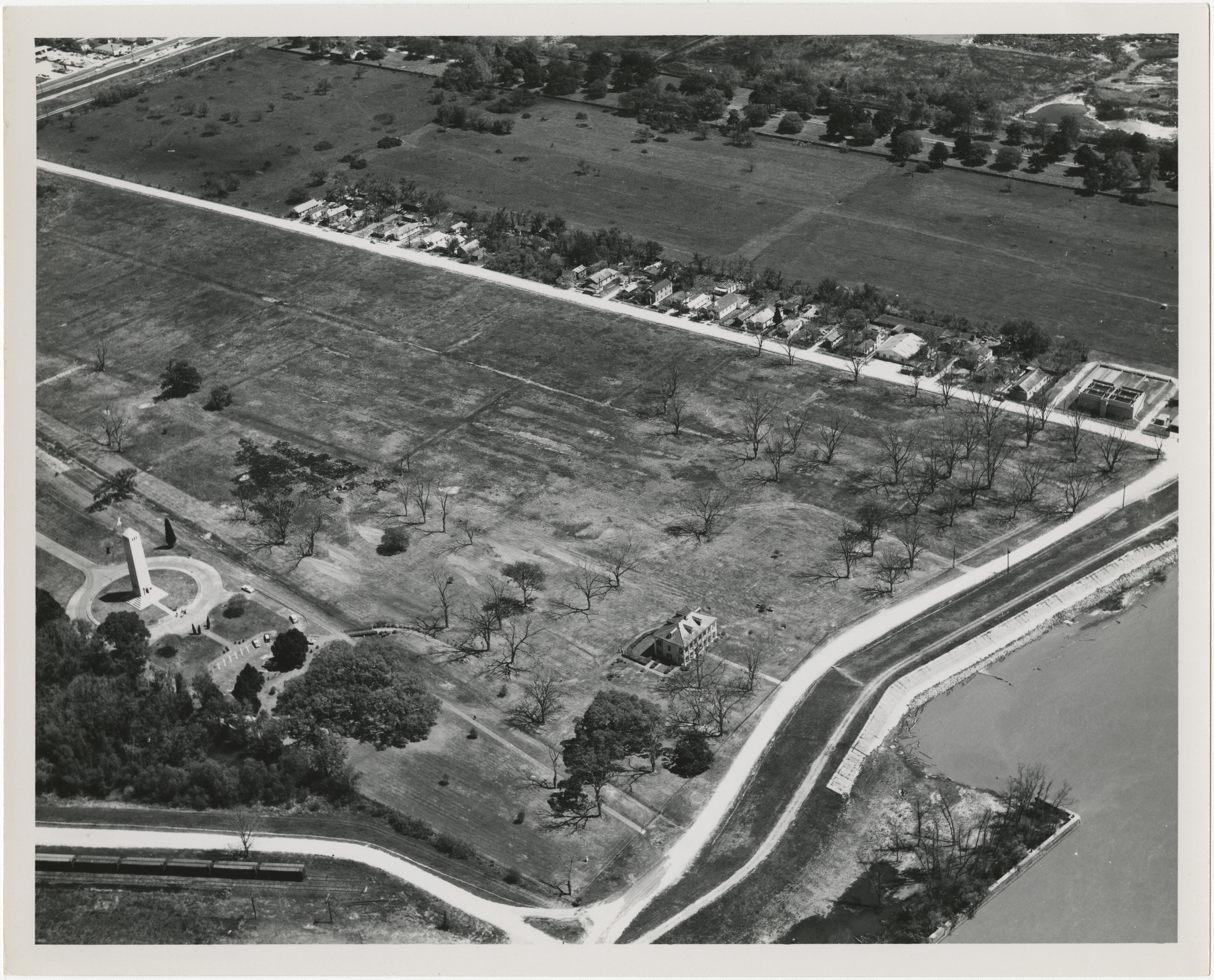
1963 aerial view photo of Chalmette National Park and Fazendeville, Louisiana used by Joyce Marie Jackson for her 2006 American Anthropologist article, "Declaration of Taking Twice"

During the early years of the twenty-first century, Jackson was hired by the United States National Park Service to research, document and write a cultural and historical study of the village of the historic African American village of Fazendeville, Louisiana, which was razed during the 1960s to facilitate expansion of the Chalmette National Battlefield in the Jean Lafitte National Historic Park and Preserve. Completed in 2003, the study included multiple oral histories recorded by Jackson with former residents and descendants of former residents of the village and resulted in the United States Department of the Interior's publication of Jackson's Life in the Village: A Cultural Memory of the Fazendeville Community.

Jackson then published "Declaration of Taking Twice: The Fazendeville Community of the Lower Ninth Ward," in American Anthropologist in 2006.

Named as the Brij Mohan Distinguished Professor of Social Justice in 2015, she was then appointed as an affiliate professor of International Studies in 2016 and was named the James J. Parsons Endowed Professor and chair of the department of geography and anthropology at Louisiana State University in 2021.

That same year, Jackson was also awarded the LSU Faculty Diversity, Equity, & Inclusion Mentoring Award by the university, and was recognized by the Louisiana Endowment for the Humanities for her enhancement of the understanding of African American culture and music, sacred and secular rituals in Africa and the diaspora with the endowment's Lifetime Contributions to the Humanities award.

== Charitable giving and public service activities ==
During the early part of the twenty-first century, Jackson organized teams of Louisiana State University students to assist with the disaster recovery efforts of community organizations and other New Orleans-area nonprofits after Hurricane Katrina struck southeastern Louisiana in 2005.

She then undertook similar volunteer recovery work with LSU students in Haiti following the 2010 earthquake there.

The founder of Cultural Crossroads, Inc., a nonprofit whose mission is to support and enhance the artistic and cultural expressions of people of African descent while raising awareness of the Black diaspora, Jackson continues to serve as the organization's president.

== Publications ==
- "African American Gospel Music in Louisiana." Eunice, Louisiana: The Eunice News, September 29, 1991, pp. 19–24 (subscription required).
- "Declaration of Taking Twice: The Fazendeville Community of the Lower Ninth Ward Empowering Place" in American Anthropologist, Volume 108, Number 4, pages 766–780. Arlington, Virginia: American Anthropological Association, December 2006.
- "Easter Rock," "Mardi Gras Indians" and "Quartets, African American," (three essays) in The New Encyclopedia of Southern Culture (Folklore Volume), Glen Hinson and William Ferris, editors. Chapel Hill, North Carolina: University of North Carolina Press, 2009.
- "The Gospel Caravan," in Ain't Nothing Like the Real Thing: How the Apollo Theater Shaped American Entertainment, Richard Carlin and Kinshasha Holman Conwill, editors. Washington, D.C.: Smithsonian Institution Books, 2010.
- Life in the Village: A Cultural Memory of the Fazendeville Community. Washington D.C.: U.S. Department of the Interior, National Historical Park, 2003.
- "The Paschall Brothers: On the Right Road Now" (liner note booklet with track notes, citations, a bibliography, and CD). Washington, D.C.: Smithsonian Folkways Recordings CD 40176, 2007.
- "Rockin' and Rushin' for Christ: Hidden Transcripts in Diasporic Ritual Performance," in "Caribbean and Southern: Transnational Perspectives on the U.S. South," in Anthropological Proceedings, Volume 38, Helen Regis, editor. Athens, Georgia: University of Georgia Press, 2006.
- With Fehintola Mosadomi: "Cultural Continuity: Masking Traditions of the Black Mardi Gras Indians and the Yoruba Egungun, in Orisa: Yoruba Gods and Spiritual Identity," Toyin Falola, editor. Trenton, New Jersey: African World Press, 2005.
- "Working Both Sides of the Fence: African American Sacred Quartets Enter Realm of Popular Culture." Bridging Southern Cultures: An Interdisciplinary Approach, John Lowe, editor. Baton Rouge, Louisiana: LSU Press, 2005.

== See also ==
- Fazendeville, Louisiana
