= Sarah Rosetta Wakeman =

American female soldier who served in the American Civil War

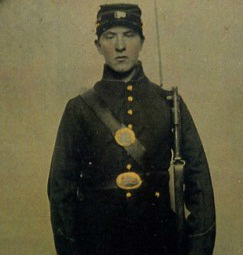
- Wakeman c. 1860s
- Born: Sarah Rosetta Wakeman; January 16, 1843; Chenango County, New York, US
- Died: June 19, 1864 (aged 21); Marine USA General Hospital in New Orleans
- Military career
- Allegiance: United States
- Branch: Union army
- Unit: 153rd New York Volunteer Infantry
- Conflicts: American Civil War

Sarah Rosetta Wakeman (January 16, 1843 – June 19, 1864) was an American female soldier who served in the Union army during the American Civil War under the male name of Lyons Wakeman. Wakeman served with Company H, 153rd New York Volunteer Infantry. Her letters written during her service remained unread for nearly a century because they were stored in the attic of her relatives.

== Early life ==
Wakeman was born January 16, 1843, in Bainbridge, New York, to Harvey Anable Wakeman and Emily Hale Wakeman. She was the oldest of nine children in the farming family of Afton, New York. By the age of seventeen, she had received some formal education and was working as a domestic servant. Wakeman understood the tremendous financial pressure her family was under, and without possible suitors to take on her expenses, Wakeman left her home as a man in 1862 and went to work as a boatman for the Chenango Canal. Wakeman's letters to her family allude to some sort of rift between them before her departure.

While on her job, she met army recruiters offering a $152 bounty and enlisted on August 30, 1862, using the name Lyons Wakeman and claiming to be 21 years old. The bounty would have been incredible motivation for Wakeman to enlist, being far more than what she could earn as a woman. Wakeman enlisted as a private of Company H of the 153rd New York State Volunteers in Root, New York. The description on her enlistment papers stated that she was five feet tall, fair-skinned, brown hair with blue eyes. She misrepresented her age on the papers which stated that she was twenty-one at the time of her enlistment when in fact she was actually seventeen or eighteen.

== Military service ==
Her regiment was assigned guard duty in Alexandria, Virginia, and later in Washington, DC, to protect the nation's food. Despite the often tedious camp life and challenging conditions of life as a soldier, Wakeman wrote that "I liked to be a soldier very well." Much down time potentially gave Wakeman time to write her numerous letters. The first letter Wakeman sent home contained information about why she left home and what she was doing. Wakeman often sent money home in the hope of making amends. She used her birth name when signing her correspondence; if her letters had been intercepted, this act could have ended her military career. Wakeman often wrote about being financially independent, something many women of the time wanted. Over her years of service, Wakeman sent numerous and regular letters to her family, providing a narrative of her life during the service. She was religious, and her faith comforted her during challenging times. Despite occasional turmoil, she was proud to be a "good soldier".

One point of interest in Wakeman's service is her time spent as a guard at Washington's Carroll Prison. During her time there, one of the three women held at the prison was arrested for a crime Wakeman herself was committing: impersonating a man to fight for the Union.

Wakeman finally saw battle as the 153rd Regiment was transferred to an active battlefield in February 1864. Her unit participated in Major General Nathaniel P. Banks' ill-fated Red River Campaign. The battle that ensued took place at Pleasant Hill, Louisiana. This force probably numbered around 11,000 soldiers. Wakeman survived her only apparent combat engagement on April 9, 1864. After Wakeman's arrival, she sent her last letter home from the Grand Ecore Landing on the Red River.

The last letter Wakeman sent reported her battle experiences: "Our army made an advance up the river to Pleasant Hill about 40 miles (64 km). There we had a fight. The first day of the fight our army got whip[ped] and we had to retreat back about 10 miles (16 km). The next day the fight was renewed and the firing took place about eight o'clock in the morning. There was a heavy Cannonading all day and a Sharp firing of infantry. I was not in the first day's fight, but the next day I had to face the enemy bullets with my regiment. I was under fire about four hours and laid on the field of battle all night. There was three wounded in my Co. and one killed. I feel thankful to God that he spared my life, and I pray to him that he will lead me safe through the field of battle and that I may return safe home."

== Death and legacy ==
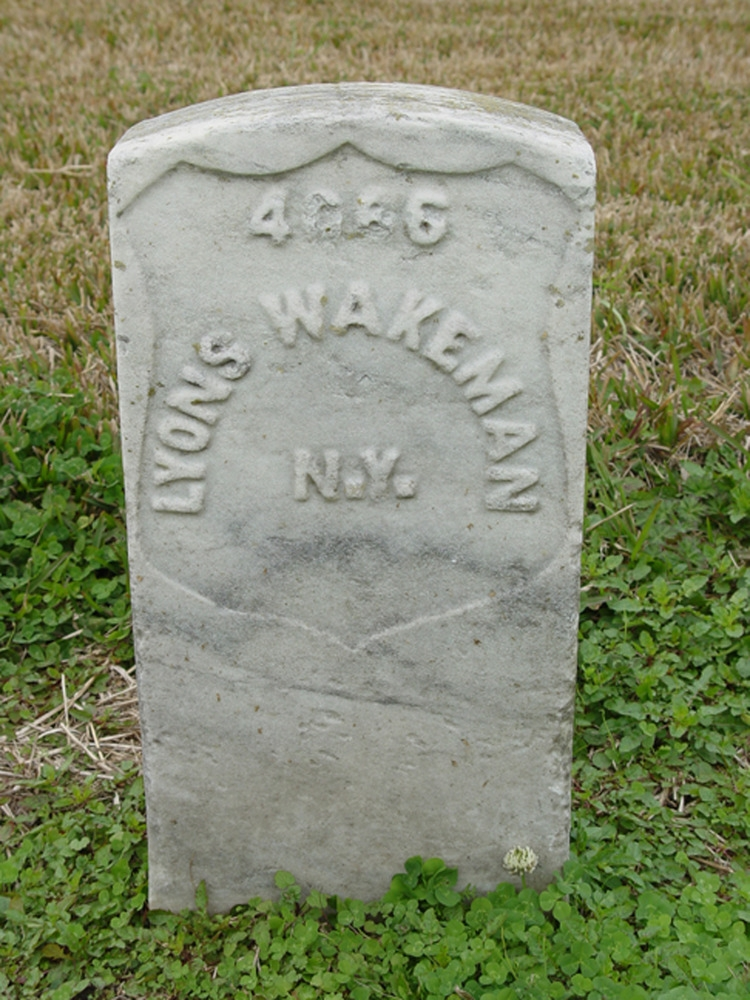
Pvt. Lyons Wakeman headstone in the Chalmette National Cemetery

The Red River Campaign claimed several lives including Wakeman's own. She contracted chronic diarrhea of which she eventually died on June 19, 1864, in the Marine USA General Hospital in New Orleans. Wakeman was not the only one to meet such an end; thousands of Union soldiers were killed by drinking water contaminated by rotting animals. Wakeman's identity was not revealed during her burial; her headstone reads "Lyons Wakeman." She was buried with full military honors at Chalmette National Cemetery in New Orleans.

Her letters and their record of her military experiences were discovered more than a century after her death in a relative's attic in 1976. Wakeman's letters were subsequently edited and published by Lauren Burgess in 1994 as An Uncommon Soldier: The Civil War Letters of Sarah Rosetta Wakeman, alias Pvt. Lyons Wakeman, 153rd Regiment, New York State Volunteers, 1862–1864. Her relatives still have the letters, a photograph, and a ring of Wakeman's.

== See also ==
- List of female American Civil War soldiers
