= Chalmette National Cemetery =

Historic veterans cemetery in Louisiana, US

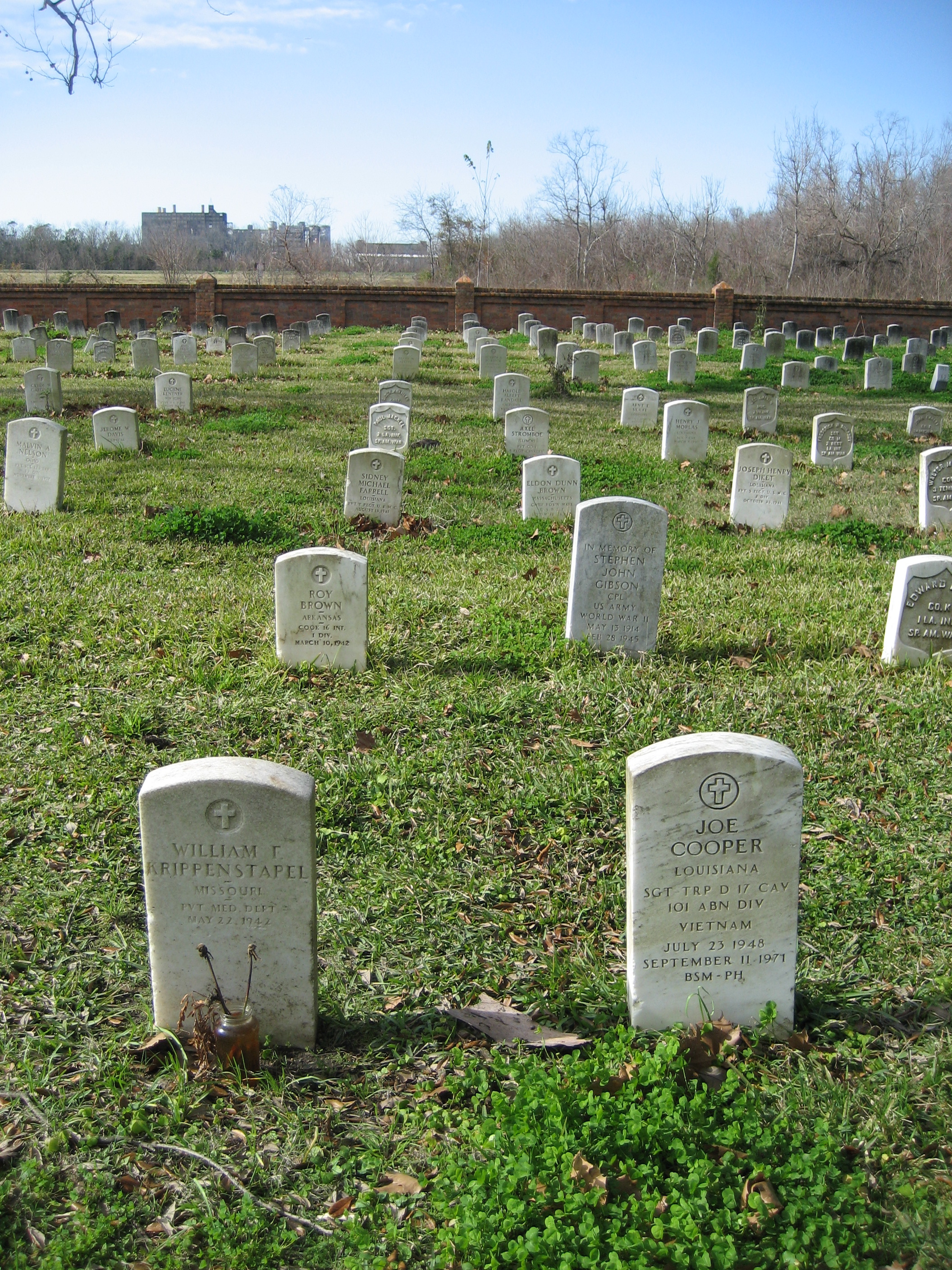
- Headstones at the cemetery
- Interactive map of Chalmette National Cemetery

Details
- Established: 1864
- Location: 8606 West Saint Bernard Highway; Chalmette, Louisiana
- Country: United States
- Type: United States National Cemetery
- Size: 17.5-acre (7.1 ha)
- No. of graves: 15,300
- Website: Chalmette National Cemetery
- Chalmette Unit of Jean Lafitte National Historical Park Historic District
- U.S. National Register of Historic Places
- U.S. Historic district
- Location within Louisiana Location within the United States
- Nearest city: New Orleans, Louisiana
- Coordinates: 29°56′28″N 89°59′17″W
- Area: 142.9 acres (57.8 ha)
- Built: 1814
- NRHP reference No.: 66000889
- Added to NRHP: October 15, 1966

Chalmette National Cemetery is a United States National Cemetery located within Jean Lafitte National Historical Park and Preserve in Chalmette, Louisiana. The cemetery is a 17.5-acre (7.1 ha) graveyard adjacent to the site that was once the battleground of the Battle of New Orleans, which took place at the end of the War of 1812. Despite its proximity to the site of the Battle of New Orleans in the War of 1812, the majority of the interments are of soldiers who were casualties or veterans of the American Civil War, the Spanish-American War, World War I, World War II, the Korean War, or the Vietnam War. The cemetery was subsequently closed to new interments.

== Description ==
The Chalmette National Cemetery is a rectangular parcel of land measuring 250 feet by 2200 feet. It runs from the Mississippi River on the south to West Saint Bernard Highway (Louisiana Highway 46) on the north. The Chalmette National Battlefield bounds the cemetery on the west, while there is an industrial manufacturing facility on the east. Military Cemetery Road runs the length of the grounds from the entrance at West Saint Bernard Highway to the levee along the Mississippi River. The cemetery's headquarters are near the entrance of the cemetery grounds. The Monument to the Grand Army of the Republic is at the opposite end of Military Cemetery Road, which runs lengthwise through the center of the cemetery.

Though now closed to new interments, it is the final resting place of over 15,300 veterans and casualties of American military campaigns starting with the American Civil War and extending to the Vietnam War. There are also four graves of War of 1812 soldiers, one of whom participated in the Battle of New Orleans. There are approximately 7000 unknown soldiers buried there, mostly soldiers who died in the American Civil War. Graves at Chalmette National Cemetery range from simple square markers to elaborate monuments.

John E. Jones (1834–1865), Civil War Medal of Honor Recipient, is buried there. Also buried is William H. Morgan (1825–1878), a Civil War Union Brevet Brigadier General.

Sarah Rosetta Wakeman (1843–1864) is buried at Chalmette National Cemetery. She enlisted in the Union Army of the Civil War disguised as a man, under the name Lyons Wakeman. She died of disease, not combat, in New Orleans in 1864. One British seaman, able seaman Watcyn G. Jones, of the Royal Navy is among the war dead from World War II buried at Chalmette National Cemetery.

== History ==
Chalmette National Cemetery was originally known as Monument Cemetery. It had been used as a burial ground prior to its establishment as a national cemetery. In the early part of the American Civil War, former slaves were buried at the site as were both Confederate and Union troops.

In 1862, the federal government of the United States created the system of national cemeteries. Its purpose was to provide cemeteries for soldiers who died in service of the nation and included the acquisition of land. Chalmette National Cemetery was established as a United States National Cemetery in 1864 as a place to inter the Union troops. Even though Louisiana was part of the Confederate States of America, nearby New Orleans was occupied by the Union Army for the majority of the conflict, which is there was need for a Union cemetery in the New Orleans area.

Originally some Confederate soldiers were buried there but were moved to the now defunct Cypress Grove #2 Cemetery by the Ladies of the Benevolent Association of New Orleans. After the Civil War, makeshift battlefield burial plots around the state had their interments moved to the more permanent national cemeteries. The remains of nearly 12,000 soldiers were moved to Chalmette National Cemetery at that time, many of whom were unknown soldiers. At about the same time, the remains of approximately 7000 African-American civilians that were buried on the grounds of Chalmette National Cemetery were reinterred at the adjacent Freedmen's Cemetery. Other civilians were also buried there in the early history of Chalmette National Cemetery, although this practice was discontinued in 1867.

During the early 1960s, the historic community of Fazendeville was demolished in order to expand the battlefield in preparation for the commemoration of the 150th anniversary of the Battle of New Orleans, which took place in 1965. The town, which had been established sometime around 1870 by Jean-Pierre Fazende, had been "founded as a home for newly freed slaves," according to news reports. The cemetery, as part of the Chalmette National Historical Park, was transferred to the stewardship of the National Park Service in 1933. Local, state and federal elected officials had been engaged in efforts to acquire the community's lands since at least the early 1930s.

The cemetery and battlefield were listed on the National Register of Historic Places on October 15, 1966. The cemetery and battlefield became part of the Jean Lafitte National Historical Park and Preserve in 1978.

=== Floral design ===
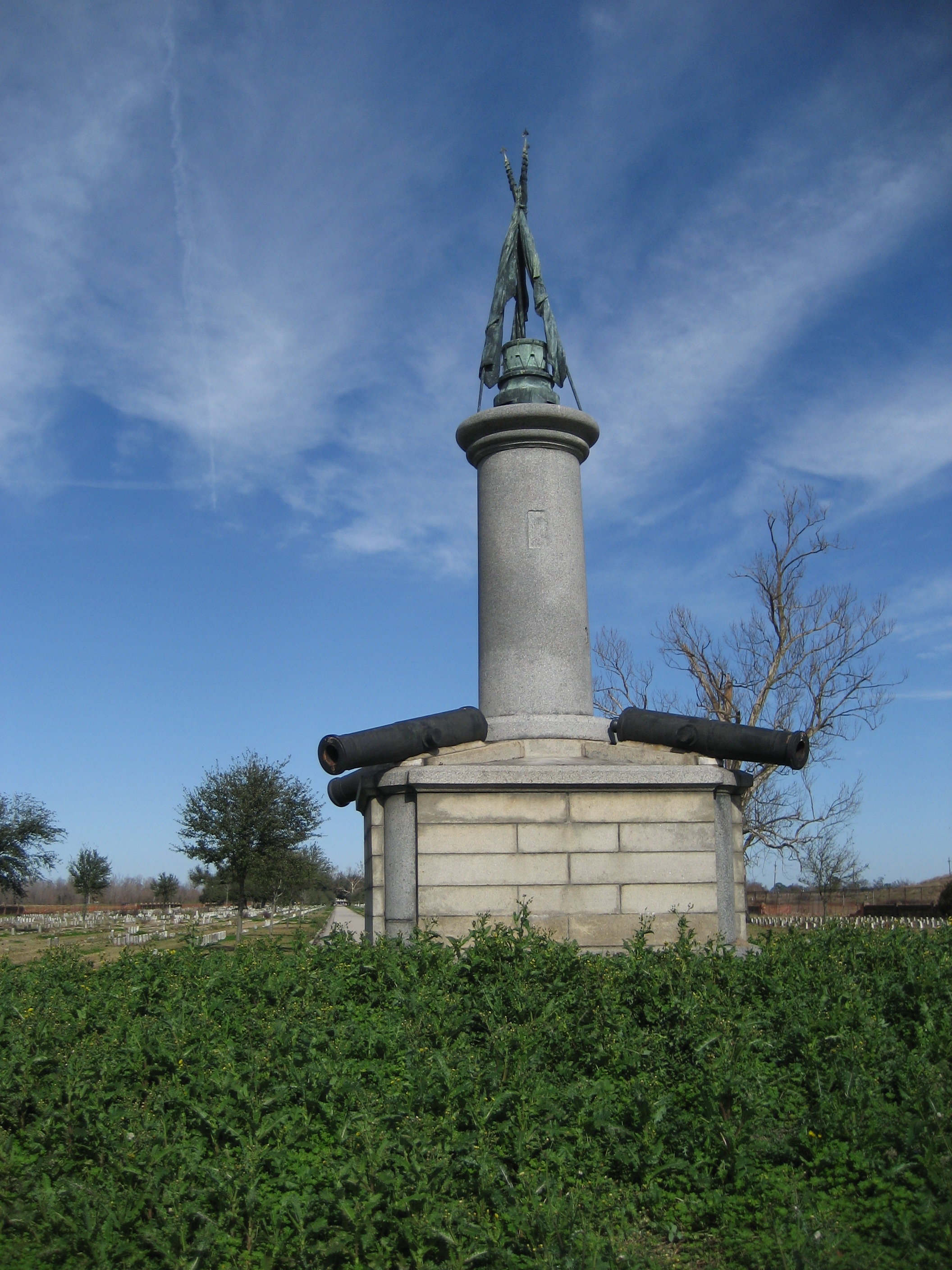
Civil War Monument at Chalmette National Cemetery

Consistent with widespread interest in the language of flowers during the late 19th century in the United States, designers of the cemetery made extensive use of landscaping to honor the deceased. These plants and trees in the 19th century landscaping of the cemetery included arbor vitae, cedar, magnolias, weeping willows, roses, olive trees, sago palms, and laurels, each species having symbolic value.

=== Changes to layout ===
The original entrance to the Chalmette National Cemetery was from the Mississippi River, as visitors typically arrived and departed by boat. By 1910, a railroad and a highway had been constructed at the northern end of the cemetery. The main entrance to the cemetery was moved to the northern end at that time.

The levees at the riverside of the cemetery were widened following the Great Mississippi Flood of 1927. This expansion necessitated that the remains of approximately 400 soldiers had to be relocated, to a mass grave. The superintendent's house at the Mississippi River side of the cemetery was demolished and replaced by two smaller buildings near the new entrance to the cemetery.

Chalmette National Cemetery suffered considerable damage in 2005 due to Hurricane Katrina and also Hurricane Rita, with the toppling of headstones and much of the perimeter wall. The days and times that the park and cemetery were open to the public were limited for several years afterward. Previously, Hurricane Betsy and Hurricane Camille had damaged the cemetery, especially the foliage.

== Gallery ==
Chalmette Battlefield map showing the Chalmette National Cemetery (courtesy of the National Park Service)

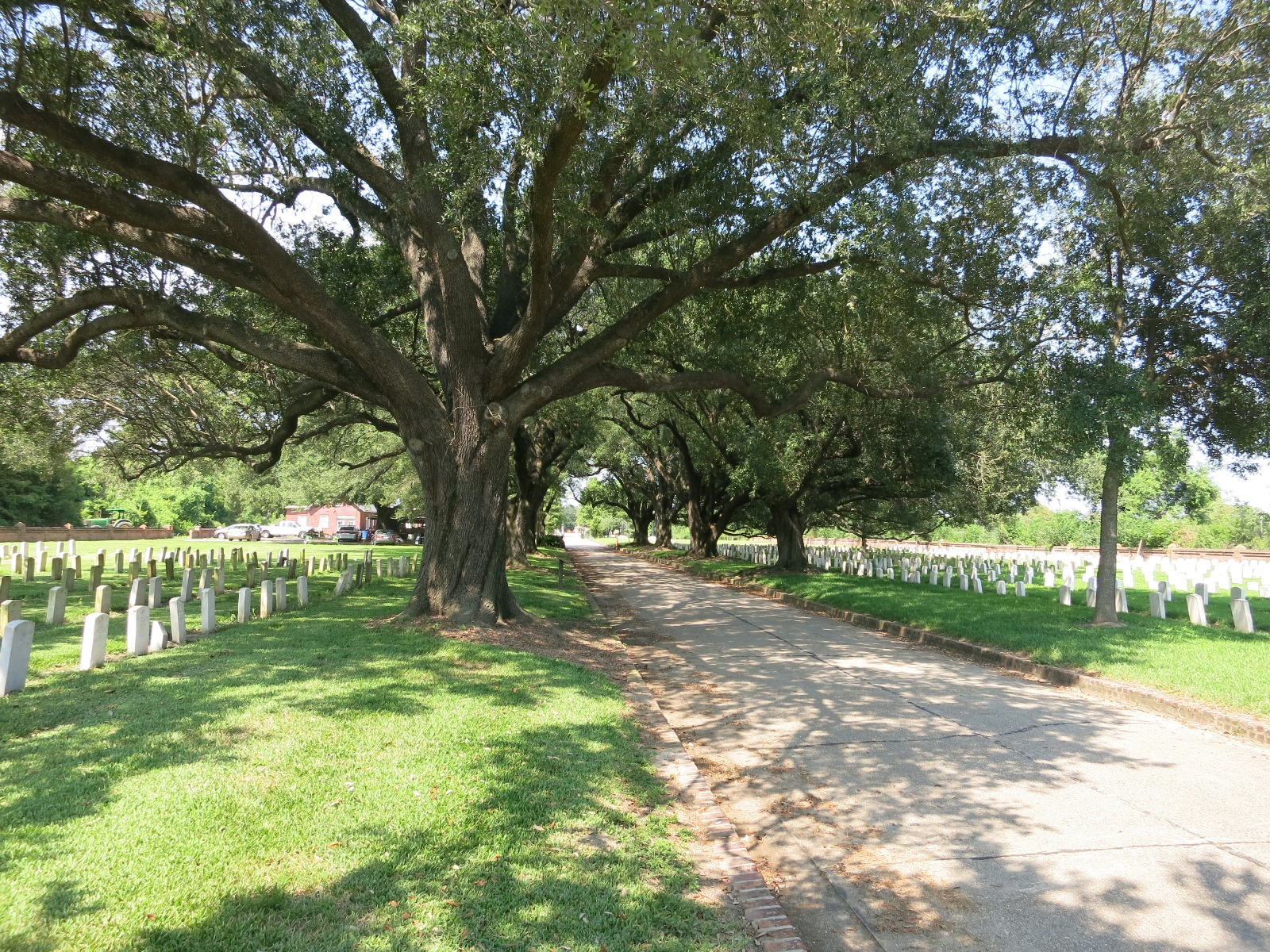
Old trees along Military Cemetery Road

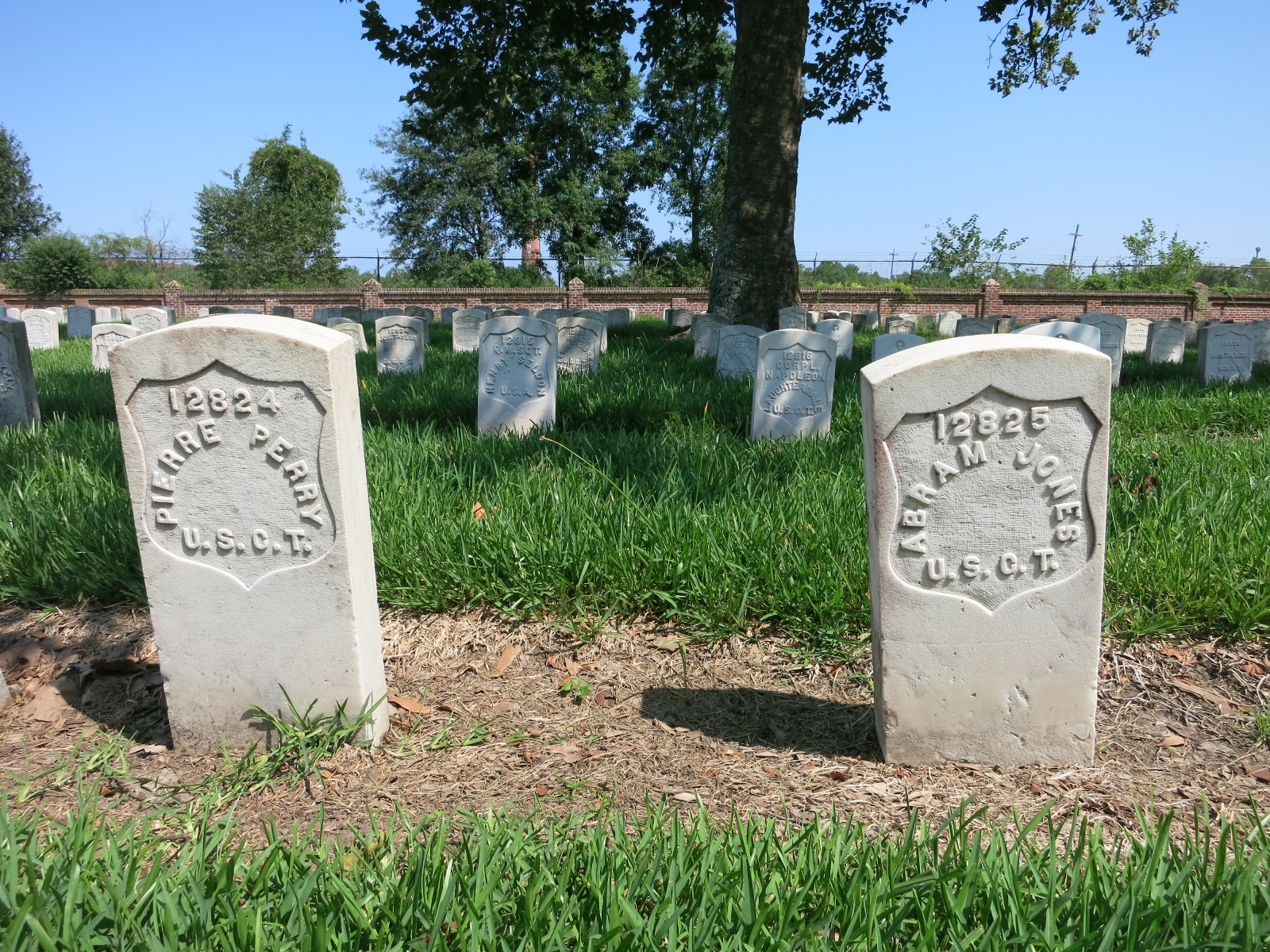
Two graves of United States Colored Troops (USCT)

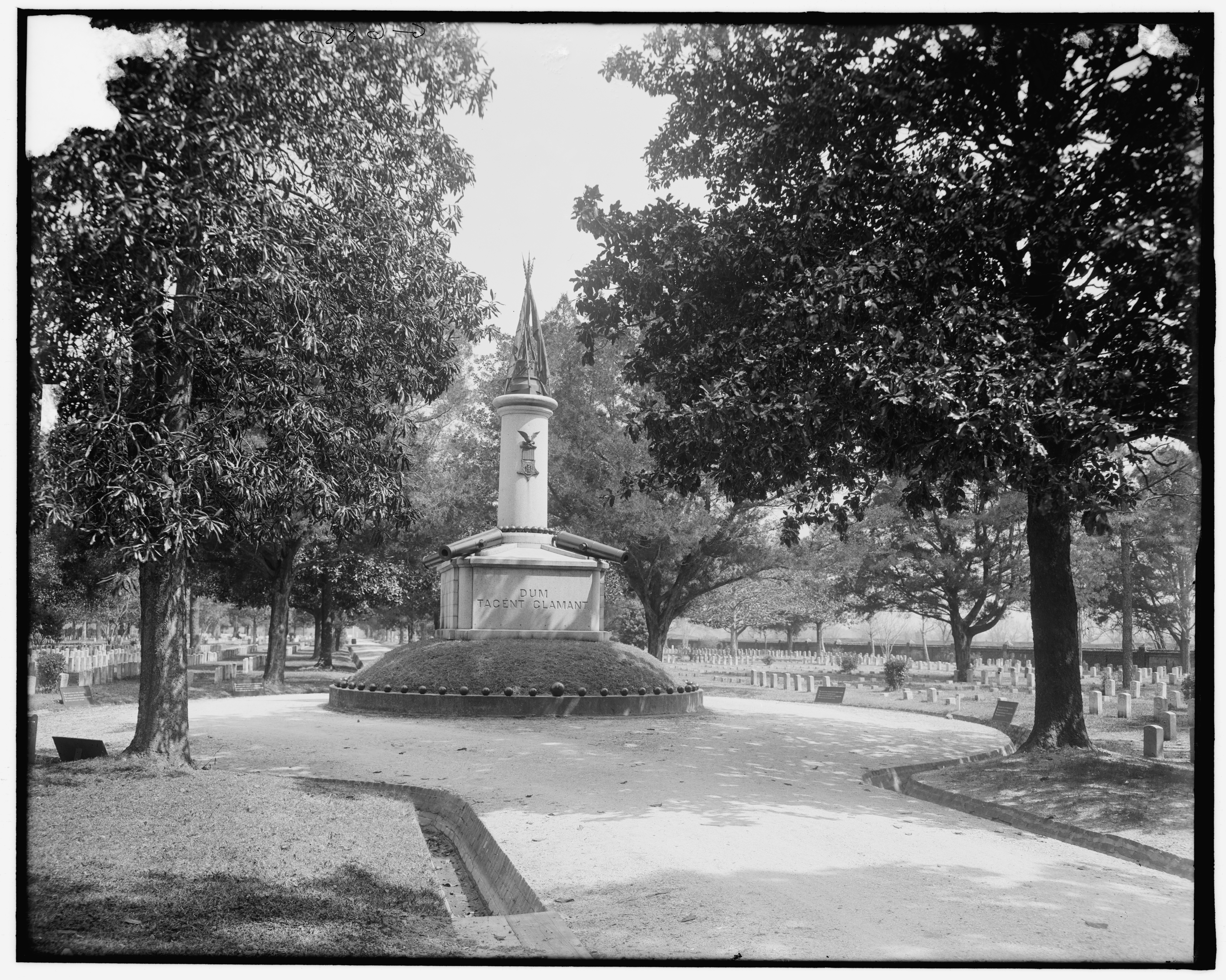
Grand Army of the Republic Memorial at Chalmette National Cemetery, as seen in 1910

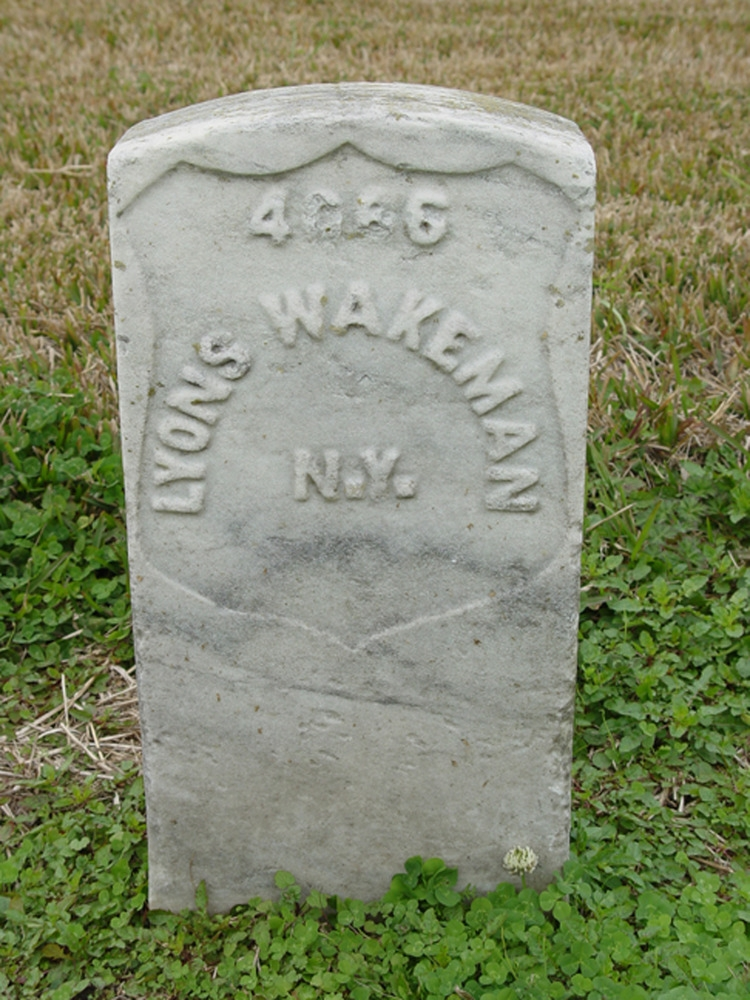
Pvt. Lyons Wakeman headstone in the Chalmette National Cemetery. Her real name was Sarah Rosetta Wakeman.

== See also ==
- United States Department of Veterans Affairs
- Chalmette Unit, Jean Lafitte National Historial Park and Preserve
- Historic Cemeteries of New Orleans
