= Freedmen's Cemetery (Louisiana) =

African-American cemetery in Louisiana

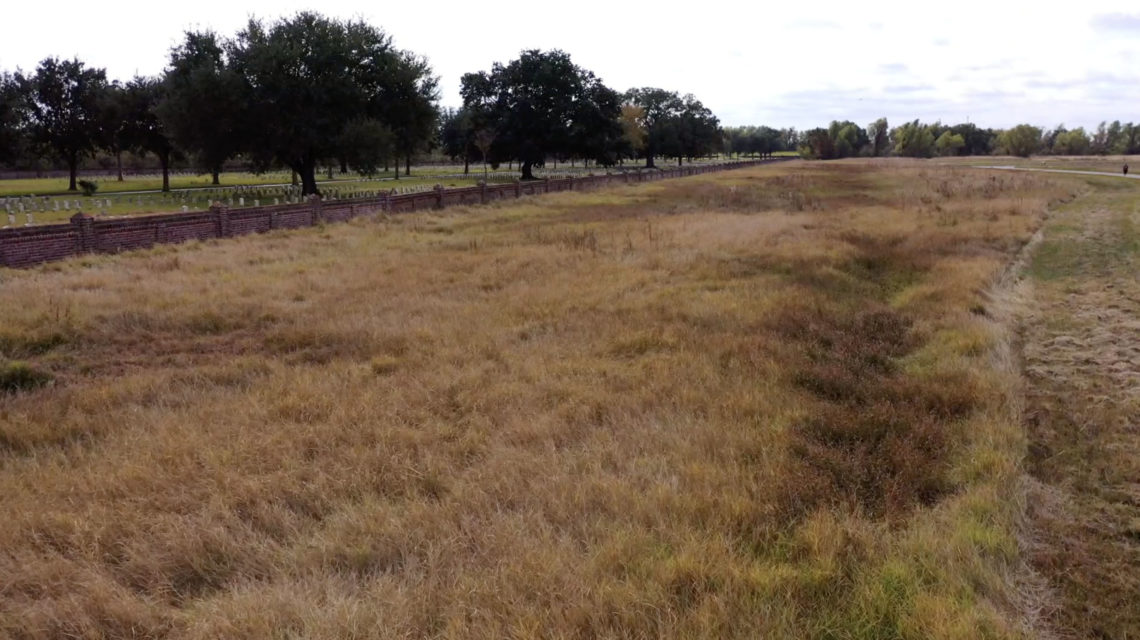
- Freedmen's Cemetery in 2019
- Interactive map of Freedmen's Cemetery

Details
- Established: 1867
- Location: Chalmette, Louisiana, formerly considered New Orleans, Louisiana
- Country: United States
- Coordinates: 29.9427°N 89.9879°W
- No. of graves: 2,000 to 4,000
- Find a Grave: Freedmen's Cemetery

The Freedmen's Cemetery was a cemetery in St. Bernard Parish, Louisiana, where formerly enslaved men, women and children were buried following the end of the American Civil War. Established in 1867 as a four-acre civilian cemetery by the U.S. Bureau of Refugees, Freedmen, and Abandoned Lands, also known as the Freedmen's Bureau, it was located near the historic African American community of Fazendeville, Louisiana and adjacent to Monument Cemetery (now known as the Chalmette National Cemetery), where the U.S. government had begun burying deceased Union soldiers in 1864, many of whom had been involved in the Red River campaign.

Adding new burials until May 1869, the cemetery quickly became overgrown after its management was abandoned by the Freedmen's Bureau when it ended its operations in Louisiana in 1872 and transferred its management authority over the cemetery to the city government in New Orleans, Louisiana.

This Freedmen's Cemetery site is considered to be one of the Historic Cemeteries of New Orleans, and has been memorialized by a historical marker, which is located near the entrance to Chalmette National Cemetery.

== History ==
The Freedmen's Bureau, officially known as the Bureau of Refugees, Freedmen, and Abandoned Lands, was created by an act of Congress on March 3, 1865 as a unit of the United States Department of War, and "was responsible for the supervision and management of all matters relating to the refugees and freedmen and lands abandoned or seized during the Civil War, duties previously shared by military commanders and US Treasury Department officials." Established to help people with the transition from enslavement to freedom, the bureau's various branch offices attempted to provide educational, housing and medical assistance to their clients, but faced many obstacles due to a "lack of funding, coupled with the politics of race and Reconstruction."

Chalmette National Cemetery, which had been established roughly a year earlier by the U.S. government to bury Union sailors and soldiers who had died from disease or battle wounds while stationed in Louisiana, was created from land that had initially been used during the war as "a refugee camp for freed slaves and later a burial ground for former slaves, black hospital patients, and both Union and Confederate troops," according to historians at the National Park Service. Within two years of the City of New Orleans' donation of this land to the federal government, however, civilian burials began outpacing the interments of federal soldiers. In response, federal officials obtained a four-acre parcel of land next to the national cemetery, ordered the exhumation of roughly two to four thousand civilians at Chalmette, and then orchestrated the reinterment of those civilian remains at the new site in 1867. That new site, which was located near the historic African American community of Fazendeville, Louisiana, was designated as the Freedmen's Cemetery.

New burials at the Freedmen's Cemetery came mainly from referrals by the Freedmen's Hospitals in Louisiana with approximately 716 interments made between 1867 and 1869. Well maintained at first, the cemetery's new graves were marked with wooden headboards; most of the names and causes of death for the deceased were also recorded in ledgers maintained by cemetery officials. Those original records are now maintained by the U.S. National Archives and Records Administration with digital copies available via various family history research websites.

Over time, Freedmen's Hospital branches were shuttered, including the Freedmen's Hospital in New Orleans, which closed its doors on January 1, 1869. As a result, new burials ceased at this Freedmen's Cemetery, effective May 1869.

By 1872, the entire Freedmen's Bureau was disabled. In 1873, a memo from the U.S. Army quartermaster general documented that the Freedmen's Cemetery initiative at Chalmette had been abandoned.

Deciding that the U.S. government had no desire to acquire or maintain the property adjacent to the national cemetery, federal officials ordered construction of a brick wall in 1874 to separate the cemeteries, and transferred ownership of the Freedmen's Cemetery land back to the City of New Orleans, which then sold the land in 1875 to Louisiana's Agricultural & Mechanical College. The chairman of the board of the college made attempts to have the national cemetery take over the cemetery as he saw evidence of U.S. Colored troops buried there and could still see some markers, but no movement was made by the federal government.

Over the years, the nearby Mississippi River flooded and frequently spilled over the knee-high levee, gradually depositing more and more dirt on top of the existing soil of the cemetery grounds, further obscuring evidence of the burials that had been made there. Today, the cemetery is situated within the Chalmette Battlefield, which is part of the Jean Lafitte National Historical Park and Preserve. There have been ground penetrating radar studies done to try to find evidence of individual graves, but the results were deemed inconclusive due to the burial depths of the bodies.

== Interments ==
More than eighty men, women, and children who died at the Freedmen's Bureau Hospital in New Orleans between May and July 1867 were interred at the Freedmen's Cemetery. Their names, causes and dates of death, and burial plot numbers were documented in Freedmen's Bureau records, which are available at the National Archives. Causes of death included: age-related debility, anasarca, apoplexy, brain inflammation, cholera, dropsy, dysentery, edema, epilepsy, gangrene, hepatitis, lung inflammation, paralysis, phthisis, pleurisy, pneumonia, rheumatic fever, rheumatism, scrofula, smallpox, and tetanus.

Additionally, Freedmen's Cemetery interments were reported in death notices and other news coverage of New Orleans area newspapers, including that of Eliza Blondeau. Also known as Mary Johnson, Blondeau was a November 1867 homicide victim of Jefferson Lewis, whose 1868 trial was covered by the New Orleans Republican.

== See also ==
- List of cemeteries in Louisiana
