= Jean Lafitte National Historical Park and Preserve =

Protected area in Southern Louisiana, US

- Parc historique national et réserve Jean Lafitte (French)
- IUCN category V (protected landscape/seascape)
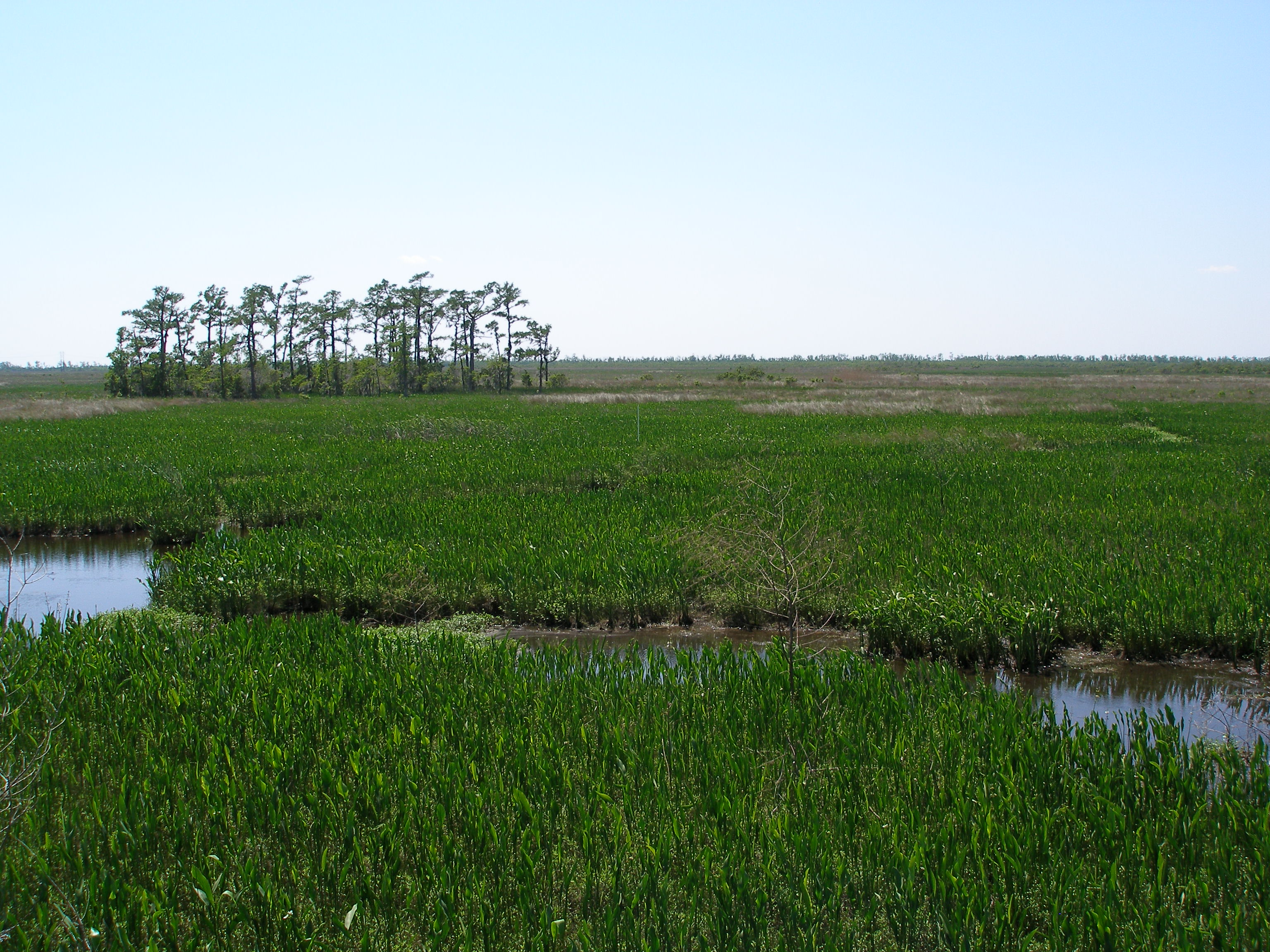
- Barataria Preserve

- Location within Louisiana Location within the United States
- Location: South Louisiana
- Nearest city: New Orleans and Lafayette, Louisiana
- Coordinates: 29°56′33″N 89°59′39″W
- Area: 25,876 acres (104.72 km^{2}); 21,081 acres (8,531 ha) federal
- Established: March 4, 1907
- Visitors: 226,543 (in 2025)
- Governing body: National Park Service
- Website: Jean Lafitte National Historical Park and Preserve

Jean Lafitte National Historical Park and Preserve (French: Parc historique national et réserve Jean Lafitte) protects the natural and cultural resources of Louisiana's Mississippi River Delta region. It is named after French pirate Jean Lafitte and consists of six separate sites and a park headquarters.

== Acadiana ==
Three sites interpret the Cajun culture of the Lafayette (southern Louisiana) area, which developed after Acadians were resettled in the region following their expulsion from Canada (1755–1764) by the British, and the transfer of French Louisiana to Spain in the aftermath of the French and Indian War.

- Acadian Cultural Center in Lafayette
- Prairie Acadian Cultural Center in Eunice, obtained through the work of Mayor Curtis Joubert
- Wetlands Acadian Cultural Center in Thibodaux

== Nature preserve ==
- Barataria Unit of Jean Lafitte Historical Park Historic District
- U.S. National Register of Historic Places
- U.S. Historic district
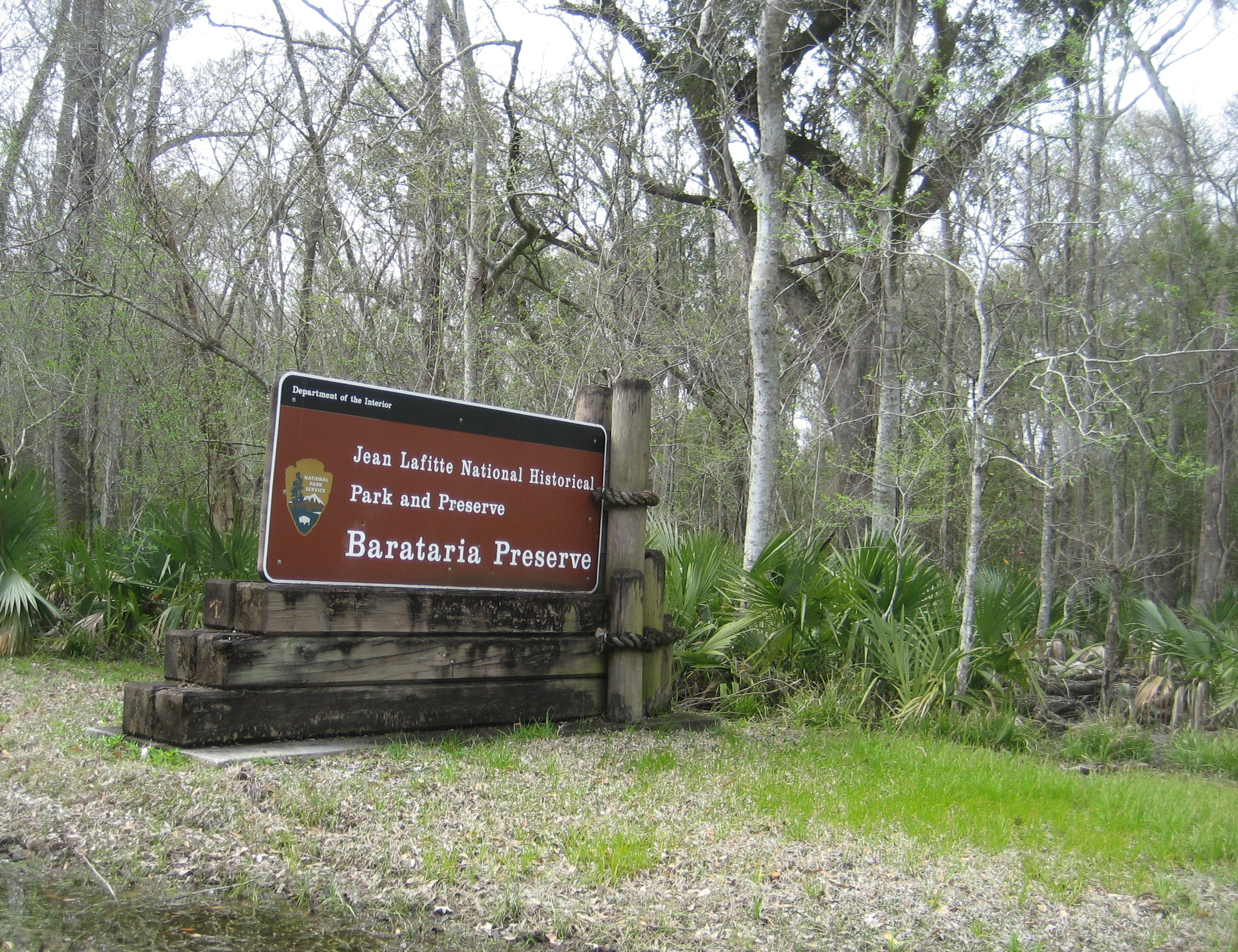
- Coordinates: 29°47′56″N 90°07′24″W
- Area: 1,855 acres (751 ha)
- NRHP reference No.: 66000966
- Added to NRHP: October 15, 1966

The Barataria Preserve in Marrero interprets the natural and cultural history of the region. The preserve has trails and canoe tours through bottomland hardwood forests, swamps, and marsh. An Education Center provides curriculum-based programming for school groups and a visitor center with a film and exhibits. The 1,855 acres (751 ha) Barataria area comprises 63 contributing properties and was added as a historic district on October 15, 1966.

== Chalmette unit ==
The Chalmette Battlefield and National Cemetery is located in Chalmette, Louisiana, six miles (10 km) southeast of New Orleans, on the site where the 1815 Battle of New Orleans took place. It is "an integral part of both the history of New Orleans and of the nation", according to National Park Service historians because the cemetery is one of the oldest in the United States.

Established in May 1864, the national cemetery holds the remains of American Civil War casualties and veterans, as well as the remains of soldiers from the Indian Wars of the late 19th century, the Spanish–American War, the First and Second World Wars, the Korean War, and the Vietnam War. Among the Civil War dead interred at Chalmette are members of the 47th Pennsylvania Infantry Regiment, the only regiment from Pennsylvania involved in the 1864 Red River campaign, and the 12th Maine Infantry Regiment. There are also a few earlier graves from the 1815 Battle of New Orleans.

During the 1930s, various improvements were made to the Jean Lafitte National Historical Park and Preserve, "including paving the entrance drive linking to St. Bernard Highway, paving the circle around the monument, and installation of two visitor parking areas". In addition, employees of the Works Progress Administration (WPA) realigned multiple headstones at the national cemetery in 1937.

During the early 1960s, the historic community of Fazendeville was demolished in order to expand the battlefield in preparation for the commemoration of the 150th anniversary of the Battle of New Orleans, which took place in 1965. The town, which had been established sometime around 1870 by Jean-Pierre Fazende, had been "founded as a home for newly freed slaves", according to news reports. Local, state and federal elected officials had been engaged in efforts to acquire the community's lands since at least the early 1930s.

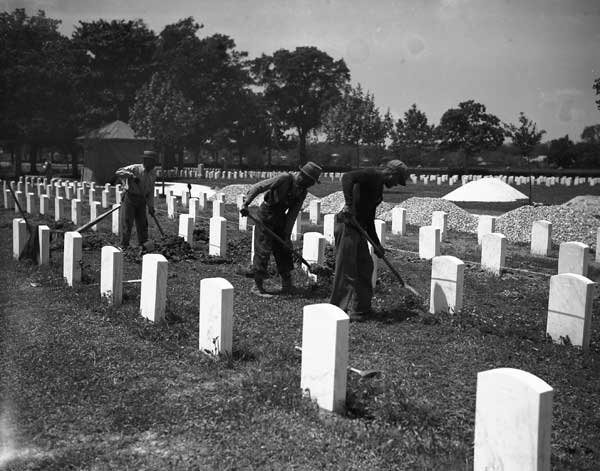
WPA workers straighten headstones, Chalmette National Cemetery, 1937

Another major restoration took place from March 7 to April 1, 2016 when volunteers from HOPE Crew (Hands-on Preservation Experience) participated, in partnership with the National Trust for Historic Preservation, the National Park Service and the National Center of Preservation Technology and Training, in the cleaning and re-setting of 671 headstones in the oldest part of the national cemetery, which is "the final resting place for US Colored Troops, servicemen who consisted of 'free men of color' formerly known as the Louisiana Native Guard; free, mixed-race 'creoles' who the Confederacy barred from joining their forces, and refugees, or 'contraband' from nearby plantations who served the Union Army in exchange for food, clothing and housing for their families", according to a spokesperson for the trust. The headstones that were restored had been misaligned or damaged by air pollution and mold growth, and were cleaned with products donated by D/2 Biological Solution, Inc. Restoration experts from Pierre Masonry, Texas Cemetery Restoration, Oak and Laurel Cemetery Preservation and Monument Conservation Collaborative were recruited to oversee the volunteers' work.

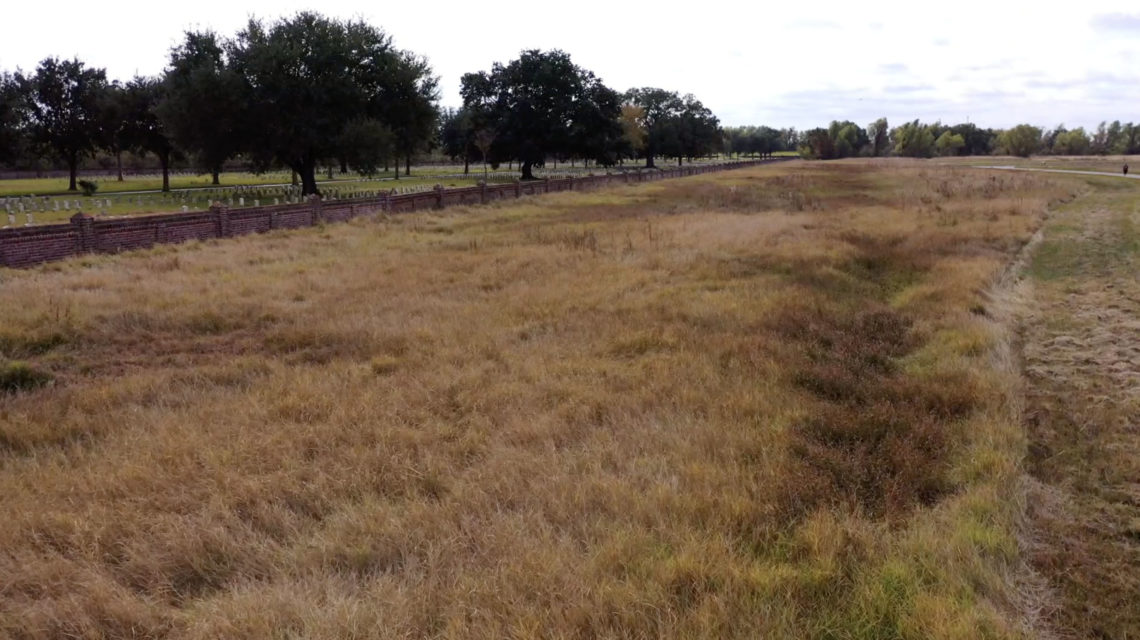
Site of the former Freedmen's Cemetery in 2019, separated by a brick wall from the Chalmette National Cemetery (upper left)

Located adjacent to the Chalmette National Cemetery, and within the boundaries of the Jean Lafitte National Historical Park and Preserve, is the site of the defunct Freedmen's Cemetery, a four-acre African American burial ground that had been established by the federal government in 1867 to inter the remains of formerly enslaved men, women and children who had been receiving assistance from the U.S. Bureau of Refugees, Freedmen, and Abandoned Lands (also known as the Freedmen's Bureau) in making the transition from slavery to freedom after the Civil War. Initially well maintained, the cemetery fell into disrepair during the 1870s as various Freedmen's Bureau services were curtailed and then eliminated due to budget cuts and "the politics of race and Reconstruction". U.S. Quartermaster's Office records document the debates by federal government officials regarding the creation and management of this cemetery, as well as their decision to ultimately abandon the Freedmen's Cemetery. The site is now memorialized by a historical marker located near the entrance to Chalmette National Cemetery.

=== Chalmette Monuments and Visitors' Center ===
In 1840, a cornerstone was laid for a proposed monument commemorating the American victory in the Battle of New Orleans, but completion of that monument's construction was delayed due to budget issues. Frustrated by the federal government's lack of progress, members of the Louisiana Society of the United States Daughters of 1776 and 1812 began lobbying elected officials for help during the 1890s, finally securing the support necessary from the administration of President Theodore Roosevelt for the monument's erection. Known as the Chalmette Monument, the one-hundred-foot-tall obelisk was completed in 1908. Closed for repairs after parts of the Jean Lafitte National Historical Park and Preserve were damaged or destroyed by Hurricane Katrina in 2005, it was reopened to the public during a rededication ceremony on National Public Lands Day on September 28, 2013. The monument features an observation deck which offers visitors views of the battlefield and City of New Orleans.

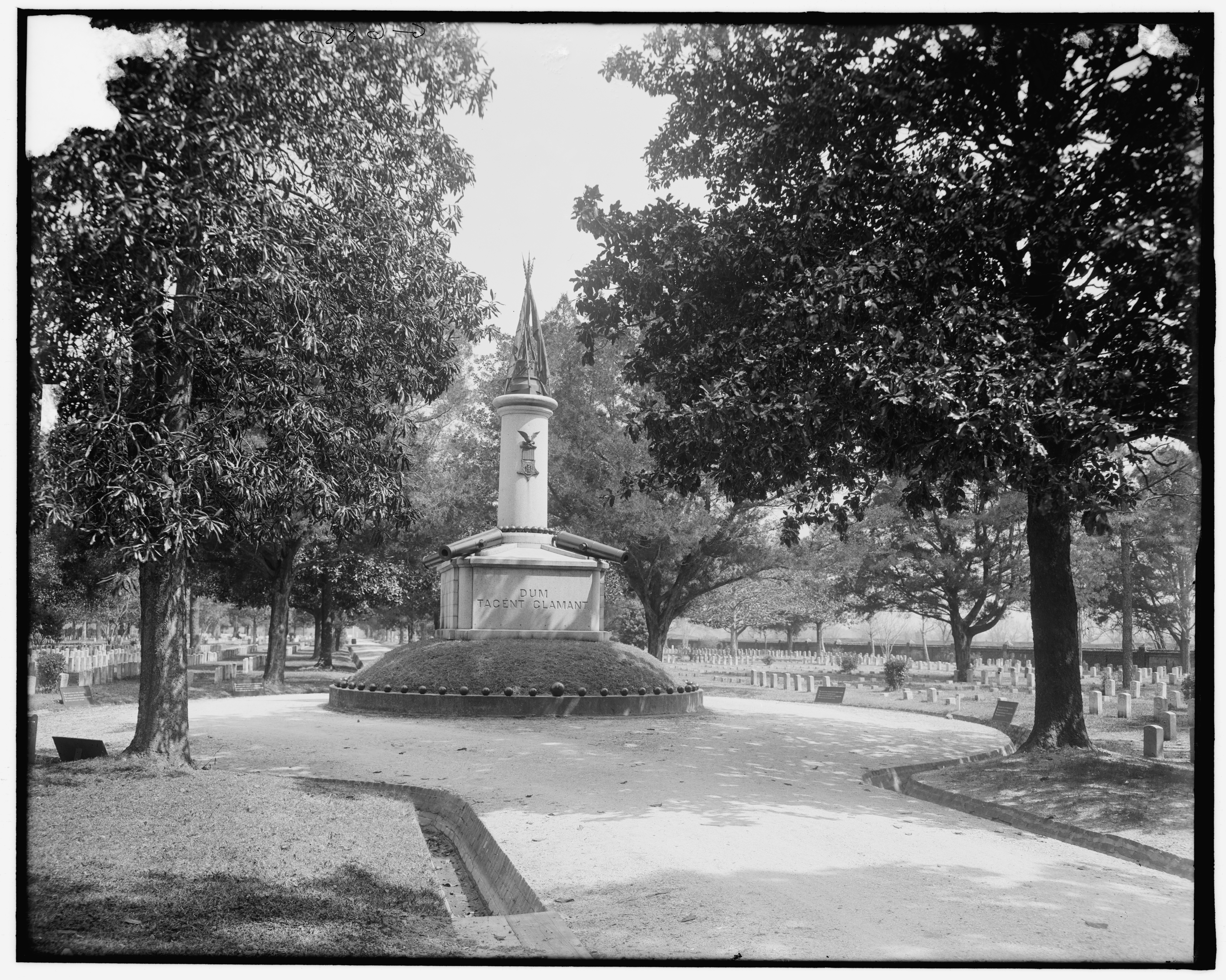
Grand Army of the Republic Monument, Chalmette National Cemetery, 1910

In February 1874, members of the Grand Army of the Republic's Joseph Mower Post in New Orleans secured permission to erect a G.A.R. monument on the grounds of the national cemetery to pay tribute to deceased Union Army soldiers. Although implementation of this project was also delayed due to funding problems, construction was able to be finished more quickly than it was for the proposed obelisk. Completed in 1882, the G.A.R. monument was inscribed with the Latin phrase, "Dum Tacent Clamant" ("While They Are Silent, They Cry Aloud"), and has served as "a focal point" for Memorial Day ceremonies since that time.

The present-day visitors' center located near the battleground obelisk offers information and exhibits. Rebuilt after it was destroyed in 2005 by Hurricane Katrina, this new center reopened in 2010.

Special events held at the Chalmette National Battlefield and Cemetery each year include commemoration ceremonies related to the Battle of New Orleans and Memorial Day, living history demonstrations, and wreath-laying ceremonies.

== New Orleans unit ==
The park operates a French Quarter Visitor Center at 419 Decatur Street (New Orleans), in the historic French Quarter. It interprets more generally the history of New Orleans and the diverse cultures of Louisiana's Mississippi River Delta region.

The headquarters of Jean Lafitte National Historical Park and Preserve are located in New Orleans.

== Administrative history ==
The origins of the park trace to efforts to commemorate the Battle of New Orleans (January 8, 1815). The State of Louisiana began construction of the Chalmette Monument in 1855, but work stalled during the American Civil War and was not completed until 1908 with federal funds. On March 4, 1907, Congress formally established the Chalmette Monument and Grounds as a federal commemorative site under the War Department.

Under Executive Order 6166, historic sites managed by the War Department were transferred to the National Park Service on August 10, 1933, including Chalmette Battlefield and the adjacent Chalmette National Cemetery. Congress redesignated the property as Chalmette National Historical Park on August 10, 1939 (53 Stat. 1342), expanding its boundaries and authorizing additional land acquisition.

Both the Chalmette site and the Barataria Marsh Unit were listed on the National Register of Historic Places on October 15, 1966, following passage of the National Historic Preservation Act. The Chalmette district encompasses approximately 143 acres, including the battlefield, Malus-Beauregard House, and interpretive features, while the Barataria district includes 63 contributing properties within 1,855 acres of wetland landscape.

Congress authorized the creation of a multi-site park in the National Parks and Recreation Act of 1978 (Pub. L. 95–625, Title IX), establishing Jean Lafitte National Historical Park and Preserve to protect significant natural and cultural resources of the Mississippi River Delta region. The enabling legislation incorporated Chalmette National Historical Park, the Barataria Marsh Unit, and interpretive facilities in the French Quarter, and provided for future Cajun and Acadian cultural centers. In 1988, Congress amended the law to formally add the Acadiana unit, creating the six-site configuration managed today.

Subsequent legislation authorized boundary adjustments and cooperative agreements for cultural resource interpretation, including the 1996 designation of the Laura C. Hudson Visitor Center in New Orleans and multiple expansions of the Barataria Preserve to protect additional wetlands.

== See also ==
- Freedmen's Cemetery
- Historic Cemeteries of New Orleans
- National Register of Historic Places listings in Jefferson Parish, Louisiana
- New Orleans Jazz National Historical Park

== Gallery ==
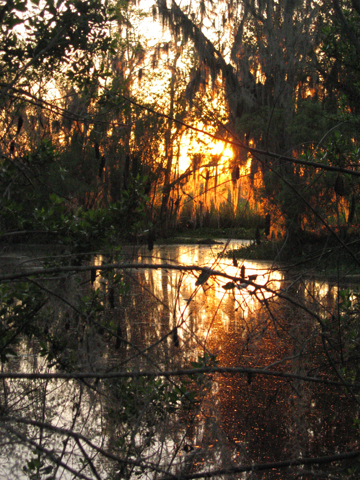
Sunset in Barataria Preserve, Louisiana

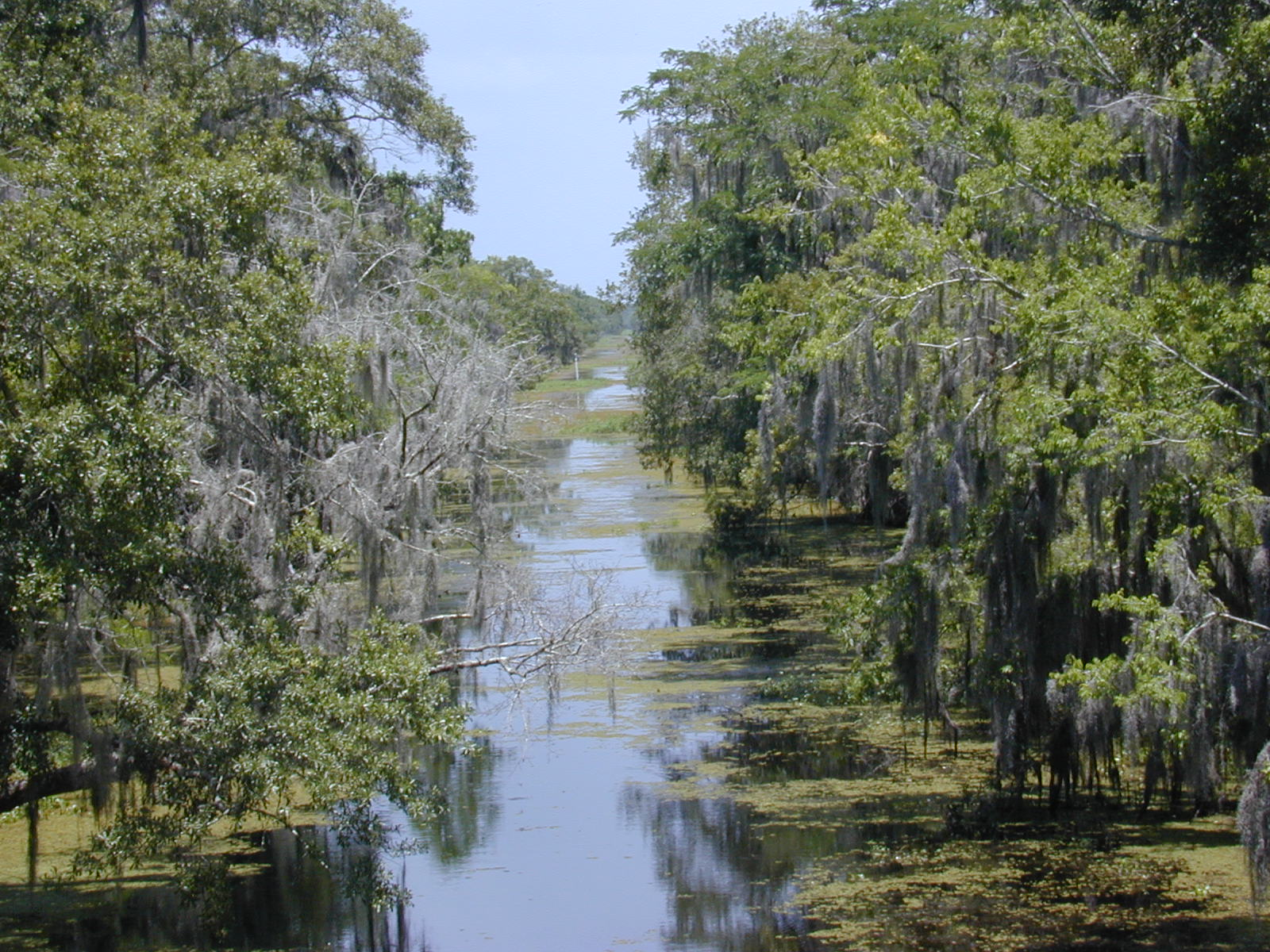
Kenta Canal at Barataria Preserve, Louisiana

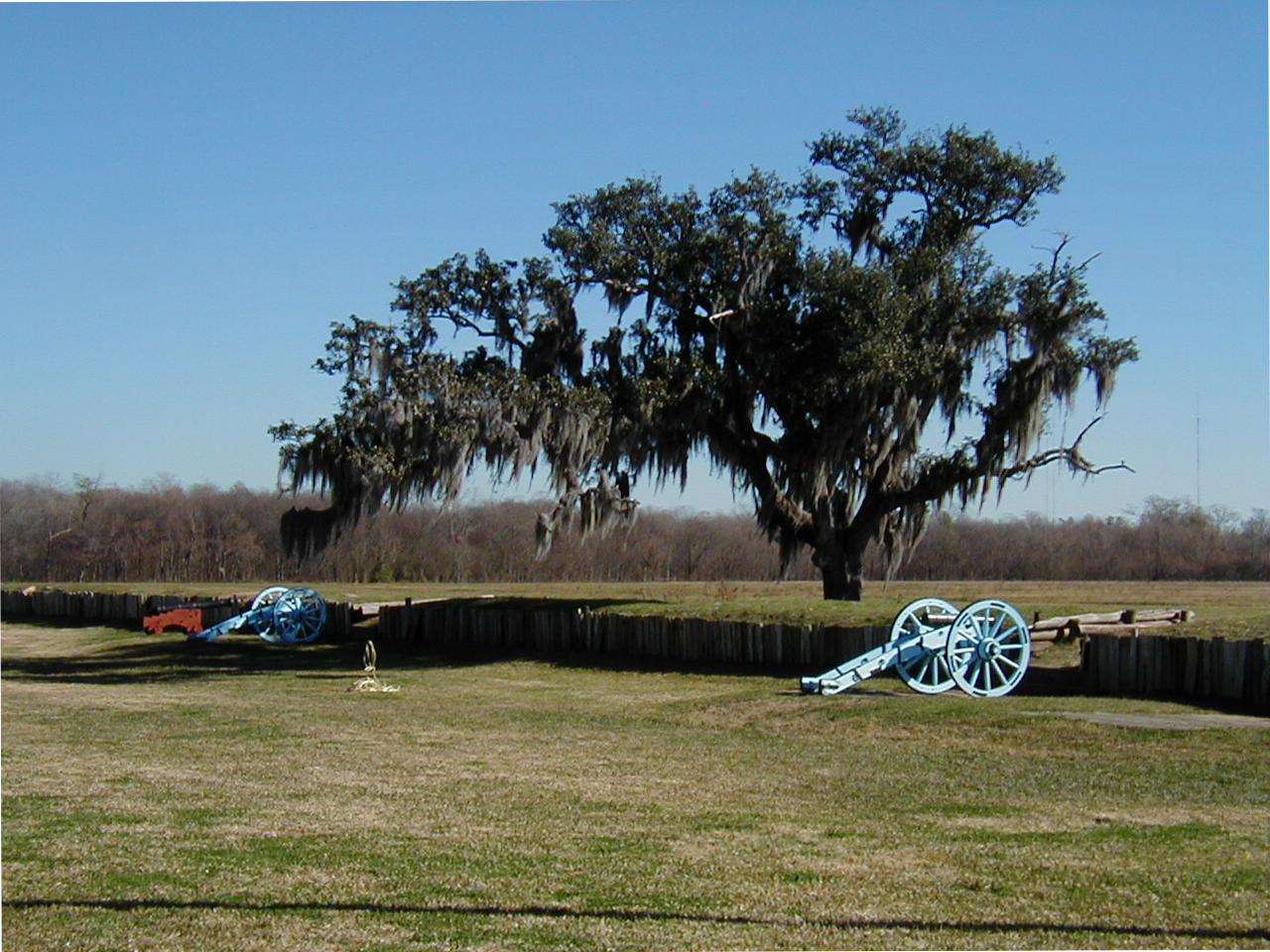
Line Jackson

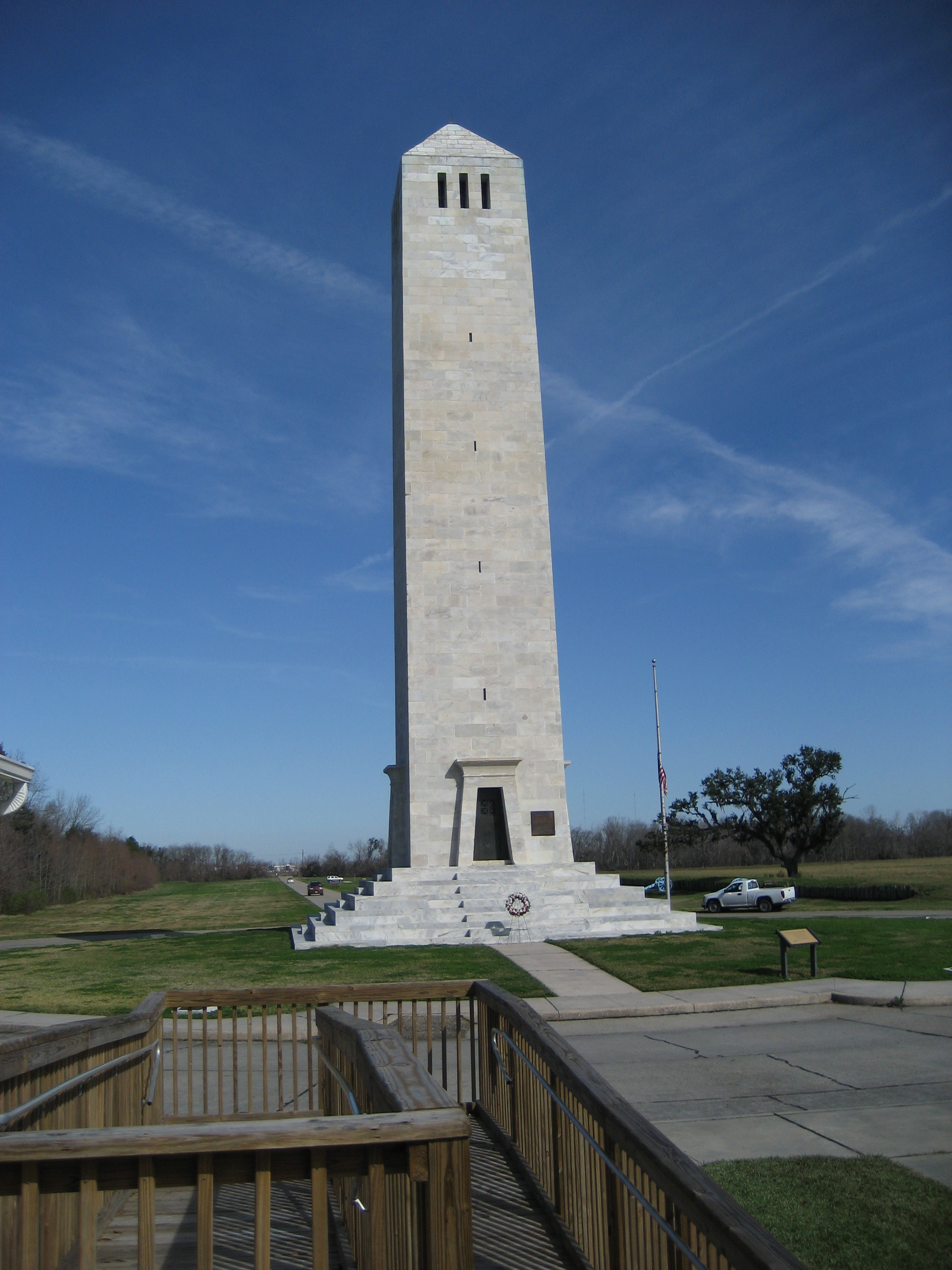
Chalmette Monument
