= 153rd New York Infantry Regiment =

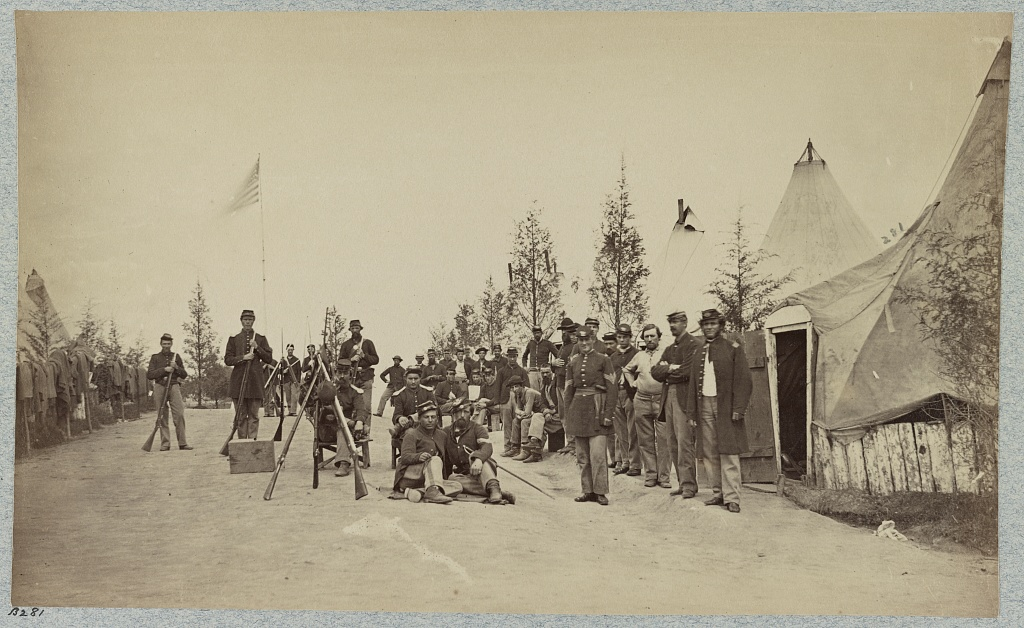
- Active: August 23, 1862 - October 2, 1865
- Country: United States
- Allegiance: Union
- Branch: Infantry
- Engagements: Red River Campaign; Battle of Sabine Cross Roads; Battle of Fort Stevens; Third Battle of Winchester; Battle of Fisher's Hill; Battle of Cedar Creek

The 153rd New York Infantry Regiment was an infantry regiment in the Union Army during the American Civil War.

== Service ==
The 153rd New York Infantry was organized at Fonda, New York beginning August 23, 1862 and mustered in for three-years service on October 17, 1862, under the command of Colonel Duncan McMartin.

The regiment was attached to Provisional Brigade, Abercrombie's Division, Defenses of Washington, to October 1862. District of Alexandria, Defenses of Washington and XXII Corps, Department of Washington, to August 1863. Martindale's Command, Garrison of Washington, D.C., XXII Corps, to February 1864. 1st Brigade, 1st Division, XIX Corps, Department of the Gulf, to July 1864, and Army of the Shenandoah, Middle Military Division, to February 1865. 2nd Brigade, 1st Provisional Division, Army of the Shenandoah, to April 1865. 2nd Brigade, Dwight's Division, Department of Washington, to July 1865. Department of Georgia to October 1865.

The 153rd New York Infantry mustered out of service October 2, 1865 in Savannah, Georgia.

== Detailed service ==
Left New York for Washington, D.C., October 18, 1862. Guard and police duty at Alexandria, Va., and at Washington, D.C., until February 1864. Ordered to the Department of the Gulf February 1864. Red River Campaign March 10-May 22. Advance from Franklin to Alexandria March 14–26. Battle of Sabine Cross Roads April 8. Pleasant Hill April 9. Monett's Ferry, Cane River Crossing, April 23. At Alexandria April 26-May 13. Retreat to Morganza May 13–20. Mansura May 16. Avoyelle's Prairie May 16. Duty at Morganza until July 1. Moved to Fort Monroe, Va., then to Washington, D.C., July 1–12. Repulse of Early's attack on Washington July 12–13. Snicker's Gap Expedition July 14–23. Sheridan's Shenandoah Valley Campaign August 7-November 28. Battle of Winchester September 19. Fisher's Hill September 22. Battle of Cedar Creek October 19. Duty at Middletown, Newtown, and Stephenson's Depot until April 5, 1865. Moved to Washington, D.C., April 5, and duty there until July. Grand Review of the Armies May 23–24. Ordered to Savannah, Ga., July, and duty in the Department of Georgia until October.

== Casualties ==
The regiment lost a total of 200 men during service; 1 officer and 38 enlisted men killed or mortally wounded, 1 officer and 160 enlisted men died of disease.

== Commanders ==
- Colonel Duncan McMartin
- Colonel Edwin Page Davis

== See also ==
- List of New York Civil War regiments
- New York in the Civil War
