= Louisiana Endowment for the Humanities =

Nonprofit organization in New Orleans, United States

- Headquarters: Louisiana Humanities Center at Turners' Hall
- Location(s): 938 Lafayette Street; Suite 300; New Orleans, Louisiana
- President: Miranda Restovic
- Board Chairman: Willie Landry Mount
- Affiliations: National Endowment for the Humanities
- Budget: $10,196,309 (Fiscal Year 2020)
- Website: http://www.leh.org/

The Louisiana Endowment for the Humanities is a nonprofit organization dedicated to furthering the education of residents of the state of Louisiana. In its mission, the Louisiana Endowment for the Humanities pledges to provide access to and promote an appreciation of the history of Louisiana and its literary and cultural history. It was founded in 1972 as a result of initial funding by the National Endowment for the Humanities.

== Founding and history ==
Beginning in 1971, the National Endowment for the Humanities initiated an experimental adult education program consisting of grants to the states to promote state-based programs of informal adult education in the humanities. The Louisiana Endowment for the Humanities came into existence in 1972, as the 17th program of its kind in the United States. It is one of more than fifty state humanities councils established to give individual states and territories greater autonomy in the humanities.

The Louisiana Endowment for the Humanities has been headquartered at Turners' Hall in the Central Business District of New Orleans since 2007. This historic building was built in 1868 by the Society of Turners as a social club for German-American citizens.

== Programs and publications ==
During the period 2008 to 2012, the Louisiana Endowment for the Humanities, in partnership with the National Endowment for the Humanities, funded $6.4 million of projects to preserve the cultural heritage of Louisiana. The organization funds programs including discussions, documentaries, digital media, exhibition development, festivals pertinent to Louisiana's cultural heritage, publications, and scholar-in-residence programs.

The Louisiana Endowment for the Humanities administers annual Louisiana Humanities awards, including the Louisiana Humanist of the Year Award, Champion of Culture Award, Humanities Book Award, Humanities Documentary Film Award, and the Light Up for Literacy Award. Recent Humanists of the year have included musician Terence Blanchard, poet Darrell Bourque, chef and civil rights activist Leah Chase, artist William Joyce, and musician Zachary Richard.

In 2021, the Louisiana Endowment honored Louisiana State University professor Joyce Marie Jackson with its Lifetime Contributions to the Humanities award for her enhancement of the understanding of African American culture and music, sacred and secular rituals in Africa and the diaspora.

The Louisiana Endowment for the Humanities publishes 64 Parishes (formerly Louisiana Cultural Vistas), a quarterly magazine. 64 Parishes is also the name of a state encyclopedia, formerly Know Louisiana.

== Impact ==
The Louisiana Endowment for the Humanities documents its impact in its publicly available annual report. As part of the Chronicling America program, during the period 2008 – 2012, it digitized approximately 100,000 pages of historic newspapers with publication years between 1860 and 1922, including the Natchitoches Times and the Feliciana Sentinel. In 1991, the Louisiana Endowment for the Humanities established the Prime Time Family Reading Program, which has provided literacy support to over 40,000 at-risk children and parents, using several grants provided by the National Endowment for the Humanities. The LEH has also periodically funded the public radio program American Routes. The Louisiana Endowment for the Humanities produces and disseminates Louisiana-related humanities content through 64 Parishes, a quarterly print magazine and website that is the successor to the KnowLA digital encyclopedia for Louisiana and Louisiana Cultural Vistas magazine.

== Gallery ==
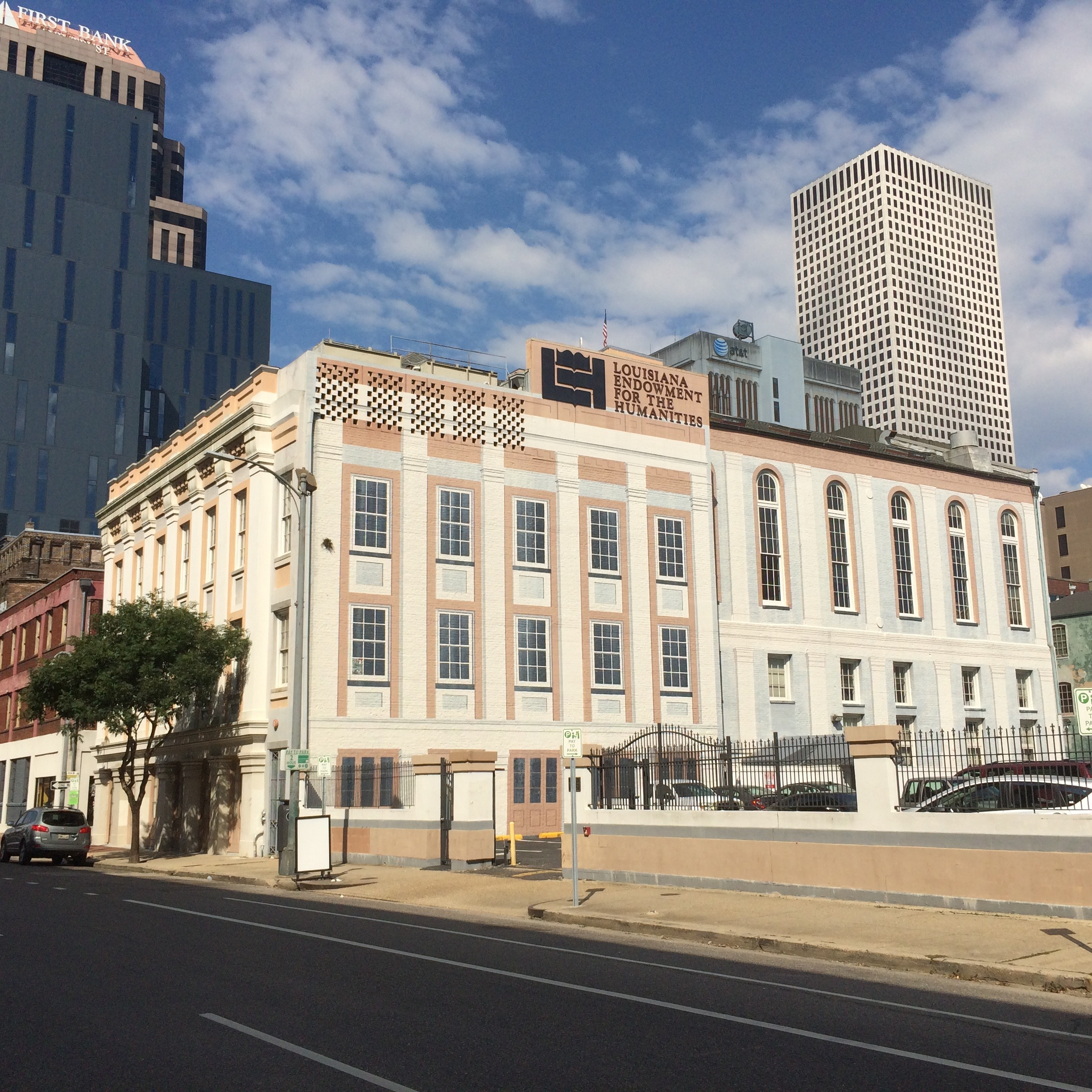
Louisiana Endowment for the Humanities at Turners Hall

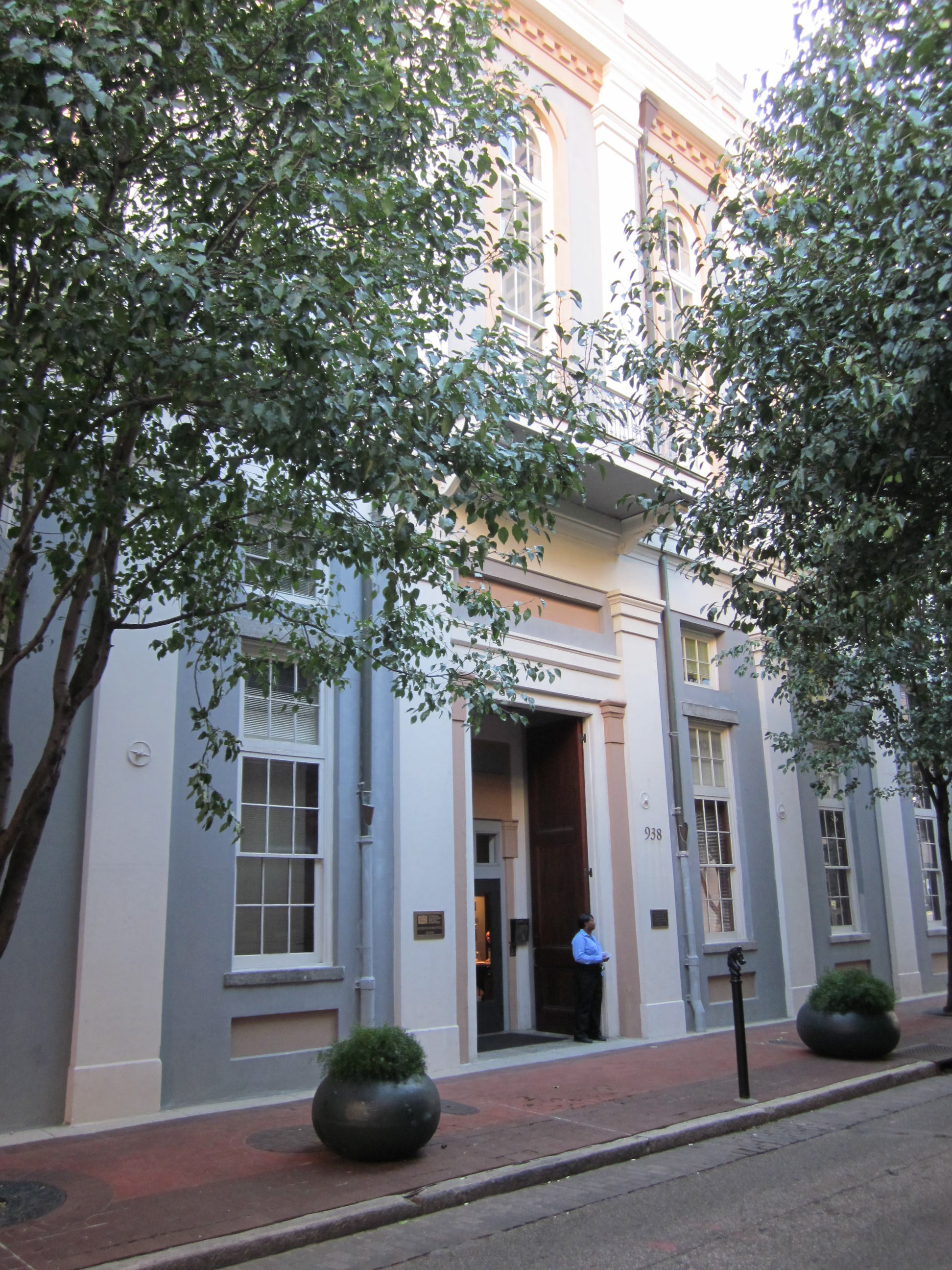
Entrance to Turners Hall on Lafayette Street
