= Historic Cemeteries of New Orleans =

Historically significant cemeteries

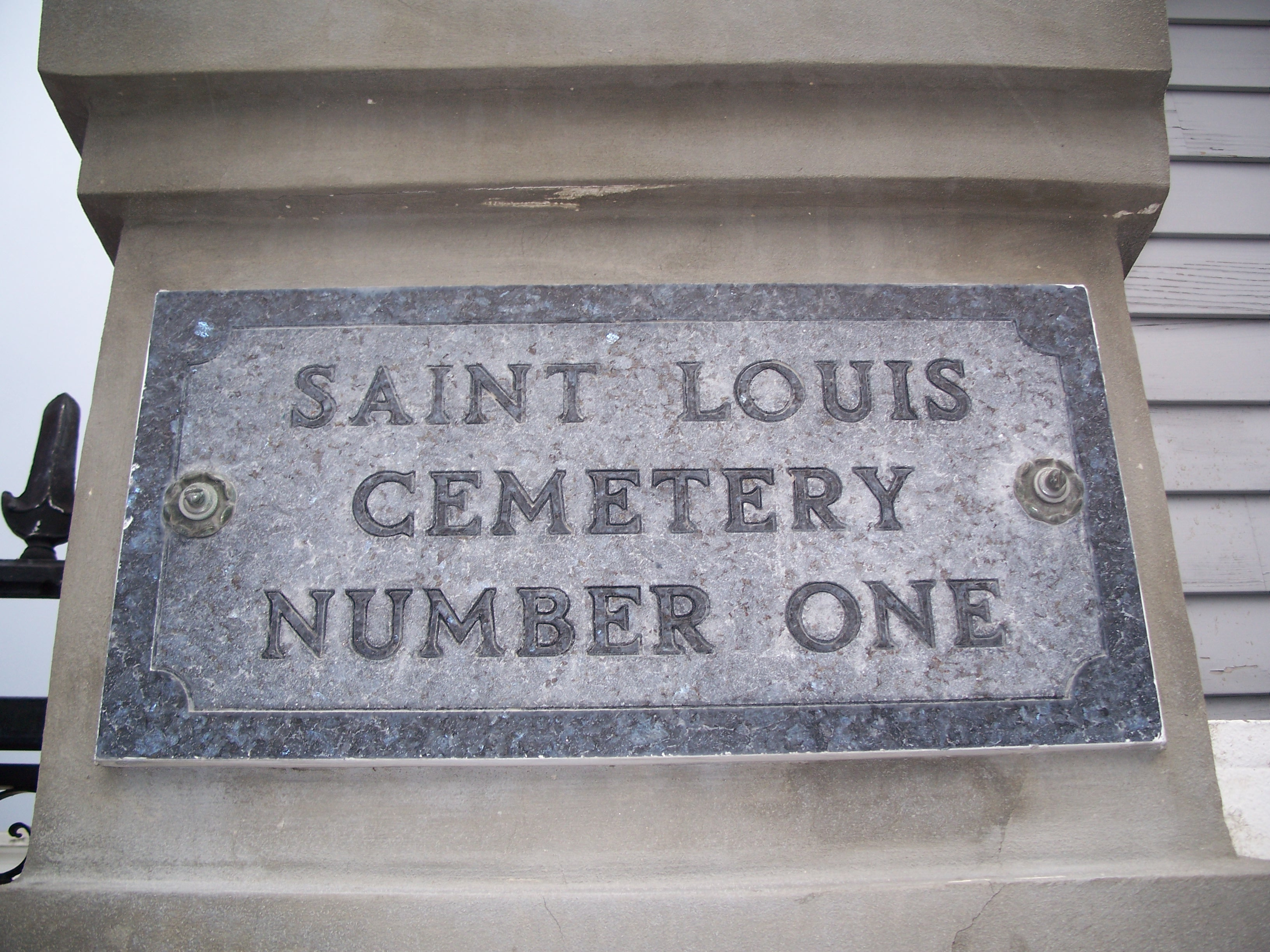
Plaque at St Louis Cemetery No. 1, the oldest still existing (extant) cemetery in New Orleans

The Historic Cemeteries of New Orleans, New Orleans, United States, are a group of forty-two cemeteries that are historically and culturally significant. These are distinct from most cemeteries commonly located in the United States in that they are an amalgam of the French, Spanish, and Caribbean historical influences on the city of New Orleans in addition to limitations resulting from the city's high water table. The cemeteries reflect the ethnic, religious, and socio-economic heritages of the city. Architecturally, they are predominantly above ground tombs, family tombs, civic association tombs, and wall vaults, often in neo-classical design and laid out in regular patterns similar to city streets. They are at times referred to colloquially as “Cities of the Dead”, and some of the historic cemeteries are tourist destinations. (Note: Architectural historian Peter B. Dedek uses the term Historic Cemeteries of New Orleans.)

Assessment of a cemetery as historic is subjective to a degree, and so there may be somewhat more or less than forty-two historic cemeteries in New Orleans. Historians have made such assessments about the cemeteries in New Orleans.

New Orleans is at or below sea level, resulting in a high water table in the soil. If a body or coffin is placed in an in-ground tomb in New Orleans, there is risk of it being water-logged or even displaced from the ground. For this reason, the people of New Orleans have generally used above-ground tombs. Over the years as designs have evolved, these tombs have become architecturally, culturally, and historically distinct.

== Early history ==
After New Orleans was established in 1718 by French colonial powers, the early settlement was an inhospitable outpost, afflicted by disease, tropical storms, and poor sanitation. The resulting high mortality rate combined with the population growth of the colony necessitated that means of burial needed to be established early in the history of New Orleans.

The first known public cemetery appears on 1725 maps of New Orleans at a block in the area today known as the French Quarter. This cemetery was the St. Peter Street Cemetery (French: Cimetière St-Pierre). Burials there were mostly in-ground, and this was an economic necessity for the city at the time. It was fenced in by 1743 and ultimately closed by 1800. In the same time period, corpses were also buried in the natural levee along the Mississippi River and other locations in and around the area today known as Jackson Square. Wealthy people were buried in the St. Louis Church.

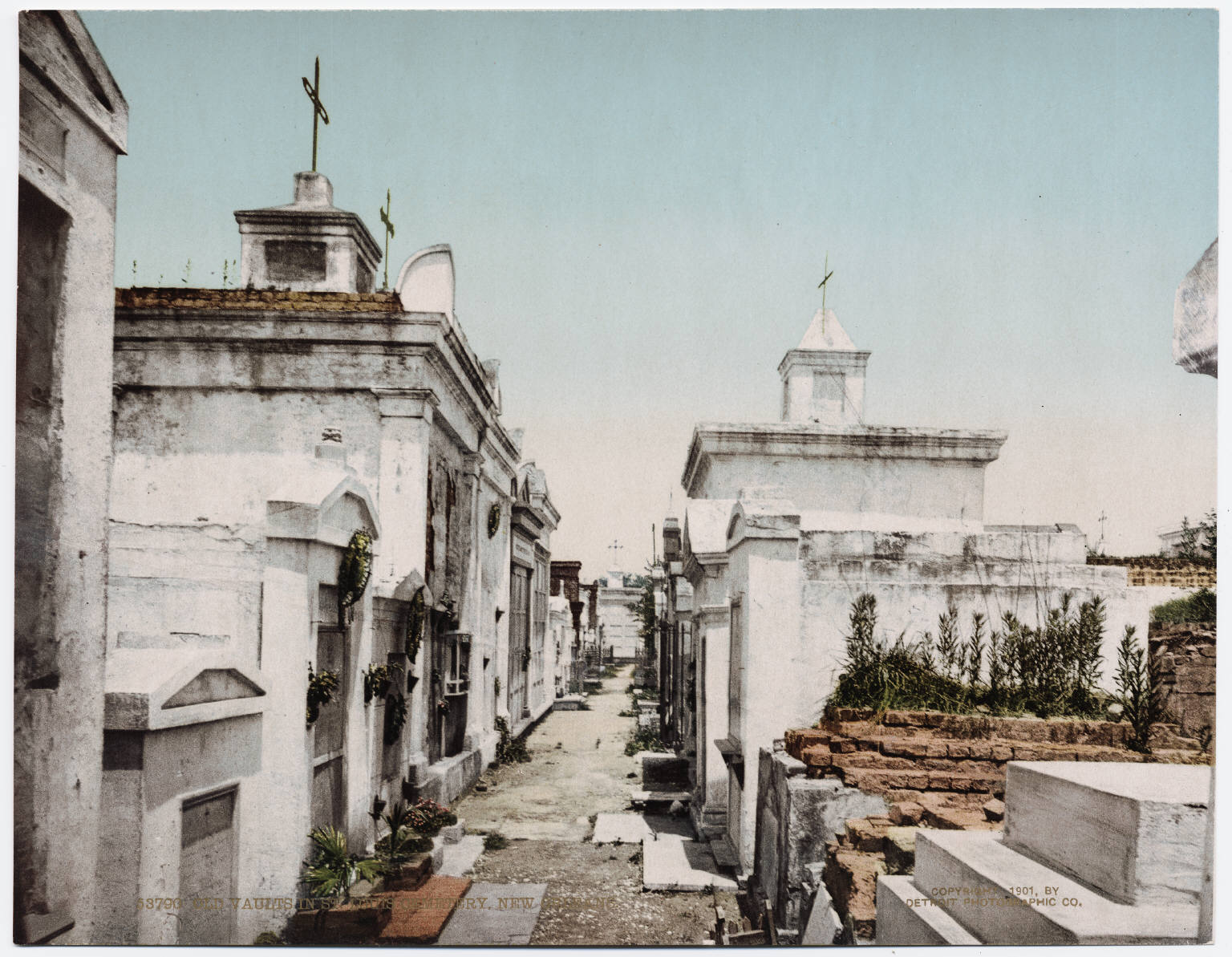
View of St. Louis Cemetery No. 1 showing the street-like layout of the tombs

In 1788, a yellow fever epidemic struck New Orleans. This epidemic, in addition to the proximity of the St. Peter Street Cemetery and the high water table for in-ground burials, created a sanitation problem for disposing of the dead. In response, city officials created the St. Louis Cemetery (later known as St. Louis Cemetery Number 1), which had a suburban location at the time, being outside of the city's fortifications. The decision to locate in a suburban area followed the common practice of other municipalities in tropical regions of the world. In-ground burials continued in the early years of the new cemetery, even though it was lower and wetter than the cemetery it was replacing. This cemetery was initially only for Roman Catholics, although Protestant burials were allowed adjacent to the Roman Catholic cemetery beginning in 1804.

The first above-ground tombs at St. Louis Cemetery were erected by 1804 and were common by 1818. The movement toward above-ground tombs was hastened by the elevation of the St. Louis Church to cathedral status in 1794. As a consequence, burial of members of the clergy or other privileged people of the community could no longer take place within the church, and so they and their families sought the prestige of an above-ground tomb at St. Louis Cemetery. Additionally, New Orleans experienced greater economic prosperity by the early 19th century. For these reasons, tombs at St. Louis Cemetery came to be considered status symbols in the community.

Death records of the city of New Orleans show that the Bayou St. John Cemetery was opened in 1835 for the corpses of people who died from the yellow fever epidemics. The location was selected because it was remote from the general populace of the city at the time and was thereby a safe place for burial in the epidemics. The cemetery was closed by the mid-1840s, and the exact location of the cemetery is uncertain today.

== Burial practices ==
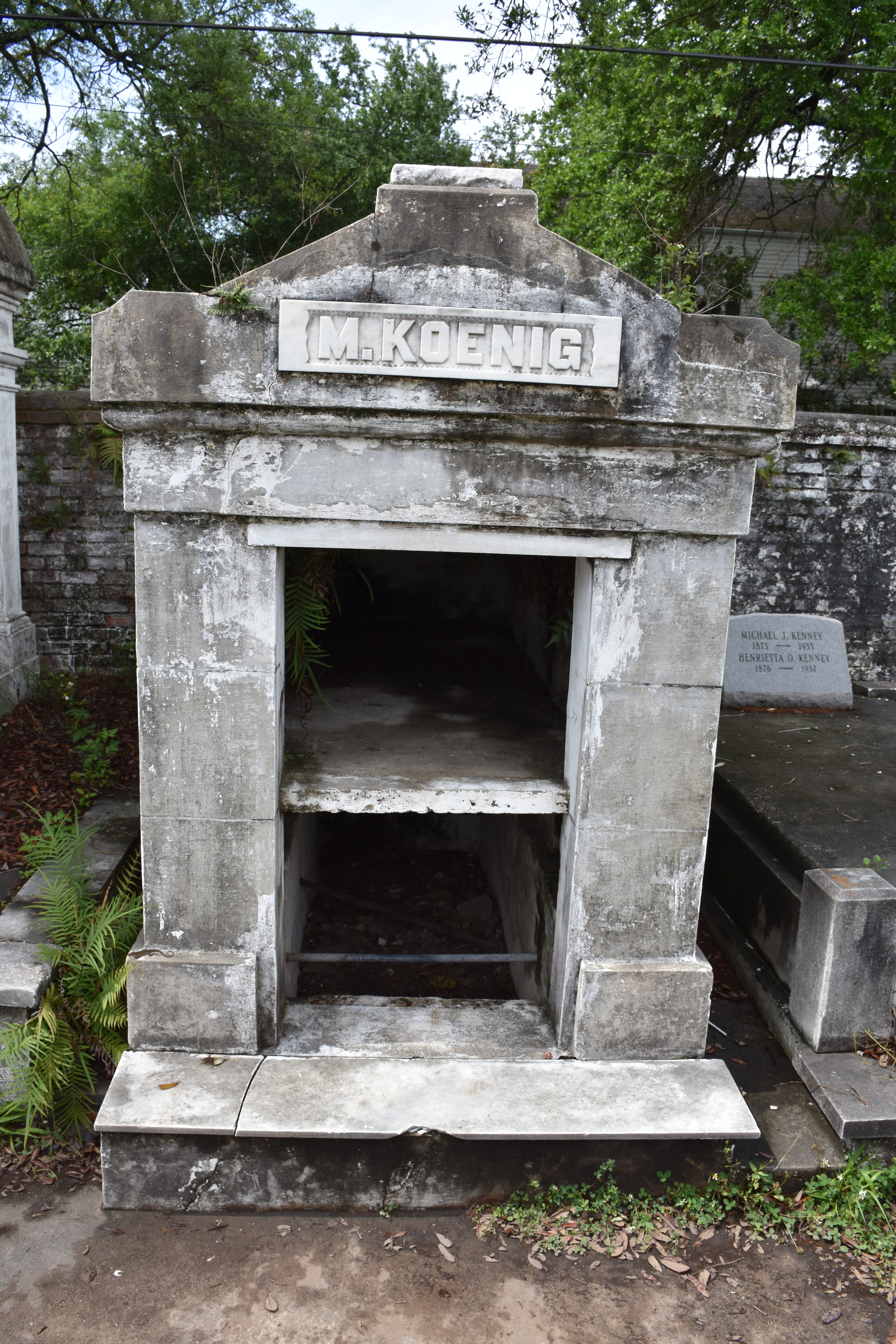
Open vaults on a tomb at Lafayette Cemetery No. 1. The caveau at the bottom of the tomb is visible.

For above-ground tombs in New Orleans, when a burial is needed, the cemetery sexton opens the outer tablet marking the opening to the vault of the tomb. The vaults typically are walled-off behind the tablet with brick, which also must be removed. The remains of the corpse that was most recently interred in the tomb are then placed in a bag and moved to the bottom of the tomb. In local lexicon, this space at the bottom of the tomb is referred to as a "caveau" or as a "receiving vault". Moving the remains in this way makes room for the remains of the corpse to be buried. By local tradition, the tomb cannot be opened again in this way for at least one year and one day; this will ensure that the corpse already in the tomb is exposed to one full New Orleans summer to allow for adequate decomposition. Following appropriate funerary ritual, the cemetery sexton again walls off the vault opening with brick and replaces the tablet. Generally the names of the deceased and their birth dates and death dates are chiseled onto the tablet or alternatively elsewhere on the tomb. The above-ground tombs are generally not air-tight, so that suitable gas exchange can occur for decomposition of the corpse. The tradition of waiting one year and one day between openings of the tomb was not always sufficient for adequate decomposition, even under the harsh conditions of the climate of New Orleans. These burial practices continue in contemporary times.

== Development of designs ==
By the early 19th century, as above-ground tombs became more common in New Orleans, tomb design reflected the Roman influences extensively used in European cemeteries at the time. Ancient Romans believed that the afterlife began at the tomb, and so suitable homage was to be paid to the dead in their final resting places. For these reasons, early above-ground tomb design was typically of brick, much larger than the casket with suitable ornamentation for homage.

Columbaria began to appear in tomb design in New Orleans in the early 19th century. These are walled structures with chambers or niches for individual burials in close proximity, thereby lowering burial costs. People of modest means could not afford elaborate tomb structures and so they pooled their resources to construct columbaria, enabling burial of the remains of multiple people. These could be as caskets or of their ashes in urns. Benefit societies often constructed the columbaria.

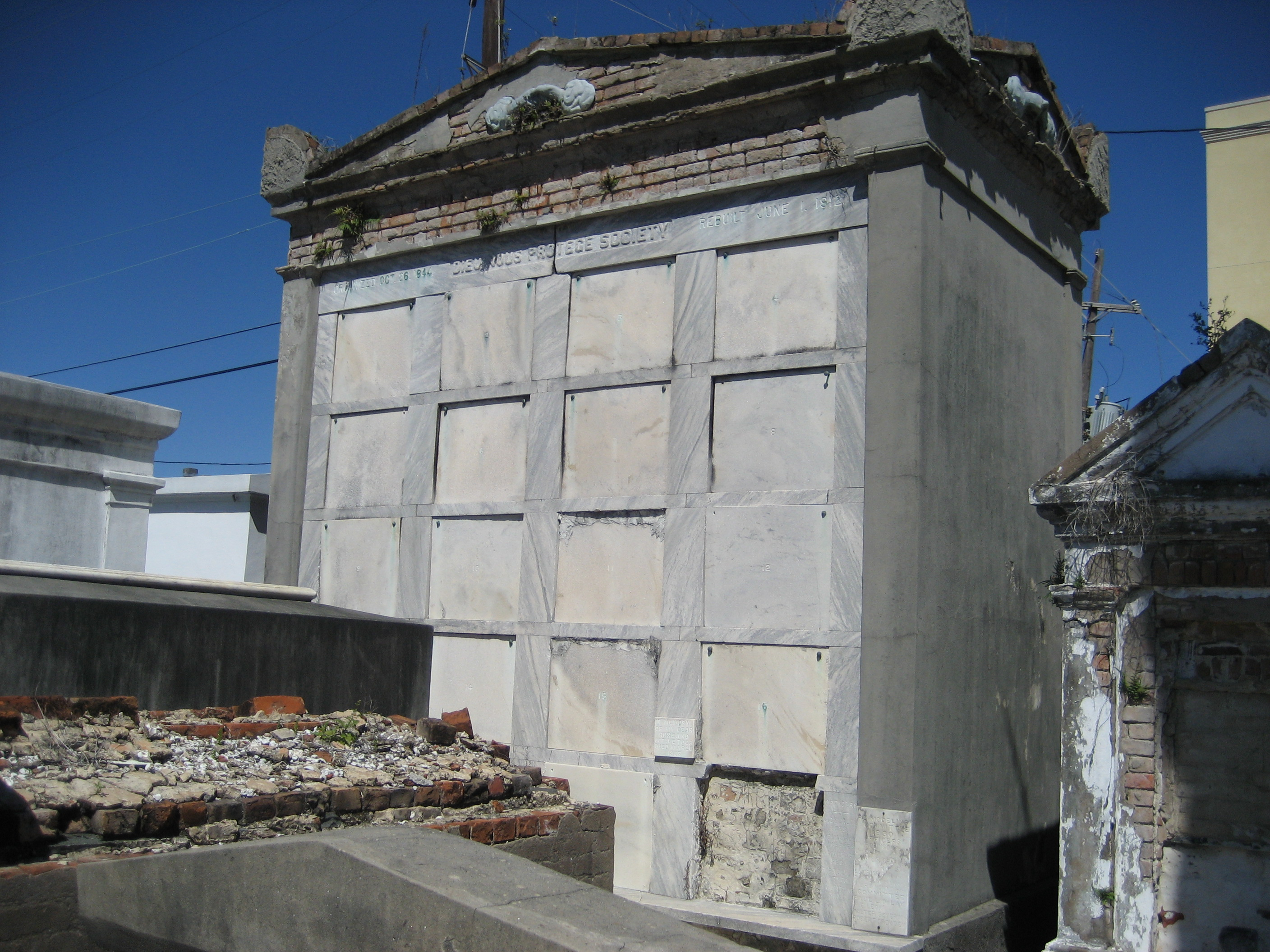
Oven Tombs of the Dieu Nous Protege Society at St. Louis Cemetery No. 1

As the city of New Orleans continued to grow rapidly in the early 19th century, the need for burial of large numbers of people of modest means came about. To address this need, oven tombs were built in cemeteries such as St. Louis Cemetery No. 1. In these designs, vaults or crypts or niches are built into a wall of a cemetery or in an above ground tomb. The corpse is placed into the vault. In the hot, subtropical climate of New Orleans, the corpse decomposes relatively rapidly so that after approximately a year, only bones remain. After that time, the bones or other remains are moved, typically to the ground in the oven tomb, making room for burial of newly deceased in the vacated vault. The deceased are typically commemorated with plaques or other inscriptions on an external surface of the tomb. In this way, large numbers of deceased can be buried in a single tomb, often dozens. In many cases, the oven tombs belonged to families.

St. Louis Cemetery No. 1 had a section that permitted burial of people who were members of protestant faiths. In 1821, the city of New Orleans demolished much of the protestant section to construct Tremé Street. The Girod Street Cemetery was opened in 1822 as a dedicated Protestant cemetery. In 1828, the Gates of Mercy Cemetery opened for Jewish burials. The Jewish faith at the time required in-ground interments, and so Gates of Mercy Cemetery made use of copings, which were in-ground burials in a raised bed. It was built by the Israelite Congregation Shanarai Chasset to serve Jewish people of German background, and it was located in the Lafayette section of New Orleans, which was a suburb at the time.

By 1830, cemeteries in New Orleans had evolved from desolate burial grounds into architecturally distinct settings with city-street layouts, or "cities of the dead".

=== Architects and masons ===
==== Funerary architecture of J. N. B. de Pouilly ====
French architect Jacques Nicolas Bussière de Pouilly arrived in New Orleans in 1833. He is reputed to have studied at the École des Beaux-Arts. By the time of his arrival in New Orleans, the city had transformed from a colonial outpost to a thriving metropolis in the United States. He brought with him to the new city a variety of Parisian architectural styles which were of considerable appeal to local citizens.

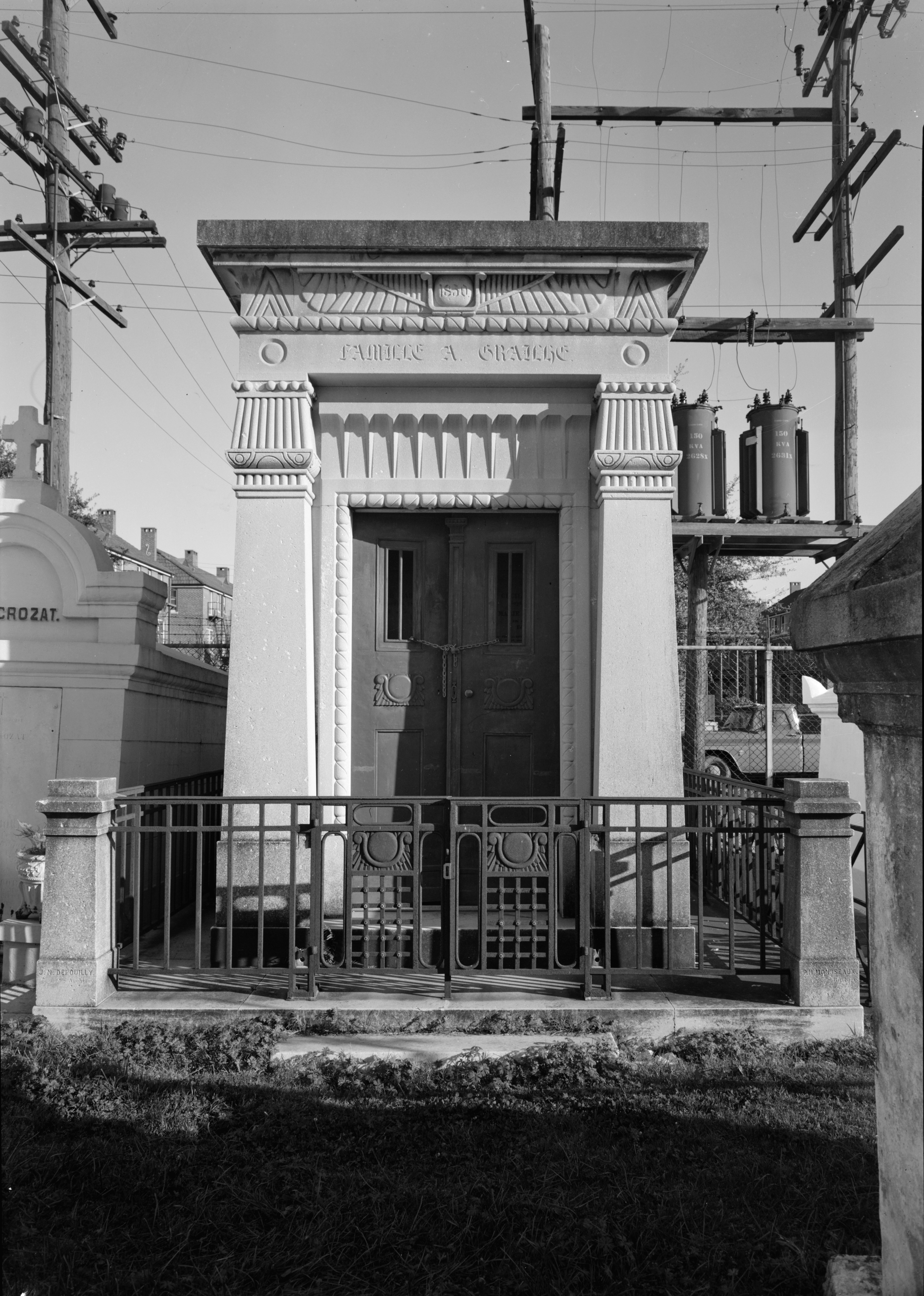
Grailhe Family Tomb, as seen in 1965

De Pouilly's first major architectural project was the City Exchange Hotel (later St. Louis Hotel) in the French Quarter, which he obtained by winning a competition in 1835. By the time the hotel opened in 1838, de Pouilly earned a significant reputation in the city. He then completed a variety of residential and commercial projects in the city. During this time period, de Pouilly acquired partial ownership in a granite and marble yard near the St. Louis Cemeteries. He also began a productive collaboration with New Orleans builder Ernest Goudchaux which facilitated many of de Pouilly's projects.

De Pouilly's first significant cemetery project came when New Orleans merchant Alexandre Grailhe commissioned de Pouilly to design an elaborate Egyptian revival family tomb in St. Louis Cemetery No. 2. Construction of this tomb commenced in 1850. A series of other cemetery projects followed for de Pouilly, mostly at the St. Louis Cemetery No. 2 and mostly for local people of considerable financial means. His designs were heavily influenced by the architecture found in the Parisian cemetery Père Lachaise.

De Pouilly's reputation as an architect was damaged by two incidents concerning his projects. He had undertaken a reconstruction of the St. Louis Cathedral. However, in 1850, the central tower collapsed, damaging the roof and walls. De Pouilly had also renovated the Orleans Theatre in 1845. In 1854, the theatre collapsed, killing several people and injuring approximately forty others. While the responsibility for the incidents was shared with the builders, de Pouilly's reputation was sufficiently reduced that he specialized in cemetery projects thereafter.

Following the two incidents, de Pouilly had a productive period of tomb design for New Orleans cemeteries, emphasizing projects for wealthy families and also for benevolent organizations. To achieve designs suitable for his clients, de Pouilly made use of carved marble and granite, molded plaster, and cast-iron railings, all in styles that often carried historic significance or symbolism. He, at times during this period of his career, taught drawing at Audubon College. De Pouilly remained active in tomb design until his death in 1875.

Florville Foy was a free man of color who was frequently commissioned to build De Pouilly's tomb designs through much of the nineteenth century in New Orleans. He built a successful business as a marble cutter and sculptor to serve funerary needs.

De Pouilly documented some of his projects in sketchbooks, at least one of which is maintained by the Historic New Orleans Collection.

=== Types of tombs ===
In the late 18th century through the middle of the nineteenth century, the majority of the tombs were box tombs and step tombs. These accommodated a single coffin resting directly on the ground with four walls made of brick, often covered with stucco, and a nearly flat roof. The step tombs had stepbacks, providing more design options.

External videos
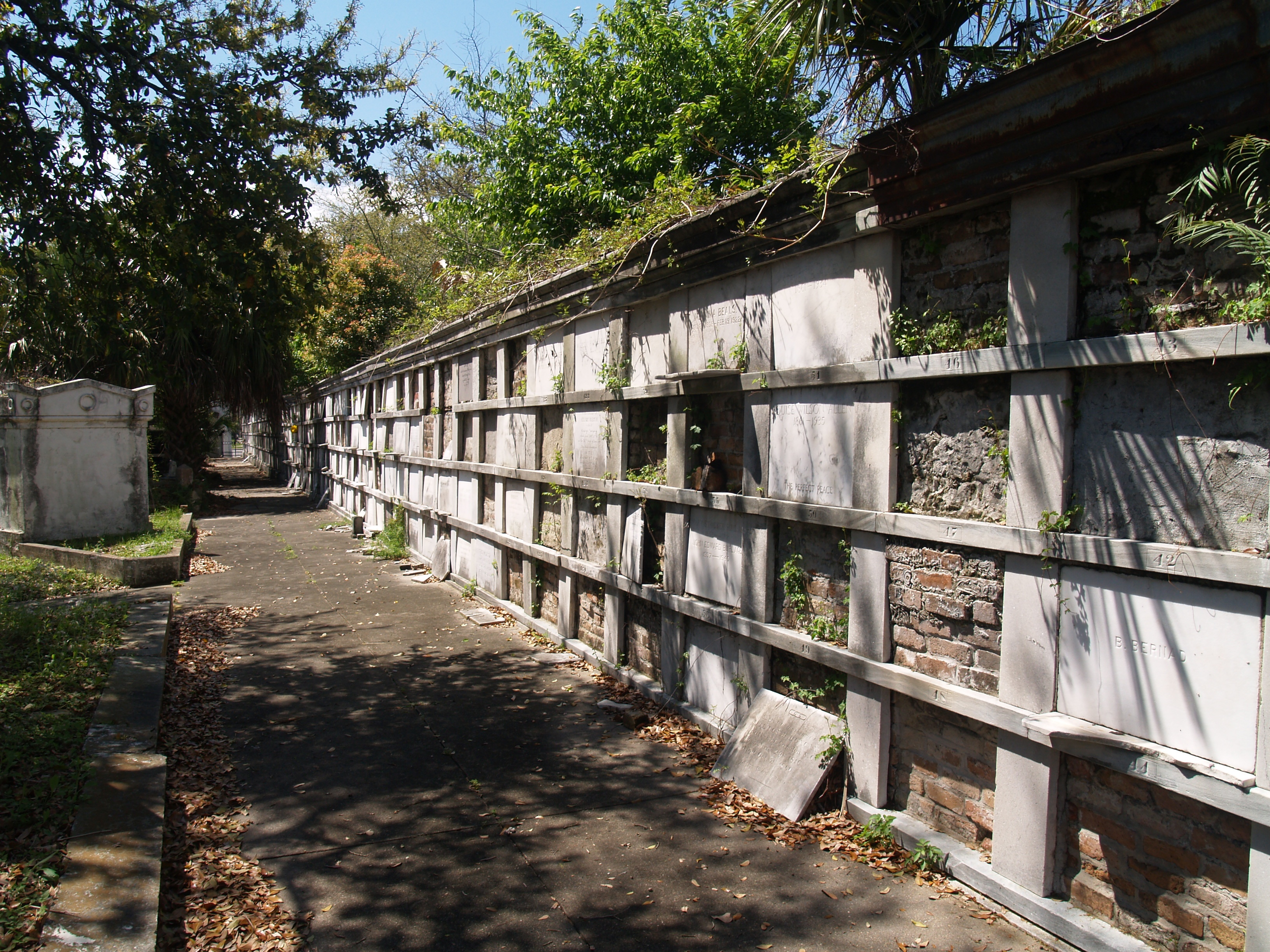
- A walking tour of oven vaults at a historic New Orleans cemetery

By the early nineteenth century and extending into the middle of the twentieth century, various types of wall tombs were constructed. These included oven tombs, wall vault tombs, and block vault tombs, which were architectural variations of single-burial chambers constructed along the walls at the periphery of the cemeteries or else on free-standing cemetery buildings. The various types of wall tombs generally had individual chambers stacked on top of one another, usually four chambers high. At times, the deceased in any given chamber could be replaced with another. Some of these were society tombs.

Family tombs and society tombs included a variety of architectural types and styles. These included pediment tombs, parapet tombs, platform tombs, pediment tombs with barrel-shaped vaults, and ones with structures like sarcophagi built on top of the tomb. Other tombs were monuments. Styles included neoclassical, Greek revival, Egyptian revival, gothic revival, Romanesque revival, Renaissance revival, and Byzantine revival.

By the middle of the nineteenth century, large, multi-vaulted tombs became common in New Orleans cemeteries. These were much larger than family tombs, rendering them more affordable to the individual. These tombs were constructed by mutual aid societies, fraternal organizations, and labor unions. Consistent with the times, they were segregated by race in addition to religion. Frequent epidemics at the time, especially of yellow fever and cholera, bolstered demand for more cemeteries, larger tombs, and mutual aid. By the latter part of the nineteenth century, the cost to the individual for burial in the society tombs was approximately $100 USD. Over a period of decades, hundreds of individuals were buried in some society tombs.

Cemetery architects devised other means of accommodating burials in the high water table of New Orleans. Most common were the coping graves. Soil was built up above the ground held in place with walls, so that the deceased can be placed in ground but still above the water table. The coping graves were most prevalent in Jewish cemeteries, in keeping with the Jewish tradition of in-ground burial.

==== Association funerary monuments ====
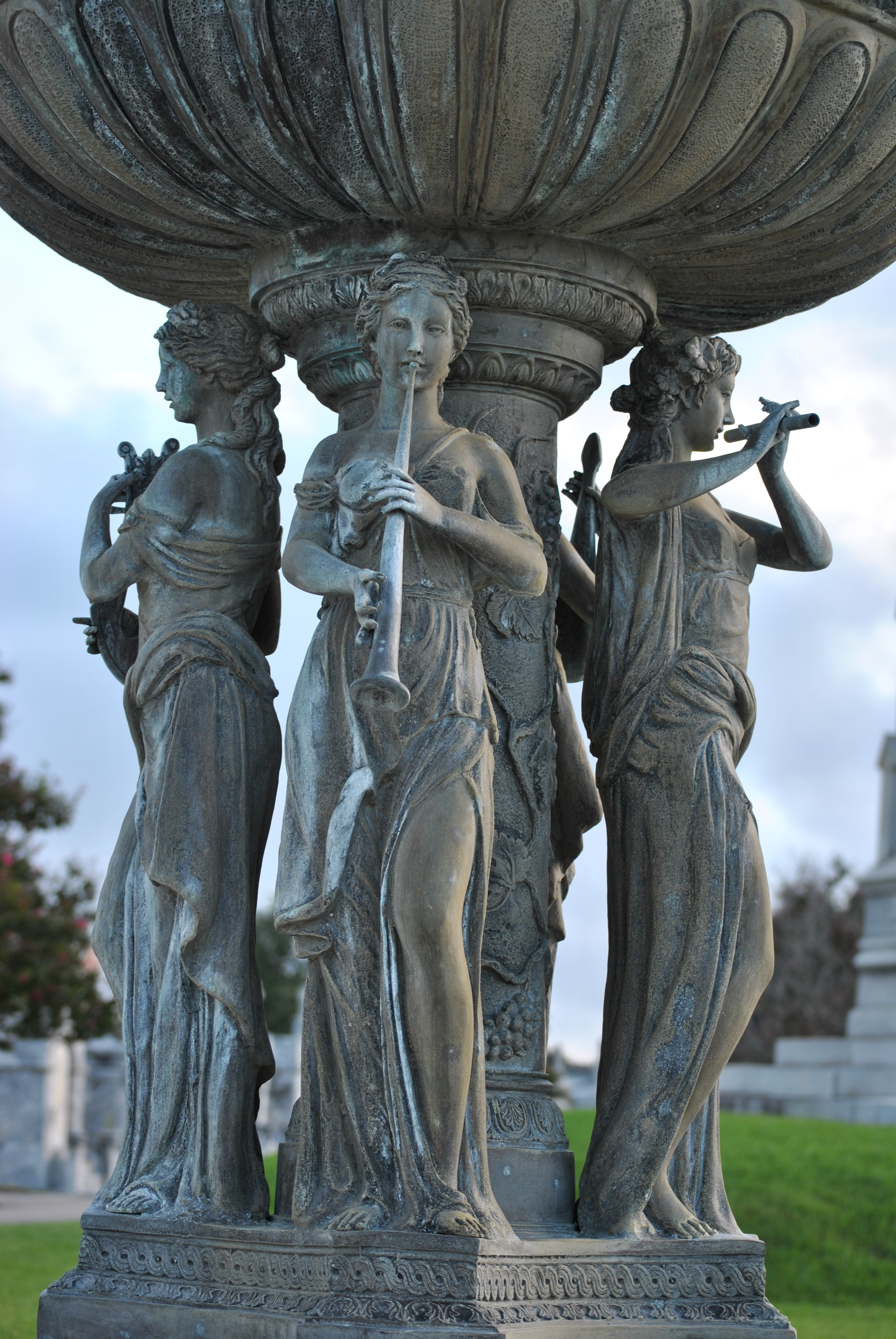
Statue of the Muses at Greenwood Cemetery

The Firemen's Benevolent Association established the Cypress Grove Cemetery. The association subsequently opened their cemetery to people who were not members of their association. Other society tombs of the era included the Masons, the Independent Order of Odd Fellows, and the Protective Order of Elks. Trade unions also built association funerary monuments. An early example was the New Orleans Typographical Union, which was the first labor union in the city. They completed their association tomb in Greenwood Cemetery in 1855.

The role of benevolent societies in funerals and cemetery management began to decline by the latter part of the nineteenth century and nearly disappeared as the need for them was supplanted by the New Deal and other forms of social safety net.

=== Ethnic influences ===
The society tombs of the nineteenth century were often constructed by various ethnic groups. The New Orleans Italian Mutual Benevolent Society commissioned Italian artist Pietro Gualdi to design and build its society tomb in St. Louis Cemetery Number 1, being complete in 1856. Gualdi's design reflected motifs from the Italian Renaissance and Baroque periods.

The Song On Tong Association built a society tomb in the Cypress Grove Cemetery, complete in 1904. The design of this tomb suited the needs of the Chinese immigrant population that it served. The cemetery faced east, toward the rising sun, consistent with traditions in Chinese architecture. The design included space inside the tomb for funerary offerings, such as burnt incense and food for the dead. The intent of the tomb was for temporary interment until the dead could be returned to China for permanent burial.

Early in the 20th century, the Zulu Social Aid & Pleasure Club served as a fraternal organization for African-Americans in New Orleans that served to provide tombs for its members and their families.

=== Potter's fields ===
Burial of less affluent people in New Orleans in the early nineteenth century often occurred in wall vaults that were in established cemeteries. Their families paid a rent for this. If the family failed to pay the rent, the corpse would be removed from the wall vault. The Locust Grove Cemetery No. 1 opened as a potter's field in 1859 in the uptown section of New Orleans. Locust Grove Cemetery No. 2 opened up nearby in 1877, also as a potter's field. Both closed in 1879 and were subsequently demolished. An elementary school and playground were subsequently built on the sites of these two cemeteries.

In the latter part of the nineteenth century, Holt Cemetery was built as a potter's field for burial of the indigent. Carrollton Cemetery, at times known as the Green Street Cemetery, also had a portion of its graveyard that served as a potter's field. Charity Hospital Cemetery was also for burial of indigent people. At these locations, interment was typically as a shallow in-ground grave. These locations contain the dead of a disproportionate number of African-American people.

Through much of the history of New Orleans, extended through the end of the Jim Crow South, cemeteries in New Orleans remained segregated. Although burial of African-Americans was permitted in the established cemeteries, these took place in sections demarcated for them.

=== Rural garden cemeteries ===
In 1872, Metairie Cemetery opened on the outskirts of New Orleans, located on relatively high ground along the Metairie Ridge. It was the first example of a rural garden cemetery in the city. Despite bearing the name of a New Orleans suburban community, Metairie Cemetery resides within the city limits of New Orleans. This cemetery does not reflect in any strong way the Spanish, French, or Creole influences seen in previous historic cemeteries in New Orleans. Many affluent people are buried there, and the tombs reflect a variety of individual styles. The cemetery contains tombs for a significant number of celebrities and other historically important people. It came to be known colloquially as "Suburbs of the Dead".

Construction of several other rural garden cemeteries followed the opening of Metairie Cemetery. Notable was the Woodlawn Memorial Park Cemetery, opened in 1939, adjacent to Metairie Cemetery just over the parish line in Jefferson Parish, Louisiana. Built on relatively high ground, this cemetery was initially only for in-ground burials. Over the years, families of the deceased adopted the tradition in the New Orleans area of building above ground tombs to commemorate the dead.

=== Military cemeteries ===
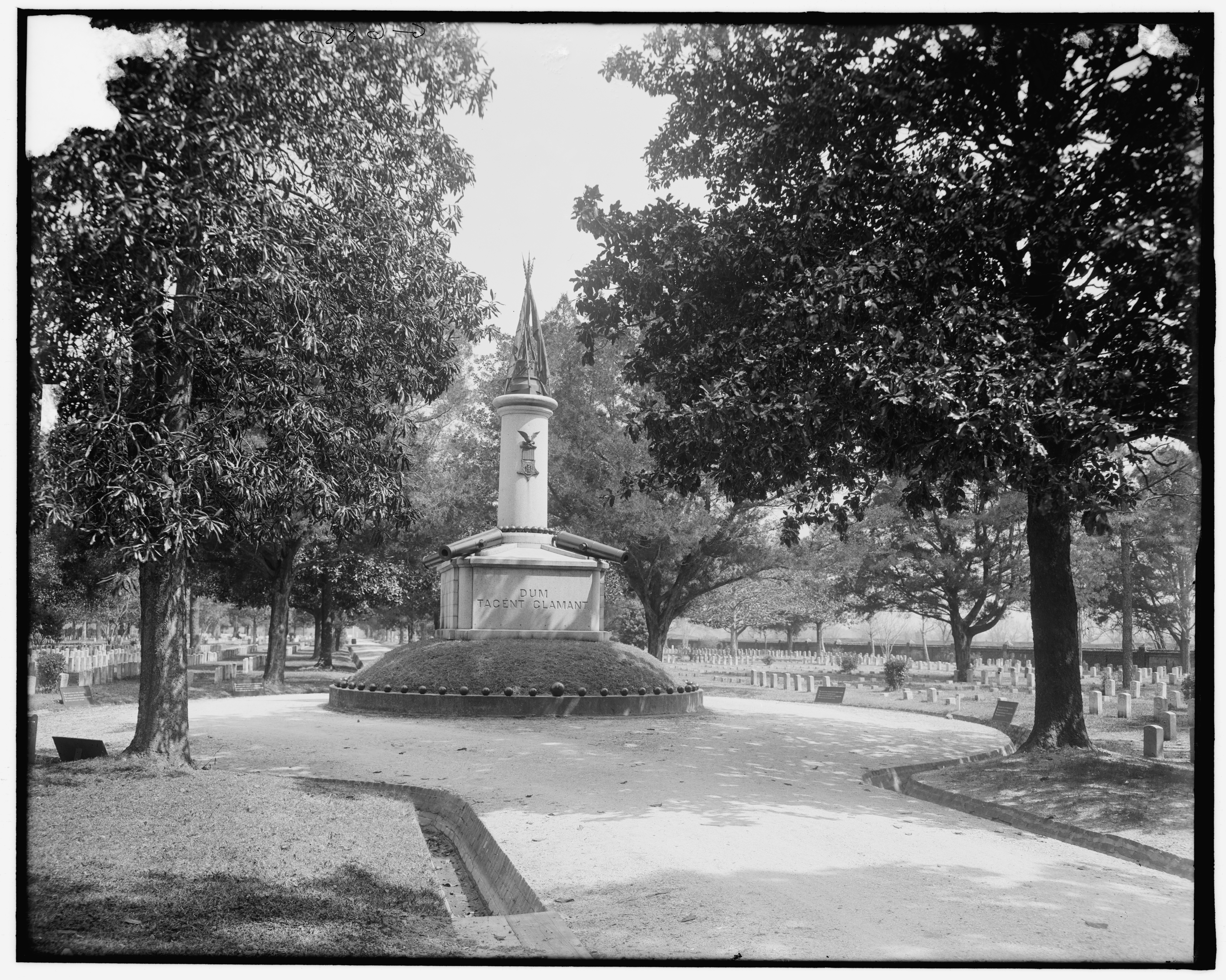
Grand Army of the Republic Memorial at the Chalmette National Cemetery, circa 1910

The Chalmette National Cemetery opened in New Orleans in 1864 during the American Civil War. It was created as a result of authorization by the United States Congress to create cemeteries to honor soldiers who died in military conflict. The Chalmette National Cemetery was built on the site of the Battle of New Orleans, in eastern New Orleans, where many soldiers died in the War of 1812. The original purpose of the cemetery was to inter Union soldiers who died in Louisiana during the American Civil War. However, civilians were also buried there. Approximately 7000 deceased troops buried in various local cemeteries were re-interred there. There were approximately 7000 African-American civilians were also buried in Chalmette National Cemetery. Shortly after the American Civil War, these were re-interred at a new Freedmen's Cemetery adjacent to Chalmette National Cemetery. Confederate troops buried there were also re-interred at other cemeteries in New Orleans.

In 1874, veterans of the Union Army constructed the Grand Army of the Republic Monument on the grounds of the Chalmette National Cemetery to commemorate the soldiers who died in the Union cause.

Although military burials continued at the Chalmette National Cemetery into the time of the Vietnam War, the cemetery was supplanted in 2014 by the Southeast Louisiana Veterans Cemetery.

== Contemporary times ==
Through the 20th century, the Historic Cemeteries of New Orleans came under increasing neglect and disrepair, even though many of them continued to accept new burials. The deterioration was evident even at the beginning of the 20th century. A 1906 article in the New Orleans Daily Picayune newspaper stated, "There are vaults and tombs so far decayed and rotten that the passer-by can look within and see iron caskets that have been resting there for perhaps half a decade", a statement made in reference to the Girod Street Cemetery.

The Holt Cemetery, a potter's field, in particular showed severe neglect, with human remains being evident above ground, even though it was actively being used for new burials.

=== Causes of deterioration ===
Cemetery maintenance in New Orleans has posed special challenges due to lands sinking in the soft, moist soil and local floods. The semi-tropical climate of the region was harsh on above ground tombs. Human activity, including looting, vandalism, and willful destruction, took its toll. The problem was further exacerbated by inconsistent care by families that owned tombs. The decline of the benevolent societies by the early 20th century led to neglect of their tombs. While cemetery operators offered perpetual care plans to maintain tombs for a flat fee in perpetuity, these were not widely subscribed, and cemetery operators sometimes inappropriately practiced perpetual care.

=== Restoration ===
An early restoration effort commenced in 1923 by the Society for the Preservation of Ancient Tombs, led by noted local author Grace King. The organization numbered approximately 150 members but had limited resources. It emphasized restoration of tombs of notable people. They also located descendants of notable people to enlist their aid in restoration.

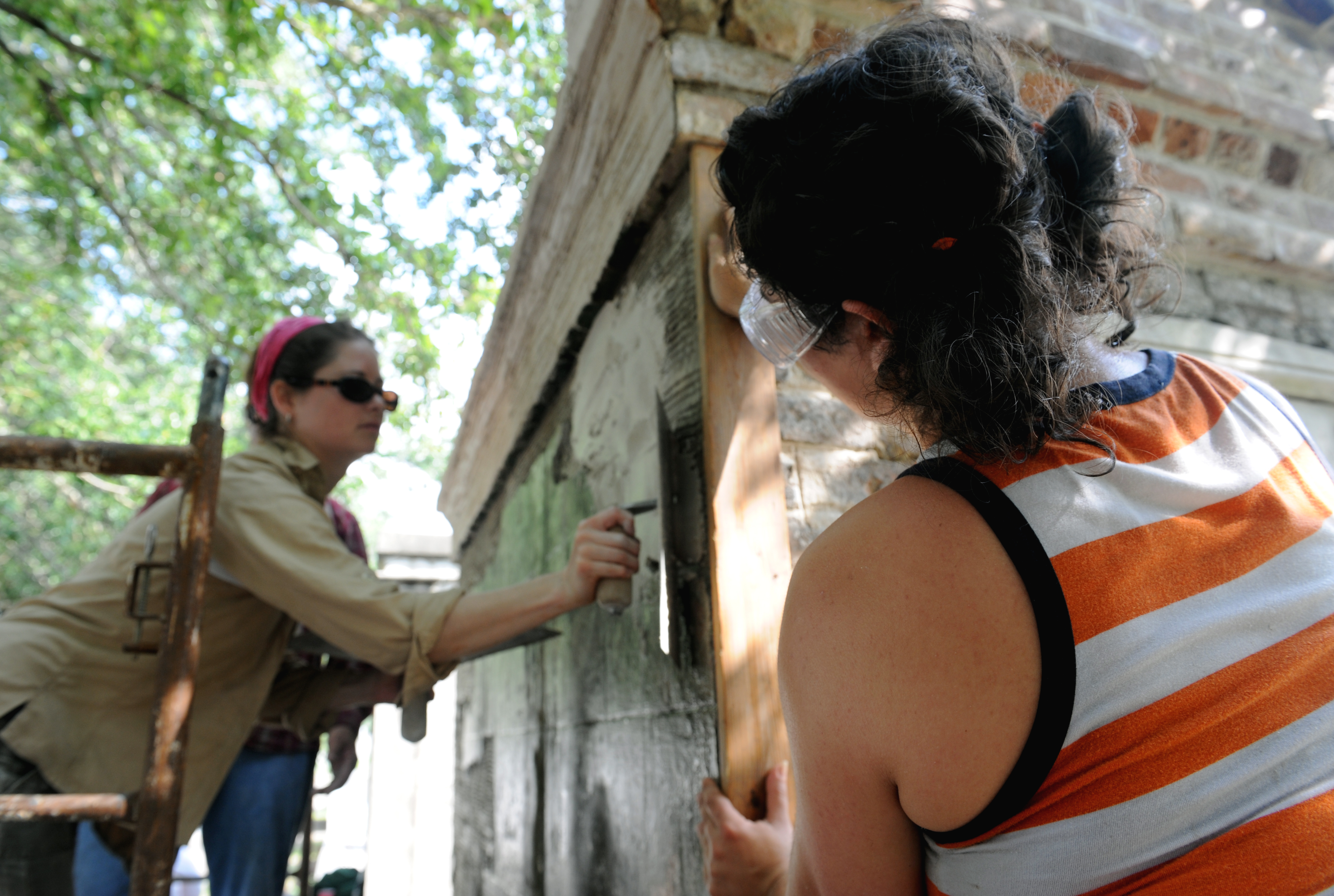
Cemetery restoration

By the mid-1970s, deterioration of the historic cemeteries of New Orleans was significant. A 1974 report by the New Orleans Times-Picayune newspaper, in reference to the decay at the cemeteries, coined the phrase "Slums of the Dead". The state board of health said that some tombs had become public health hazards. Additionally two had been demolished, the Girod Street Cemetery and the Gates of Mercy Cemetery. As a result, in 1974, the Louisiana State Legislature passed laws prohibiting the destruction of cemeteries.

Various civil organizations became engaged in restoration and preservation of these, most notable being Save Our Cemeteries. This organization, originally led by preservationist Mary Louise Christovich, sought to raise public awareness of the condition of the historic cemeteries in the city and to raise funds for restoration. It obtained funds from the Save America's Treasures program and led efforts to list specific cemeteries in New Orleans on the National Register of Historic Places.

In the 21st century, various firms are committed to restoration of the historic cemeteries of the southeast Louisiana region either as a non-profit enterprise or for restoration of individual tombs as a business enterprise. Additionally, the Archdiocese of New Orleans has an initiative to restore abandoned tombs in the historic cemeteries in their charge.

In the early 2010s, the Center for Architectural Conservation at the University of Pennsylvania carried out the "Dead Space Project" to detail the conditions and provide a risk assessment at some of the historic cemeteries of New Orleans. The program made use of geographic information systems for this purpose.

Some cemeteries of historical significance in other locales have provided models for restoration of New Orleans cemeteries, such as Laurel Hill Cemetery of Philadelphia, Pennsylvania, Glasnevin Cemetery of Dublin, Ireland, and Bonaventure Cemetery of Savannah, Georgia.

=== Cemetery management ===
Under the auspices of the Archdiocese of New Orleans, in contemporary times, New Orleans Catholic Cemeteries owns and operates 13 of the historic cemeteries. The New Orleans Office of Property Management maintains six of the historic cemeteries in the city.

In 1918, Mt. Olivet Cemetery was established in the Gentilly neighborhood of New Orleans to serve the needs of African-Americans, Creoles, people of Middle Eastern origin, and other ethnic minorities. It is an uncommon example of a for-profit cemetery in New Orleans, being owned and managed by Service Corporation International, a firm that specializes in deathcare. There are three known examples of African-American veterans of the United States Civil War who are buried at Mt. Olivet Cemetery.

=== Hurricane Katrina Memorial ===
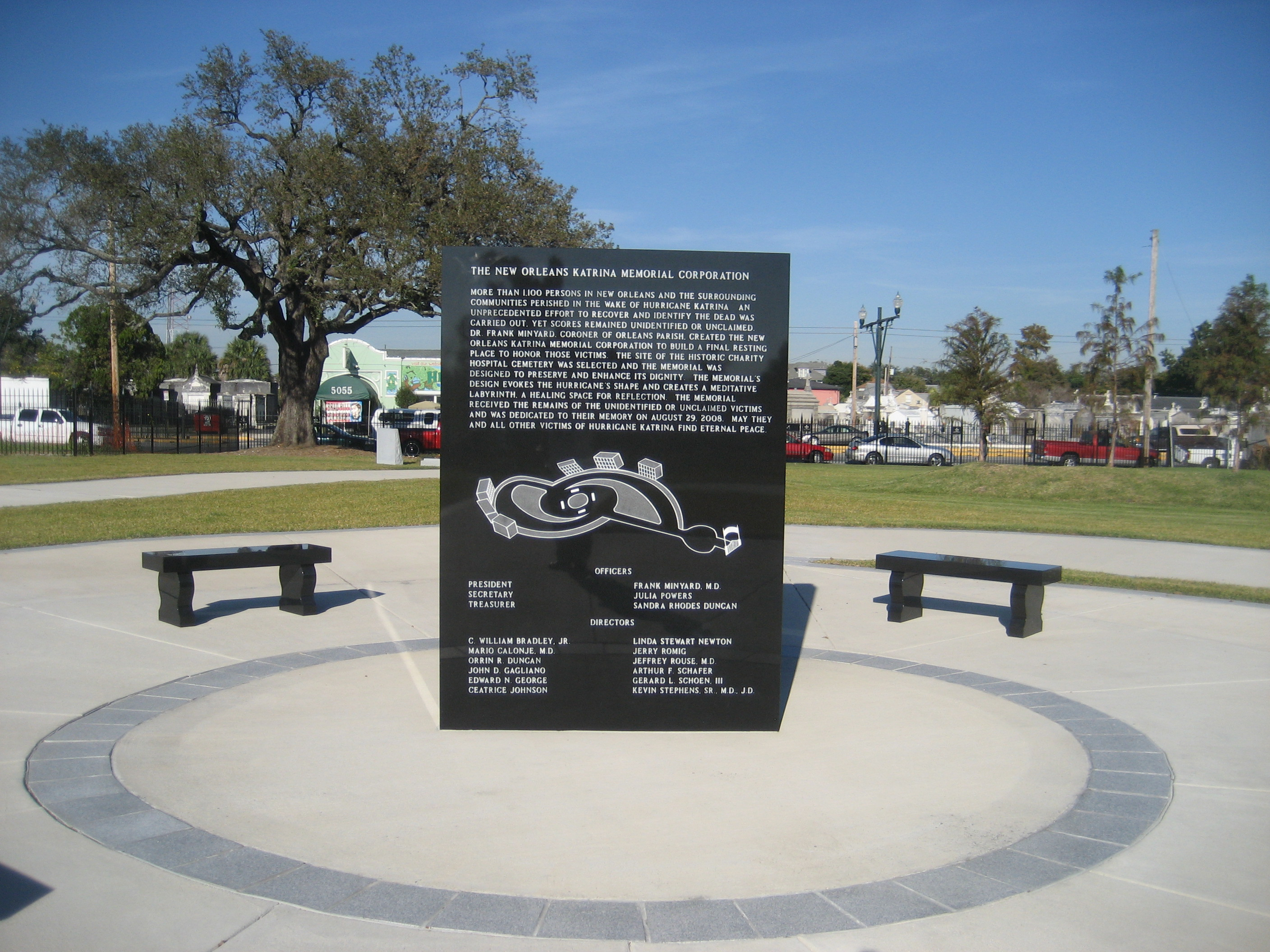
Central Monument on the Hurricane Katrina Memorial Cemetery (photo courtesy of Infrogmation)

The Hurricane Katrina Memorial is a mausoleum housing the remains of unidentified victims of Hurricane Katrina, which struck New Orleans in 2005. As such, it is the newest of the cemeteries in New Orleans to have historic significance. The memorial was completed and dedicated in 2008. The memorial is located on a parcel of land that was part of the Charity Hospital Cemetery, on Canal Street near a group of twelve historically significant cemeteries.

Hurricane Katrina resulted in approximately 80 unidentified human corpses in New Orleans. These were stored by local morticians in refrigerated warehouses for sometime after the storm. The local morticians and other leaders of the funeral industry believed that the unidentified deceased from the storm deserved a proper burial. They pooled their resources to construct the mausoleum that would serve as a memorial to those who died in Hurricane Katrina. Their design included a set of six small mausoleums arranged around a central moment. The central monument symbolizes eye of the hurricane. The design also included landscaped walkways curving out from the central moment to suggest the paths of the hurricane's winds radiating outward.

Dedication of the Hurricane Katrina Memorial Mausoleum occurred on August 29, 2008, which was the third anniversary of the day that Hurricane Katrina struck New Orleans. The ceremony was significantly curtailed because the day of the dedication was the same day that Hurricane Gustav threatened to make landfall at New Orleans.

=== Tomb of the Unknown Slave ===
The Tomb of the Unknown Slave is located near St. Augustine Church in the Tremé Historic Neighborhood of New Orleans. It is a monument to the many unmarked graves of slaves who died in the antebellum era of the United States. It was constructed under the auspices of Father Jerome LeDoux and parishioners at the St. Augustine Church and dedicated in 2004.

=== Jazz funerals ===
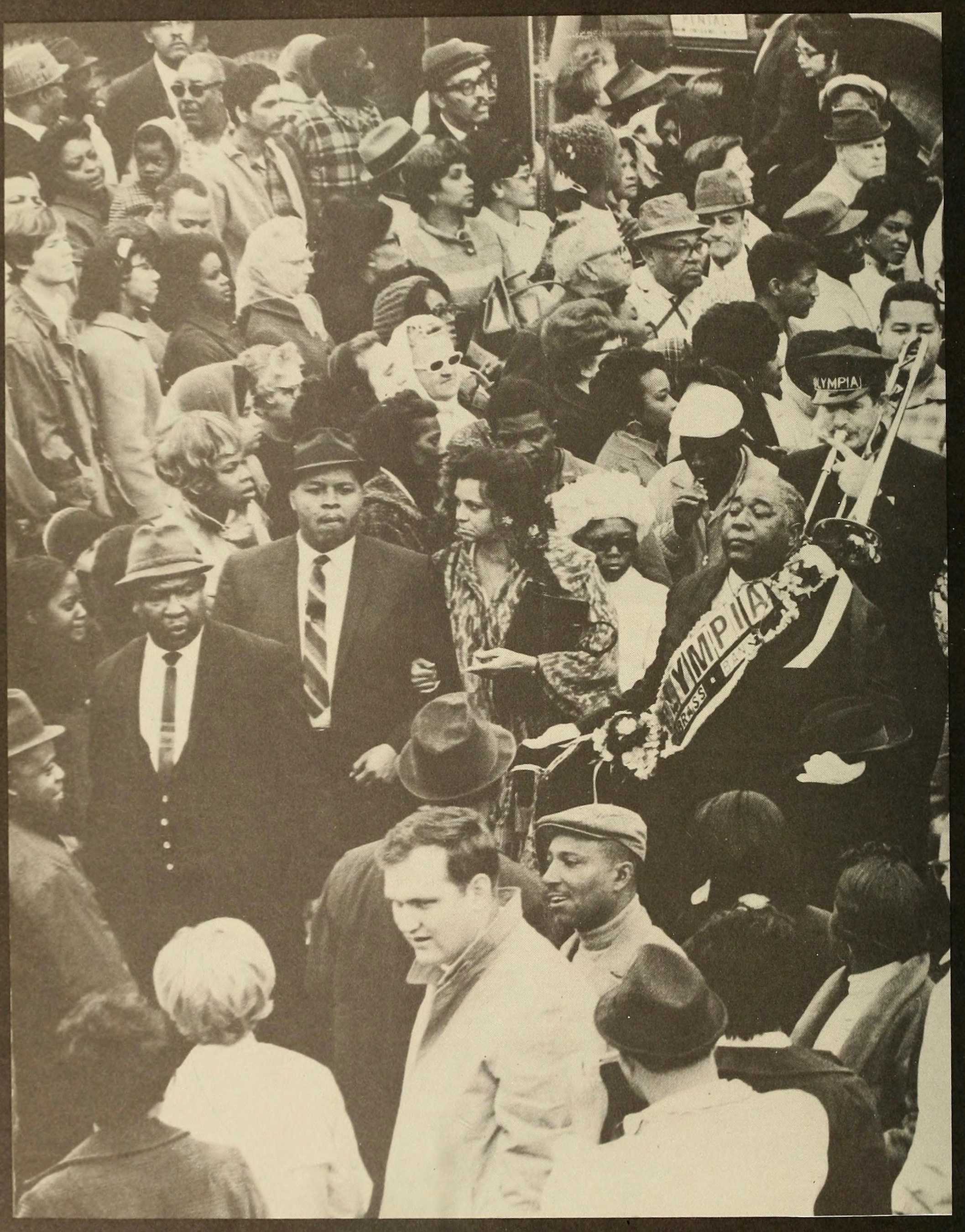
Jazz Funeral, Tulane University yearbook, 1969

In addition to architectural aspects of New Orleans cemeteries, musical traditions have historically been part of laying the dead to rest in New Orleans. By 1868 the Masons included showmanship as part of their funeral processions at cemeteries in New Orleans. All Saints Day was also a festive event at New Orleans cemeteries in the latter nineteenth century through the early twentieth century.

Benevolent societies in New Orleans in the middle of the nineteenth century began to include pageantry as part of unveiling their society tombs. These preceded the widespread practice of Jazz funerals, the origin of which began with African-American slaves in New Orleans. Examples from this time period include the German Washington Benevolent Association and the New Lusitanos Benevolent Association.

These festivities eventually extended to include Jazz funerals, typically originating at a church and ending with musical performances in the cemetery itself. The West African burial tradition of lamentations culminating in joviality was observed in New Orleans at funerals as early as 1819. By the time of emancipation from slavery, brass bands became commonplace at funerals of African-Americans in New Orleans. With the rise of benevolent associations for African-Americans in New Orleans, jazz funerals could be had for a suitable fee. In contemporary times, these have included men and women who have died tragically at a young age. Jazz funerals are often spectacles at cemeteries in New Orleans.

=== Tourism ===
Since early in the nineteenth century, cemeteries in New Orleans were gathering places for locals. Over time, lore evolved about many of the historic cemeteries, such as about the voodoo queen Marie Laveau. The lore has engendered interest within the tourism industry in New Orleans, as have the Jazz funerals. The cemeteries are architecturally distinct, particularly in comparison to others in the United States. While the cemeteries were not an original part of the city's design, as the city grew, their presence became unmistakable. The community focus on the cemeteries, the architecture, proximity, and lore all gave rise to tourist interest in the Historic Cemeteries of New Orleans.

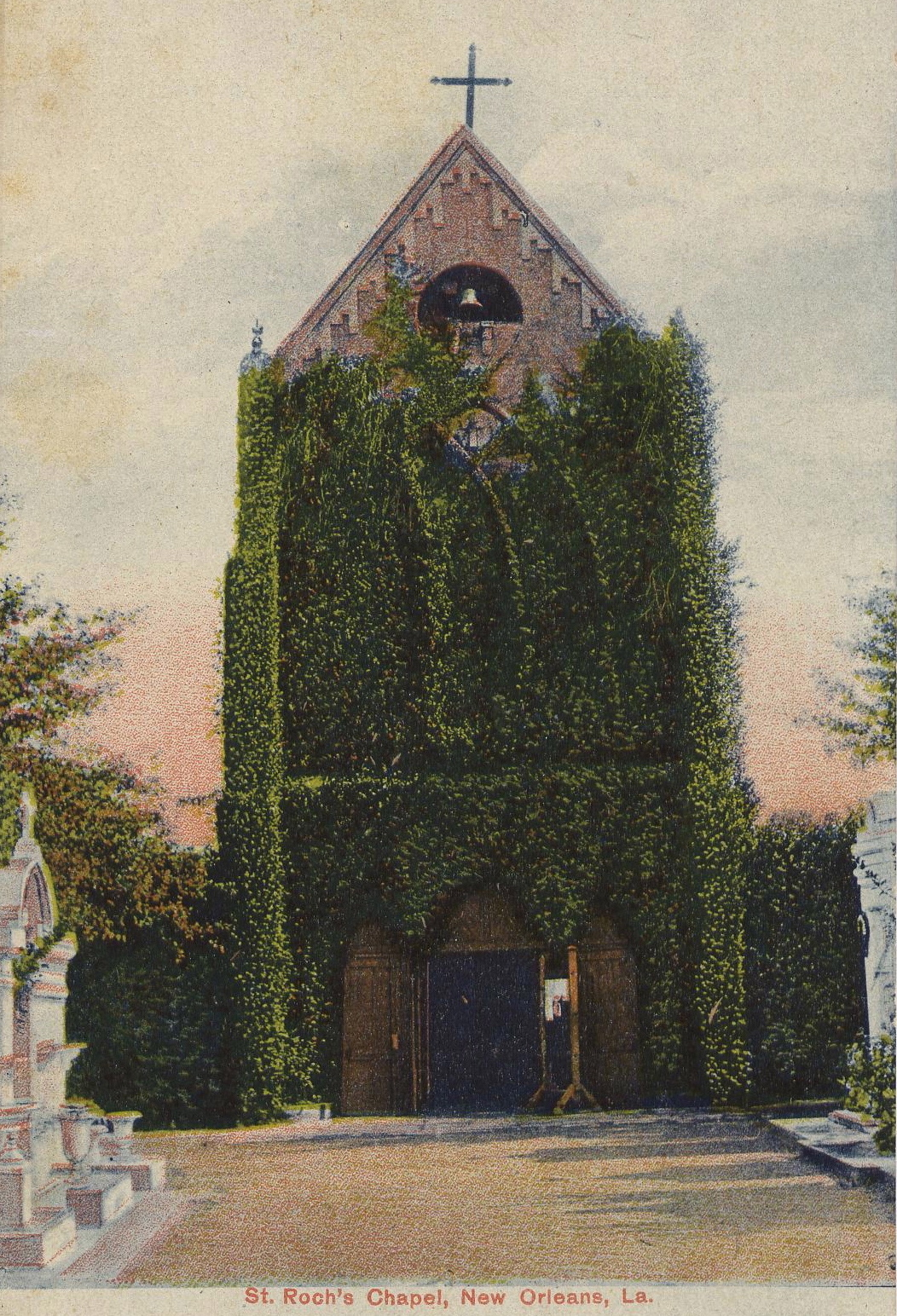
St. Roch Cemetery Chapel (postcard image courtesy of Infrogmation)

The Louisiana Superdome is built proximate to the site of the former Girod Street Cemetery. In an example of contemporary lore, some people have attributed the long-standing struggles of the New Orleans Saints to a curse resulting from their home field being built on a historic cemetery.

St. Roch Cemetery No. 1 has a chapel built in a Gothic style, St. Michael's Chapel Mausoleum. The chapel is used for religious purposes and is open to visitors including tourists. It displays various prosthetics, crutches, coins and thank-you notes. The paraphernalia there provides interest to tourists.

A study commissioned by the New Orleans Tourism Marketing Corporation determined that 42% of visitors to the city consider the historic cemeteries to be worthwhile places to visit. At present, several private tour companies provide organized tours of several of the historic cemeteries, emphasizing St. Louis Cemetery No. 1. This cemetery is not open to the general public except through organized tours. The Archdiocese of New Orleans uses proceeds from tours for tomb restoration. While exact numbers of tourist to the historic New Orleans cemeteries is unknown, it is many thousands each year.

The phrase "Cities of the Dead" was first used by Mark Twain to describe the historic cemeteries of New Orleans. In his book "Life on the Mississippi", Twain stated "There is no architecture in New Orleans, except in the cemeteries". The phrase "Cities of the Dead" has remained a catchphrase in New Orleans tourism.

Several of these cemeteries are used as settings for television shows, movies, and music videos, most especially the Lafayette Cemetery No. 1 in the Garden District of New Orleans.

== List of historic cemeteries in New Orleans ==
This list is given in the order in which the cemeteries were founded, with supporting information in the reference except where otherwise noted. The term "extant" refers to cemeteries still in existence.

| Name | Year established | Type | Status | Notes |
|---|---|---|---|---|
| St. Peter Street Cemetery | 1700s | Roman Catholic | Defunct | Closed in 1800; Archeologically significant |
| St. Louis Cemetery No. 1 | 1789 | Roman Catholic | Extant | In-ground burial at first Above ground tombs first appeared in 1804 |
| Girod Street Cemetery | 1822 | Protestant | Defunct | Closed in 1940, Bodies relocated Demolished in 1957 |
| St. Louis Cemetery No. 2 | 1823 | Roman Catholic | Extant | Many de Pouilly designed tombs |
| Gates of Mercy Cemetery | 1828 | Jewish | Defunct | Demolished in 1957; Remains moved to Hebrew Rest Cemetery |
| Lafayette Cemetery No. 1 | 1833 | Non-denominational | Extant | Located in the historic city of Lafayette; Historically non-segregated |
| Cypress Grove Cemetery | 1840 | Benevolent associations | Extant | Firemen's Benevolent and Charitable Association; Egyptian Revival main entrance |
| St. Patrick Cemeteries Nos. 1,2,3 | 1841 | Irish Catholic | Extant | Many in-ground burials in copings Undergoing restoration by Archdiocese of New Orleans |
| St. Vincent de Paul Cemeteries Nos. 1,2,3 | 1844 | Roman Catholic | Extant | Exact year of opening uncertain Contains some inappropriate historical restorations |
| Dispersed of Judah Cemetery | 1846 | Jewish | Extant | Land donated by Judah P. Touro; Special section for suicide victims |
| Odd Fellows Rest Cemetery | 1847 | Benevolent associations | Extant | Not open to the public |
| Charity Hospital Cemetery | 1848 | Potter's field | Extant | Closed to new burials Contains memorial to victims of Hurricane Katrina |
| St. Bartholomew Cemetery | 1848 | Roman Catholic | Extant | West bank of New Orleans |
| Carrollton Cemetery | 1849 | Suburban | Extant | Many in-ground burials City of New Orleans Cemetery Department |
| Greenwood Cemetery | 1852 | Historic rural | Extant | Many benevolent associations have monuments there |
| St. Louis Cemetery No. 3 | 1854 | Roman Catholic | Extant | Elaborate crypts Greek Orthodox section |
| St. Joseph Cemetery No. 1 | 1854 | Roman Catholic | Extant | Sisters of Notre Dame for German immigrants Has a functioning chapel |
| Lafayette Cemetery No. 2 | 1858 | Benevolent associations | Extant | Most society tombs are abandoned Significant disrepair |
| Locust Grove Cemetery No. 1 | 1859 | Potter's field | Defunct | Locust Grove Cemetery No. 2 built nearby in 1877; Both closed in 1879 and subsequently demolished |
| Hebrew Rest Cemetery No. 1 | 1860 | Jewish | Extant | On the high ground of the Gentilly Ridge for above ground burial |
| St. Mary Cemetery | 1861 | originally Roman Catholic | Extant | West bank of New Orleans; Acquired by the city of New Orleans in 1921, now non-denominational |
| Chalmette National Cemetery | 1864 | Military | Extant | Originally for Union soldiers that died in the US Civil War; In-ground burials with gravestones |
| Gates of Prayer | 1864 | Jewish | Extant | Name changed from Temmeme Derech Cemetery in 1939 |
| Freedman's Cemetery | 1867 | African-American | Defunct | Many deceased re-interred from the Chalmette National Battlefield; Historical marker commemorates the location |
| Masonic Temple Cemetery | 1868 | Fraternal | Extant | Originally by Freemasons; Burials not restricted to Freemasons |
| Metairie Cemetery | 1872 | Historic rural | Extant | Many contemporary notable and celebrity burials |
| St. Joseph Cemetery No. 2 | 1873 | Roman Catholic | Extant | Sisters of Notre Dame for German immigrants Has a functioning chapel |
| St. Roch Cemeteries Nos. 1 & 2 | 1874 | Roman Catholic | Extant | Originally for German immigrants Many victims of yellow fever epidemics |
| Holt Cemetery | 1879 | Potter's field | Extant | Below ground burials Unofficial burial ground before 1879 |
| Hebrew Rest Cemetery No. 2 | 1894 | Jewish | Extant | Expansion of Hebrew Rest Cemetery No. 1 |
| Ahavas Sholem Cemetery | 1897 | Jewish | Extant | Benevolent society by the same name For Eastern European Orthodox Jewish Immigrants |
| Mount Olivet Cemetery | 1918 | African-American | Extant | Above ground tombs and copings |
| Woodlawn Memorial Park Cemetery | 1939 | Historic rural | Extant | Above ground tombs with newer above ground tombs |
| Hurricane Katrina Memorial | 2008 | Mausoleum | Extant | Houses remains of unknown victims of Hurricane Katrina |

== Gallery ==
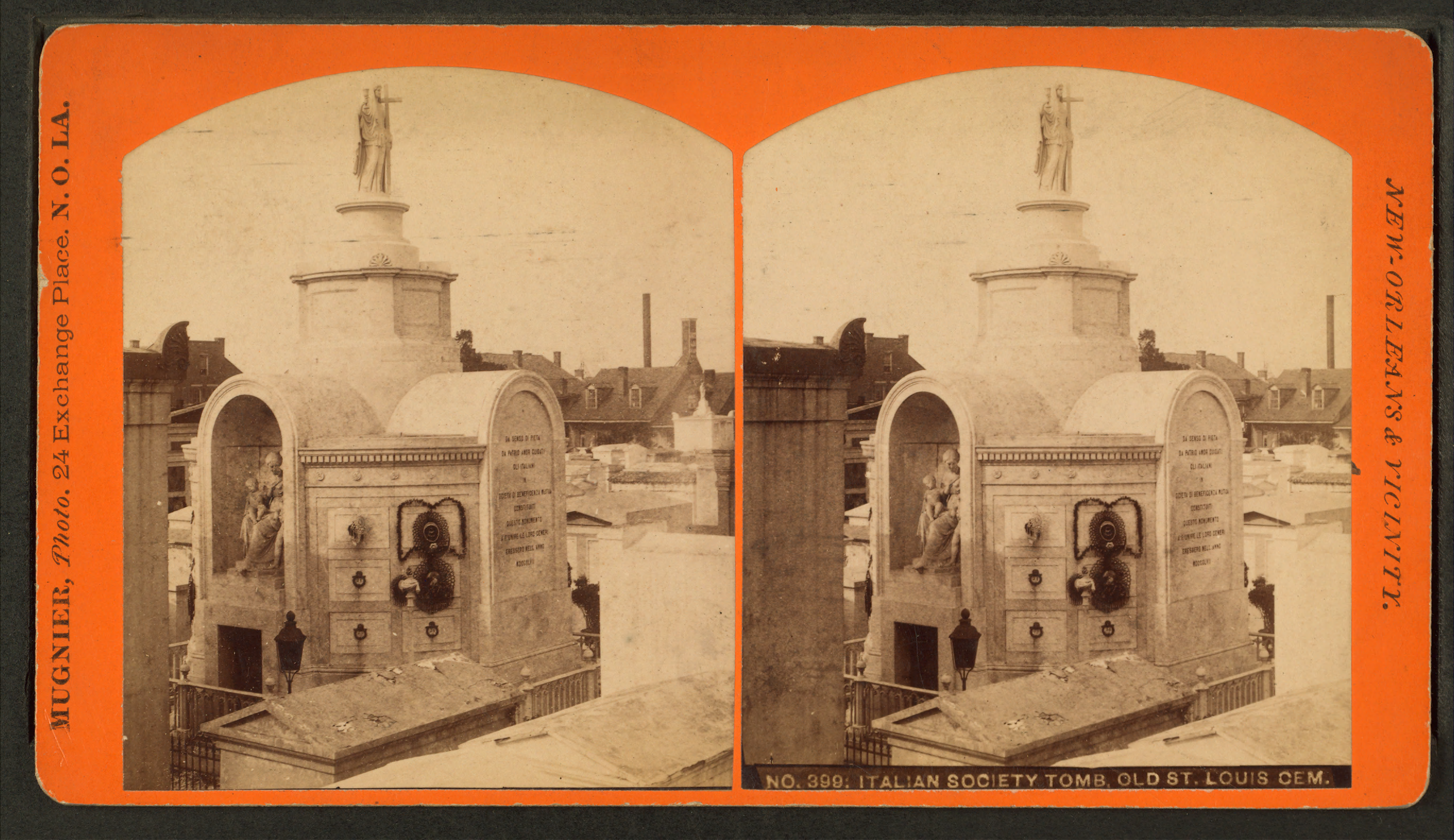
Stereoview of the Italian society tomb in St. Louis Cemetery No. 1, photo by George F. Mugnier

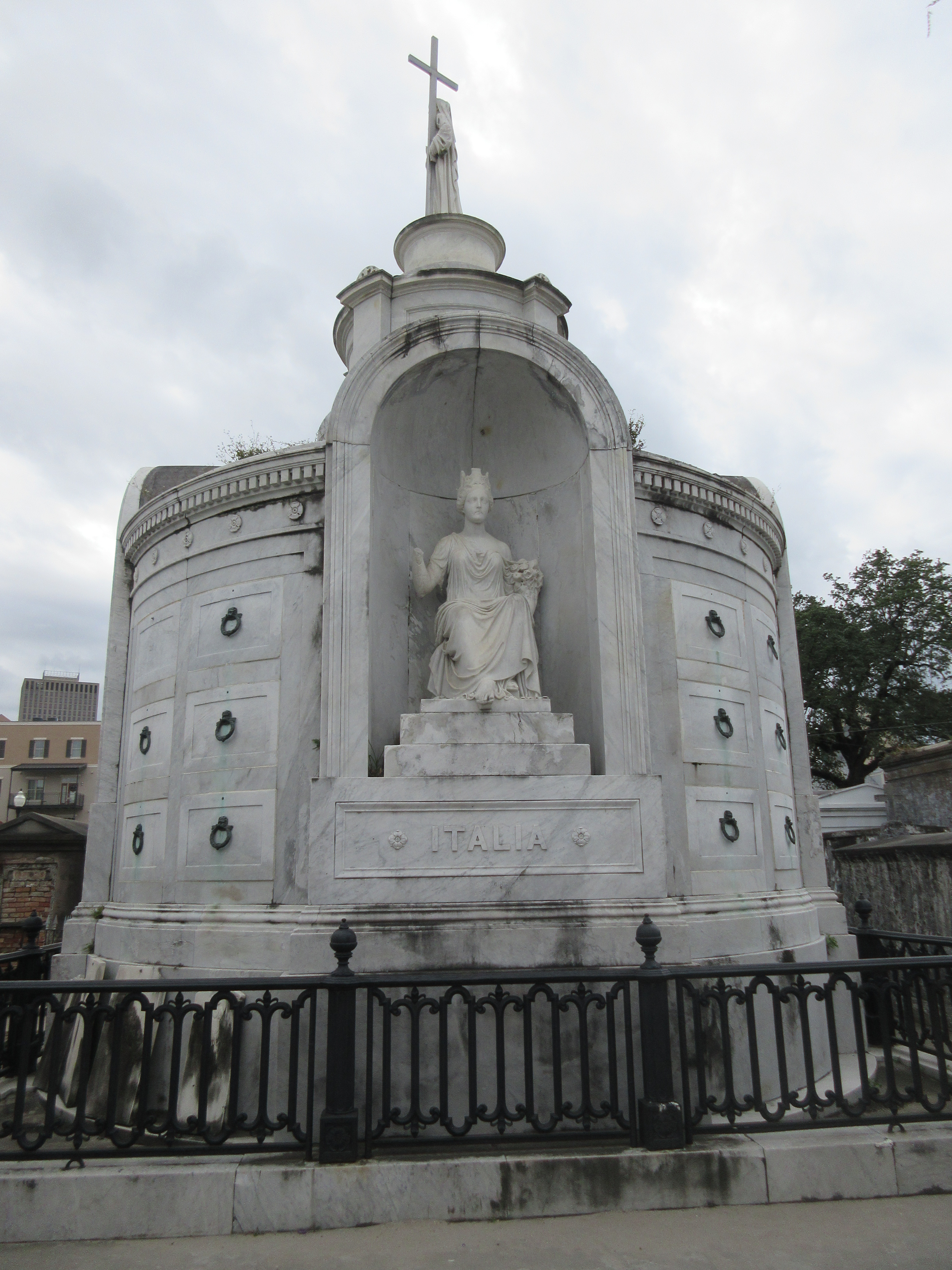
Above-ground tomb of the Italian Mutual Benevolent Society at St. Louis Cemetery No. 1 (photo courtesy of Infrogmation)

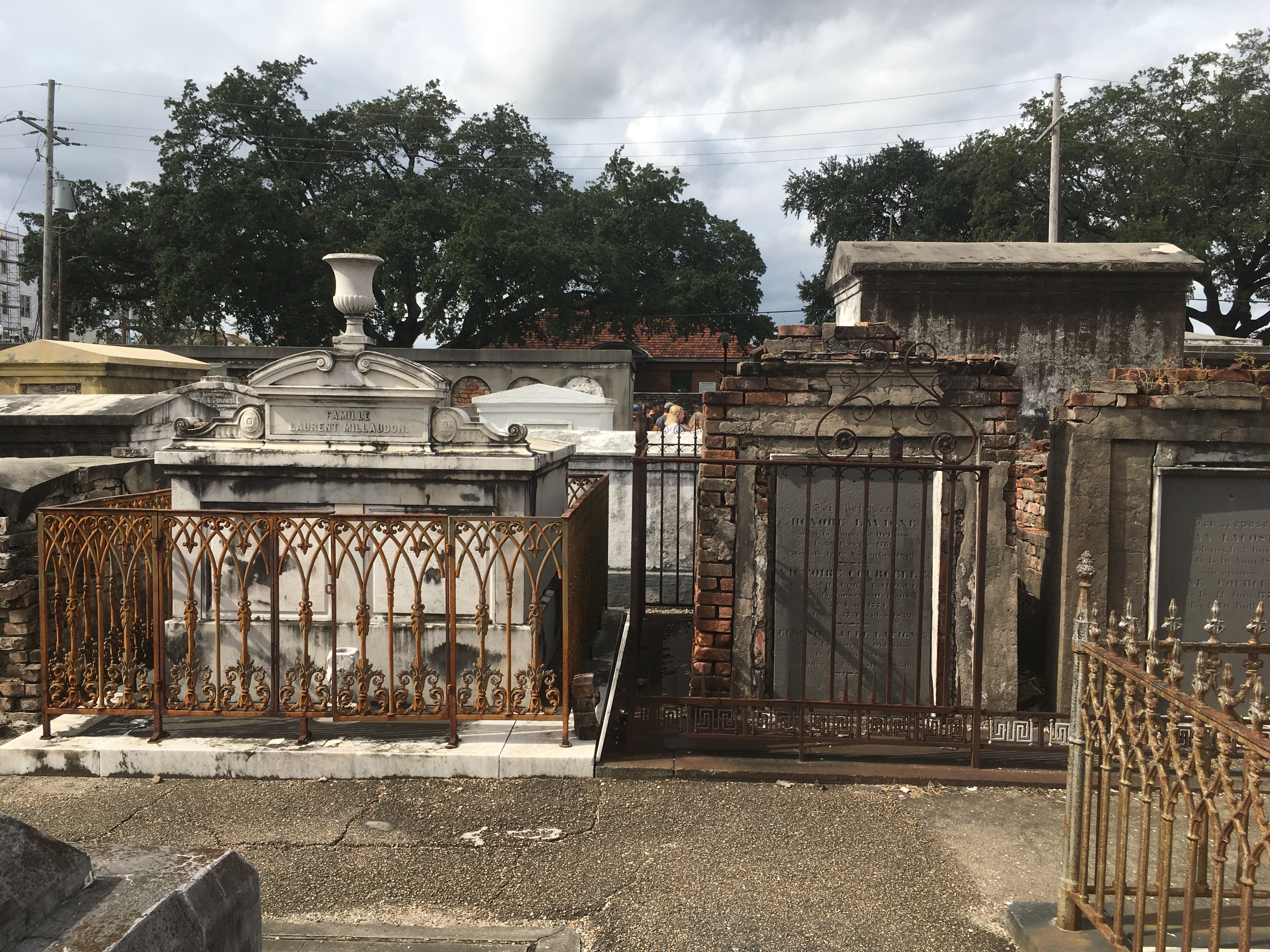
St. Louis Cemetery No. 1, many 19th century tombs have wrought iron fences

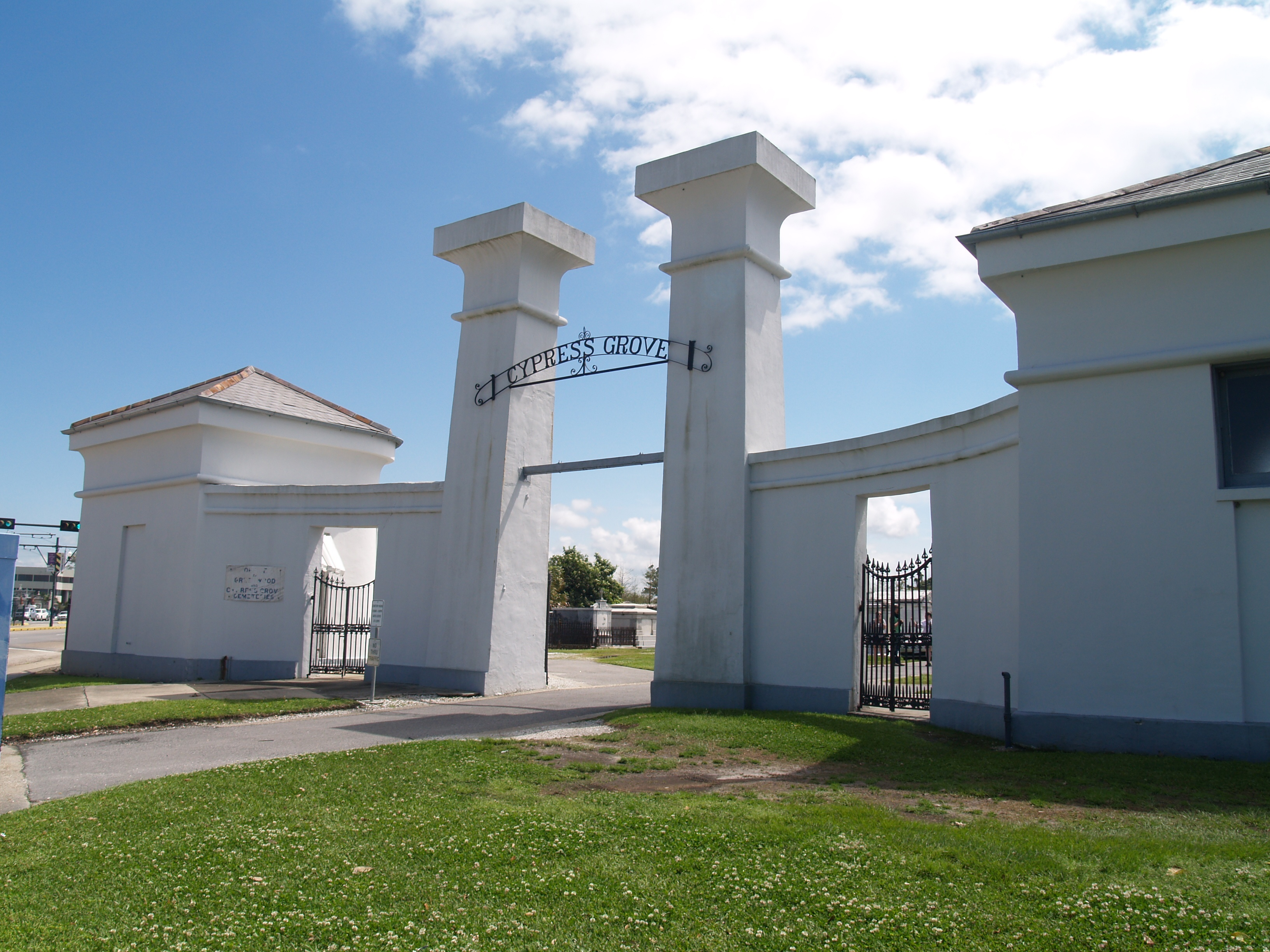
Entrance to the Cypress Grove Cemetery, with gates said to be suggestive of triumphal passage from one world to the next

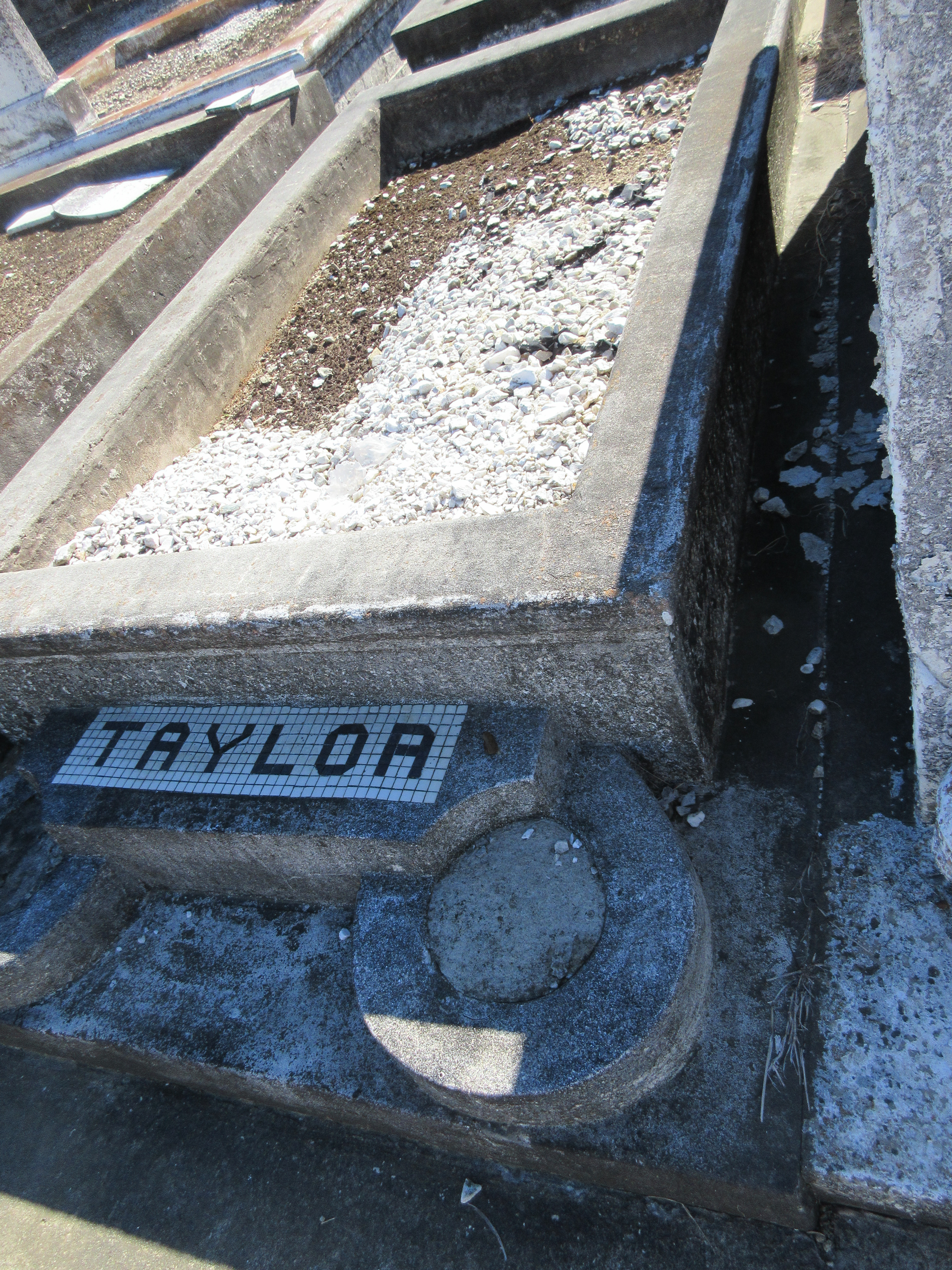
Tile lettering common at Mount Olivet Cemetery, New Orleans

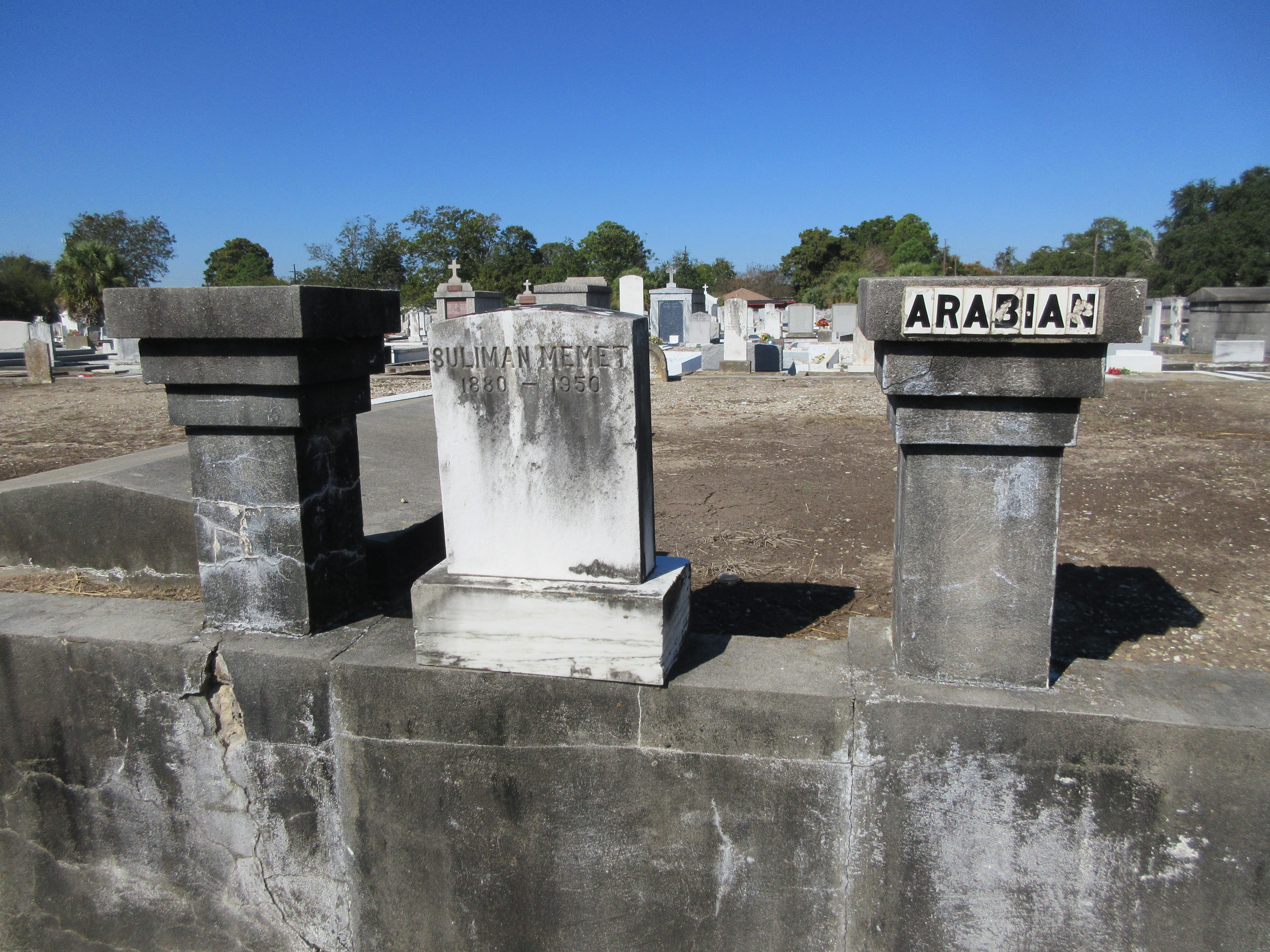
Arabian tomb at Mount Olivet Cemetery (photo courtesy of Infrogmation)

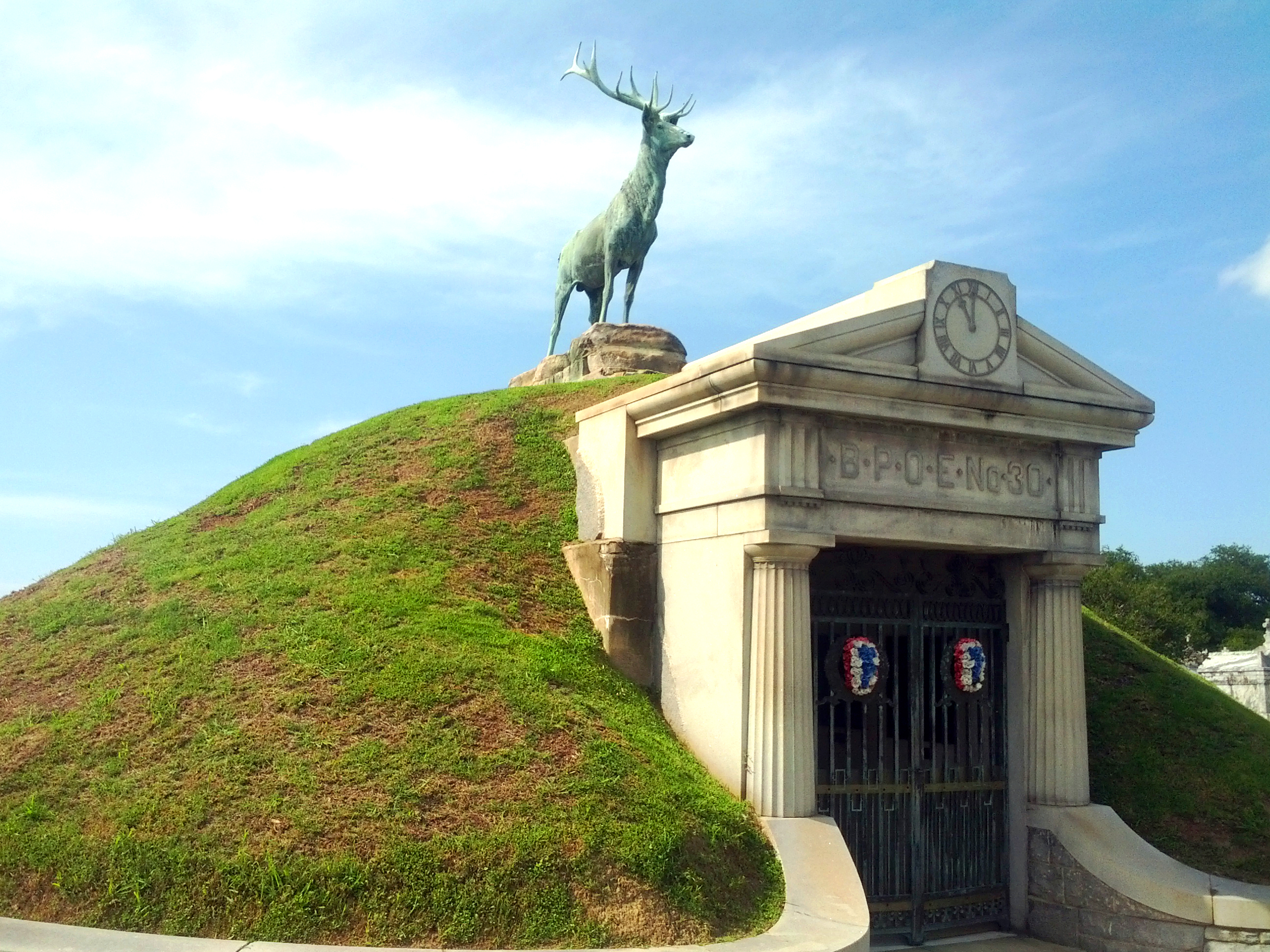
Benevolent Protective Order of Elks, a benevolent association tomb at Greenwood Cemetery, New Orleans

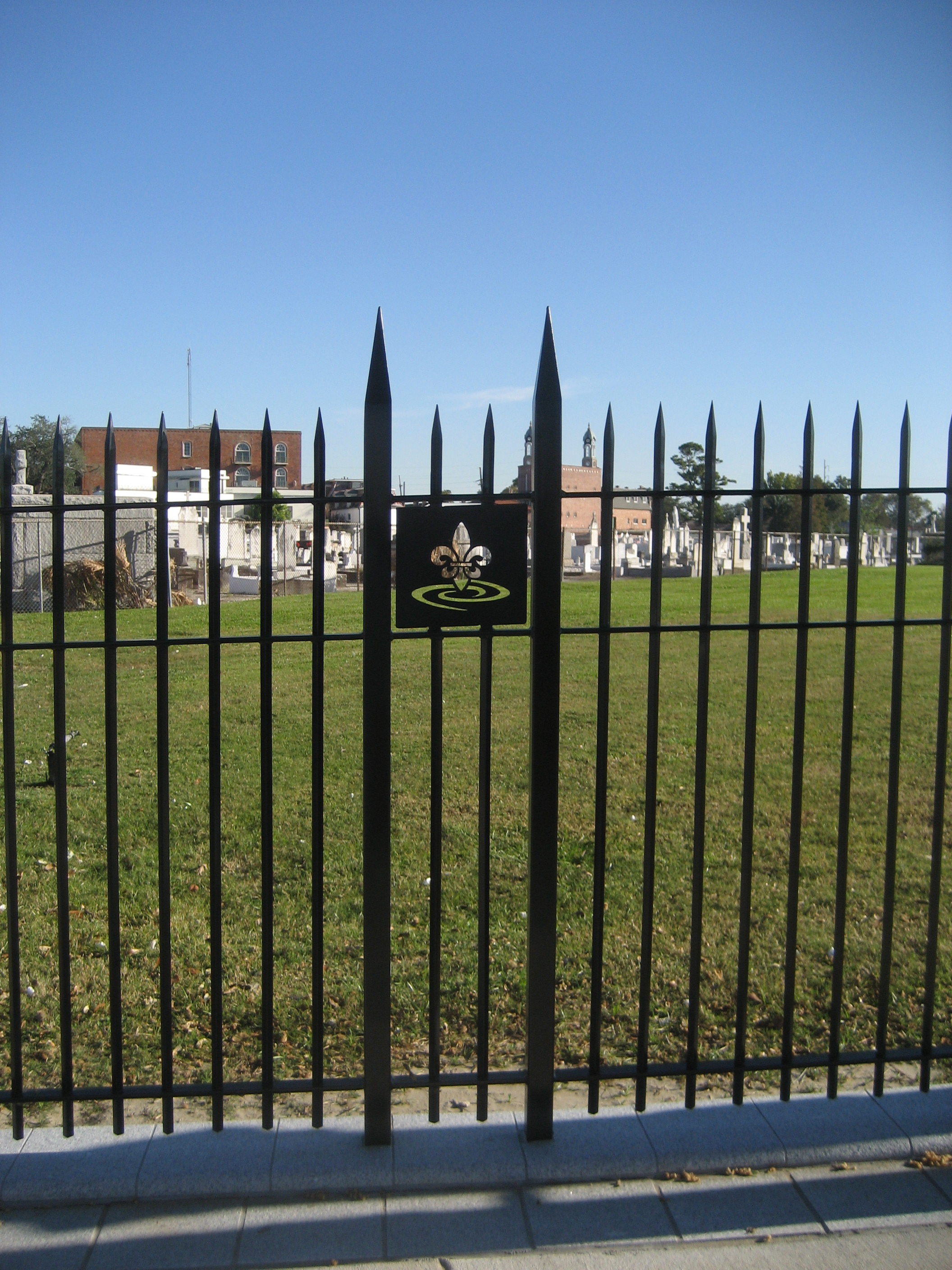
Entrance to the Charity Hospital Cemetery, a potters' field (photo courtesy of Infrogmation)

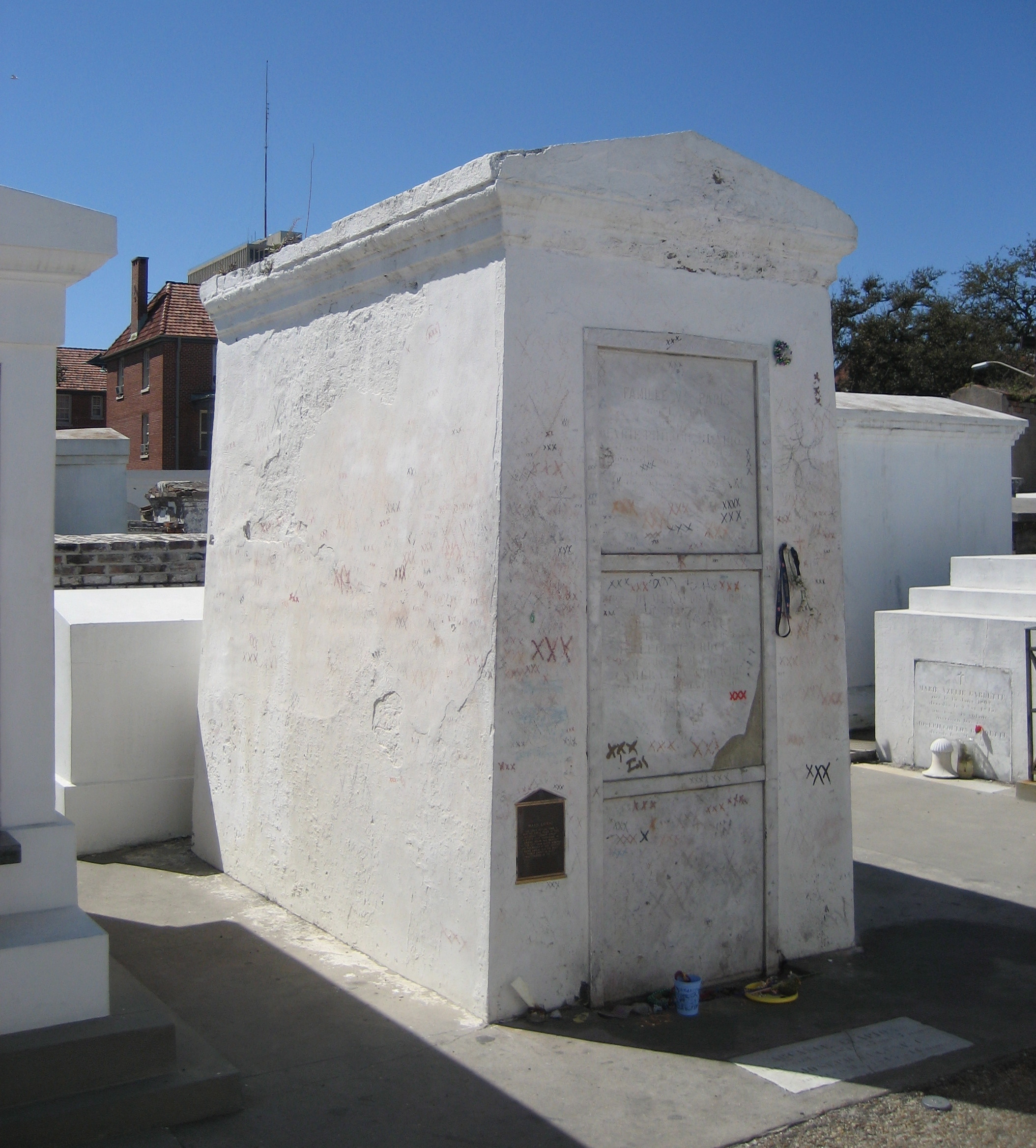
Tomb of voodoo queen Marie Laveau at St. Louis Cemetery No. 1 (photo courtesy of Infrogmation)

== See also ==
- Tombstone tourist
- Jazz funeral
- Buildings and architecture of New Orleans
- List of cemeteries in Louisiana
