= Grave visiting =

Grave visiting or visiting of graves may mean:-

- Pilgrimage – in religious contexts
- Tombstone tourist – usually a secular activity
- Tomb sweeping or grave tending in various cultures
- Ziarah – in Islam – noting it is visitation – not pilgrimage

== See also ==
- All Souls' Day
- Festival of the Dead
- Veneration of the dead
