= Find a Grave =

Online database of cemetery records

- Website type: Online database
- Available in: English; French; German; Spanish; Italian; Dutch; Portuguese; Swedish; Japanese; Danish; Finnish; Norwegian; Polish
- Headquarters: Lehi, Utah, U.S.
- Owner: Ancestry.com (2013–present)
- Founder: Jim Tipton
- Website: www.findagrave.com
- Commercial: Yes
- Registration: Optional
- Launched: 1998; 28 years ago
- Current status: Active

Find a Grave is a collaborative online database of human and pet cemetery records, owned by Ancestry.com. As of 2026, the site claimed more than 265 million memorials.

== History ==
The logo of Find a Grave used from 2000 to 2018

Find a Grave was created in 1995 by Jim Tipton of Salt Lake City, Utah, to support his hobby of visiting the burial sites of famous celebrities. Tipton described his early childhood as a nerdy kid with a fascination for graves, and an interest in HTML. He later added an online forum. Find a Grave was launched as a commercial entity in 1998, first as a trade name and then incorporated in 2000.

In 2010, Find a Grave was expanded to include graves of non-celebrities in order to allow online visitors to pay respect to their deceased relatives or friends.

In 2013, Tipton sold Find a Grave to Ancestry.com.

== Content and features ==
The website contains listings of cemeteries and graves from around the world. American cemeteries are organized by state and county, and many cemetery records contain Google Maps (with GPS coordinates supplied by contributors) and photographs of the cemeteries and gravesites. Individual grave records may contain dates and places of birth and death, biographical information, cemetery and plot information, photographs (of the grave marker, the individual, etc.), and contributor information.

Interment listings are added by individuals, genealogical societies, cemetery associations, and other institutions such as the International Wargraves Photography Project.

The website is often recommended as a resource for genealogy research.

Find a Grave also maintains lists of memorials of famous persons by their "claim to fame", such as Medal of Honor recipients, religious figures, and educators. Find a Grave exercises editorial control over these listings.

Starting from May 18, 2023, memorials became able to be marked with a "Veteran" tag.

== Policies ==
Website policy is to remove memorials or transfer their management at the request of an immediate family member. In January 2022, following complaints, Find a Grave announced a new policy for memorials of recently deceased persons. Under the new policy, any photos or personal information, including obituaries, are hidden for three months.

== See also ==
- Canadian Headstones
- Interment.net
- Random Acts of Genealogical Kindness
- Tombstone tourist
- United States National Cemetery System's nationwide gravesite locator
