= Interment.net =

Online cemetery database

Interment.net is a United States–based website containing a free online database of transcriptions from headstones. Its cemetery database to date includes more than 6 million cemetery records from around the world.

The database is limited to information transcribed from grave markers at cemeteries and/or obtained from burial records from cemetery offices. The data includes surname, given name, birthdate, birthplace, death date, death place, age, inscription (including symbols), notes, and sometimes the location of the grave marker. The coverage of data addresses the problem for scholars and genealogists who cite the way cemetery records tend to be incomplete while some transcripts are inaccurate.

== History ==
The site started in March 1997 as a personal web page called Cemetery Interment Lists on the Internet and was simply a list of links to websites with cemetery records. In 1998, the site started accepting cemetery transcriptions directly; to stop the personal website from being overwhelmed, the page author registered the domain name "interment.net" in December 1998 and moved to a separate web hosting service. By June 1999, the focus of the site had changed to hosting cemetery transcriptions, and the title was changed to Cemetery Records on the Internet, then later, Cemetery Records Online.

The site has had at least seven-page layouts since 1997. It has been supported by advertising revenue since July 1999, and in 2005, the personal site owner incorporated Clear Digital Media, Inc. to control the site. The company has since expanded, starting several other websites and weblogs. Interment.net is a volunteer website and is staffed by contributors and volunteers who go to cemeteries to take photographs for its digital repository and for transcription. Volunteers for these websites describe their labor as a "genealogical kindness," of particular service to those researching their ancestry.

== See also ==
- Canadian Headstones
- Find a Grave – an online database of cemetery records
- National Cemetery Administration's Nationwide Gravesite Locator
- Random Acts of Genealogical Kindness – volunteers photograph graves on request
- Tombstone tourist
