= Canadian Headstones =

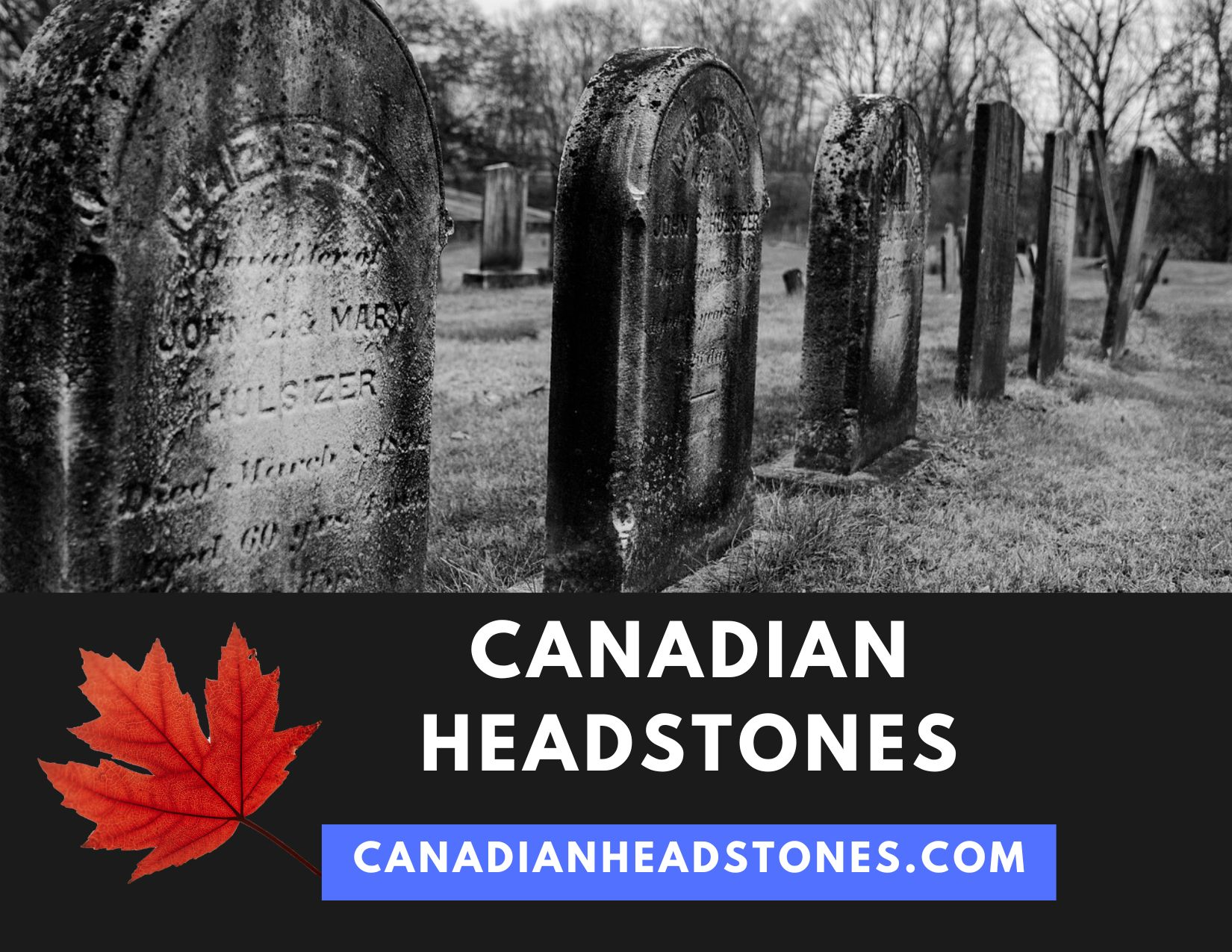
- Founded: 1 July 2009
- Founder: Jim McKane
- Type: Registered Charity
- Location: Concord, Ontario, Canada
- President: Steve Fulton, UE
- Board of directors: David Thompson Cliff Seibel Joe Wilson
- Website: canadianheadstones.com

Canadian Headstones is a project to capture digital images and the complete transcription of cemetery stones. It is a web-based Canadian non-profit corporation run completely by volunteers.

== History ==
Jim McKane began his genealogical quest in the early 1970s, when his father convinced him to become the custodian of the pedigree for his Lyons Clan Reunion in Chinguacousy Township, Peel County, Ontario. In April 2009, while volunteering as assistant webmaster of a website, he found a website archiving headstones for those who were born in County Tyrone, Northern Ireland, the home of his ancestors.

Realizing the value of the information to genealogists and family historians, he set out to research the possibility of creating an archive for Canadian headstones. While there were a number of websites storing photos of gravestones, none also included the inscriptions on the gravestones. The majority of existing sites also had either no search engine feature or very poorly constructed search features. The result was the creation on 1 July 2009 of CanadianHeadstones.com.

The bylaws of Canadian Headstones state that the purpose of the corporation is: the corporation shall gather, archive, publish and disseminate genealogical, historical data or other records of interest to family historians, genealogists or other researchers.

== Use ==
Canadian Headstones relies on volunteers, including genealogy enthusiasts, to upload photos. The site steps a contributor through uploading a photo, editing it, choosing a county and cemetery, entering the names and inscription. It is then checked by a coordinator who assists the contributor to fix any problems.

The site also uses a soundex system to allow searches for sound-alike names, to account for spelling variations, typos in entries or degraded quality of older headstones.

The section of the site devoted to Quebec is available in both French and English.

== Records ==
By 2012, CanadianHeadstones.com had 348,000 records submitted to the site and was growing at a rate of 10,000 entries per month. By 2015, the site had more than 1 million records.

The website includes a subproject to photograph gravestones of Canadian soldiers buried in cemeteries abroad, with more than 1,000 graves photographed by January 2015. The site also documented Halifax Memorial at Nova Scotia's Point Pleasant Park, devoted to the Canadian sailors who died during World Wars I and II, with close-up photos of all the panels with the names of the soldiers.

== See also ==
- Find a Grave – an online database of cemetery records
- Interment.net
- Random Acts of Genealogical Kindness
- Tombstone tourist
