= Odd Fellows Rest Cemetery =

Historic cemetery in New Orleans, Louisiana

- U.S. National Register of Historic Places
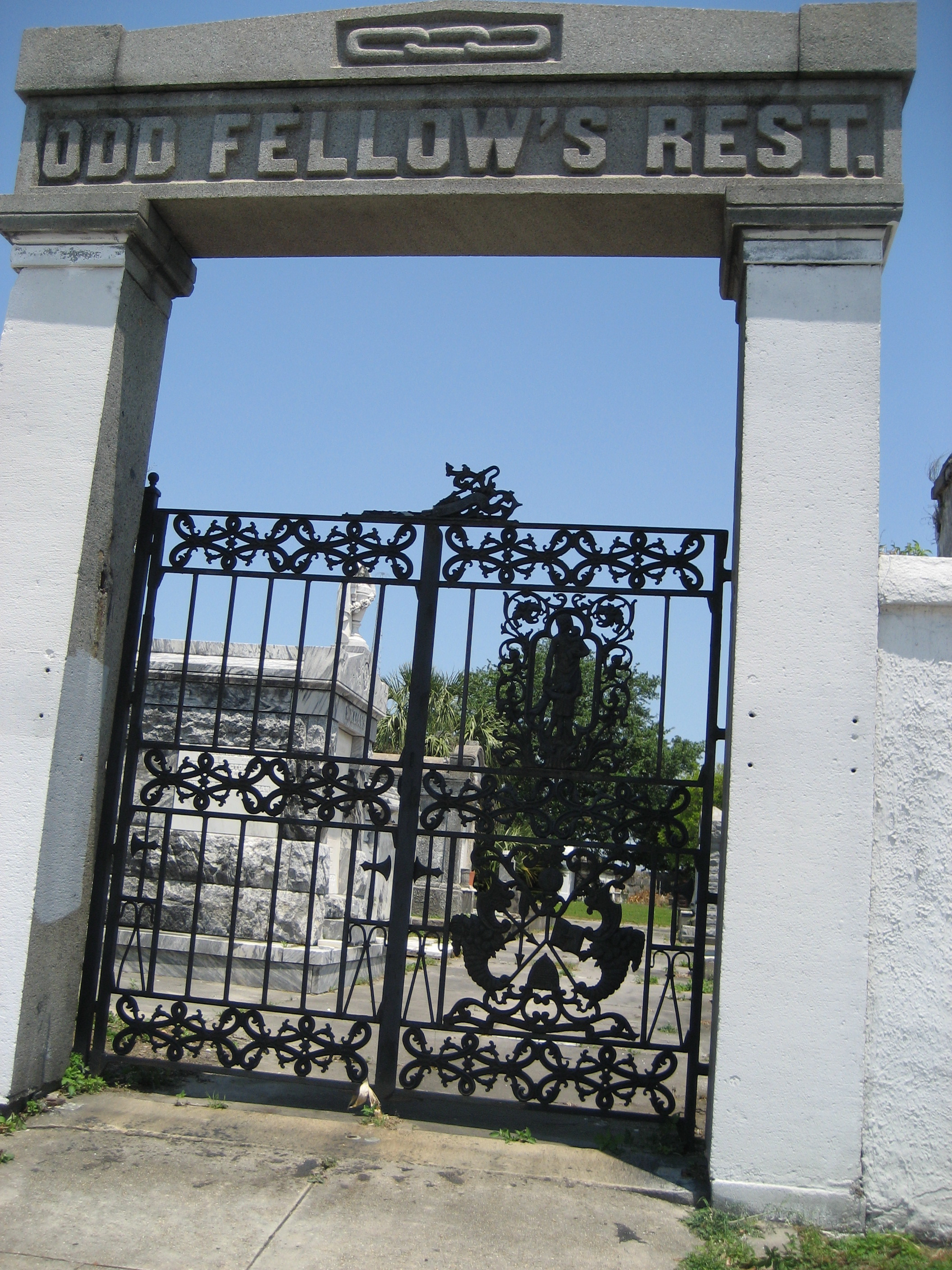
- Odd Fellows Rest Gate

- Location within East New Orleans Location within Louisiana Location within the United States
- Location: Canal Street & City Park Avenue, New Orleans, Louisiana
- Coordinates: 29°58′54″N 90°06′38″W
- Area: 1.5 acres (0.61 ha)
- Built: 1849
- Architectural style: Renaissance, Exotic Revival
- NRHP reference No.: 80001745
- Added to NRHP: May 23, 1980

The Odd Fellows Rest Cemetery is located in New Orleans, Louisiana. Opened in 1849, Odd Fellow Rest Cemetery is one of a group of historic cemeteries in New Orleans. The cemetery features Renaissance architecture and Exotic Revival architecture. It was listed on the National Register of Historic Places in May 1980. Odd Fellows Rest Cemetery is not open to the public.

== History ==
Odd Fellows Rest Cemetery is the oldest Fraternal Cemetery in New Orleans. Land for the Odd Fellows Rest Cemetery was purchased for $700 in 1847 by the members of the Grand Lodge of the Independent Order of Odd Fellows. The cemetery was officially opened in 1849 as a burial place for members of the Odd Fellows and their families. The first interments in the cemetery took place at the opening ceremony in 1849, where the remains of 16 members of the Odd Fellows were disinterred from other cemeteries and reinterred at Odd Fellows. Due to the 1853 Yellow Fever Pandemic burials were opened to persons outside the Order of the Odd Fellows.

As of 2025, the cemetery remains under the care of the Odd Fellows Grand Lodge of Louisiana and is looked after by members of New Orleans' Odd Fellows lodge, Crescent City #73. It is the subject of ongoing professional repair and renovation, closed to the public to prevent vandalism, but open to guided tours. The Herb Import Company leases the building on the premises from the Odd Fellows.

== See also ==
- Independent Order of Odd Fellows
- National Register of Historic Places listings in Orleans Parish, Louisiana
