= Tombstone tourist =

Person who visits grave sites

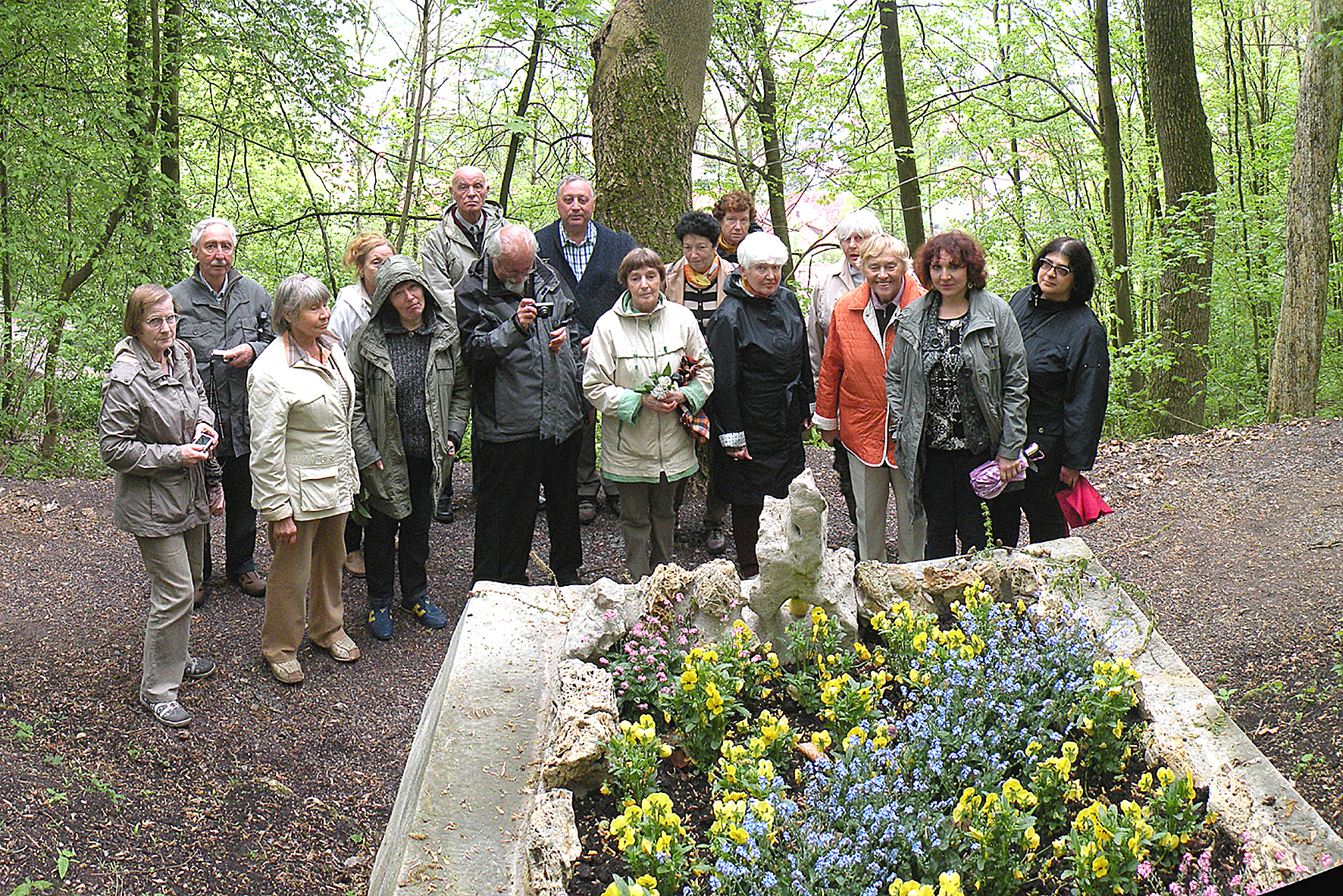
A group of tourists visiting the Dunkelgrafen

A tombstone tourist (otherwise known as a "cemetery enthusiast", "cemetery tourist", "grave hunter", "graver", or "taphophile") is an individual with a passion for cemeteries, epitaphs, gravestone rubbing, photography, art, and history of (famous) deaths. The term has been most notably used by author and biographer Scott Stanton as the title of his former website and book The Tombstone Tourist: Musicians (2003), about the lives and gravesites of famous musicians.

Some cemetery tourists are particularly interested in the historical aspects of cemeteries or the historical relevance of their inhabitants. La Recoleta Cemetery in Buenos Aires, Old Jewish Cemetery in Prague and Zentralfriedhof (Central Cemetery) in Vienna, Austria, carry a large array of famous inhabitants and their tombs, that make the cemeteries significant tourist destinations. The historic cemeteries of New Orleans are tourist destinations because of their relevance to the cultural history of the city.

Genealogy tourists make considerable effort to search out cemeteries and their records, to verify grave records and ancestral burial locations.

== History ==
For centuries, people have made pilgrimages to the burial sites of religious icons and leaders. In fact, such was common during medieval times when people went to gravesites or to shrines to venerate saints. In China, the ancient tradition of ancestor worship also involved a veneration of dead relatives with visitations to shrines and gravesites.

During the 19th century, garden cemeteries began to appear that encouraged visitors to stay and visit in the cemetery. Famous among these is the Père Lachaise cemetery in Paris, France, which continues to invite tourists to visit and see elaborate memorials not only to the world famous, but to lesser known individuals as well.

Cemetery records have also been a way of verifying genealogical data. Making gravestone rubbings was in practice for centuries as a way of providing this documentation and appreciating the carvings on the tombstones. Among genealogists, scouring cemeteries looking for the graves of dead ancestors is a common and longstanding practice with individuals often relying on limited and outdated information to find burial sites.

== Today ==
The hunting of graves has become digital as many cemetery transcribers and ancestor hunters have begun using GPS equipment to locate the area where a graveyard or gravesite is reputed to be.

In Russian and Ukrainian it is called "Necropolistics" (некрополистика, некрополістика), from the Greek word necropolis (cemetery) and is considered an auxiliary science of history.

== See also ==
- Canadian Headstones
- Find a Grave
- Interment.net
- National Cemetery Administration's Nationwide Gravesite Locator
- Random Acts of Genealogical Kindness
