= Lafayette Cemetery No. 1 =

Cemetery in New Orleans, Louisiana, US

- U.S. National Register of Historic Places
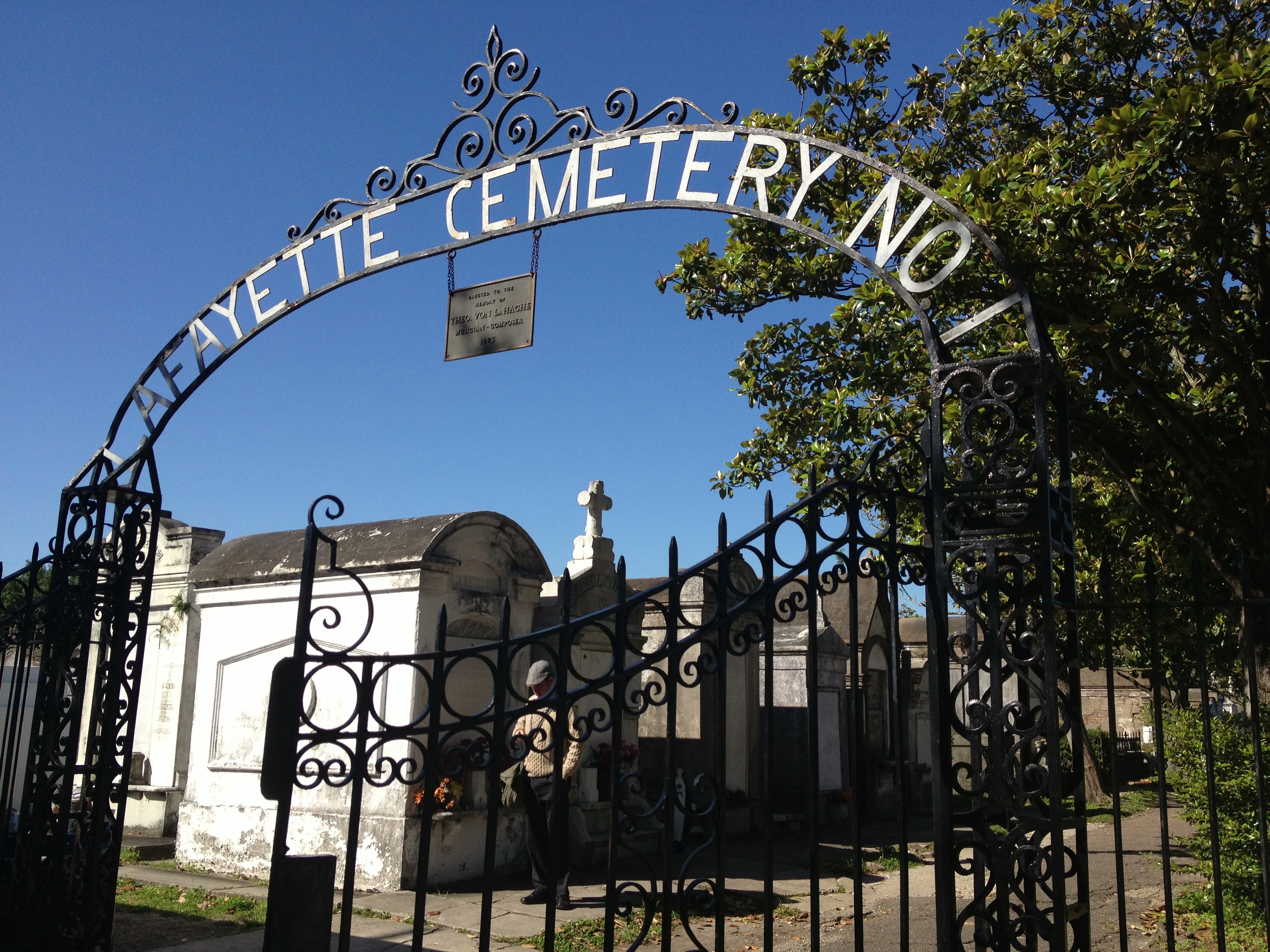
- Entrance gate to the cemetery.

- Location within East New Orleans Location within Louisiana Location within the United States
- Coordinates: 29.928701°N 90.085361°W
- Built: 1833
- Architect: Benjamin Buisson
- Architectural style: Neo-Classical
- NRHP reference No.: 72000559
- Added to NRHP: 1972

Lafayette Cemetery No. 1 is a historic cemetery in the Garden District neighborhood of New Orleans, Louisiana. Founded in 1833 and still in use today, the cemetery takes its name from its location in what was once the City of Lafayette, a suburb of New Orleans that was annexed by the larger metropolis in 1852. The city's first planned cemetery, it is notable for the architectural significance of its tombs and mausoleums, often containing multiple family members, and for its layout, a cruciform plan that allowed for funeral processions.

Confined within a single city block, the cemetery contains approximately 1,100 family tombs and 7,000 people.

== Conservation ==
The Cemetery was included in the National Register of Historic Places on February 1, 1972, for its architectural and social-historical importance.

The World Monuments Fund placed Lafayette Cemetery No. 1 on its "Watch" list in 1996 due to the dilapidated state of some tombs, and it did so again in 2006 after Hurricane Katrina damaged much of the cemetery. The Fund subsequently partnered with Save Our Cemeteries, a nonprofit focused on preserving Louisiana's historic cemeteries, and the Preservation Trades Network to repair tombs and restore the cemetery's landscape. Save Our Cemeteries continues to advocate for the cemeteries and make repairs. The City of New Orleans closed the cemetery in September of 2019 to visitors. There is no date available for when it will reopen.

== Notable tombs ==
- John Howard Ferguson, defendant in the 1896 Plessy v. Ferguson court case that upheld the constitutionality of racial segregation laws for public facilities.
- Harry T. Hays, an American Army officer serving in the Mexican–American War and a general who served in the Confederate Army during the American Civil War; leader of a brigade known as the "Louisiana Tigers."

== In popular culture ==
=== Literature ===
While promoting her 1995 novel Memnoch the Devil, writer Anne Rice emerged from a coffin after riding through the cemetery. At the time, she lived in the nearby Garden District.

=== Films and TV series ===
Films and TV series shot in the cemetery include:

- Hard Target (1993)
- Interview with the Vampire (1994)
- Double Jeopardy (1999)
- Dracula 2000 (2000)
- Deja Vu (2006)
- The Vampire Diaries (2009–2017)
- Jonah Hex (2010)
- The Originals (2013–2018)
- Black and Blue (2019)

=== Other ===
Music videos by the following artists have been shot in the cemetery:

- LeAnn Rimes
- New Kids on the Block

== See also ==
- Lafayette Cemetery No. 2
- Inventory and Cross-Index to Plaques and Tombs of Historic New Orleans Cemetery Lafayette #1
- Historic Cemeteries of New Orleans
