= Audubon College =

Location
- New Orleans; United States

Information
- Established: 1853

Audubon College was a school in New Orleans founded by Simon Rouen in 1853. He moved from France to New Orleans from in 1809. He was a tutor and principal before starting the school. Audubon College was located at Burgundy and Dumaine streets in the city's French Quarter. Rouen's father-in-law was architect J.N.B. de Pouilly, who taught classes at the school.
