= Lafayette Cemetery No. 2 =

Cemetery in New Orleans, Louisiana, US

Coordinates: 29.935°N 90.090°W

Details
- Established: 1858
- Closed: ~1997
- Location: New Orleans, Louisiana
- Country: United States
- Type: Municipal
- Style: Above-ground
- Owned by: City of New Orleans Division of Cemeteries
- Size: 2.5 acres (1.0 ha)
- No. of graves: ~1,100 (7,000 internments)

Lafayette Cemetery No. 2 is a roughly 2.5-acre municipal, above-ground garden-style cemetery located at 2100 Washington Avenue in New Orleans, Louisiana. Established in 1858, it contains family tombs, coping burials, and large vaults built by benevolent societies, particularly African American labor and mutual-aid groups. It is owned and operated by the City of New Orleans Division of Cemeteries and has largely fallen into disrepair, although restoration projects are ongoing.

== Background ==
The cemetery was constructed to deal with the growing number of citizens in the City of Lafayette, a town which would become consumed by New Orleans. The cemetery contains a vast number of "oven vaults" which are common to the above ground burials located throughout the city. The site was constructed by a number of labor groups, primarily made up of African Americans, many of whom are interred within the cemetery. Many of the tombs are communal tombs still owned by citizen groups and societies for their members. Most tombs list the manner of death, which was common at the time, and many graves are carved with "apoplexy, accident, lightning strike, etc.".

== Notable burials ==
Harry T. Hays - Confederate Brigadier General, commander of the "Louisiana Tigers" brigade

Members of the Brunies Family - prominent local jazz family

Samuel Jarvis Peters - banker, city politician, created the municipality of Canal Street

== See also ==
- Lafayette Cemetery No. 1
