= Random Acts of Genealogical Kindness =

American genealogy research website

A typical tombstone photo as might be provided by a RAOGK member

Random Acts of Genealogical Kindness (RAOGK) is a web-based genealogical research co-op that functions solely by the services of volunteers. Volunteers from any part of the world may offer services to any requester, such as research of birth, marriage, and death records, public records, obituaries, and deeds. Some volunteers photograph burial sites, cemeteries and tombstones. Volunteers also offer "lookup" services in various history and genealogy books, such as those books owned by the volunteer or books held in libraries and historical societies.

The website was founded in 1999 by Bridgett and Doc Schneider, who saw the need for such a volunteer service in their local area. The small website grew very rapidly from being solely a statewide offering in the United States to an international global volunteer organization with some 4,300 volunteers around the world and a staff of about eight, also volunteering their time. In 2007, more than 71,000 requests were handled by the system, 10% of them to volunteers outside of the United States.

In October 2011, it was announced that the website would be taken down. Bridgett Schneider, the primary person behind RAOGK, died on November 12, 2011. Shortly before her death, she had a computer disaster. The site was down for three years. Schneider's husband, Doc, who helped start RAOGK, stated that RAOGK would come back online but the list of volunteers was unretrievable.

Meanwhile, an unofficial RAOGK website, RAOGK wiki, offered a workaround while the official RAOGK site was offline. In January 2015, it was announced that RAOGK was online again.

RAOGK has won many awards and has been featured in smaller local papers such as The Daily News, Jacksonville, North Carolina, The Morning Journal, Lorain, Ohio, and the St. Petersburg Times, Florida, – as well as AARP: The Magazine and The New York Times, for the unique service it offers to researchers. Family Tree Magazine named the site one of the "Best Big Genealogy Sites" in 2010.
