= List of cemeteries in Louisiana =

This list of cemeteries in Louisiana includes currently operating, historical (closed for new interments), and defunct (graves abandoned or removed) cemeteries, columbaria, and mausolea which are historical and/or notable. It does not include pet cemeteries.

== Acadia Parish ==
- Istre Cemetery Grave Houses, Morse

== Assumption Parish ==
- Christ Episcopal Church and Cemetery, Napoleonville

== Calcasieu Parish ==
Chloe Historic Cemetery

== Claiborne Parish ==
- Old Town Cemetery, near Haynesville

== East Baton Rouge Parish ==
- Baton Rouge National Cemetery, Baton Rouge; NRHP-listed
- Magnolia Cemetery, Baton Rouge; NRHP-listed
- Port Hudson National Cemetery, Port Hudson; NRHP-listed

== Jackson Parish ==
- Brooklyn Church and Cemetery, Chatham; NRHP-listed

== Natchitoches Parish ==
- St. Augustine Catholic Church and Cemetery (also known as Isle Brevelle Church), Natchez

== New Orleans ==
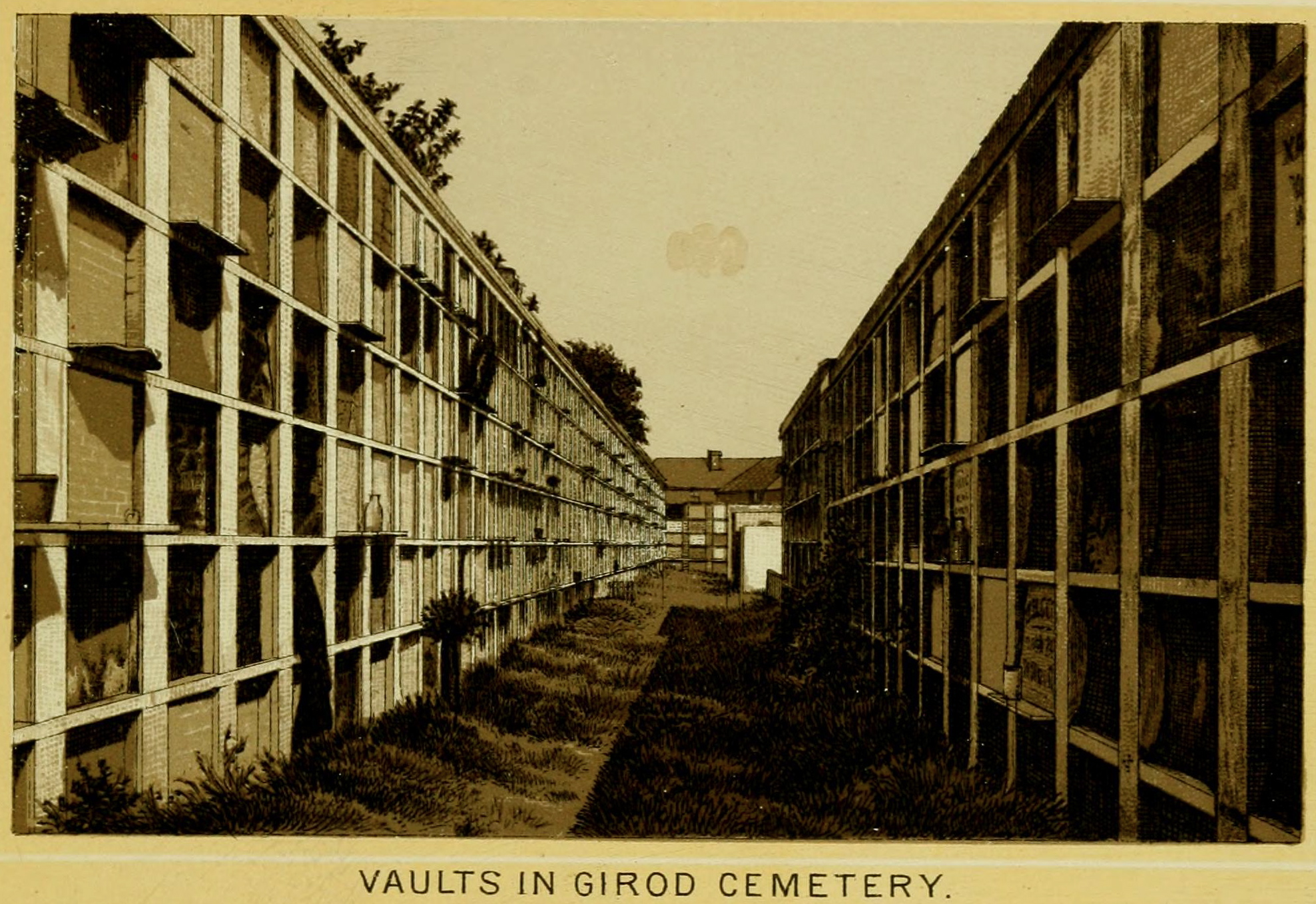
Girod Street Cemetery (1885) vaults, New Orleans

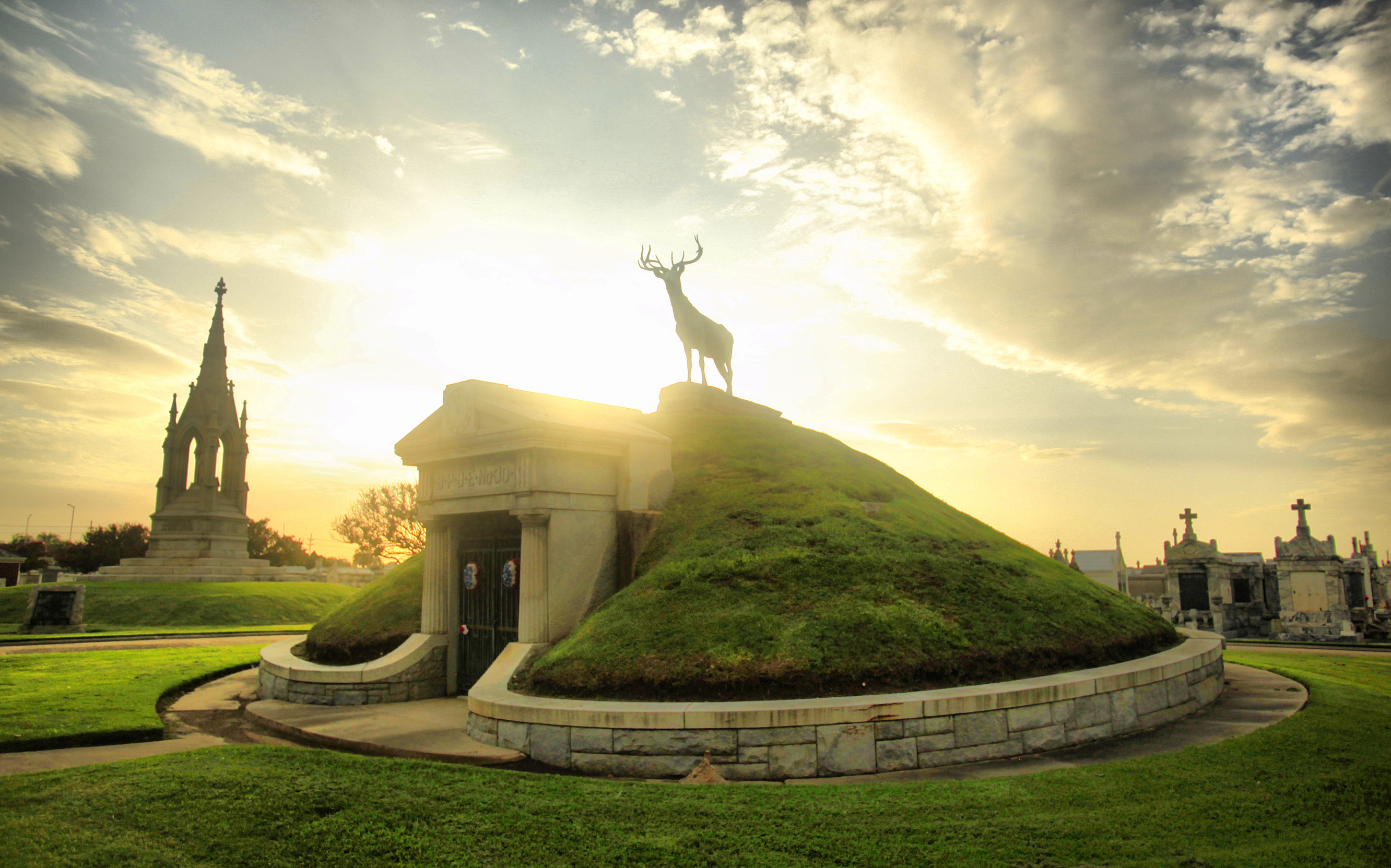
Greenwood Cemetery in New Orleans

- Faerie Playhouse Memorial Garden, New Orleans
- Girod Street Cemetery, New Orleans
- Greenwood Cemetery, New Orleans
- Holt Cemetery, New Orleans
- Lafayette Cemetery No. 1, New Orleans
- Metairie Cemetery, New Orleans; NRHP-listed
- Odd Fellows Rest Cemetery, New Orleans; NRHP-listed
- Saint Louis Cemetery, New Orleans; NRHP-listed
- Shrewsbury Cemetery (also known as Camp Parapet or First Zion Cemetery), New Orleans

== Rapides Parish ==
- Alexandria National Cemetery, Pineville; NRHP-listed
- Mt. Olivet Episcopal Church and Cemetery, Pineville
- Rapides Cemetery, Pineville; NRHP-listed

== Saint Bernard Parish ==
- Chalmette National Cemetery, Jean Lafitte National Historical Park and Preserve, Chalmette; NRHP-listed
- Freedmen's Cemetery, Chalmette (formerly part of New Orleans)

== Tangipahoa Parish ==
- Camp Moore Cemetery, Camp Moore, near Kentwood; NRHP-listed

== Vermilion Parish ==
- St. Mary Magdalen Church Cemetery, St. Mary Magdalen Church, Abbeville; NRHP-listed

== Webster Parish ==
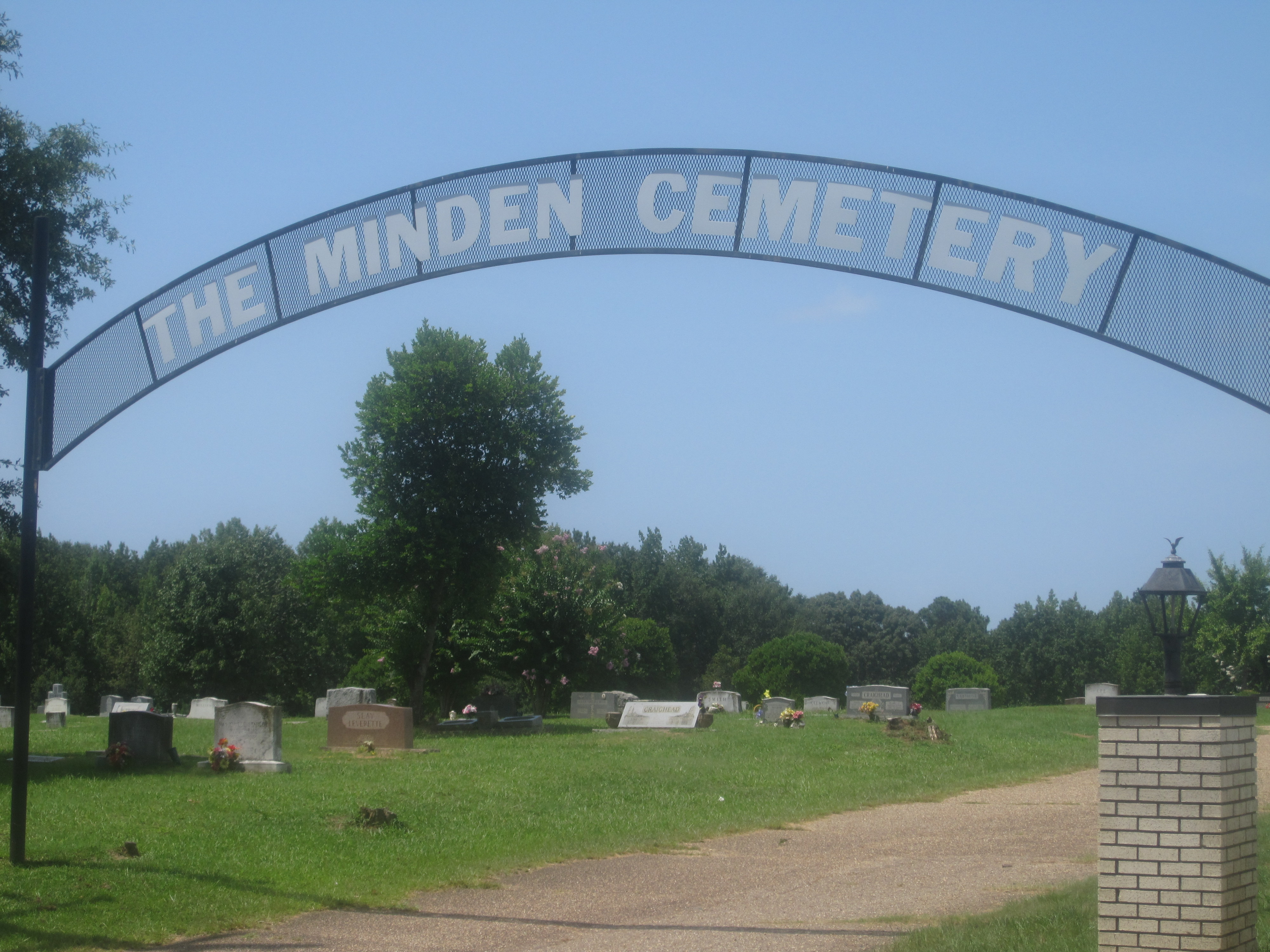
Minden Cemetery sign in Minden

- Minden Cemetery, Minden

== West Baton Rouge Parish ==
- Poplar Grove Plantation and cemetery, Port Allen; NRHP-listed

== West Feliciana Parish ==
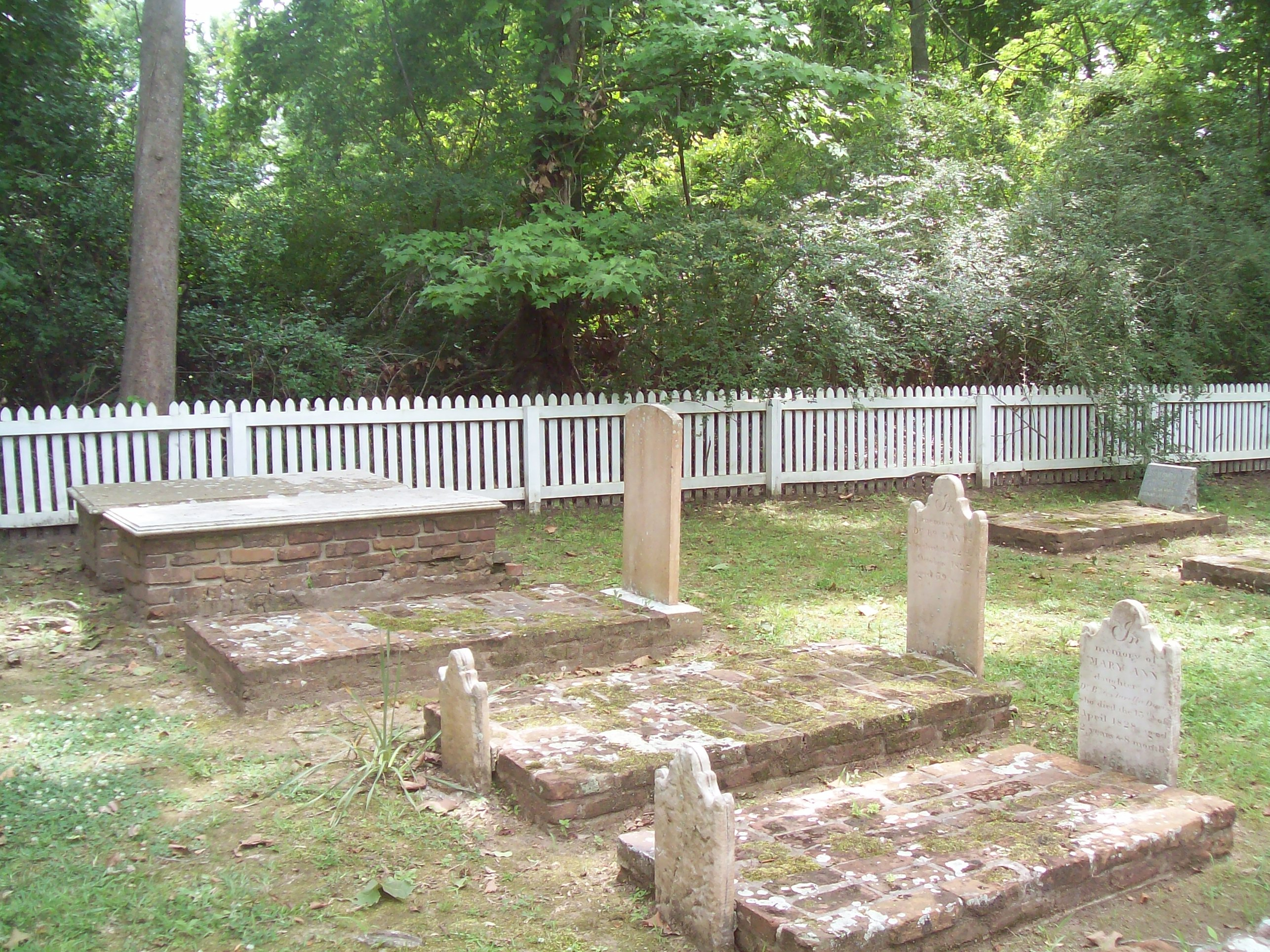
Locust Grove State Historic Site near St. Francisville, West Feliciana Parish

- Locust Grove State Historic Site (also known as Locust Grove Plantation Cemetery), near St. Francisville

== See also ==
- List of cemeteries in the United States
- Tombstone tourist
- Jazz funeral
