= Palace Theatre =

Palace Theatre (or Palace Theater) may refer to:

== Australia ==
- Palace Theatre, Melbourne, Victoria
- Palace Theatre, Sydney, New South Wales

== Canada ==
- Palace Theatre, housed in the Robillard Block, Montreal, Canada
- Palace Theatre, Calgary, Alberta
- Palace Theatre in London, Ontario, opened in 1929

== United Kingdom ==
- Palace Theatre, Kilmarnock, Scotland
- Palace Theatre, London, England
- Palace Theatre, Manchester, England
- Palace Theatre, Mansfield, England
- Palace Theatre, Newark, England
- Palace Theatre, Paignton, Devon, England
- Palace Theatre, Plymouth, Devon, England
- Palace Theatre, Redditch, England
- Watford Palace Theatre, England
- Palace Theatre, Westcliff-on-Sea, England
- Palace Theatre, Swansea, Wales

== United States ==
(by state then city)

=== Midwest ===
- Cadillac Palace Theatre, Chicago, Illinois
- Palace Theater (Gary, Indiana)
- Palace Theater (Kinsley, Kansas)
- Palace Theatre (Louisville, Kentucky)
- Palace Theater (Luverne, Minnesota)
- Palace Theatre (Saint Paul, Minnesota)
- Palace Theatre (Canton, Ohio)
- Palace Theatre (Cincinnati, Ohio)
- Palace Theatre (Cleveland, Ohio)
- Palace Theatre (Columbus, Ohio)
- Palace Theatre (Marion, Ohio)

=== Northeast ===
- Palace Theater (Bridgeport, Connecticut)
- Palace Theater, Stamford Center for the Arts, Stamford, Connecticut
- Palace Theater (Waterbury, Connecticut)
- Palace Theatre (Boston), Massachusetts
- Hanover Theatre for the Performing Arts, Worcester, Massachusetts
- Palace Theatre (Manchester, New Hampshire)
- Palace Theatre (Albany, New York)
- Palace Theatre (New York City)
- Palace Theatre (Syracuse, New York)
- Providence Performing Arts Center, Providence, Rhode Island

=== South ===
- Palace Theatre (Jonesboro, Louisiana)
- State Palace Theatre (New Orleans)
- Palace Theater, Turnage Theatre, Washington, North Carolina
- Palace Theatre, Greensburg Downtown Historic District (Greensburg, Pennsylvania)
- Palace Theatre, Broadway at the Beach, Myrtle Beach, South Carolina
- Palace Theater (Crossville, Tennessee)
- Palace Theatre (El Paso, Texas)
- Palace Theatre (Georgetown, Texas)
- Palace Theatre (Cape Charles, Virginia)

=== West ===
- Avalon Hollywood, Hollywood, California
- Palace Theater (Los Angeles), California
- Palace Theater (Hilo, Hawaii), Hawaii
- Palace Theatre (Silverton, Oregon), Oregon

== See also ==
- **
