= Hickory Springs Methodist Episcopal Church =

Historic church in Louisiana, United States

- U.S. National Register of Historic Places
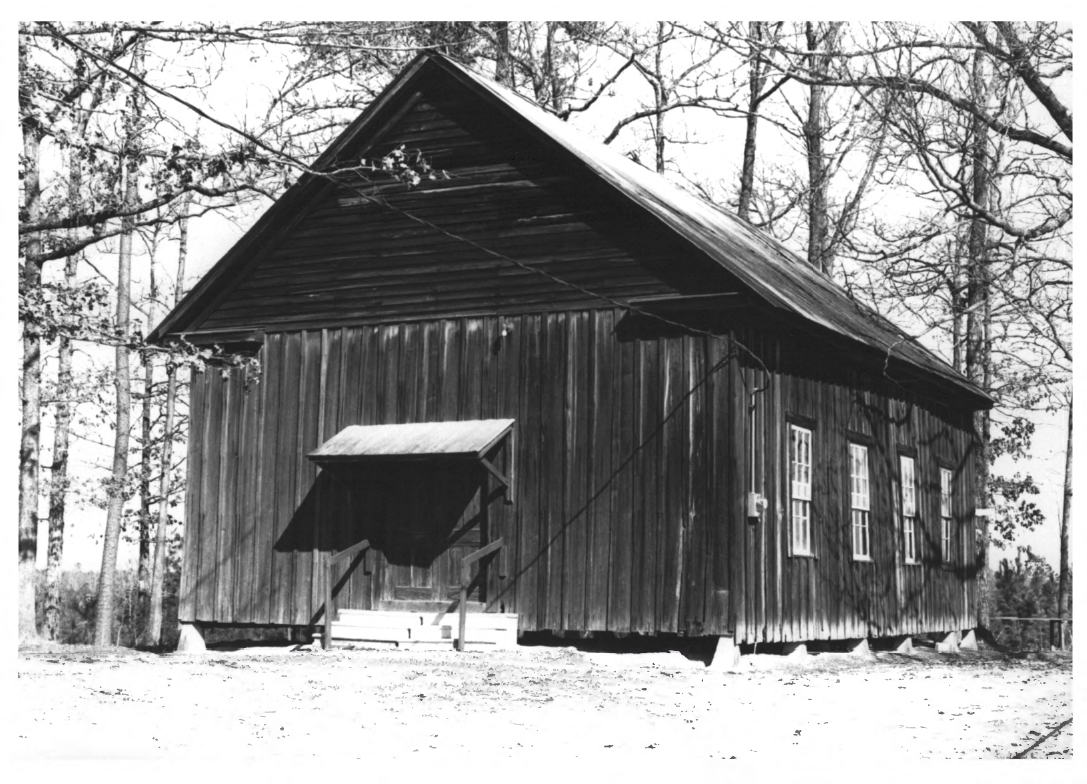

- Location within Louisiana Location within the United States
- Location: Along Hickory Springs Road, about 12 miles (19 km) southeast of Chatham, Louisiana
- Nearest city: Vixen, Louisiana
- Coordinates: 32°10′34″N 92°19′03″W
- Area: 1.67 acres (0.68 ha)
- Built: c.1900
- NRHP reference No.: 89000382
- Added to NRHP: May 5, 1989

Hickory Springs Methodist Episcopal Church is a historic church located along Hickory Springs Road, about 12 miles (19 km) southeast of Chatham, Louisiana.

The church and adjacent Hickory Springs Cemetery were established in 1841. The original church was a log building which served both as a church and as a school. The present church was constructed in 1900. Annual homecomings began in the early 1930s. Regular services ended because of declining local population. Annual homecomings continue being held on the 1st Sunday of October each year.

The church was added to the National Register of Historic Places on May 5, 1989.

== See also ==
- Brooklyn Church and Cemetery: also in Jackson Parish
- National Register of Historic Places listings in Jackson Parish, Louisiana
