= Shadden =

Shadden is a surname. Notable people with the surname include:

- John Shadden (born 1963), American competitive sailor
- Thomas Shadden (1920–2000), American politician
