= National Register of Historic Places listings in Jackson Parish, Louisiana =

Location of Jackson Parish in Louisiana

This is a list of the National Register of Historic Places listings in Jackson Parish, Louisiana.

This is intended to be a complete list of the properties on the National Register of Historic Places in Jackson Parish, Louisiana, United States. The locations of National Register properties for which the latitude and longitude coordinates are included below, may be seen in a map.

There are 6 properties listed on the National Register in the parish.

This National Park Service list is complete through NPS recent listings posted December 12, 2025.

== Current listings ==
| | Name on the Register | Image | Date listed | Location | City or town | Description |
|---|---|---|---|---|---|---|
| 1 | Brooklyn Church and Cemetery | Brooklyn Church and Cemetery | August 2, 1984 (#84001294) | Along Mariah Road, about 5.4 miles (8.7 km) southeast of Chatham; 32°15′24″N 92°22′40″W | Chatham vicinity | |
| 2 | Hickory Springs Methodist Episcopal Church | Hickory Springs Methodist Episcopal Church | May 5, 1989 (#89000382) | Along Hickory Springs Road, about 12 miles (19 km) southeast of Chatham, Louisiana; 32°10′34″N 92°19′03″W | Chatham vicinity | |
| 3 | John S. and Martha McGill Stewart Hunt House | | March 21, 2023 (#100008490) | 1231 South 1st St. 32°16′22″N 92°43′30″W | Hodge | |
| 4 | Palace Theatre | | July 30, 2008 (#08000731) | 125 Jimmie Davis Boulevard; 32°14′26″N 92°42′52″W | Jonesboro | |
| 5 | Simms-Ellis House | Simms-Ellis House | July 7, 1983 (#83000508) | 1438 LA 148; 32°24′51″N 92°38′28″W | Clay | |
| 6 | Wilder House | Wilder House | July 13, 1983 (#83000509) | 12070 Shell Avenue; 32°18′31″N 92°27′11″W | Chatham | |

== See also ==
- List of National Historic Landmarks in Louisiana
- National Register of Historic Places listings in Louisiana
