= Michael Sims =

American nonfiction writer

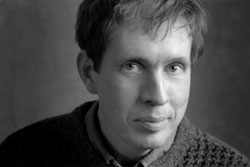
- Sims in 2003
- Born: February 17, 1958 (age 68); Crossville, Tennessee
- Occupations: author, anthologist
- Writing career
- Genre: Non-fiction

Michael Sims (born February 17, 1958, in Crossville, TN) is an American nonfiction writer. His books include Darwin's Orchestra (1997), Adam's Navel (2003), Apollo's Fire (2007), In the Womb: Animals (2009), and The Story of Charlotte's Web (2011). He is also an anthologist, and has edited of several volumes of Victorian and Edwardian fiction and poetry.

== Early life ==
Born in rural eastern Tennessee, near the small town of Crossville, Sims has described in interviews how he grew up in a household without a telephone, an automobile, or, at times, indoor plumbing. He spent his teenage years in a wheelchair because of rheumatic arthritis following an attack of rheumatic fever. Although Robert Macfarlane in the Sunday Times (London) said that Sims "is clearly the beneficiary of a wide-ranging American liberal-arts education", Sims did not attend university. But he developed in childhood a preoccupation with literature, art, and nature, themes that dominate his adult work.

== Career ==
Sims published his first book, Darwin's Orchestra, in 1997, about which Martin Gardner wrote, "Sims's range is awesome." But it was Sims's second book, Adam's Navel: A Natural and Cultural History of the Human Form, in 2003, that established his reputation as an original and witty observer of the natural world. Published simultaneously in the U.S. and England, it was chosen as a Library Journal Best Science Book and a New York Times Notable Book. In 2007 Viking Press published Apollo's Fire: A Day on Earth in Nature and Imagination, which National Public Radio chose as one of the best science books of the year. In 2009 National Geographic Books published In the Womb: Animals, a companion book to two installments of the acclaimed In the Womb series on the National Geographic Channel.

Sims's writing has been published in many periodicals, including the Washington Post, Los Angeles Times, New Statesman, Chronicle of Higher Education, Gourmet, Orion and American Archaeology.

He has appeared on many radio and television programs, including a multi-part documentary about women's bodies on BBC Radio 4's popular program Woman's Hour, as well as on The Early Show on CBS and Inside Edition.

== Books by Michael Sims ==
- Darwin's Orchestra: An Almanac of Nature in History and the Arts (1997, Henry Holt)
- Adam's Navel: A Natural and Cultural History of the Human Form (2003, Viking; published in England by Allen Lane/Penguin, with the subtitles "A Natural and Cultural History of the Human Body" and "The Weird and Wonderful Story of the Human Body")
- Apollo's Fire: A Day on Earth in Nature and Imagination (2007, Viking); U.S. paperback (Penguin) subtitle "A Journey through the Extraordinary Wonders of an Ordinary Day"
- In the Womb: Animals (2009. National Geographic Books), linked to a documentary series on the National Geographic Channel
- The Story of Charlotte's Web (2011, Walker) subtitle "E. B. White's Eccentric Life in Nature and the Birth of an American Classic"
- The Adventures of Henry Thoreau: A Young Man's Unlikely Path to Walden Pond (2014, Bloomsbury USA)
- Arthur and Sherlock (2017, Bloomsbury)

== Collections edited ==
- The Annotated Archy and Mehitabel (2006), by Don Marquis, Edited with Notes and Introduction by Michael Sims (Penguin Classics)
- Arsene Lupin, Gentleman-Thief (2007), by Maurice Leblanc, Edited with Notes and Introduction by Michael Sims (Penguin Classics)
- The Penguin Book of Gaslight Crime (2009), Edited with Notes and Introduction by Michael Sims (Penguin Classics)
- Dracula's Guest: A Connoisseur's Collection of Victorian Vampire Stories (2010), Edited with Notes and Introduction by Michael Sims (Walker & Company)
- The Penguin Book of Victorian Women in Crime: Forgotten Cops and Private Eyes from the Time of Sherlock Holmes (2011), Edited with Notes and Introduction by Michael Sims (Penguin Classics)
- The Dead Witness: A Connoisseur's Collection of Victorian Detective Stories (2011) Edited with Notes and Introduction by Michael Sims (Walker & Company)
- Frankenstein Dreams: A Connoisseur's Collection of Victorian Science Fiction (2017, Bloomsbury USA)
- The Penguin Book of Murder Mysteries (2023), Edited with Notes and Introduction by Michael Sims (Penguin Classics)
