= Crossville, Tennessee =

Crossville
- City
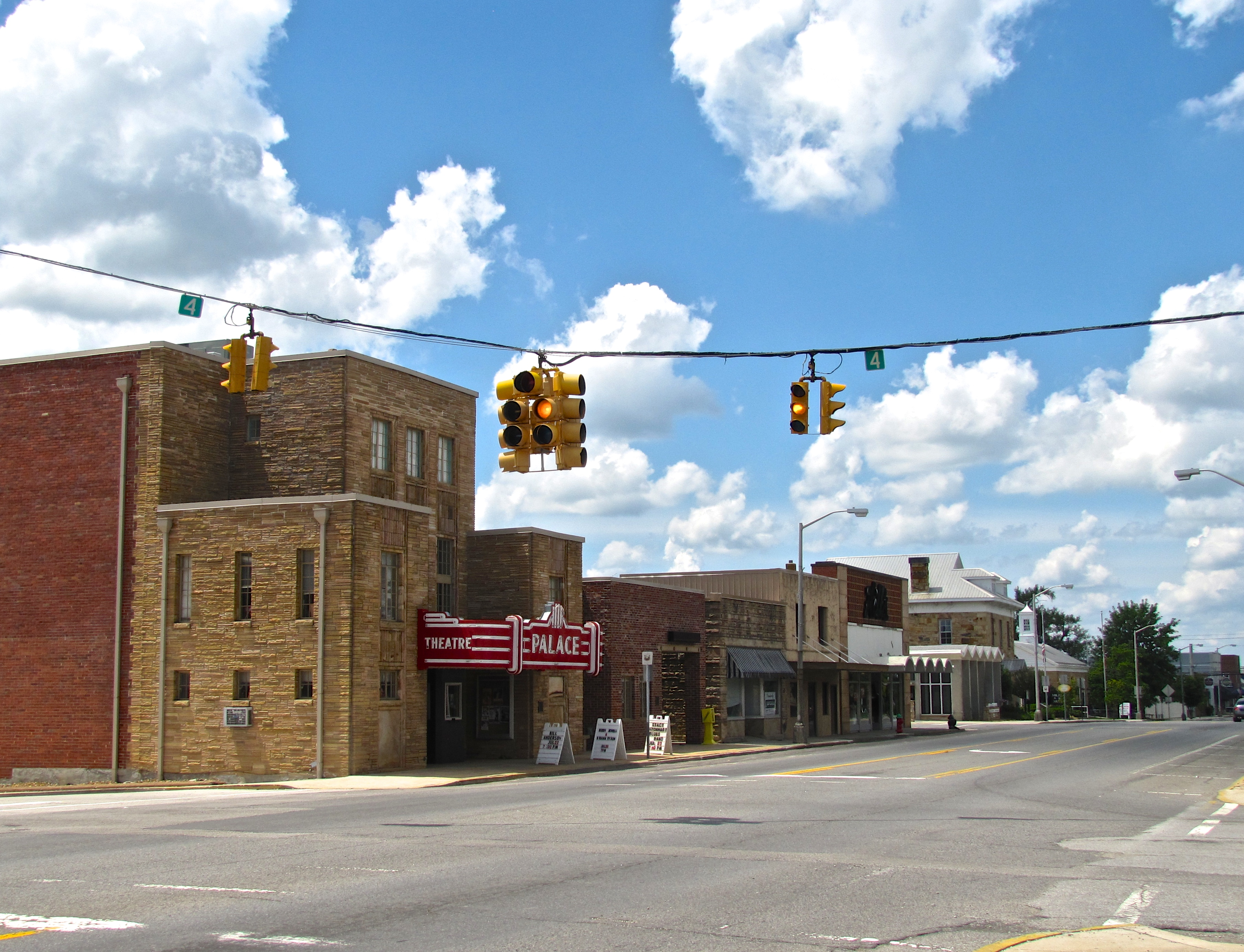
- Main Street in Downtown Crossville

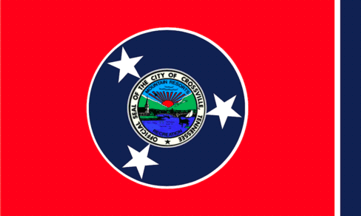
- Flag Seal

- Location of Crossville in Cumberland County, Tennessee
- Coordinates: 35°57′15″N 85°1′53″W
- Country: United States
- State: Tennessee
- County: Cumberland
- Established: 1856
- Incorporated: 1901
- Named for: Intersection of two early roads

Government
  - Mayor: RJ Crawford

Area
  - Total: 20.86 sq mi (54.03 km^{2})
  - Land: 20.44 sq mi (52.95 km^{2})
  - Water: 0.42 sq mi (1.08 km^{2})
- Elevation: 1,857 ft (566 m)

Population (2020)
  - Total: 12,071
  - Density: 590.4/sq mi (227.96/km^{2})
- Time zone: UTC-6 (Central (CST))
  - Summer (DST): UTC-5 (CDT)
- ZIP codes: 38555, 38557, 38558, 38571, 38572
- Area code: 931 423
- FIPS code: 47-18540
- GNIS feature ID: 1306203
- Website: crossvilletn.gov

Crossville is a city in and the county seat of Cumberland County, Tennessee, United States. It is part of the Crossville Micropolitan Statistical Area. The population was 12,071 at the 2020 census.

== History ==
Crossville developed at the intersection of a branch of the Great Stage Road, which connected the Knoxville area with the Nashville area, and the Kentucky Stock Road, a cattle drovers' path connecting Middle Tennessee with Kentucky and later extending south to Chattanooga. These two roads are roughly paralleled by modern US-40 and US-127, respectively.

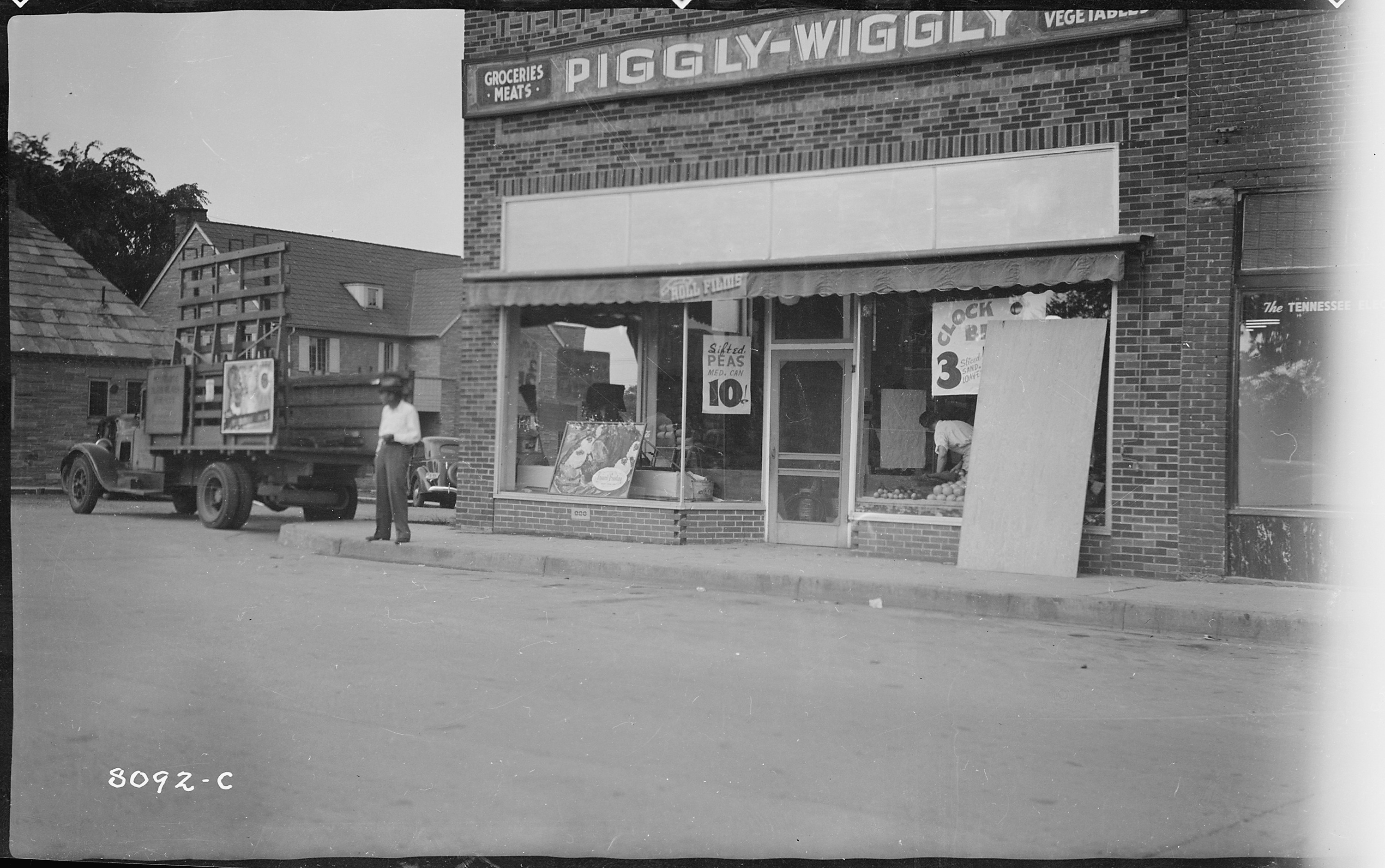
1939 photo of Crossville's Piggly Wiggly, which at the time was located at the corner of Main and 2nd

Around 1800, an early American settler, Samuel Lambeth, opened a store at this junction, and the small community that developed around it became known as Lambeth's Crossroads. The store was at what has become the intersection of Main and Stanley Streets, just south of the courthouse. By the time a post office was established in the 1830s, the community had taken the name "Crossville". In the early 1850s, James Scott, a merchant from nearby Sparta, purchased Lambeth's store and renamed it Scott's Tavern.

When Cumberland County was formed in 1856, Crossville, being nearest to the center of the county, was chosen as county seat. Scott donated the initial 40 acres (16 ha) for the erection of a courthouse and town square.

Crossville and Cumberland County suffered rampant pillaging throughout the Civil War as the well-developed roads made the area accessible to both occupying Union and Confederate forces and bands of renegade guerrillas. With divided communities and families, there was vicious guerrilla warfare, and residents suffered as if there were major battles in the area. The county was divided throughout the conflict, sending a roughly equal number of troops to both sides.

After World War I, U.S. 70 helped connect the town and area to markets for its produce and goods. Additional highways built after World War II improved transportation in the region.

During the Great Depression, the federal government's Subsistence Homestead Division initiated a housing project south of Crossville known as the Cumberland Homesteads. The project's purpose was to provide small farms for several hundred impoverished families. The project's recreational area later became the nucleus for Cumberland Mountain State Park. In 1934, First Lady Eleanor Roosevelt visited Crossville and the Cumberland Homesteads Project.

Crossville was a sundown town as late as the 1950s, with a sign at the city limits warning African Americans not to stay after nightfall.

== Geography ==
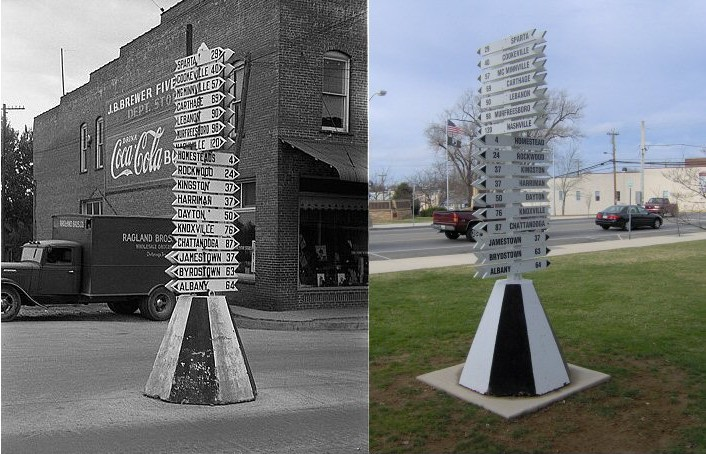
Crossville has long been a great crossroads of East and Middle Tennessee.

Crossville is located at the center of Cumberland County at 35°57′15″N 85°1′53″W (35.954221, -85.031267). The city is situated atop the Cumberland Plateau amid the headwaters of the Obed River, which slices a gorge north of Crossville en route to its confluence with the Emory River to the northeast. Crossville is roughly halfway between the plateau's eastern escarpment along Walden Ridge and its western escarpment along the Highland Rim. Several small lakes are on Crossville's outskirts, including Lake Tansi to the south, Lake Holiday to the west, and Byrd Lake at nearby Cumberland Mountain State Park. The average elevation of Crossville is about 1,890 feet (580 m) above sea level.

Crossville developed at the intersection of two major stage roads by which settlers moved through the area. The roads were gradually widened, improved and turned into paved roads. Two major federal highways—U.S. Route 70, which traverses Tennessee from east to west, and U.S. Route 127, which traverses Tennessee from north to south—now roughly follow the old routes. Interstate 40, which runs roughly parallel to U.S. 70, passes through the northern part of Crossville. Crossville is about 35 miles (56 km) east of Cookeville, 80 miles (130 km) north of Chattanooga, and 70 miles (110 km) west of Knoxville.

According to the United States Census Bureau, Crossville has an area of 20.3 square miles (52.7 km^{2}), of which 20.0 square miles (51.7 km^{2}) is land and 0.4 square miles (1.0 km^{2}), or 1.95%, is water.

=== Climate ===
Crossville has a humid subtropical climate (Köppen Cfa), with warm summers and cool winters. Temperatures in Crossville are moderated by the city's high elevation and the Cumberland Plateau. Precipitation is abundant and evenly distributed (although the early autumn months are drier), with an average of 55.55 in (1,411 mm). Snowfall is moderate and somewhat common, with an average of 14.2 in (36 cm).

Climate data for Crossville, Tennessee (1991–2020 normals, extremes 1912–present)
Month	Jan	Feb	Mar	Apr	May	Jun	Jul	Aug	Sep	Oct	Nov	Dec	Year
Record high °F (°C)	81 (27)	77 (25)	82 (28)	91 (33)	95 (35)	102 (39)	102 (39)	102 (39)	103 (39)	90 (32)	80 (27)	73 (23)	103 (39)
Mean maximum °F (°C)	63.5 (17.5)	66.7 (19.3)	74.0 (23.3)	79.9 (26.6)	83.8 (28.8)	88.5 (31.4)	90.4 (32.4)	89.7 (32.1)	87.6 (30.9)	81.1 (27.3)	72.3 (22.4)	64.3 (17.9)	91.9 (33.3)
Mean daily maximum °F (°C)	41.6 (5.3)	45.4 (7.4)	53.6 (12.0)	63.5 (17.5)	71.6 (22.0)	78.5 (25.8)	81.8 (27.7)	81.1 (27.3)	75.9 (24.4)	65.7 (18.7)	54.1 (12.3)	45.1 (7.3)	63.2 (17.3)
Daily mean °F (°C)	33.4 (0.8)	36.7 (2.6)	44.3 (6.8)	53.5 (11.9)	61.8 (16.6)	69.0 (20.6)	72.5 (22.5)	71.4 (21.9)	65.6 (18.7)	54.8 (12.7)	44.4 (6.9)	37.0 (2.8)	53.7 (12.1)
Mean daily minimum °F (°C)	25.1 (−3.8)	28.0 (−2.2)	35.0 (1.7)	43.5 (6.4)	52.0 (11.1)	59.6 (15.3)	63.2 (17.3)	61.7 (16.5)	55.3 (12.9)	43.8 (6.6)	34.6 (1.4)	28.9 (−1.7)	44.2 (6.8)
Mean minimum °F (°C)	4.5 (−15.3)	9.2 (−12.7)	17.2 (−8.2)	28.2 (−2.1)	36.1 (2.3)	48.7 (9.3)	55.2 (12.9)	53.7 (12.1)	41.1 (5.1)	27.9 (−2.3)	18.9 (−7.3)	11.3 (−11.5)	1.4 (−17.0)
Record low °F (°C)	−25 (−32)	−15 (−26)	−6 (−21)	14 (−10)	28 (−2)	33 (1)	40 (4)	41 (5)	27 (−3)	15 (−9)	−7 (−22)	−17 (−27)	−25 (−32)
Average precipitation inches (mm)	5.49 (139)	5.66 (144)	6.08 (154)	6.07 (154)	5.35 (136)	5.27 (134)	5.31 (135)	4.14 (105)	4.28 (109)	3.68 (93)	4.70 (119)	6.54 (166)	62.57 (1,589)
Average snowfall inches (cm)	3.5 (8.9)	4.4 (11)	2.7 (6.9)	0.2 (0.51)	0.0 (0.0)	0.0 (0.0)	0.0 (0.0)	0.0 (0.0)	0.0 (0.0)	0.0 (0.0)	0.2 (0.51)	3.1 (7.9)	14.1 (36)
Average precipitation days (≥ 0.01 in)	15.2	13.2	14.3	13.1	13.6	13.3	12.8	10.9	9.6	9.8	11.4	14.0	151.2
Average snowy days (≥ 0.1 in)	4.1	3.2	1.4	0.1	0.0	0.0	0.0	0.0	0.0	0.0	0.2	2.4	11.4
Source: NOAA

== Demographics ==
Historical population
Census	Pop.	Note	%±
1870	95		—
1880	99		4.2%
1890	266		168.7%
1910	763		—
1920	948		24.2%
1930	1,128		19.0%
1940	1,511		34.0%
1950	2,291		51.6%
1960	4,668		103.8%
1970	5,381		15.3%
1980	6,394		18.8%
1990	6,930		8.4%
2000	8,981		29.6%
2010	10,795		20.2%
2020	12,071		11.8%

=== 2020 census ===
As of the 2020 census, Crossville had a population of 12,071, 5,193 households, and 2,777 families residing in the city. Of those households, 27.3% had children under the age of 18 living in them; 37.6% were married-couple households, 20.2% were households with a male householder and no spouse or partner present, and 34.9% were households with a female householder and no spouse or partner present. About 36.1% of all households were made up of individuals and 17.1% had someone living alone who was 65 years of age or older.

The median age was 40.8 years; 22.2% of residents were under the age of 18 and 23.3% of residents were 65 years of age or older. For every 100 females there were 91.2 males, and for every 100 females age 18 and over there were 87.3 males age 18 and over.

94.9% of residents lived in urban areas, while 5.1% lived in rural areas.

There were 5,816 housing units, of which 10.7% were vacant. The homeowner vacancy rate was 2.5% and the rental vacancy rate was 8.7%.

Racial composition as of the 2020 census
Race	Number	Percent
White	10,785	89.3%
Black or African American	113	0.9%
American Indian and Alaska Native	50	0.4%
Asian	193	1.6%
Native Hawaiian and Other Pacific Islander	2	0.0%
Some other race	331	2.7%
Two or more races	597	4.9%
Hispanic or Latino (of any race)	765	6.3%

=== 2000 census ===
As of the census of 2000, there was a population of 8,981, with 3,795 households and 2,440 families residing in the city. The population density was 609.2 inhabitants per square mile (235.2/km^{2}). There were 4,268 housing units at an average density of 289.5 per square mile (111.8/km^{2}). The racial makeup of the city was 97.12% White, 0.04% African American, 0.23% Native American, 0.35% Asian, 0.04% Pacific Islander, 1.04% from other races, and 1.18% from two or more races. Hispanic or Latino people of any race were 2.43% of the population.

There were 3,795 households, out of which 27.4% had children under the age of 18 living with them, 45.2% were married couples living together, 15.5% had a female householder with no husband present, and 35.7% were non-families. 31.3% of all households were made up of individuals, and 13.1% had someone living alone who was 65 years of age or older. The average household size was 2.25 and the average family size was 2.79.

In the city, the population was spread out, with 22.6% under the age of 18, 9.3% from 18 to 24, 26.5% from 25 to 44, 21.8% from 45 to 64, and 19.9% who were 65 years of age or older. The median age was 38 years. For every 100 females, there were 85.0 males. For every 100 females age 18 and over, there were 81.5 males.

The median income for a household in the city was $25,796, and the median income for a family was $33,207. Males had a median income of $26,735 versus $20,217 for females. The per capita income for the city was $18,066. About 21.7% of families and 24.6% of the population were below the poverty line, including 36.2% of those under age 18 and 20.6% of those age 65 or over.

Recent population estimates show the population of Crossville around 11,498 in 2008.

== Points of interest ==
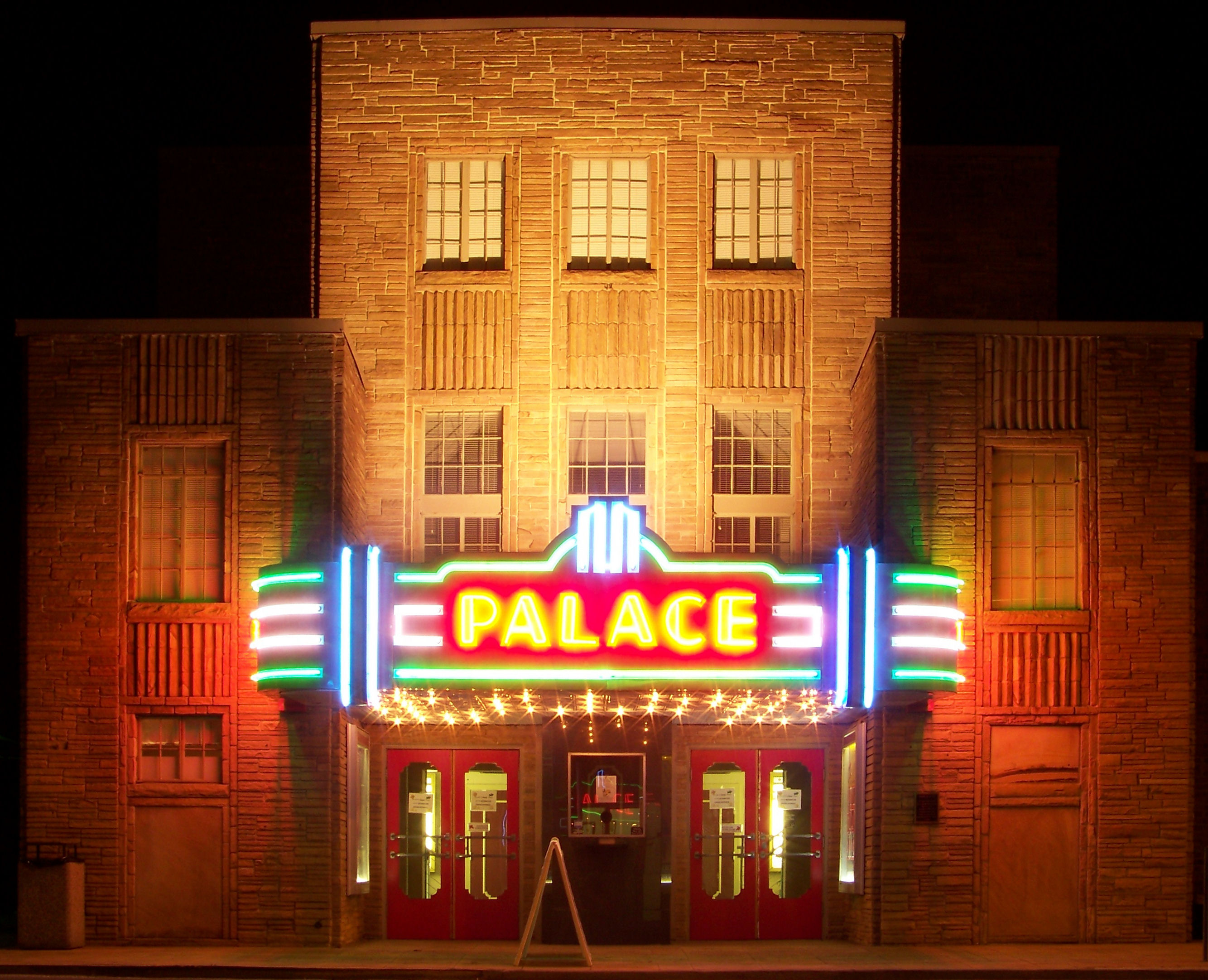
Palace Theatre

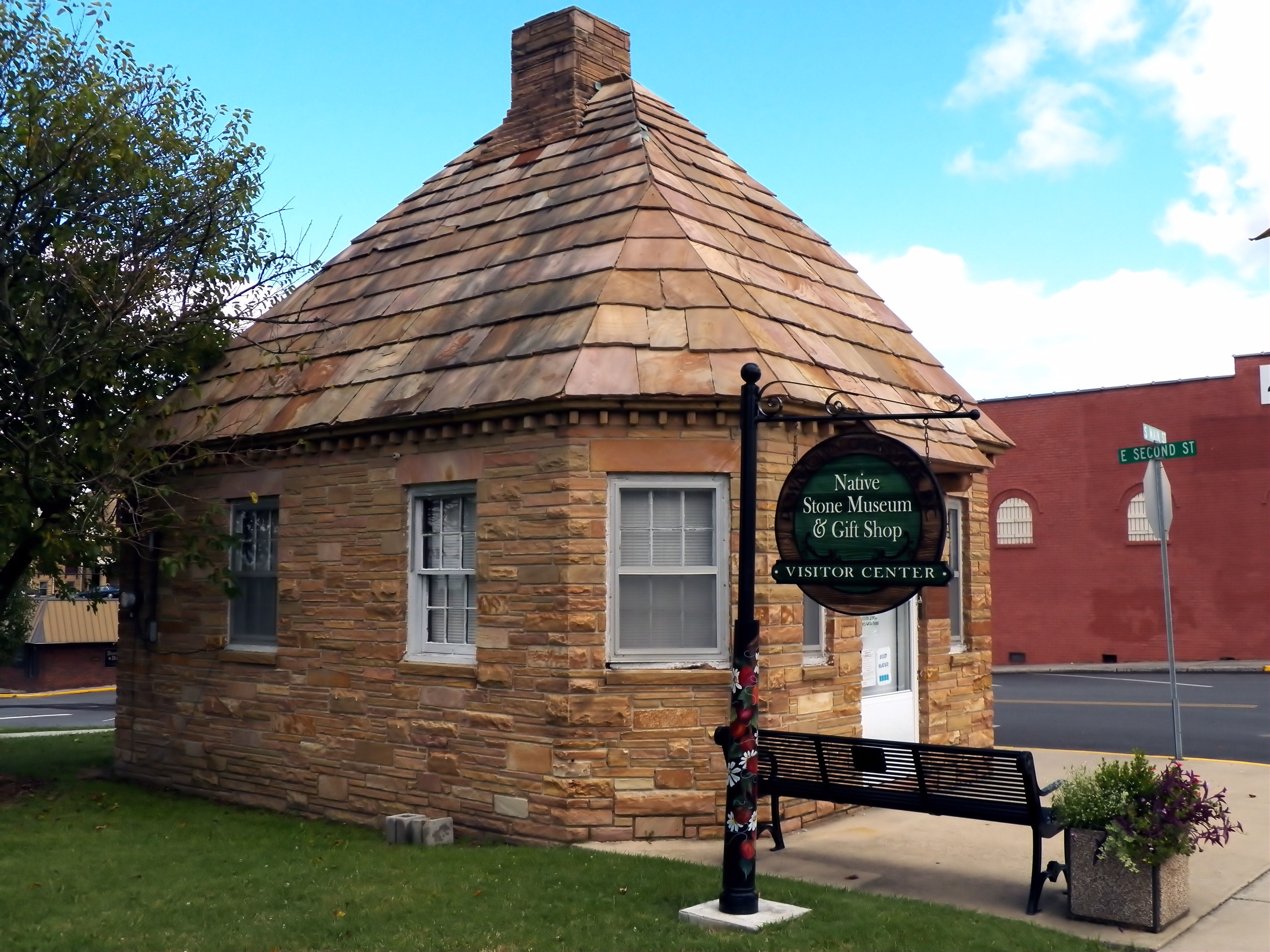
Native Stone Museum, one of many buildings in Crossville built of Crab Orchard Stone

- Cumberland Mountain State Park is immediately south of Crossville.
- The Cumberland Homesteads are also south of Crossville.
- The Native Stone Museum, in a 1930s-era Tennessee Highway Patrol station on the courthouse square, is dedicated to Crab Orchard Stone, a local building material used in many of the city's buildings.
- The Eco Travel Plaza truck stop in Crossville has obtained notoriety on social media as "Celina 52 Truck Stop".
- The Palace Theatre, which opened in 1938, still serves as a theater, performance venue, and meeting hall.
- The United States Chess Federation moved its corporate offices to Crossville from New Windsor, New York, in 2005. In 2022 the USCF announced that it would leave Crossville for St. Louis.
- The Highway 127 Corridor Sale, promoted as the world's largest yard sale, is held annually in August.
- The Cumberland County Playhouse is rural Tennessee's only major nonprofit professional performing arts resource, and one of rural America's 10 largest professional theaters. It serves more than 165,000 visitors annually with two indoor and two outdoor stages, young audience productions, a comprehensive dance program, a concert series and touring shows.
- Crossville calls itself "the golf capital of Tennessee" and features 12 courses: Stonehenge, Heatherhurst Crag, Heatherhurst Brae, Deer Creek, River Run, Four Seasons, The Bear Trace, Dorchester, Mountain Ridge, Renegade, Druid Hills, and Lake Tansi.
- The Cumberland County Fair is held every August.
- Art Circle Public Library
- Horace Burgess's Treehouse, a treehouse and church, closed in 2012.
- A free-speech zone on the Cumberland County Courthouse lawn was the site of several unofficial displays, including a statue of the Flying Spaghetti Monster, an Iraq and Afghanistan Soldier's Memorial, a miniature Statue of Liberty, chainsaw carvings of a nativity scene, Jesus carrying the cross, and monkeys and bears. As of April 30, 2008, the lawn is no longer a free-speech zone due largely to the controversy caused by the Flying Spaghetti Monster statue.

== Notable people ==
- Mandy Barnett, country music singer and actress born in Crossville
- Julie Ann Emery, actress born and raised here
- Stormi Henley, Miss Tennessee Teen USA 2009, Miss Teen USA 2009
- Milo Lemert, posthumous Medal of Honor recipient for action near Bellicourt, France, during World War I and buried in Crossville City Cemetery
- Earl Lloyd, first African-American to play in an NBA basketball game
- Thomas Shadden, politician, member of the Tennessee General Assembly and Crossville mayor
- Michael Sims, acclaimed nonfiction writer
- Charles Edward Snodgrass, U.S. representative
- Michael Turner, comic book artist, born in Crossville; president of the entertainment company Aspen MLT
- Marjorie Weaver, film actress

== See also ==
- List of sundown towns in the United States
