= Art Circle Public Library =

Public library in Crossville, Tennessee, U.S.

- 35.94858°N 85.02462°W
- Location: 3 East Street, Crossville, Tennessee, United States
- Type: Public
- Established: 1898; 128 years ago

Collection
- Size: 47,800

Other information
- Website: www.artcirclelibrary.info

The Art Circle Public Library (ACPL) is located in Crossville, Tennessee, United States, and is part of the Falling Water Regional Library.

Crossville, TN

== History ==
In 1898 the Art Circle, a local group of women that would gather to socialize, decided to collect and lend out books to the public from a room at the old Cumberland County High School (now the Military Museum). Due to its popularity, the first official Art Circle Public Library was opened in a former bank building in March 1939, and by 1975 the collection had expanded so much that a new building was built. In 2010, the collection had again expanded and needed a new home: after years of fundraising, the brand new ACPL building was opened just down the street from the 1975 building.

=== New director ===
In late 2008, Library Director Debra Kokes retired after 37 years of service to the local community. In mid-2009, Susie Randleman became the new Director of the ACPL.

=== New library building ===
The groundbreaking for the new ACPL was held on October 1, 2008. In March 2010, the library closed its doors to facilitate the move to a brand new building. The new ACPL, opened on May 3, 2010, is a 35,000-square-foot (3,300 m^{2}) building, made with local Crab Orchard stone and craftsman-style detailing. At its center—and reaching two and a half stories—is the Carol Darling Reading Room, named for the ACPL's former chair of the Board of Trustees, and one of its most active supporters, who died in 2008. Above this main room are balconies on the second floor that look out onto murals painted by Nashville artist Keith Tucker. These murals depict historical scenes of the county's past and present.

The floor also includes a Young Adult room; a Children's Library room, which has a “County Fair” theme and incorporates carved carousel animals, also done by artist Keith Tucker; a small café; a used bookstore area; two pianos; and meeting rooms available for public use. The second floor holds adult fiction; the nonfiction collection; and the Tennessee Room, dedicated to local authors and works about the state. Many seating areas and tables are scattered throughout both floors for all to use.

== Services ==
At the time of the move to the new building, the ACPL held a collection of over 44,000 print materials, 2,000 audio and over 1,600 video materials, as well as just over 100 print subscriptions available to the public. The collections have since been expanded. The library offers free computer services at stations on both floors, including wireless service, and access to databases such as the Tennessee Electronic Library and R.E.A.D.s digital book downloads.

The Friends of the Art Circle Public Library meets monthly to support the ACPL through fund raisers, book clubs and cultural events such as Book and Author Luncheons and annual dinners, and they contribute to programs and projects such as Dial-a-Story. The funds for the carousel and murals in the new library were raised and donated by the Friends.

Many events are held at the library, including local and regional author events, free concerts, and classes covering everything from crafting to dancing to genealogy. Children's story time is a weekly event and puppet shows starring Director Susie Randleman and Quackers the Talking Duck are frequently on the calendar. In the summer, free reading programs for children and teens are held, including weekly classes, programs and performances.

Recently formed at the ACPL is the Teen Advisory Group (T.A.G.), a group of teens that seek to promote teen reading and participation at the library through activities and interaction. The group puts out a monthly newsletter titled "T.A.G. You're It!"

In 2005, the ACPL also joined Dolly Parton's Imagination Library, a free, statewide program which provides one free book a month to registered children from birth to age five.

== Archives and Family Heritage Center ==
The Cumberland County Archives and Family Heritage Center opened its doors on August 29, 2010. Associated with the library and located just down the street, the goal of the center is to preserve local and county records, photographs, documents and other materials, and serve as a genealogical and historical research center. The archives intends to bring together documents and records that are held in offices across the county, and make them available to the public, which will be a lengthy process. Mostly staffed by volunteers, the Archives reading room is open to the public three days a week.
