= Horace Burgess's Treehouse =

Large treehouse in Tennessee, US (1993–2019)

Coordinates: 35.9855°N 84.9944°W

Horace Burgess's Treehouse (also known as the Minister's Treehouse) was a treehouse and church in Crossville, Tennessee, United States. Construction began in 1993, mostly by Burgess, who says that, in a vision, God commanded him to build a treehouse. It became a popular local attraction and was unofficially called the largest tree house in the world. It was closed by the state on August 30, 2012, for fire code violations. On October 22, 2019, the tree house completely burned to the ground in less than 15 minutes under unknown circumstances.

== History and description ==
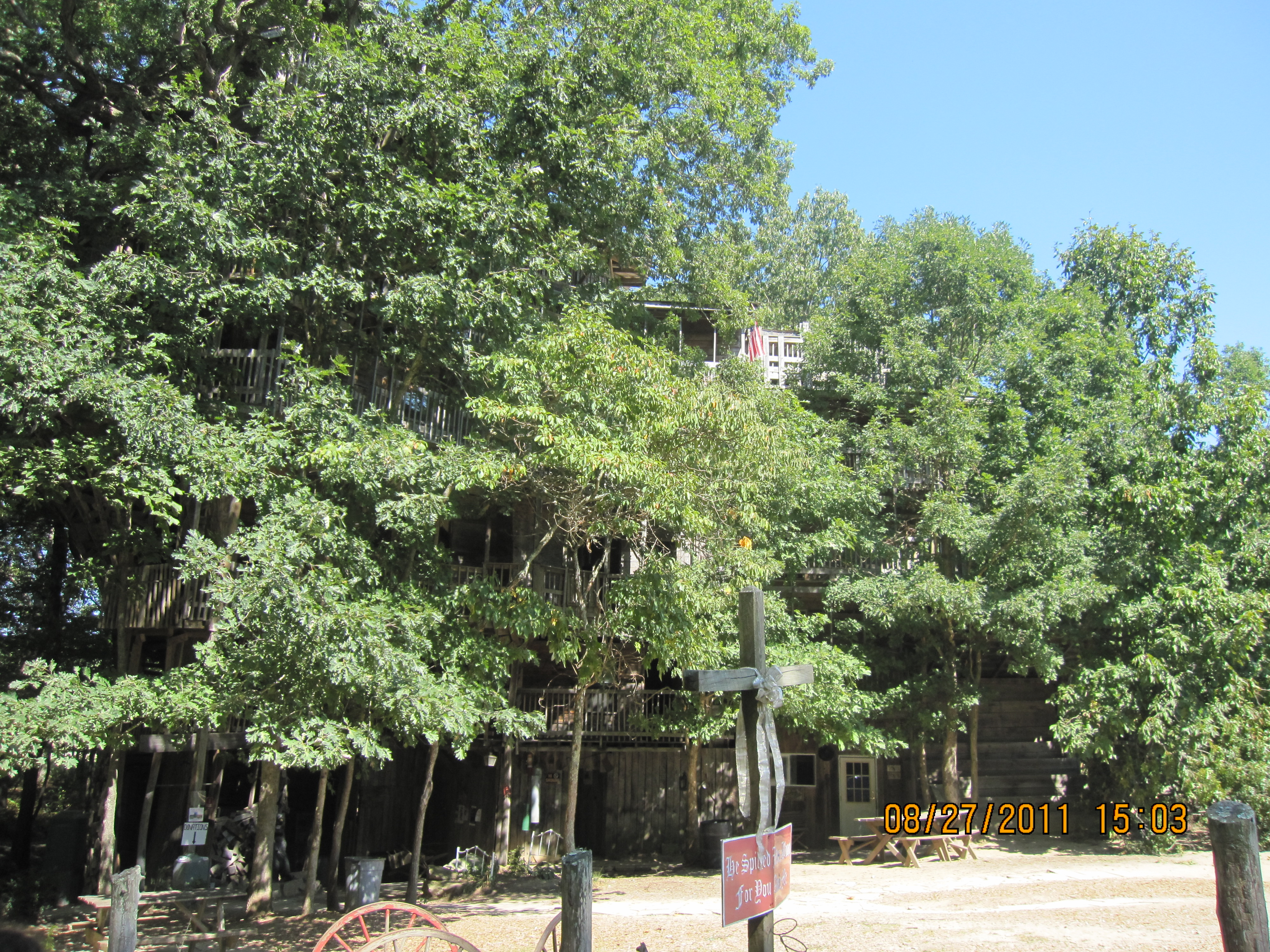
The exterior of the treehouse

Horace Burgess, a local minister, was praying in 1993 when he said God told him, "If you build a tree house, I'll see that you never run out of material." Inspired by the vision, Burgess began building the treehouse and continued working on it for the next 12 years. The 97-foot-tall (30 m) tree house and church was supported by a still-living 80 ft (24 m) white oak tree with a 12 ft-diameter (3.7 m) base, and relied on six other oak trees for support. He built it using 258,000 nails with a nailgun, and about 500 pounds of penny nails driven by hand. The treehouse was located on Beehive Lane in Crossville, Tennessee.

Over time, Burgess' treehouse became a popular tourist attraction. Burgess officiated 23 weddings in the treehouse church, and when not in service, the sanctuary doubled as a basketball court. Although there is no Guinness World Records category for largest treehouse, it was often referred to as the world's largest. Pete Nelson, the host of Treehouse Masters on Animal Planet, who has written six books about treehouses and owns a business building them, said it was "by far" the largest in the world.

In August 2012, the structure was closed to public access by the state because it had become a public attraction but did not follow building and fire safety codes. It was a "deathtrap", said one official, "it was very cool, but also very dangerous." The structure stood vacant and dilapidated for years, becoming a frequent target of vandalism. On October 22, 2019, the treehouse and its supporting trees completely burned to the ground in an inferno lasting about 15 minutes. The fire department responded; however, by the time they arrived nothing was left to save. "It was basically a pile of rubble when we pulled up. The fire was so intense we had to park 500 yards away", said an official. Fire officials said there was no electricity on site and no electric storms. The recent new owner of the treehouse, who had no insurance, declined to open an investigation. Burgess said most of the marriages he officiated there had not lasted, and that he was relieved after the fire; the treehouse had "always been a pain" he said.

== See also ==
- The Big Treehouse
