= Brooklyn Church and Cemetery =

Historic church in Louisiana, United States

- U.S. National Register of Historic Places
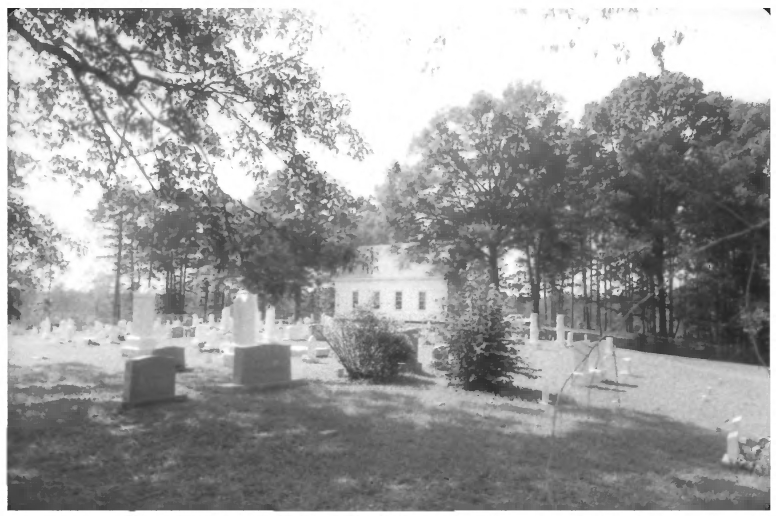

- Location within Louisiana Location within the United States
- Location: Along Mariah Road, about 5.4 miles (8.7 km) southeast of Chatham
- Nearest city: Chatham, Louisiana
- Coordinates: 32°15′24″N 92°22′40″W
- Area: 4 acres (1.6 ha)
- Built: 1902
- NRHP reference No.: 84001294
- Added to NRHP: August 2, 1984

Brooklyn Church and Cemetery is a historic church in Chatham, Louisiana.

The church building is a plain wood-frame structure built in 1902. It was deemed significant "as an almost perfectly preserved example of an austere turn-of-the-century country frame church. It represents a local North Louisiana unpretentious building tradition. Architecturally speaking, churches of this ilk should be regarded as remote descendants of provincial Greek Revival temple form churches. They are generally associated with the Methodist and Baptist sects and represent a building type which is a vital part of the material culture of the Upland South. But it is an archetype which is rapidly disappearing."

The cemetery has been used at least since the arrival of first settlers in the area in 1857. Almost all the tombstones date from c.1860 through the early twentieth century.

The church was added to the National Register of Historic Places on August 2, 1984.

== See also ==
- Hickory Springs Methodist Episcopal Church: also in Jackson Parish
- National Register of Historic Places listings in Jackson Parish, Louisiana
