= Milo Lemert =

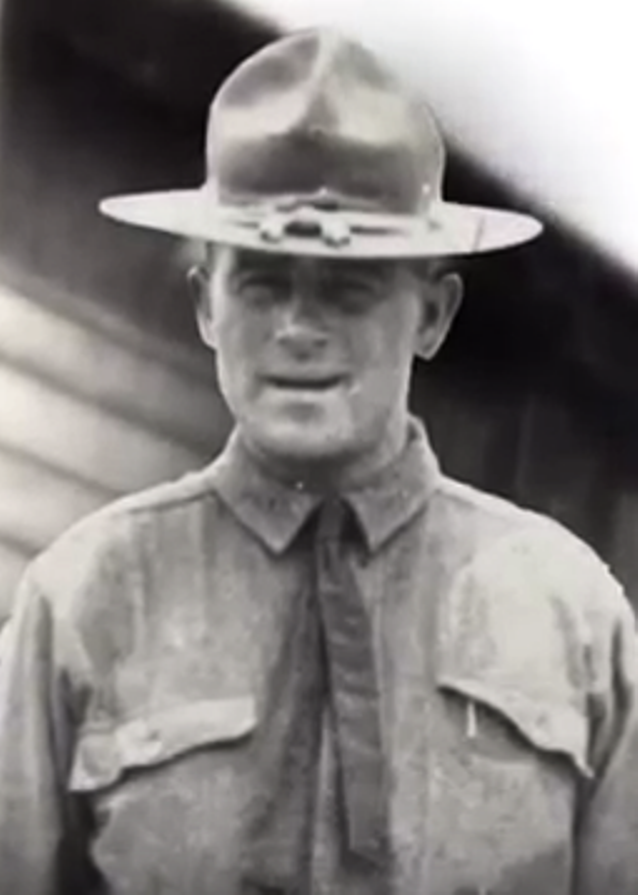
- Medal of Honor recipient
- Born: March 25, 1890; Marshalltown, Iowa, U.S.
- Died: September 29, 1918 (aged 28); Near Bellicourt, France
- Burial place: Crossville City Cemetery Crossville, Tennessee
- Military career
- Allegiance: United States of America
- Branch: United States Army
- Service years: 1917–1918
- Rank: First Sergeant
- Service number: 1315827
- Units: Company G, 119th Infantry, 30th Division
- Conflicts: World War I; Battle of St Quentin Canal †
- Awards: Medal of Honor

Milo Lemert (March 25, 1890 – September 29, 1918) was a soldier in the United States Army who received the Medal of Honor for his actions during World War I.

== Biography ==
Lemert was born in Marshalltown, Iowa on March 25, 1890, and died September 29, 1918, near Bellicourt, France. He was a member of First Christian Church in Crossville, Tennessee. His funeral service was conducted at the church before his burial in Crossville City Cemetery.

== Medal of Honor citation ==
Rank and organization: First Sergeant, U.S. Army, Company G, 119th Infantry, 30th Division. Place and date: Near Bellicourt, France, 29 September 1918. Entered service at: Crossville, Tenn. Birth: Marshalltown, Iowa. G.O. No.: 59, W.D., 1919.

Citation:

Seeing that the left flank of his company was held up, he located the enemy machinegun emplacement, which had been causing heavy casualties. In the face of heavy fire he rushed it single-handed, killing the entire crew with grenades. Continuing along the enemy trench in advance of the company, he reached another emplacement, which he also charged, silencing the gun with grenades. A third machinegun emplacement opened up on him from the left and with similar skill and bravery he destroyed this also. Later, in company with another sergeant, he attacked a fourth machinegun nest, being killed as he reached the parapet of the emplacement. His courageous action in destroying in turn 4 enemy machinegun nests prevented many casualties among his company and very materially aided in achieving the objective.

== See also ==
- List of Medal of Honor recipients
- List of Medal of Honor recipients for World War I
