= Palace Theatre, Newark =

Theatre in Newark-on-Trent, England

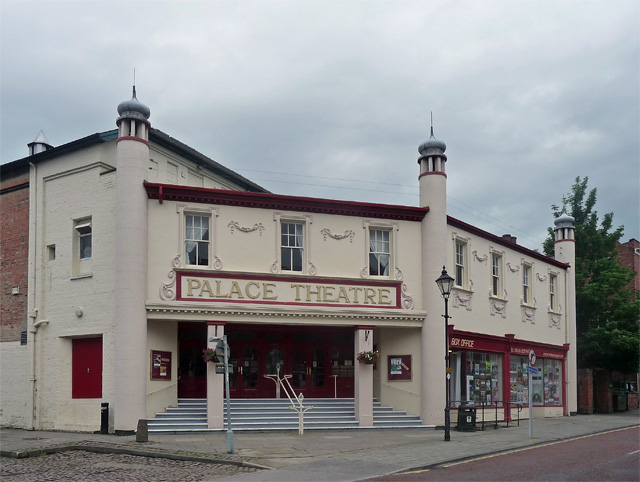
- Palace Theatre in 2012
- Interactive map of Palace Theatre, Newark
- Address: Appleton Gate, Newark-on-Trent; United Kingdom
- Coordinates: 53°04′36.1″N 0°48′23″W
- Capacity: 630
- Type: Theatre

Construction
- Opened: 5 July 1920
- Renovated: 1988 (200000£)
- Years active: 1920–present

Website
- https://www.palacenewark.com/

The Palace Theatre is a 20th century Neo-Byzantine style theatre located in Newark-on-Trent, United Kingdom.

== Architecture ==
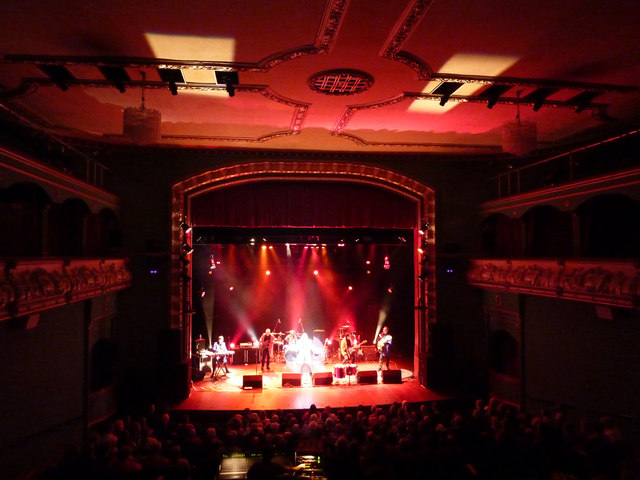
The interior of the theatre in 2013

Its Neo-Byzantine style was, at the time, considered exotic, up-marketed and fashionable.

The main theatre's entrance façade follows the angle of the road junction, being divided into two bays by shafts with domed pinnacles rising several feet above the parapet. Ample foyer and refreshment room includes a big entrance with detailed wooden doors. The second floors has more detail. Three windows with Neo-classic details in-between them. The facade seems to be supported with 2 Arab-style minarets. The stage tower has a mansard roof.

Between the windows and the entrance the main sign of the theatre is held. Besides the entrance facade a similar one can be seen with a memorabilia store. After its 200000£ renovation in 1988, some details were lost.

In the interior, the theatre has 630 which include disabled seating. The theatre has free superfast Wi-Fi capable of video conferencing and en-suite toilets. The auditorium has a curiously archaic appearance, like an early music hall, with balconies on three sides. The ceiling is flat, made up of eight panels each bordered with delicate plaster mouldings. The proscenium has a flattened arch with a width of 8.5m and a height of 6.7m. The orchestra pit has been rebuilt and is capable of being covered over to provide an apron. Originally the stalls floor was only slightly raked.

The Palace theatre has a 1920s style café.

== History ==
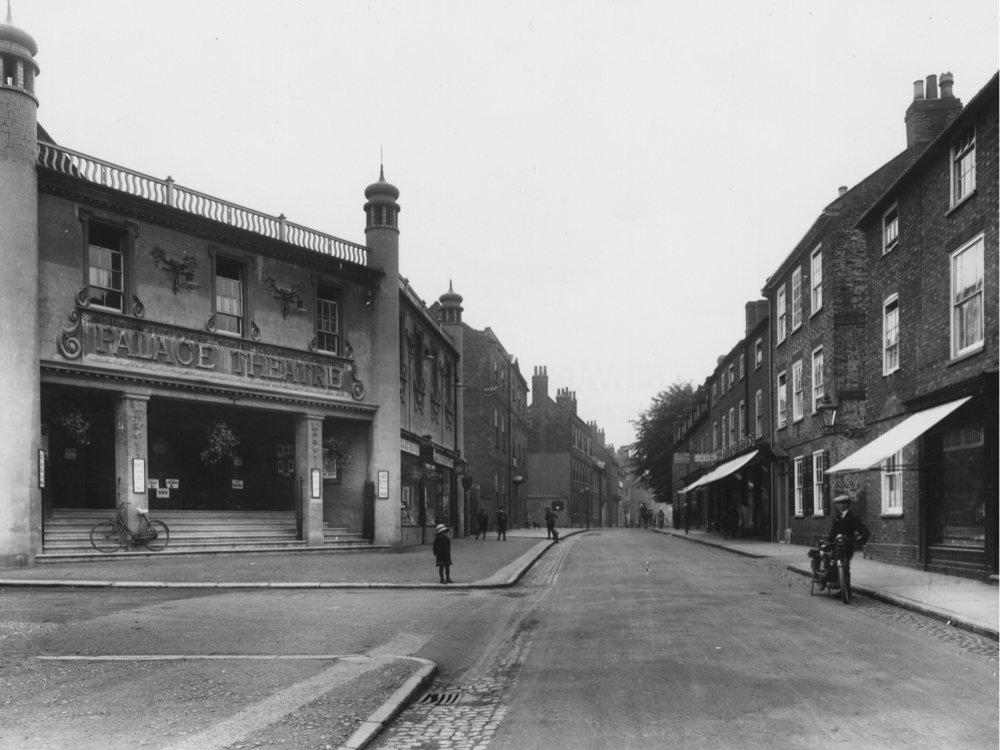
Palace Theatre in 1923

Built by local entrepreneur Emily Blagg, who, in a time when the suffragettes were fighting for female independence, managed to carve out a successful career in property development.

She had already opened Newark's first cinema, the Kinema on Baldertongate, in 1913 as well as building The Park and Lime Grove, Blagg made the decision to expand on her small empire and knocked down a building to create her vision of the perfect art deco theatre.

The theatre opened in 5 July 1920. Blagg was a businesswoman and, although she opened the Palace Theatre as a cinema, she made sure to fit it out with a stage and orchestra pit to allow for the possibility that the town's appetite for film might wane. And within the year a catalogue of live events was in place.

Its first screening, a version of King Solomon's Mines, it quickly became a popular haunt for the residents of Newark.

Its tall minarets proved the ideal lookout post for spotting fires during the Second World War.

It was altered in 1974 by Gordon Benoy and Partners, and again in 1988 by John Perkins when the seating was reduced and the circle slips boxes were created.

The Palace Theatre was designated a Grade II Listed building in 1993.

While the cinema is no more, the Palace Theatre continues the tradition of hosting fantastic entertainment and bringing famous names to the town, which in recent years have included Jason Manford, Jimmy Carr, Joan Armatrading, Jason Donovan and more.

== See also ==
- Palace Theatre
- Listed buildings

== Bibliography ==
- Lost Newark. Amberley Publishing. 2017.
- Gaye, Freda, ed. (1967). Who's Who in the Theatre (fourteenth ed.). London: Sir Isaac Pitman and Sons. OCLC 5997224.
- Herbert, Ian, ed. (1977). Who's Who in the Theatre (sixteenth ed.). London and Detroit: Pitman Publishing and Gale Research. ISBN 978-0-273-00163-8.
- Bader, Robert S. (2016). Four of the Three Musketeers; the Marx Brothers on Stage. Evanston, Illinois: Northwestern University Press. ISBN 978-0810134164.
- Mander, Raymond; Joe Mitchenson (1963). The Theatres of London. London: Rupert Hart-Davis. OCLC 1110747260.
- Morton, William; Henry Chance Newton (1905). Sixty Years' Stage Service: Being a Record of the Life of Charles Morton. London: Gale and Polden. OCLC 5317613.
- Pearson, Hesketh (2001) [1935]. Gilbert and Sullivan: A Biography. Cornwall: Stratus. ISBN 978-1-84232-167-6.
- Weightman, Gavin (1992). Bright Lights, Big City: London Entertained, 1830–1950. London: Collins & Brown. ISBN 978-1-85585-131-3.
- Wood, Henry J. (1946). My Life of Music. London: Gollancz. OCLC 614156984.
