= Palace Theater (Crossville, Tennessee) =

- U.S. National Register of Historic Places
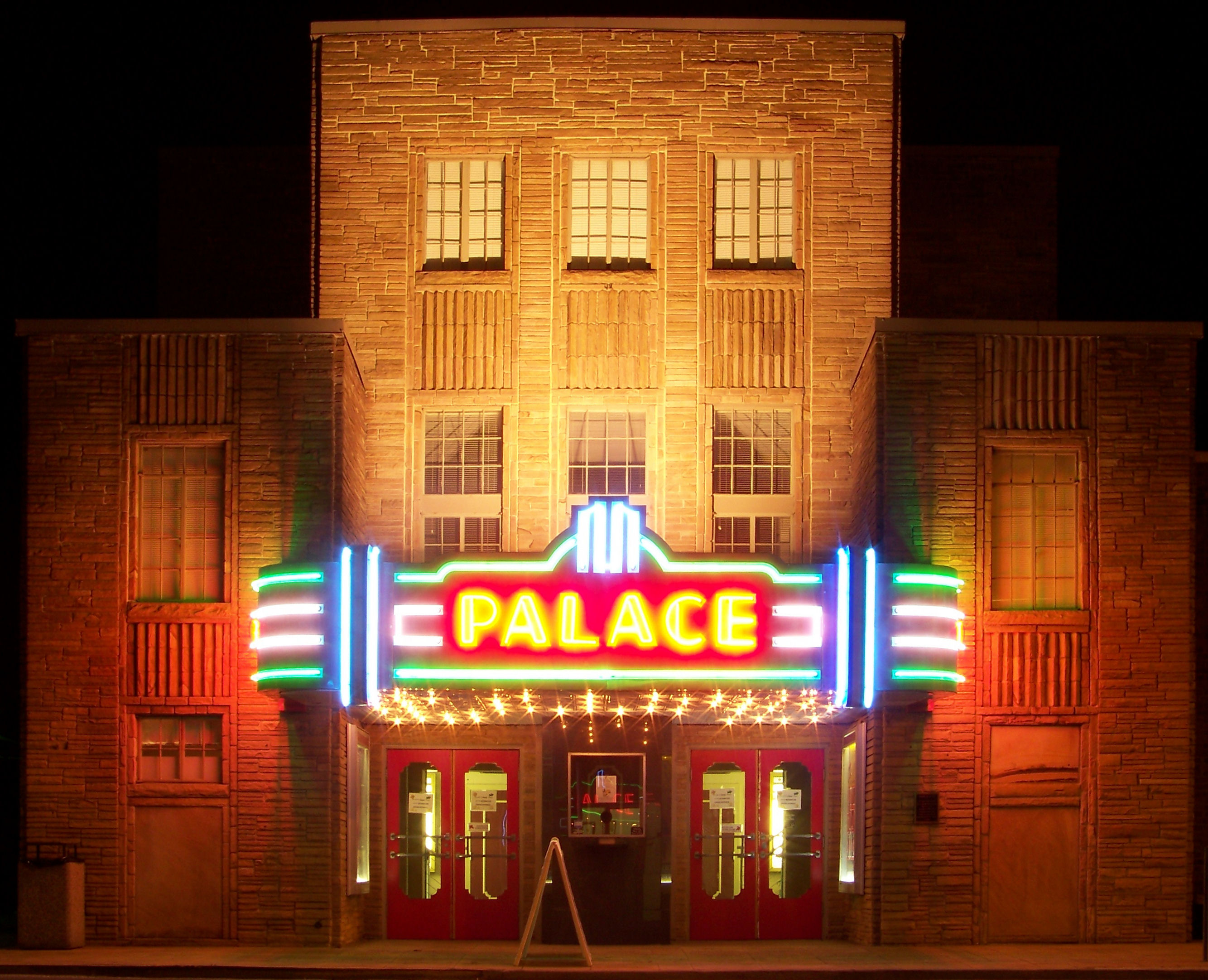
- Night

- Location within Tennessee Location within the United States
- Location: 210 N. Main St., Crossville, Tennessee
- Coordinates: 35°56′49″N 85°1′33″W
- Area: less than one acre
- Architect: Eston Smith; William Garrison
- Architectural style: Art Deco, Moderne
- NRHP reference No.: 93001477
- Added to NRHP: January 7, 1994

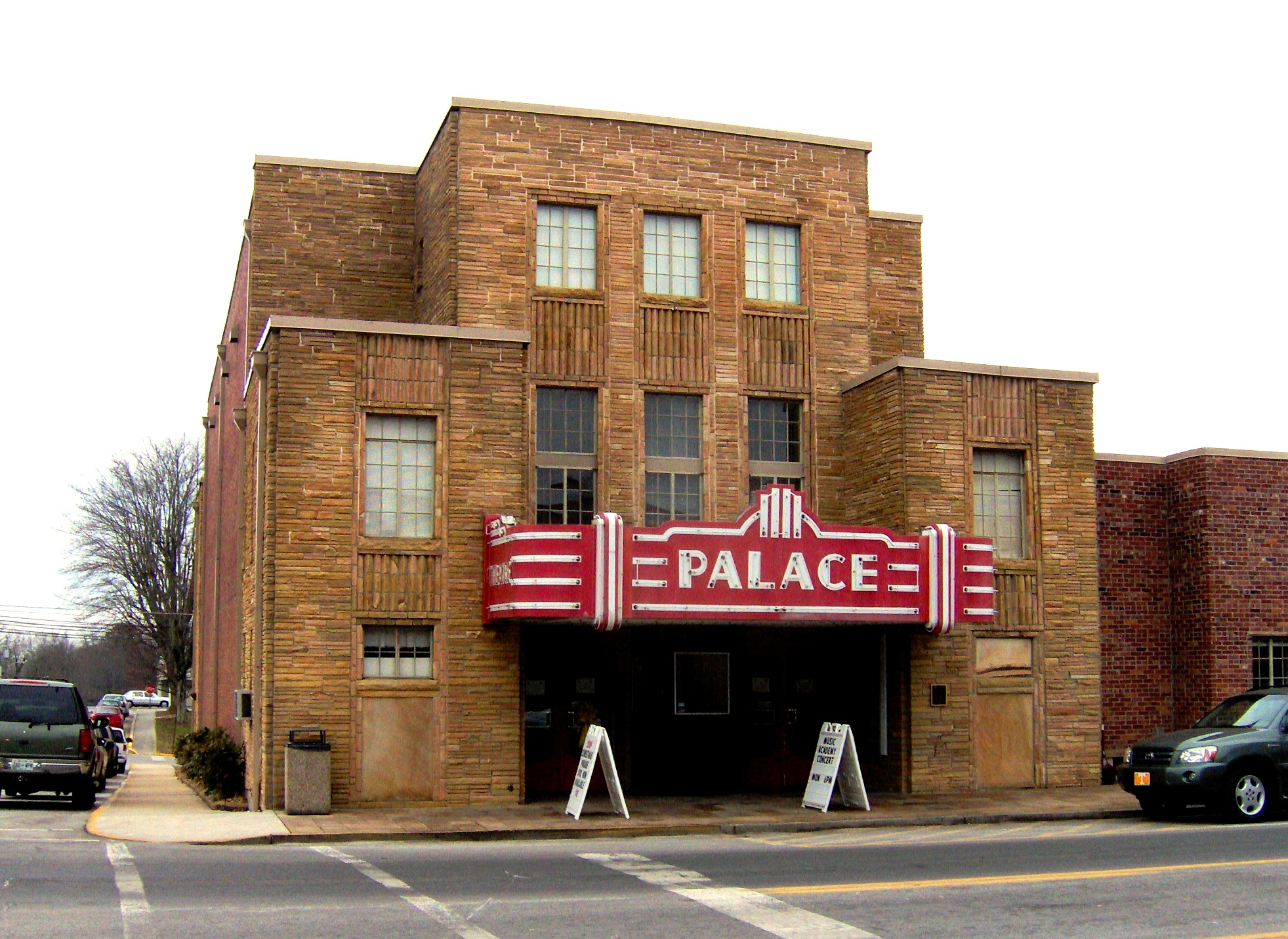
Day

The Palace Theater at 210 N. Main St. in Crossville, Tennessee is a historic movie theater built in the 1930s.

== Architecture ==
The building design embodies the Art Deco and Moderne styles. The exterior is faced with Crab Orchard stone laid in patterns characteristic of Art Deco. The neon-illuminated marquee and bulls-eye wall sconces in the interior are other characteristic elements of these styles. The auditorium seated about 600 people.

== History ==
The Palace Theater opened in November 1938 with a screening of If I Were King, featuring Ronald Colman. It operated as a first-run theater until the 1970s, but closed in 1978 when a new two-screen theater opened in Crossville. The building was vacant for many years, while its physical condition deteriorated.

The Palace was among the movie theaters featured in the 1987 book Great American Movie Theaters by architectural historian David Naylor. A subsequent citizen campaign for its preservation led to the city of Crossville purchasing the building in 1993. The theater building was listed on the National Register of Historic Places in 1994 and was later restored with public financial support. It now serves as a multipurpose community auditorium.
