= Istre Cemetery Grave Houses =

- U.S. National Register of Historic Places
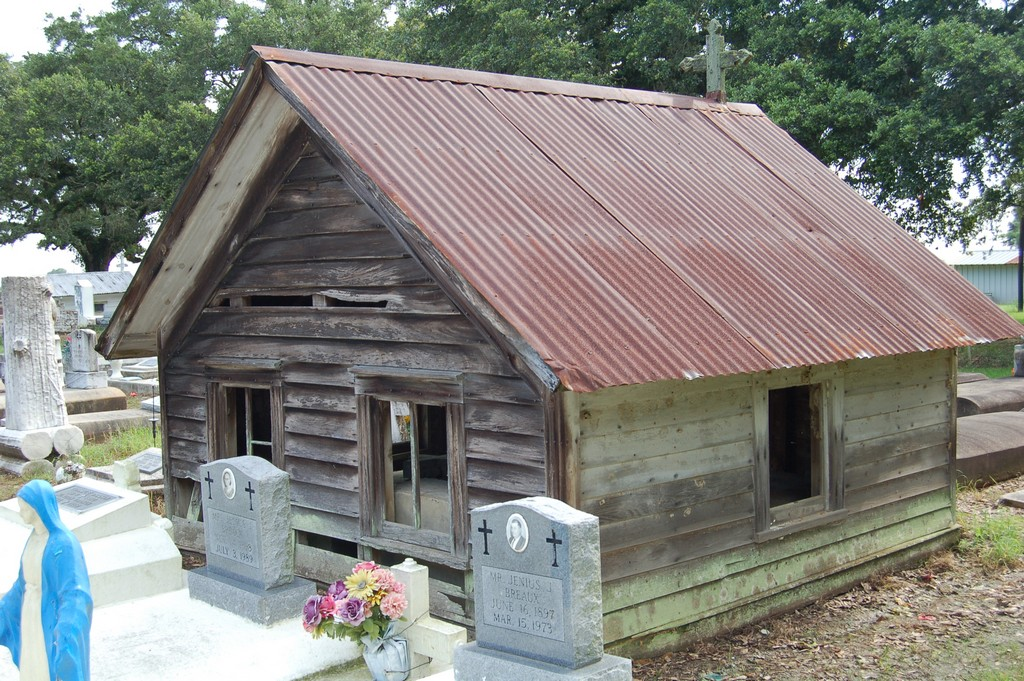
- The LeBlanc Grave House before the family began restoration efforts.

- Location within Louisiana Location within the United States
- Location: Along Swift Road, about 0.68 miles (1.09 km) south of intersection with Legros Road
- Nearest city: Morse, Louisiana
- Coordinates: 30°06′56″N 92°33′55″W
- Area: 0.2 acres (0.081 ha)
- Built: ca. 1900, 1925 and 1935
- Built by: LeBlanc, Henry & Istre families
- NRHP reference No.: 07000545
- Added to NRHP: February 21, 2008

The Istre Cemetery Grave Houses are three historic grave houses located in Istre Cemetery in Morse, Louisiana. The houses are the only three known surviving examples of traditional Acadiana grave houses. The structures were built in 1925 (Istre Grave House), 1935 (Henry Grave House), and circa 1900 (LeBlanc Grave House); they each resemble a small gable-roofed house.

It is important to distinguish between grave shelters and grave houses. Shelters, common in Protestant southern cemeteries, are primarily built with a roof, four corner posts and a fence protecting an in-ground burial site. Grave houses are complete, miniature houses with siding, hinged doors, windows and sometimes ornate interiors.

No one knows why the Cajun Catholic settlers in the Acadiana Prairie region of south Louisiana began building grave houses. There are numerous legends about how the tradition started. The significance of the grave houses is uncertain; historians have variously proposed that the houses were a form of protection or a local interpretation of burial vaults. The houses resemble the grave shelters of the Upland South, another burial tradition with obscure origins, and some researchers have suggested that the former practice derives from the latter.

Local filmmakers Zach, Donny and Jeremy C. Broussard released their historical documentary Little Houses in 2009. The film documents the mystery of the houses, their historical significance and the filmmakers' efforts to have them listed on the National Register of Historic Places. Locals estimate that at least forty grave houses once stood in the Istre Cemetery alone and twelve remained in Istre Cemetery as recently as the 1980s. Today only three original houses remain. Since the film's release, a fourth house has been built by Leonard Smith, a local resident and caretaker of the cemetery.

The grave houses were added to the National Register of Historic Places on February 21, 2008.
