= Thomas Shadden =

American politician

Thomas Raymond Shadden (January 17, 1920 – April 22, 2000) was an American politician, who served as a member of the Tennessee House of Representatives, as a member of the Tennessee State Senate, and as mayor of Crossville, Tennessee.

== Early life ==
Shadden was born in Morgan County, Tennessee.

== Military service ==
Shadden served in the U.S. Army during World War II.
