= Palace Theater (Kinsley, Kansas) =

- U.S. National Register of Historic Places
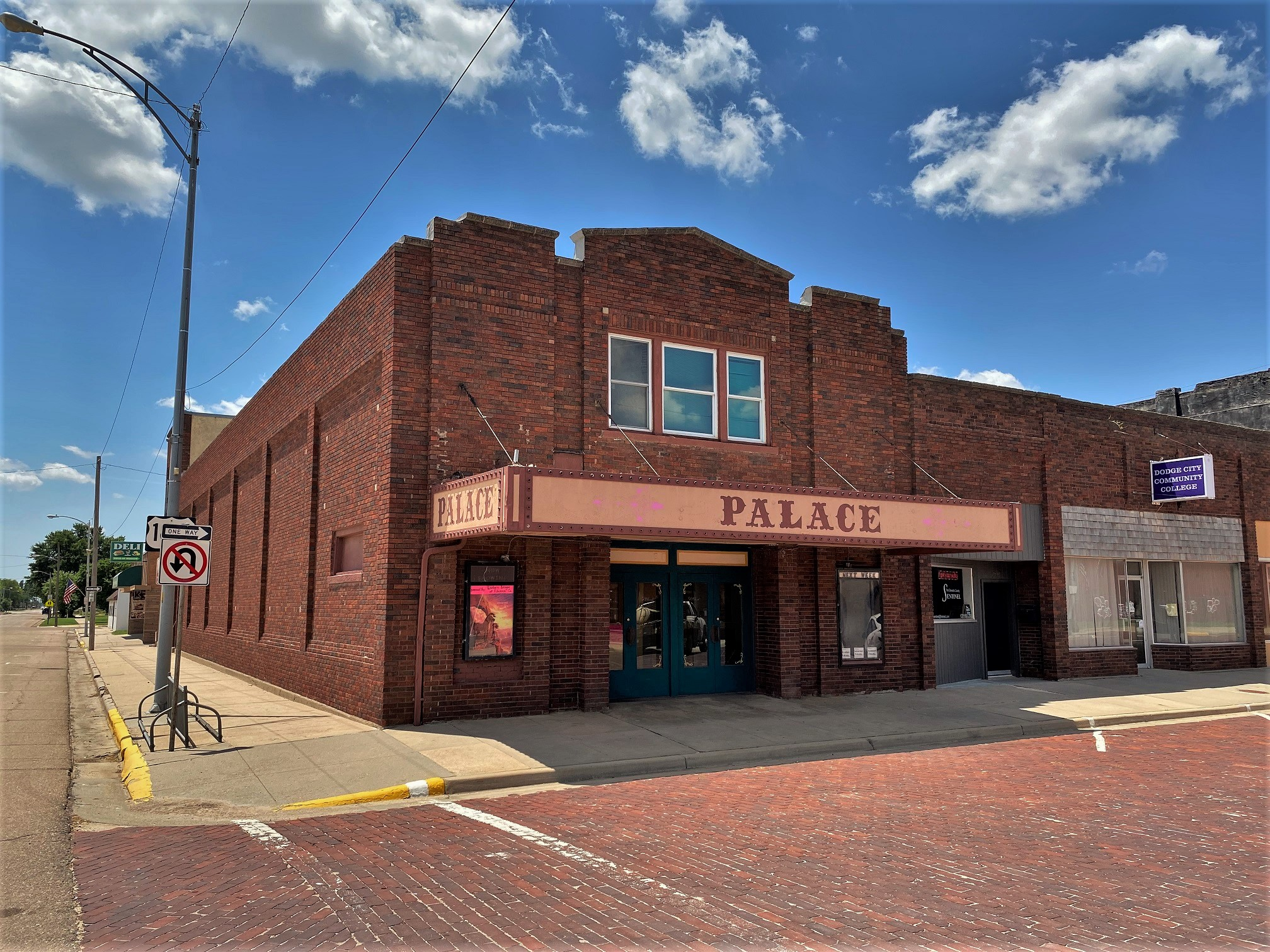
- The Palace Theater in 2021

- Location within Kansas Location within the United States
- Location: 222 E. 6th St. Kinsley, Kansas
- Coordinates: 37°55′29″N 99°24′37″W
- Area: Less than one acre
- Built: 1917
- Built by: William Harwood; Roy Hatfield
- Architectural style: Early Commercial
- MPS: Theaters and Opera Houses of Kansas MPS
- NRHP reference No.: 05000006
- Added to NRHP: February 9, 2005

The Palace Theater in Kinsley, Kansas, is located at 222 E. 6th St. at the intersection of 6th and Niles Avenue (U.S. Highway 183), in the heart of Kinsely's historic commercial district, and was built in 1917. It was listed on the National Register of Historic Places in 2005.

It is a two-part commercial block building with dark brown brick walls. It is 33 by 150 feet (10 m × 46 m) in plan.
