= Palace Theatre (Jonesboro, Louisiana) =

- U.S. National Register of Historic Places
- Location within Louisiana Location within the United States
- Location: 125 Jimmy Davis Boulevard, Jonesboro, Louisiana
- Coordinates: 32°14′26″N 92°42′52″W
- Area: less than one acre
- Built: 1929
- Architectural style: Art Deco, Mission/Spanish Revival
- NRHP reference No.: 08000731
- Added to NRHP: July 30, 2008

The Palace Theatre is a historic building located at 125 Jimmy Davis Boulevard in Jonesboro, Louisiana.

Built before 1924 as a brick building, it was remodelled with a stucco facade and in 1929. The renovation included a mixture of Art Deco and Spanish Colonial Revival styling.

It was deemed notable "as the only professional entertainment venue in Jonesboro, the seat of Jackson Parish" and "as one of the parish’s very limited number of architectural landmarks."

The theatre was listed on the National Register of Historic Places on July 30, 2008.

== See also ==
- National Register of Historic Places listings in Jackson Parish, Louisiana
