= Old Town Cemetery (Claiborne Parish, Louisiana) =

Cemetery in Haynesville, Claiborne Parish, Louisiana

Coordinates: 32°56′18″N 93°08′21″W

- Interactive map of Old Town Cemetery

Details
- Location: Haynesville, Louisiana
- No. of graves: Approximately 3,000

Old Town Cemetery, also known as Old Taylor Cemetery and Old Haynesville Cemetery, is a cemetery located south of Haynesville, in Claiborne Parish, Louisiana, United States. The cemetery used to be located near the old town center for Haynesville, however the town center moved 2 miles east with the arrival of new train tracks which left this old town area as a "ghost town".

The cemetery contains some 3,000 burials. Fashion designer Geoffrey Beene (1924–2004) is buried there.
