= Turnage Theatre =

Historic theater in North Carolina

Coordinates: 35°32′34″N 77°03′22″W

== Introduction ==
The Turnage Theatre is a historic performing-arts complex at 150 West Main Street in Washington, North Carolina. The building contains two historic entertainment spaces: an upstairs vaudeville theater dating to 1913 and a movie palace added around 1930. It is a contributing property in the Washington Historic District and is operated by Arts of the Pamlico, formerly the Beaufort County Arts Council.

== Early History ==
The upstairs venue, originally called the New Theatre, opening in 1913 in the Hodges Building. Its opening was delayed by damange from the hurricane of 1913. The theatre presented vaudeville acts, musical revues, and community performances. C.A. Turnage acquired an interest in the theater in 1914, and the complex was later named for him.

As motion pictures became more popular, the New Theatre began presenting films. Its first taking picture was reportedly On Trial, shown in March 1929. Construction subsequently began on a larger palace-stlye theater behind the original building. The new auditorium opening on February 27, 1930, with the musical film Lord Byron of Broadway. The older vaudeville theatre remained above the Main Street storefronts

== Closure and Restoration ==
Turnage operated the theatre until 1955, when it was sold to the Stewart and Everett Theatre Company. The venue continued showing films until the late 1970s, when competition from suburban multiplexes and the decline of downtown businesses contributed to its closure.

Community preservation advocates formed the Turnage Theatre Foundation during the 1990s. After an extensive restoration, the theater reopened in 2007. Financial difficulties forced it to close again in 2011. In 2013, the Beaufort County Arts Council purchased the property for $250,000 and subsequently began operating as Arts of the Pamlico.

== Architecture and Preservation ==
The complex's distinguishing feature is the survival of two entertainment venues from different periods under one roof. The upstairs vaudeville theater retains historic features including its sloped wooden floor, balcony, stage, piano pit, catwalk, curtain mechanisms, and the an early horn speaker. The rear auditorium represents the movie-palace era and continues to serve as the principal performance space.

The building contributes to the Washington Historic District. In 2020, a $1.3 million preservation project replaced the deteriorated timber-supported roof over the vaudeville theater with a new steel structure an included additional interior repairs.

== Present Use ==
Arts of the Pamlico uses the Turnage as a regional arts center. The complex hosts live music, theatrical productions, films, exhibitions workshops, youth arts education, and community programs. It also contains gallery, studio, retail, and support spaces.
