= Chatham, Louisiana =

- Town
- Town of Chatham
- Motto: "Gateway to Caney Lake"
- Location of Chatham in Jackson Parish, Louisiana.

- Location of Louisiana in the United States
- Coordinates: 32°18′34″N 92°27′07″W
- Country: United States
- State: Louisiana
- Parish: Jackson

Area
  - Total: 1.15 sq mi (2.98 km^{2})
  - Land: 0.99 sq mi (2.56 km^{2})
  - Water: 0.16 sq mi (0.42 km^{2})
- Elevation: 171 ft (52 m)

Population (2020)
  - Total: 491
  - Density: 496.9/sq mi (191.86/km^{2})
- Time zone: UTC-6 (CST)
  - Summer (DST): UTC-5 (CDT)
- Area code: 318
- FIPS code: 22-14485
- GNIS feature ID: 2406258
- Website: Town of Chatham, Louisiana

Chatham is a town in Jackson Parish, Louisiana, United States. The population was 491 in 2020. It is part of the Ruston micropolitan statistical area.

Southwest of Chatham is Caney Lake and the Jimmie Davis State Park.

== Geography ==
According to the United States Census Bureau, the town has a total area of 1.1 square miles (2.8 km^{2}), of which 1.0 square mile (2.6 km^{2}) is land and 0.2 square miles (0.52 km^{2}) (13.91%) is water.

== Demographics ==
Historical population
| Census | Pop. | Note | %± |
|---|---|---|---|
| 1910 | 181 | | — |
| 1920 | 186 | | 2.8% |
| 1930 | 391 | | 110.2% |
| 1940 | 605 | | 54.7% |
| 1950 | 833 | | 37.7% |
| 1960 | 758 | | −9.0% |
| 1970 | 827 | | 9.1% |
| 1980 | 714 | | −13.7% |
| 1990 | 617 | | −13.6% |
| 2000 | 623 | | 1.0% |
| 2010 | 557 | | −10.6% |
| 2020 | 491 | | −11.8% |
| 2025 (est.) | 515 | ▲ | 4.9% |
U.S. Decennial Census

Chatham racial composition as of 2020
| Race | Number | Percentage |
|---|---|---|
| White (non-Hispanic) | 272 | 55.4% |
| Black or African American (non-Hispanic) | 185 | 37.68% |
| Native American | 5 | 1.02% |
| Asian | 3 | 0.61% |
| Other/Mixed | 16 | 3.26% |
| Hispanic or Latino | 10 | 2.04% |

As of the 2020 United States census, there were 491 people, 316 households, and 157 families residing in the town.
