= National Register of Historic Places listings in Tennessee =

There are over 2,000 properties and historic districts in Tennessee that are listed on the United States National Register of Historic Places, distributed among all of the state's 95 counties. Of these, 29 are National Historic Landmarks.

The Tennessee Historical Commission, which manages the state's participation in the National Register program, reports that 80 percent of the state's area has been surveyed for historic buildings. Surveys for archaeological sites have been less extensive; coverage is estimated less than 5 percent of the state. Not all properties that have been determined to be eligible for National Register are listed.

The locations of National Register properties and districts (at least for all showing latitude and longitude coordinates below), may be seen in an online map by clicking on "Map of all coordinates".

Contents: Counties in Tennessee
Anderson – Bedford – Benton – Bledsoe – Blount – Bradley – Campbell – Cannon – Carroll – Carter – Cheatham – Chester – Claiborne – Clay – Cocke – Coffee – Crockett – Cumberland – Davidson – Decatur – DeKalb – Dickson – Dyer – Fayette – Fentress – Franklin – Gibson – Giles – Grainger – Greene – Grundy – Hamblen – Hamilton – Hancock – Hardeman – Hardin – Hawkins – Haywood – Henderson – Henry – Hickman – Houston – Humphreys – Jackson – Jefferson – Johnson – Knox – Lake – Lauderdale – Lawrence – Lewis – Lincoln – Loudon – Macon – Madison – Marion – Marshall – Maury – McMinn – McNairy – Meigs – Monroe – Montgomery – Moore – Morgan – Obion – Overton – Perry – Pickett – Polk – Putnam – Rhea – Roane – Robertson – Rutherford – Scott – Sequatchie – Sevier – Shelby – Smith – Stewart – Sullivan – Sumner – Tipton – Trousdale – Unicoi – Union – Van Buren – Warren – Washington – Wayne – Weakley – White – Williamson – Wilson

This National Park Service list is complete through NPS recent listings posted November 6, 2026.

== Listings by county ==
The following are approximate tallies of current listings by county. These counts are based on entries in the National Register Information Database as of April 24, 2008 and new weekly listings posted since then on the National Register of Historic Places web site. There are frequent additions to the listings and occasional delistings and the counts here are approximate and not official. New entries are added to the official Register on a weekly basis. Also, the counts in this table exclude boundary increase and decrease listings which only modify the area covered by an existing property or district, although carrying a separate National Register reference number.

The Tennessee county with the largest number of National Register listings is Davidson County, site of the state capital, Nashville.

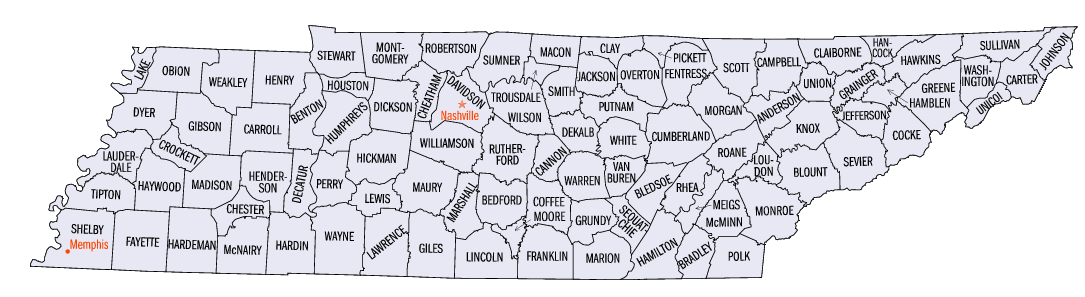
Tennessee's counties

	County	# of Sites
1	Anderson	20
2	Bedford	33
3	Benton	3
4	Bledsoe	9
5	Blount	74
6	Bradley	24
7	Campbell	8
8	Cannon	10
9	Carroll	6
10	Carter	13
11	Cheatham	8
12	Chester	4
13	Claiborne	15
14	Clay	2
15	Cocke	14
16	Coffee	16
17	Crockett	3
18	Cumberland	9
19	Davidson	203
20	Decatur	5
21	DeKalb	5
22	Dickson	23
23	Dyer	10
24	Fayette	14
25	Fentress	12
26	Franklin	22
27	Gibson	19
28	Giles	33
29	Grainger	9
30	Greene	17
31	Grundy	22
32	Hamblen	15
33	Hamilton	113
34	Hancock	1
35	Hardeman	12
36	Hardin	9
37	Hawkins	12
38	Haywood	17
39	Henderson	5
40	Henry	15
41	Hickman	11
42	Houston	3
43	Humphreys	10
44	Jackson	7
45	Jefferson	14
46	Johnson	8
47	Knox	118
48	Lake	1
49	Lauderdale	7
50	Lawrence	15
51	Lewis	7
52	Lincoln	18
53	Loudon	24
54	Macon	6
55	Madison	30
56	Marion	18
57	Marshall	23
58	Maury	70
59	McMinn	19
60	McNairy	4
61	Meigs	37
62	Monroe	22
63	Montgomery	54
64	Moore	7
65	Morgan	5
66	Obion	16
67	Overton	7
68	Perry	6
69	Pickett	3
70	Polk	18
71	Putnam	16
72	Rhea	8
73	Roane	20
74	Robertson	29
75	Rutherford	48
76	Scott	8
77	Sequatchie	6
78	Sevier	37
79	Shelby	206
80	Smith	13
81	Stewart	16
82	Sullivan	46
83	Sumner	38
84	Tipton	14
85	Trousdale	7
86	Unicoi	5
87	Union	7
88	Van Buren	4
89	Warren	23
90	Washington	36
91	Wayne	10
92	Weakley	12
93	White	12
94	Williamson	132
95	Wilson	25
(duplicates)		(22)
Total:		2,201

== Benton County ==
	Name on the Register	Image	Date listed	Location	City or town	Description
1	Reynoldsburg-Paris Road		August 7, 2005 (#05000803)	5.0 miles northeast of Camden off Chestnut Hill Rd. 36°06′00″N 87°58′36″W	Camden	A Trail of Tears site
2	William Thompson House	William Thompson House	May 6, 1976 (#76001763)	South of Camden, off State Route 69; 36°02′24″N 88°05′37″W	Camden	
3	US Post Office	US Post Office	September 23, 1988 (#88001577)	81 N. Forest St. 36°03′30″N 88°05′49″W	Camden	

=== Former listings ===
	Name on the Register	Image	Date listed	Date removed	Location	City or town	Description
1	Mount Zion Church		October 2, 1973 (#73001752)	July 17, 2012	5.5 miles southeast of Big Sandy; 36°10′41″N 88°01′10″W	Big Sandy	Destroyed by arsonist.
2	John Rushing Farm		December 17, 1999 (#99001587)	June 10, 2022	5760 N. State Route 69A; 36°08′00″N 88°06′15″W	Camden	

== Bledsoe County ==
	Name on the Register	Image	Date listed	Location	City or town	Description
1	Bellview School	Bellview School	March 5, 1999 (#99000279)	State Route 101; 35°44′44″N 85°10′42″W	Pikeville	Rural schoolhouse built in 1928; now used as a community center
2	Bledsoe County Courthouse	Bledsoe County Courthouse	March 30, 1995 (#95000346)	Town Sq. 35°36′20″N 85°11′19″W	Pikeville	
3	Bledsoe County Jail	Bledsoe County Jail	November 12, 2008 (#08001049)	128 Frazier St. 35°36′16″N 85°11′17″W	Pikeville	Still serves as the county's jail
4	John Bridgman House	John Bridgman House	June 24, 1993 (#93000567)	106 E. Spring St. 35°36′06″N 85°10′59″W	Pikeville	Federal-style house built in 1815
5	Fall Creek Falls Fire Lookout Tower	Fall Creek Falls Fire Lookout Tower	July 21, 2015 (#15000444)	Fire Tower Rd. 35°40′10″N 85°18′23″W	Pikeville vicinity	
6	Lincoln School	Lincoln School	July 15, 1993 (#93000648)	Old State Route 28 near Rockford Rd. 35°36′44″N 85°11′26″W	Pikeville	A Rosenwald school built in the 1920s
7	Pikeville Chapel African Methodist Episcopal Zion Church	Pikeville Chapel African Methodist Episcopal Zion Church	November 30, 1999 (#99001444)	E. Valley Dr. 35°36′18″N 85°11′08″W	Pikeville	Originally a Freedmen's Bureau school built in 1870; converted to AME Zion church in 1888
8	Dr. James A. Ross House	Dr. James A. Ross House	June 25, 1999 (#99000758)	102 Frazier St. 35°36′20″N 85°11′16″W	Pikeville	Home and office of Dr. James Ross, built c. 1872; now home to the Museum of Bledsoe County History
9	South Main Street Historic District	South Main Street Historic District	April 21, 1994 (#94000375)	200-422 S. Main St;. 35°36′06″N 85°11′25″W	Pikeville	

== Campbell County ==
	Name on the Register	Image	Date listed	Location	City or town	Description
1	Jellico Commercial Historic District	Jellico Commercial Historic District	November 12, 1999 (#99001344)	Roughly along North and South Main Sts. 36°35′15″N 84°07′44″W	Jellico	Includes several buildings mostly along North Main and South Main
2	Kincaid-Howard House	Kincaid-Howard House	March 16, 1976 (#76001766)	State Route 63; 36°24′32″N 84°03′04″W	Fincastle	Built in 1845 by John Kincaid II; Nomination form: https://npgallery.nps.gov/NRHP/GetAsset/NRHP/76001766_text
3	LaFollette Coke Ovens	LaFollette Coke Ovens	November 29, 2016 (#16000811)	Ivydale & Water Plant Rds., Coke Oven Ln. 36°23′45″N 84°07′40″W	LaFollette	
4	LaFollette House	LaFollette House	May 29, 1975 (#75001736)	Indiana Ave. 36°23′01″N 84°07′06″W	LaFollette	Also known as "Glen Oaks"; built c. 1895 by Harvey LaFollette; designed by George F. Barber
5	Norris Hydroelectric Project	Norris Hydroelectric Project	April 12, 2016 (#16000165)	300 Powerhouse Way; 36°13′27″N 84°05′32″W	Norris	Extends into Anderson County
6	A.E. Perkins House	A.E. Perkins House	December 8, 1997 (#97001529)	130 Valley St. 36°19′55″N 84°10′50″W	Jacksboro	
7	Smith-Little-Mars House	Smith-Little-Mars House	November 7, 1976 (#76001767)	West of Speedwell on State Route 63; 36°26′41″N 83°55′45″W	Speedwell vicinity	https://npgallery.nps.gov/NRHP/GetAsset/NRHP/76001767_text
8	U.S. Post Office and Mine Rescue Station	U.S. Post Office and Mine Rescue Station	February 10, 1984 (#84003467)	368 N. Main St. 36°35′23″N 84°07′34″W	Jellico	

== Cannon County ==
	Name on the Register	Image	Date listed	Location	City or town	Description
1	Baptist Female College-Adams House	Baptist Female College-Adams House	June 25, 1987 (#87001035)	210 S. College St. 35°49′34″N 86°04′31″W	Woodbury	Built in 1859 as a dormitory for the Baptist Female College, used as a house by Dr. J.E. Adams in the 20th century
2	Auburntown High School Gym		July 8, 2022 (#100007915)	150 Vantrease Ave. 35°56′43″N 86°05′52″W	Auburntown	
3	Bank of Auburn		April 28, 2026 (#100012589)	73 East Main Street; 35°56′54″N 86°05′45″W	Auburntown	
4	Brevard-Macon House	Brevard-Macon House	December 23, 1994 (#94001491)	902 W. Main St. 35°49′37″N 86°04′56″W	Woodbury	Built in 1900 by William F. Brevard; still owned by his descendants
5	Brown-Hancock House	Brown-Hancock House	May 7, 2019 (#100003901)	110 W. Water St. 35°49′43″N 86°04′11″W	Woodbury	
6	Cannon County Courthouse	Cannon County Courthouse	April 14, 1992 (#92000347)	Court Sq. 35°49′42″N 86°04′15″W	Woodbury	Built in 1935; designed by George Waller
7	William Cannon Houston House	William Cannon Houston House	June 16, 1989 (#89000503)	107 Houston Ln. 35°49′30″N 86°03′30″W	Woodbury	
8	The Meltons Bank		July 3, 2023 (#100009095)	229 Gassaway Main St. 35°56′22″N 85°59′45″W	Liberty vicinity	
9	Ready-Cates Farm	Ready-Cates Farm	July 27, 2005 (#05000760)	1662 Northcutt Rd. 35°53′22″N 86°07′45″W	Milton	Established 1840s by Abner Alexander; includes circa-1870 house
10	Rucker-Mason Farm		January 9, 2007 (#06001234)	837 Hare Ln. 35°54′13″N 86°08′40″W	Porterfield	

=== Former listings ===
	Name on the Register	Image	Date listed	Date removed	Location	City or town	Description
1	Readyville Mill	Readyville Mill	July 2, 1973 (#73001753)	November 4, 2024	On U.S. Route 70S; 35°49′48″N 86°10′35″W	Readyville	

== Carroll County ==
	Name on the Register	Image	Date listed	Location	City or town	Description
1	Court Theatre	Court Theatre	March 12, 2012 (#12000115)	155 Court Sq. 36°00′04″N 88°25′42″W	Huntingdon	
2	First Cumberland Presbyterian Church-McKenzie		June 17, 1993 (#93000476)	647 Stonewall Street North; 36°08′00″N 88°31′13″W	McKenzie	
3	Leach Fire Lookout Tower		November 14, 2017 (#100001821)	RT 1 Leach Rd. 35°54′47″N 88°28′49″W	Cedar Grove	
4	Long Rock Methodist Episcopal Church, South	Long Rock Methodist Episcopal Church, South	July 16, 2010 (#10000466)	340 Long Rock Church Rd. 36°02′59″N 88°24′03″W	Huntingdon vicinity	
5	McKenzie Depot	McKenzie Depot	March 28, 1996 (#96000336)	85 E. Bruce St. 36°07′52″N 88°31′09″W	McKenzie	
6	Webb Public School		May 10, 2024 (#100010300)	938 Walnut Avenue West; 36°07′52″N 88°31′54″W	McKenzie	

=== Former listing ===
	Name on the Register	Image	Date listed	Date removed	Location	City or town	Description
1	Hillsman House		March 25, 1982 (#82003955)	June 10, 2022	Old Hinkledale-McKenzie Rd. 36°02′23″N 88°36′44″W	Trezevant	

== Cheatham County ==
	Name on the Register	Image	Date listed	Location	City or town	Description
1	Cheatham County Courthouse	Cheatham County Courthouse	December 12, 1976 (#76001769)	Court Sq. 36°16′29″N 87°03′49″W	Ashland City	
2	Indian Town Bluff		August 30, 1974 (#74001904)	Address Restricted	Ashland City	
3	Kingston Springs Hotel and Buildings	Kingston Springs Hotel and Buildings	October 31, 1979 (#79002417)	Kingston Springs Rd. 36°05′41″N 87°06′48″W	Kingston Springs	
4	Montgomery Bell Tunnel	Montgomery Bell Tunnel	April 19, 1994 (#94001188)	Junction of the Harpeth River and Bell Bend Rd. 36°08′49″N 87°07′19″W	White Bluff	
5	Mound Bottom	Mound Bottom	September 3, 1971 (#71000813)	Along the Harpeth River below Kingston Springs, in Harpeth River State Park; 36°08′24″N 87°06′05″W	Kingston Springs	
6	Patterson Forge (40CH87)		April 16, 1971 (#71000814)	Address Restricted	Kingston Springs	
7	Sycamore Mills Site	Sycamore Mills Site	July 9, 1979 (#79002416)	Address Restricted; 36°19′14″N 87°03′06″W	Ashland City	
8	Turnbull Forge (40CH97)		July 20, 1988 (#88001108)	Address Restricted	Kingston Springs	

== Chester County ==
	Name on the Register	Image	Date listed	Location	City or town	Description
1	Chester County Courthouse	Chester County Courthouse	March 26, 1979 (#79002418)	Court Sq. 35°26′24″N 88°38′27″W	Henderson	
2	Chester County Training School/Vincent High School		March 9, 2026 (#100012788)	524 Luray Avenue; 35°26′50″N 88°37′49″W	Henderson	
3	Hamlett-Smith House	Hamlett-Smith House	December 1, 1983 (#83004227)	Jacks Creek-Mifflin Rd. 35°29′20″N 88°31′17″W	Jacks Creek	
4	National Teacher's Normal and Business College Administration Building	National Teacher's Normal and Business College Administration Building	March 12, 2012 (#12000116)	158 E. Main St. 35°26′25″N 88°38′22″W	Henderson	

== Clay County ==
	Name on the Register	Image	Date listed	Location	City or town	Description
1	Clay County Courthouse	Clay County Courthouse	September 22, 1977 (#77001261)	State Route 52; 36°33′02″N 85°30′22″W	Celina	
2	Free Hills Rosenwald School	Free Hills Rosenwald School	November 15, 1996 (#96001360)	Free Hill Rd., east of State Route 52; 36°33′46″N 85°29′13″W	Free Hill	One of only about 30 Rosenwald schools still extant, was built to educate African Americans and used from circa 1925 to 1966.

== Crockett County ==
	Name on the Register	Image	Date listed	Location	City or town	Description
1	Bank of Alamo	Bank of Alamo	June 26, 1986 (#86001397)	103 S. Bells St. 35°47′06″N 89°07′02″W	Alamo	Built in 1912
2	Central High School		April 2, 2025 (#100011616)	142 Conley Road; 35°46′31″N 89°07′14″W	Alamo	
3	Fruitvale Historic District		November 14, 2012 (#12000943)	Along Fruitvale Rd. & Jct. with Edward Williams Rd. 35°44′49″N 89°01′50″W	Fruitvale	

== Cumberland County ==
	Name on the Register	Image	Date listed	Location	City or town	Description
1	Camp Nakanawa Wigwam	Camp Nakanawa Wigwam	November 12, 1999 (#99001345)	Camp Nakanawa Wigwam Rd. 36°03′48″N 85°11′45″W	Mayland	
2	Crossville Tennessee Highway Patrol Building	Crossville Tennessee Highway Patrol Building	April 18, 2003 (#03000281)	39 Main St. 35°56′51″N 85°01′33″W	Crossville	Currently serves as the Tennessee Native Stone Museum to commemorate the uses and history of native Crab Orchard Stone.
3	Cumberland County Courthouses	Cumberland County Courthouses	June 17, 1980 (#80003783)	Main St. 35°56′53″N 85°01′37″W	Crossville	Listing includes the current courthouse, built in 1905, and the old courthouse (currently the Military Memorial Museum), built in 1886.
4	Cumberland Homesteads Historic District	Cumberland Homesteads Historic District	September 30, 1988 (#88001593)	Roughly along County Seat and Valley Rds., Grassy Cove Rd., Deep Draw and Pigeon Ridge Rds. 35°54′22″N 84°58′58″W	Crossville	Includes several hundred houses and public buildings of 1930s-era planned community; also includes parts of Cumberland Mountain State Park
5	Cumberland Mountain School	Cumberland Mountain School	August 5, 1993 (#93000779)	Western side of Old U.S. Route 127N, 2 miles north of Crossville; 35°58′45″N 85°02′07″W	Crossville	
6	Palace Theater	Palace Theater	January 7, 1994 (#93001477)	210 N. Main St. 35°56′49″N 85°01′33″W	Crossville	Art Deco theatre built in 1936. Now used as a community center
7	Pioneer Hall	Pioneer Hall	November 21, 1978 (#78002576)	Main St. 35°58′34″N 85°11′40″W	Pleasant Hill	Once part of the Pleasant Hill Academy; now a local museum
8	"See Rock City" Barn		December 23, 2024 (#100011196)	5700 TN-68; 35°51′48″N 84°55′20″W	Crossville vicinity	
9	Greenberry Wilson House	Greenberry Wilson House	June 28, 1996 (#96000719)	E.G. Wilson Rd., 7 miles southeast of Crossville; 35°46′08″N 85°01′53″W	Burke	

== DeKalb County ==
	Name on the Register	Image	Date listed	Location	City or town	Description
1	Alexandria Cemeteries Historic District	Alexandria Cemeteries Historic District	May 30, 2002 (#02000584)	Cemetery St. 36°04′34″N 86°01′44″W	Alexandria	
2	DeKalb County Fairgrounds	DeKalb County Fairgrounds	November 29, 1995 (#95001372)	103 Fairground Rd. 36°04′41″N 86°01′55″W	Alexandria	
3	Evans Block	Evans Block	August 30, 1984 (#84003533)	101 and 103 N. 4th St. 35°57′41″N 85°48′50″W	Smithville	
4	Susie Foster Log House		July 3, 2007 (#07000665)	810 College St. 35°57′01″N 85°48′57″W	Smithville	
5	Liberty Historic District	Liberty Historic District	June 25, 1987 (#87001058)	Roughly along Main and N. Main Sts. 36°00′18″N 85°57′58″W	Liberty	

=== Former listing ===
	Name on the Register	Image	Date listed	Date removed	Location	City or town	Description
1	Caplinger-Smith House		February 12, 1980 (#80004296)	April 20, 1989	SW Temperance Hall	Temperance Hall	

== Decatur County ==
	Name on the Register	Image	Date listed	Location	City or town	Description
1	Dr. Beauregard Martin Brooks House		September 3, 1992 (#92001074)	State Route 114 (Clifton Ferry Rd.) east of its junction with State Route 69; 35°26′21″N 88°05′21″W	Bath Springs	
2	Brownsport I Furnace (40DR85)		July 28, 1988 (#88001144)	Address Restricted; 35°31′08″N 88°01′08″W	Gumdale	
3	Brownsport II Furnace (40DR86)		August 26, 1977 (#77001265)	Address Restricted	Decaturville	
4	Decatur Furnace (40DR84)		July 28, 1988 (#88001142)	Address Restricted	Bath Springs	
5	John P. Rains Hotel	John P. Rains Hotel	November 21, 1978 (#78002585)	106-108 Tennessee Ave., S. 35°38′58″N 88°07′35″W	Parsons	

== Dyer County ==
	Name on the Register	Image	Date listed	Location	City or town	Description
1	Bank of Dyersburg	Bank of Dyersburg	June 16, 1983 (#83003030)	100 N. Main St. 36°01′57″N 89°23′07″W	Dyersburg	2-story Italianate/Romanesque style bank building constructed in 1885 with a three story 1890 addition.
2	Bruce High School		July 6, 2023 (#100009096)	801 Vernon St. 36°01′28″N 89°22′40″W	Dyersburg	
3	Cole-Boston House		December 18, 2025 (#100012392)	1481 Ditmore Road; 36°06′36″N 89°14′12″W	Newbern vicinity	
4	Dyersburg Courthouse Square Historic District	Dyersburg Courthouse Square Historic District	February 28, 1991 (#91000222)	Roughly bounded by Church, Main, Cedar, and Court Sts. 36°01′48″N 89°23′02″W	Dyersburg	
5	Gordon-Oak Streets Historic District		May 8, 1992 (#92000428)	107-302 Gordon and 114-305 Oak Sts., and the western side of 711-731 Sampson Ave. 36°02′22″N 89°22′58″W	Dyersburg	
6	Edward Moody King House	Edward Moody King House	October 25, 1990 (#90001658)	512 Finley St. 36°02′03″N 89°23′27″W	Dyersburg	
7	Latta House		November 14, 1978 (#78002586)	917 Troy Ave. 36°02′31″N 89°23′06″W	Dyersburg	
8	Newbern Illinois Central Depot	Newbern Illinois Central Depot	March 25, 1993 (#93000213)	Junction of Main and Jefferson Sts. 36°06′44″N 89°15′44″W	Newbern	
9	Pleasant Hill Cemetery	Pleasant Hill Cemetery	November 13, 2003 (#03001159)	Approximately 0.7 miles west of the cattle gate at the end of Cemetery Rd. 36°02′45″N 89°29′04″W	Finley	
10	Troy Avenue Historic District	Troy Avenue Historic District	May 8, 1992 (#92000429)	827-1445 Troy Ave., western side 36°02′36″N 89°23′07″W	Dyersburg	

=== Former listing ===
	Name on the Register	Image	Date listed	Date removed	Location	City or town	Description
1	Dyersburg Sanatarium		September 8, 1976 (#76002241)	December 9, 1976	124 McGaughey	Dyersburg	Demolished.

== Hancock County ==
	Name on the Register	Image	Date listed	Location	City or town	Description
1	Vardy School Community Historic District	Vardy School Community Historic District	November 8, 1984 (#84000373)	Blackwater Rd. 36°35′03″N 83°11′19″W	Sneedville	The school has collapsed, but other structures in the district intact and preserved.

=== Former listings ===
	Name on the Register	Image	Date listed	Date removed	Location	City or town	Description
1	Old Jail	Old Jail	April 11, 1973 (#73001784)	March 12, 2026	236 Jail St. 36°31′46″N 83°13′00″W	Sneedville	

== Hardin County ==
	Name on the Register	Image	Date listed	Location	City or town	Description
1	Arch Bridge	Arch Bridge	July 20, 2020 (#100005375)	2221 US-64; 35°16′37″N 88°01′19″W	Olive Hill	
2	Cherry Mansion	Cherry Mansion	August 16, 1977 (#77001274)	101 Main St. 35°13′32″N 88°15′24″W	Savannah	
3	James Graham House	James Graham House	October 29, 1991 (#91001594)	2221 Airport Rd. 35°09′39″N 88°13′02″W	Savannah	
4	Pickwick Landing Hydroelectric Project	Pickwick Landing Hydroelectric Project	August 11, 2017 (#100001467)	850 Carolina Ln. 35°03′50″N 88°14′50″W	Counce	
5	Savannah Historic District	Savannah Historic District	April 2, 1980 (#80003832)	Irregular pattern along Main, Deford, Guinn, Church, College, Williams and Cook Sts.; also 410 and 506 Main St.; also roughly bounded by College St., Main St., Tennessee St., and Williams St. 35°13′38″N 88°14′59″W	Savannah	410/506 Main St. represent a boundary increase of November 8, 1993; "roughly bounded" represent a boundary increase of August 7, 2009
6	Shiloh Indian Mounds Site	Shiloh Indian Mounds Site	April 27, 1979 (#79000279)	East of Hurley in Shiloh National Military Park; 35°08′32″N 88°19′26″W	Hurley	
7	Shiloh National Military Park	Shiloh National Military Park	October 15, 1966 (#66000074)	Off State Route 22; 35°08′22″N 88°20′35″W	Pittsburg Landing	
8	Tanyard Branch Furnace (40HR121)		April 9, 1988 (#88000250)	Address Restricted	Bath Springs	
9	Meady White House	Meady White House	July 1, 1993 (#93000586)	47915 Main St. 35°22′39″N 88°12′31″W	Saltillo	

== Henderson County ==
	Name on the Register	Image	Date listed	Location	City or town	Description
1	Doe Creek School		November 29, 2010 (#10000935)	Doe Creek Rd., approximately ½ mile north of Dyer Rd. 35°28′11″N 88°14′51″W	Sardis	
2	Thompsie Edwards House	Thompsie Edwards House	June 30, 1983 (#83003039)	113 Main St. 35°38′53″N 88°23′30″W	Lexington	
3	Montgomery High School	Montgomery High School	July 3, 2007 (#07000662)	Montgomery Ave. 35°39′02″N 88°23′59″W	Lexington	
4	Mount Pisgah Missionary Baptist Church and Cemetery		November 19, 2014 (#14000942)	3435 Scarce Creek Rd. 35°45′40″N 88°19′59″W	Wildersville vicinity	
5	Parker's Crossroads Battlefield	Parker's Crossroads Battlefield	February 22, 1999 (#97001550)	State Route 22, 26 miles east of Jackson; 35°47′33″N 88°23′40″W	Parkers Crossroads	

== Houston County ==
	Name on the Register	Image	Date listed	Location	City or town	Description
1	Erin Limekilns	Erin Limekilns	November 10, 2004 (#04001230)	708 McMillan St. 36°18′57″N 87°42′52″W	Erin	
2	V.R. Harris House	V.R. Harris House	August 18, 1983 (#83003040)	Main St. 36°19′01″N 87°42′04″W	Erin	
3	Quarry Limekiln	Quarry Limekiln	November 10, 2004 (#04001229)	State Route 49, approximately 0.25 miles east of Denmark Rd. 36°19′01″N 87°42′44″W	Erin	

== Jackson County ==
	Name on the Register	Image	Date listed	Location	City or town	Description
1	Carverdale Farms	Carverdale Farms	July 31, 2018 (#100002754)	112 Harris Hollow Rd. 36°16′29″N 85°45′21″W	Granville	Farm first settled in 1830 by Joseph Williamson and family in the small community of Liberty just east of Granville. Historic home built in 1850 by Andrew Jackson Vantrease. Samuel Sampson Carver purchased property in 1890, operating a saw mill, blacksmith shop, and general store in addition to his agricultural uses. Farm was used for maneuver training during World War II. On October 24, 1955, current owner and great grandson of Carver, Joe Moore, was featured on the cover of Time magazine after being named 1955 Star Farmer of America. Contributing buildings range in construction dates from 1830 to 1945.
2	Flynn's Lick Methodist Church		March 23, 2026 (#100012839)	2577 Granville Highway; 36°19′40″N 85°42′49″W	Gainesboro	
3	Fort Blount-Williamsburg Site	Fort Blount-Williamsburg Site	July 17, 1974 (#74001918)	On the Cumberland River south of Gainesboro; 36°19′09″N 85°45′05″W	Gainesboro	Site of Fort Blount (1794-1798) and later town of Williamsburg (founded 1807)
4	Gainesboro Historic District	Gainesboro Historic District	October 25, 1990 (#90001570)	Roughly bounded by Cox, Minor, Montpelier, and Mark Twain Sts. 36°21′19″N 85°39′29″W	Gainesboro	
5	Gainesboro Residential Historic District	Gainesboro Residential Historic District	July 11, 2001 (#01000728)	Roughly along Dixie Ave. and Cox, Minor, and N. Murray Sts. 36°21′24″N 85°39′30″W	Gainesboro	
6	Jackson County High School	Jackson County High School	July 8, 2009 (#09000535)	707 School Dr. 36°20′49″N 85°39′26″W	Gainesboro	
7	T.B. Sutton General Store	T.B. Sutton General Store	May 7, 2019 (#100003902)	169 Clover St. 36°16′18″N 85°47′50″W	Granville	Constructed in 1880, Sutton Store is the oldest remaining commercial institution in Granville. The store sat empty for approximately thirty years before Harold and Beverley Sutton (no relation to T.B. Sutton) purchased and restored the building. In 2007, they donated the building to Historic Granville Incorporated who continue to operate the building as a general store, restaurant, and music venue. Sutton Store has been recently recognized by Country Living and Taste of the South magazines as one of the must see general stores in America.

== Johnson County ==
	Name on the Register	Image	Date listed	Location	City or town	Description
1	Butler House	Butler House	April 11, 1973 (#73001798)	309 N. Church St. 36°28′19″N 81°48′07″W	Mountain City	Home of Congressman Roderick R. Butler, built circa 1870.
2	Johnson County Courthouse	Johnson County Courthouse	November 12, 2026 (#100013595)	222 W. Main Street; 36°28′31″N 81°48′23″W	Mountain City	
3	Alfred Johnson Farm	Alfred Johnson Farm	July 1, 1998 (#98000820)	825 Johnson Hollow Rd. 36°29′40″N 81°47′59″W	Mountain City	
4	Kettlefoot Fire Lookout Tower	Kettlefoot Fire Lookout Tower	November 20, 2015 (#15000833)	Fire Tower Rd. 36°25′36″N 81°52′00″W	Mountain City	
5	Maymead Farm	Maymead Farm	February 15, 2012 (#11000100)	1995 Roan Creek Rd. 36°25′36″N 81°49′11″W	Mountain City	
6	Morrison Farm and Store	Morrison Farm and Store	April 11, 1973 (#73001797)	State Route 91: specifically, 6171 and 6174 State Route 91, N. 36°33′20″N 81°46′11″W	Laurel Bloomery	Consists of a farmhouse and several outbuildings, including a log store.
7	Dr. Wiley Wagner Vaught Office	Dr. Wiley Wagner Vaught Office	November 20, 2009 (#09000950)	W.W. Vaught Ln., south of Dug Hill Rd. 36°24′22″N 81°48′33″W	Mountain City	Doctors' office built c. 1905 by rural physician Wiley Wagner Vaught (1874–1974).
8	A.J. Wright Farm		July 14, 2000 (#00000808)	297 A.J. Wright Rd. 36°30′05″N 81°55′46″W	Shady Valley	

=== Former listing ===
	Name on the Register	Image	Date listed	Date removed	Location	City or town	Description
1	Rhea House		April 11, 1973 (#73001799)	March 20, 1997	U.S. Route 421; 36°26′38″N 81°47′49″W	Shouns	Destroyed by fire

== Lake County ==
	Name on the Register	Image	Date listed	Location	City or town	Description
1	Caldwell-Hopson House	Caldwell-Hopson House	March 11, 1993 (#93000150)	431 Wynn St. 36°22′34″N 89°28′50″W	Tiptonville	

== Lauderdale County ==
	Name on the Register	Image	Date listed	Location	City or town	Description
1	Fort Pillow	Fort Pillow	April 11, 1973 (#73001806)	State Route 87; 35°38′20″N 89°49′56″W	Fort Pillow	
2	Lauderdale County Courthouse	Lauderdale County Courthouse	March 30, 1995 (#95000343)	Town Sq. 35°44′45″N 89°31′49″W	Ripley	
3	W.E. Palmer House	W.E. Palmer House	December 14, 1978 (#78002604)	Off U.S. Route 51; 35°40′24″N 89°34′35″W	Henning	
4	Lauderdale High School		October 29, 2021 (#100007125)	185 Spring St. 35°44′29″N 89°31′23″W	Ripley	
5	Ripley Fire Lookout Tower		March 9, 2020 (#100004684)	Joe Crihfield Rd. 35°50′59″N 89°31′04″W	Ripley	Fire lookout tower built around 1970.
6	US Post Office		September 23, 1988 (#88001582)	17 E. Jackson Ave. 35°44′41″N 89°31′39″W	Ripley	
7	Wardlaw-Steele House		January 8, 1980 (#80003844)	128 Wardlaw Pl. 35°44′31″N 89°31′59″W	Ripley	

== Lewis County ==
	Name on the Register	Image	Date listed	Location	City or town	Description
1	Ambrose Blackburn Farmstead	Ambrose Blackburn Farmstead	March 28, 1985 (#85000670)	Gordonsburg Rd. 35°33′58″N 87°23′55″W	Gordonsburg	
2	Hohenwald Railroad Depot	Hohenwald Railroad Depot	May 14, 1987 (#87000730)	State Route 99; 35°32′50″N 87°32′59″W	Hohenwald	
3	Lewis County Courthouse	Lewis County Courthouse	March 29, 2006 (#06000203)	110 N. Park St. 35°33′05″N 87°33′10″W	Hohenwald	
4	Napier Furnaces Historic District (40LS14)		May 4, 1988 (#88000459)	Address Restricted	Napier	
5	Old Natchez Trace	Old Natchez Trace	May 30, 1975 (#75002125)	From the Alabama/Tennessee border to State Route 100 in Davidson County	Gordonsburg	Extends into Davidson, Hickman, Lawrence, Maury, Wayne, and Williamson counties
6	Steele's Iron Works (40LS15)	Steele's Iron Works (40LS15)	May 4, 1988 (#88000458)	Address Restricted; 35°27′48″N 87°28′44″W	Napier	Stop along the Natchez Trace Parkway. Also labeled as Metal Ford.
7	Netherland Tait House		August 9, 1984 (#84003577)	Napier Rd. 35°27′53″N 87°28′14″W	Napier	

== Macon County ==
	Name on the Register	Image	Date listed	Location	City or town	Description
1	Belview School	Belview School	March 21, 2007 (#07000189)	Underwood Rd. near Akersville Rd. 36°36′45″N 85°59′17″W	Underwood	
2	Cloyd Hotel	Cloyd Hotel	September 11, 1986 (#86002855)	Market St. 36°31′45″N 85°50′20″W	Red Boiling Springs	Now called the Thomas House
3	Counts Hotel	Counts Hotel	September 11, 1986 (#86002856)	Market St. 36°31′49″N 85°50′50″W	Red Boiling Springs	Now called the Armour's Hotel
4	Donoho Hotel Historic District	Donoho Hotel Historic District	September 11, 1986 (#86002857)	Market St. 36°31′47″N 85°50′28″W	Red Boiling Springs	Still in operation
5	Galen Elementary School	Galen Elementary School	February 22, 1993 (#93000030)	Junction of Galen and Tucker Rds. 36°34′37″N 85°57′44″W	Galen	
6	Red Boiling Springs Bank	Red Boiling Springs Bank	September 18, 2013 (#13000747)	100 Main St. 36°31′57″N 85°51′01″W	Red Boiling Springs	Built in 1928, used as a bank until 1963

=== Former listings ===
	Name on the Register	Image	Date listed	Date removed	Location	City or town	Description
1	Long Creek School	Long Creek School	February 22, 1993 (#93000032)	March 24, 2025	Long Creek Rd. northwest of Lafayette; 36°33′27″N 86°05′38″W	Lafayette vicinity	
2	Keystone School		February 22, 1993 (#93000031)	July 22, 2014	State Route 52 west of Lafayette, just east of Gap of the Ridge; 36°31′25″N 86°06′31″W	Lafayette vicinity	

== McNairy County ==
	Name on the Register	Image	Date listed	Location	City or town	Description
1	Bethel Springs Presbyterian Church	Bethel Springs Presbyterian Church	August 18, 1983 (#83003054)	3rd Ave. 35°13′57″N 88°36′25″W	Bethel Springs	
2	Big Hill Pond Fortification	Big Hill Pond Fortification	September 29, 1998 (#98001182)	John Howell Rd. and the former Southern railroad line 35°02′12″N 88°44′06″W	Pocahontas	
3	Davis Bridge Battlefield	Davis Bridge Battlefield	July 13, 1998 (#97001549)	Roughly along Ripley-Pocahontas and Essary Spring Rds; 35°01′51″N 88°47′44″W	Pocahontas	Extends into Hardeman County
4	Wray's Bluff Fortification		September 29, 1998 (#98001183)	Address Restricted	Pocahontas	

== Moore County ==
	Name on the Register	Image	Date listed	Location	City or town	Description
1	Bobo Hotel	Bobo Hotel	April 7, 1994 (#94000283)	Main St. 35°17′03″N 86°22′10″W	Lynchburg	Built late 1850s by E.Y. Salmon, operated as boarding house during the 20th century by Jack and Mary Bobo; once a frequent meeting place for Jack Daniel's executives
2	Green-Evans House	Green-Evans House	December 17, 1992 (#92001713)	Old State Route 55 north of Lynchburg; 35°18′09″N 86°21′54″W	Lynchburg	Built by Townsend P. Green in mid-19th century; contains interior painted by noted regional painter Fred Swanton
3	Hurdlow School		March 20, 2025 (#100011548)	5759 Wet Prong Rd; 35°10′42″N 86°20′20″W	Lynchburg	
4	Jack Daniel Distillery	Jack Daniel Distillery	September 14, 1972 (#72001248)	State Route 55; 35°17′04″N 86°22′03″W	Lynchburg	
5	Ledfords Mill	Ledfords Mill	January 10, 1985 (#85000077)	1195 Shipman Creek Rd. 35°24′12″N 86°16′34″W	Lynchburg	
6	Lynchburg Historic District	Lynchburg Historic District	July 19, 1996 (#96000771)	Roughly bounded by Majors, Main, Elm, and Wall Sts. 35°16′56″N 86°22′28″W	Lynchburg	Contains several dozen buildings in the downtown Lynchburg area
7	Moore County Courthouse and Jail	Moore County Courthouse and Jail	September 26, 1979 (#79002452)	Court Sq. 35°16′55″N 86°22′25″W	Lynchburg	Courthouse built in 1885; Old jail (now a museum) located across the street from the courthouse, built in 1893

== Morgan County ==
	Name on the Register	Image	Date listed	Location	City or town	Description
1	R.M. Brooks General Store and Residence	R.M. Brooks General Store and Residence	April 14, 1992 (#92000364)	Junction of State Route 52 and Brewstertown Rd. 36°21′23″N 84°43′21″W	Rugby	Served as a post office for Rugby in the mid-20th century. Residence portion is gone.
2	Rugby Colony	Rugby Colony	April 26, 1972 (#72001249)	State Route 52; 36°21′40″N 84°42′01″W	Rugby	Extends into Scott County
3	Sixteen Tunnel	Sixteen Tunnel	July 10, 2017 (#100001306)	Tunnels through Sunbright Mt. on ATV trail/abandoned RR grade 36°15′36″N 84°39′39″W	Sunbright vicinity	
4	Tanner Store	Tanner Store	July 24, 2017 (#100001369)	201 Court St. 36°06′21″N 84°35′49″W	Wartburg	
5	Wartburg Presbyterian Church	Wartburg Presbyterian Church	December 18, 2013 (#13000952)	205 S. Kingston St. 36°06′10″N 84°35′49″W	Wartburg	

== Overton County ==
	Name on the Register	Image	Date listed	Location	City or town	Description
1	Alpine Institute	Alpine Institute	November 15, 2002 (#02001339)	State Route 52; 36°23′35″N 85°13′08″W	Alpine	Presbyterian mission school that operated between 1821 and 1947; a congregation still meets at the institute's church
2	American Legion Bohannon Post #4	American Legion Bohannon Post #4	August 7, 2012 (#12000489)	121 S. Church St. 36°22′56″N 85°19′19″W	Livingston	1940s-era quonset hut
3	Officer Farmstead	Officer Farmstead	May 2, 2001 (#01000469)	189 Rock Springs Rd. 36°11′16″N 85°16′27″W	Monterey vicinity	Maps indicate location as "Rock Springs Rd.," but the road's sign says "Rock Springs Church Rd."; part of the Historic Family Farms in Middle Tennessee Multiple Property Submission (MPS)
4	Overton County Courthouse	Overton County Courthouse	November 13, 1980 (#80003852)	Court Sq. 36°23′00″N 85°19′25″W	Livingston	
5	Gov. Albert H. Roberts Law Office	Gov. Albert H. Roberts Law Office	February 20, 1975 (#75001773)	114 E. Main St. 36°23′12″N 85°19′08″W	Livingston	Relocated a few blocks away to junction of Roberts St. and University Ave.; designed in the Victorian style known as Stick-Eastlake
6	Standing Stone Rustic Park Historic District	Standing Stone Rustic Park Historic District	July 8, 1986 (#86002794)	Standing Stone State Park; 36°27′45″N 85°24′42″W	Livingston vicinity	part of the State Parks in Tennessee Built by the CCC and the WPA, 1934--1942, Thematic Resource (TR)
7	Twinton Fire Lookout Tower		June 28, 2021 (#100006707)	Threet Rd. 36°17′29″N 85°08′19″W	Crawford vicinity	

== Perry County ==
	Name on the Register	Image	Date listed	Location	City or town	Description
1	Dr. Richard Calvin Bromley House		November 29, 1995 (#95001373)	State Route 13 near its junction with Slink Shoals Rd. 35°28′35″N 87°49′36″W	Flat Woods	
2	Cedar Grove Furnace	Cedar Grove Furnace	June 19, 1973 (#73001814)	Buckfork Rd., southwest of Linden; 35°33′32″N 87°57′40″W	Linden vicinity	Boundaries increased on September 28, 1988
3	Craig Family Farm		May 15, 2006 (#05001219)	1031 N. Fork Rd. 35°40′51″N 87°53′58″W	Linden vicinity	
4	James Dickson House	James Dickson House	March 28, 1985 (#85000668)	Lower Lick Creek Rd. 35°41′20″N 87°57′37″W	Linden vicinity	
5	Hufstedler Gravehouse	Hufstedler Gravehouse	June 25, 1987 (#87001038)	Hurricane Creek Rd. 35°33′37″N 87°49′01″W	Linden vicinity	Also known as Pinckney's Tomb
6	Perry County Courthouse	Perry County Courthouse	March 30, 1995 (#95000339)	Town Square; 35°37′02″N 87°50′15″W	Linden	

== Pickett County ==
	Name on the Register	Image	Date listed	Location	City or town	Description
1	Cordell Hull Birthplace	Cordell Hull Birthplace	May 5, 1972 (#72001250)	About 2 miles west of Byrdstown; 36°34′55″N 85°11′02″W	Byrdstown vicinity	The birthplace cabin of U.S. Secretary of State Cordell Hull
2	Pickett County Courthouse	Pickett County Courthouse	March 30, 1995 (#95000338)	Town Sq. 36°34′11″N 85°07′44″W	Byrdstown	
3	Pickett State Rustic Park Historic District	Pickett State Rustic Park Historic District	July 8, 1986 (#86002795)	Pickett State Park and Forest; 36°33′25″N 84°47′43″W	Jamestown vicinity	Contains several park structures built by the CCC in the 1930s and 1940s

== Rhea County ==
	Name on the Register	Image	Date listed	Location	City or town	Description
1	Blythe Ferry	Blythe Ferry	January 5, 1983 (#83003055)	North of Birchwood on State Route 60 at the Tennessee River; 35°24′51″N 85°00′41″W	Dayton vicinity	Extends into Meigs County
2	Broyles-Darwin House	Broyles-Darwin House	July 9, 1997 (#97000779)	108 Idaho; 35°29′06″N 85°01′10″W	Dayton	
3	First Avenue Methodist Episcopal Church	First Avenue Methodist Episcopal Church	November 16, 2020 (#100005790)	240 1st Ave. 35°29′34″N 85°00′43″W	Dayton	
4	Hastings-Locke Ferry	Hastings-Locke Ferry	January 5, 1983 (#83003056)	East of Dayton on State Route 30 at the Tennessee River; 35°32′15″N 84°52′41″W	Dayton vicinity	Extends into Meigs County
5	Hiwassee Garrison Site	Hiwassee Garrison Site	November 14, 1978 (#78002625)	West bank of the Tennessee River, south of Dayton; 35°26′23″N 84°59′13″W	Dayton vicinity	
6	Rhea County Courthouse	Rhea County Courthouse	November 7, 1972 (#72001251)	Market St. between 2nd and 3rd Aves. 35°29′42″N 85°00′46″W	Dayton	
7	Dr. Walter Thomison House	Dr. Walter Thomison House	September 11, 1997 (#97001140)	656 Market St. 35°29′10″N 85°01′11″W	Dayton	
8	Watts Bar Hydroelectric Project	Watts Bar Hydroelectric Project	August 14, 2017 (#100001474)	6868 State Route 68; 35°37′13″N 84°47′04″W	Spring City vicinity	Extends into Meigs County

== Scott County ==
	Name on the Register	Image	Date listed	Location	City or town	Description
1	Barton Chapel	Barton Chapel	July 12, 1984 (#84003679)	U.S. Route 27; 36°21′06″N 84°35′19″W	Robbins	
2	Black Creek Fire Lookout Tower	Black Creek Fire Lookout Tower	November 15, 2017 (#100001828)	Black Creek Rd. 36°23′13″N 84°36′39″W	Robbins	
3	Louis E. Bryant House	Louis E. Bryant House	May 29, 1975 (#75001776)	2 miles east of Oneida on Bear Creek Rd. 36°32′36″N 84°30′12″W	Oneida	
4	First National Bank of Huntsville	First National Bank of Huntsville	July 11, 1985 (#85001510)	4 Courthouse Square; 36°24′33″N 84°29′27″W	Huntsville	
5	Old Scott County Jail	Old Scott County Jail	April 18, 1974 (#74001927)	214 Litton Covered Bridge Rd; 36°24′30″N 84°29′27″W	Huntsville	
6	Oneida and Western Bridge		December 18, 2025 (#100012393)	O&W Road over the Big South Fork of the Cumberland River; 36°27′15″N 84°39′06″W	Oneida vicinity	
7	Rugby Colony	Rugby Colony	April 26, 1972 (#72001249)	State Route 52; 36°21′40″N 84°42′01″W	Rugby	Extends into Morgan County; Scott County section of the district includes Laurel Dale Cemetery.
8	Scott County Courthouse	Scott County Courthouse	April 26, 1972 (#100013588)	283 Court Street; 36°24′34″N 84°29′25″W	Huntsville	

=== Former listings ===
	Name on the Register	Image	Date listed	Date removed	Location	City or town	Description
1	Huntsville High School		July 2, 1987 (#87001119)	February 7, 1996	220 E. Main St.	Huntsville	
2	Paint Rock Creek Covered Bridge		April 18, 1977 (#77001287)	June 19, 1980	SE of Huntsville on Jacksboro Rd.	Huntsville vicinity	Destroyed by fire in March, 1980.

== Sequatchie County ==
	Name on the Register	Image	Date listed	Location	City or town	Description
1	Douglas Coal and Coke Company Clubhouse	Douglas Coal and Coke Company Clubhouse	November 7, 1996 (#96001317)	512 Mountain View; 35°22′38″N 85°23′55″W	Dunlap	Built by Douglas Coal and Coke Company for visiting businesspeople
2	Dunlap Coke Ovens	Dunlap Coke Ovens	July 5, 1985 (#85001489)	Hickory St. and Cordell Rd. 35°22′48″N 85°24′06″W	Dunlap	Ruins of early 20th century ovens used to convert coal into coke
3	Dunlap Community Building	Dunlap Community Building	November 21, 1994 (#94001337)	227 Cherry St; 35°22′18″N 85°23′26″W	Dunlap	Built by the National Youth Administration, 1938–1942; currently home to the Sequatchie County Library
4	Dunlap Mercantile		November 12, 2026 (#100013597)	15664 Rankin Avenue; 35°22′19″N 85°23′25″W	Dunlap	
5	Hill Road at the Cumberland Plateau	Hill Road at the Cumberland Plateau	August 7, 2005 (#05000801)	West of Fredonia Rd., 1.0 mile northwest of downtown Dunlap; 35°23′08″N 85°23′59″W	Dunlap	A Trail of Tears site
6	Sequatchie County Courthouse	Sequatchie County Courthouse	January 20, 1980 (#80003853)	Cherry St. 35°22′17″N 85°23′14″W	Dunlap	

== Trousdale County ==
	Name on the Register	Image	Date listed	Location	City or town	Description
1	Averitt-Herod House	Averitt-Herod House	April 12, 1996 (#96000411)	395 Herod Ln. 36°22′28″N 86°09′39″W	Hartsville	Originally built in 1832
2	James R. DeBow House	James R. DeBow House	November 3, 1988 (#88002381)	State Route 25; 36°23′02″N 86°07′16″W	Hartsville	Italianate-style house constructed intermittently between 1854 and 1870
3	Hartsville Battlefield		October 28, 1998 (#98001247)	Address Restricted	Hartsville	
4	Hartsville Depot	Hartsville Depot	July 3, 1980 (#80003876)	Broadway; 36°23′43″N 86°09′55″W	Hartsville	Now houses offices of the Hartsville-Trousdale Co. Chamber of Commerce
5	Hartsville Historic District	Hartsville Historic District	June 24, 1993 (#93000568)	Roughly bounded by Church, Front, River, Greentop, and Court Sts. 36°23′26″N 86°10′02″W	Hartsville	
6	Turney-Hutchins House	Turney-Hutchins House	July 1, 1992 (#92000780)	State Route 25; 36°23′31″N 86°09′12″W	Hartsville	
7	Ward School	Ward School	July 20, 2020 (#100005367)	113 Hall St. 36°23′38″N 86°10′16″W	Hartsville	

== Unicoi County ==
	Name on the Register	Image	Date listed	Location	City or town	Description
1	A.R. Brown House	A.R. Brown House	November 8, 2007 (#07001167)	241 S. Main Ave. 36°08′38″N 82°25′07″W	Erwin	
2	Clarksville Iron Furnace	Clarksville Iron Furnace	June 4, 1973 (#73001852)	Southwest of Erwin off State Route 107 in the Cherokee National Forest; 36°08′53″N 82°31′40″W	Erwin vicinity	In Cherokee National Forest
3	Clinchfield Depot	Clinchfield Depot	June 22, 1993 (#93000530)	Junction of Nolichucky Ave. and Union St. 36°08′43″N 82°25′08″W	Erwin	
4	Holland Higgins Homestead		October 28, 2026 (#100013582)	Left Higgins Creek Road and Bill Shelton Road; 35°59′43″N 82°31′34″W	Flag Pond vicinity	
5	Tilson Farm		June 17, 1994 (#94000613)	242 Little Branch Rd. 36°02′12″N 82°31′55″W	Flag Pond	

== Union County ==
	Name on the Register	Image	Date listed	Location	City or town	Description
1	Booker Farm	Booker Farm	June 25, 1999 (#99000721)	Corryton-Luttrell Rd. 36°10′11″N 83°46′11″W	Luttrell vicinity	
2	Chuck Swan Fire Lookout Tower		June 28, 2021 (#100006709)	Main Forest Rd. 36°22′19″N 83°53′34″W	Sharps Chapel vicinity	Within Chuck Swan State Forest
3	Hamilton-Lay Store	Hamilton-Lay Store	March 15, 2011 (#11000084)	Intersection of Mill Pond Hollow Rd. and Walkers Ford Rd. 36°16′04″N 83°44′24″W	Maynardville vicinity	
4	Hamilton-Tolliver Complex	Hamilton-Tolliver Complex	March 12, 2010 (#10000087)	158 Kettle Hollow Rd. 36°17′19″N 83°45′17″W	Maynardville vicinity	
5	Maynardville State Bank	Maynardville State Bank	November 21, 2001 (#01001259)	1001 Main St. 36°14′59″N 83°47′54″W	Maynardville	
6	Oak Grove School	Oak Grove School	November 26, 2018 (#100003161)	410 Brantley Rd. 36°21′14″N 83°49′06″W	Sharps Chapel	
7	Baite Ousley House	Baite Ousley House	March 4, 1975 (#75001794)	15 miles southwest of Tazewell, north of Norris Lake on Big Valley Rd. 36°19′05″N 83°51′15″W	Sharps Chapel vicinity	Built by Jacob Sharp; also known as the Jacob Sharp House

== Van Buren County ==
	Name on the Register	Image	Date listed	Location	City or town	Description
1	Big Bone Cave	Big Bone Cave	April 11, 1973 (#73001853)	East of Bone Cave and west of the summit of Tandy Knob; 35°46′38″N 85°33′19″W	Bone Cave	
2	Crain Hill School and Church	Crain Hill School and Church	March 21, 1985 (#85000622)	Crain Hill Rd. 35°43′02″N 85°35′18″W	Crain Hill	Built in 1870
3	Higginbotham Turnpike		July 20, 2020 (#100005368)	Pleasant Hill Cemetery Rd. 35°35′29″N 85°31′30″W	Spencer	
4	Rocky River Crossing and Road		November 15, 2006 (#06001038)	Rocky River and a continuation of Pleasant Hill Cemetery Rd. 35°35′33″N 85°31′11″W	Spencer	A Trail of Tears site

== Wayne County ==
	Name on the Register	Image	Date listed	Location	City or town	Description
1	Collinwood Railroad Station	Collinwood Railroad Station	March 24, 1988 (#88000264)	Old railroad bed 35°10′25″N 87°44′19″W	Collinwood	Built in 1916; now a library and museum
2	Evans Chapel United Methodist Church		July 9, 1999 (#99000757)	Old Clifton Turnpike; 35°21′13″N 87°57′19″W	Waynesboro	
3	First Presbyterian Church of Clifton		March 8, 1988 (#88000172)	Main St. 35°23′05″N 87°59′39″W	Clifton	
4	Forty-eight Forge (40WY63)		April 11, 1988 (#88000254)	Address Restricted	Waynesboro	
5	Hughes House		November 17, 2020 (#100005793)	204 West Pillow St. 35°23′10″N 87°59′34″W	Clifton	
6	Marion Furnace (40WY61)		April 9, 1988 (#88000252)	Address Restricted	Eagle Creek	
7	Old Natchez Trace	Old Natchez Trace	May 30, 1975 (#75002125)	From the Alabama/Tennessee border to State Route 100 in Davidson County	Collinwood	Extends into Davidson, Hickman, Lawrence, Lewis, Maury, and Williamson counties
8	Water Street Historic District		July 8, 1992 (#92000829)	Water St. (State Route 128) between Polk and Cedar Sts. 35°23′15″N 87°59′33″W	Clifton	
9	Wayne County Courthouse	Wayne County Courthouse	July 29, 2020 (#100005369)	100 Court Cir. 35°19′16″N 87°45′48″W	Waynesboro	
10	Waynesboro Cumberland Presbyterian Church	Waynesboro Cumberland Presbyterian Church	October 22, 1987 (#87001877)	High St. 35°19′16″N 87°45′48″W	Waynesboro	Congregation founded in 1846; church constructed in 1854

== See also ==
- List of historical societies in Tennessee
- List of National Historic Landmarks in Tennessee
