= Rucker House =

Rucker House may refer to:

in the United States (by state then city)

- Rucker House (Bauxite, Arkansas), in Saline County, listed on the National Register of Historic Places (NRHP)
- Simeon and Jane Rucker Log House, Alpharetta, Georgia, listed on the National Register of Historic Places in Fulton County, Georgia
- Beulah Rucker House-School, Gainesville, Georgia, listed on the National Register of Historic Places in Hall County, Georgia
- Rucker House (Ruckersville, Georgia), in Elbert County, NRHP-listed
- Benjamine Rucker House, Compton, Rutherford County, Tennessee, NRHP-listed
- Rucker-Mason Farm, Porterfield, Tennessee, listed on the NRHP in Cannon County, Tennessee
- Marshall-Rucker-Smith House, Charlottesville, Virginia, NRHP-listed
- Rucker House (Everett, Washington), in Snohomish County, NRHP-listed
