= Long Creek School =

Long Creek School may refer to one of these United States subjects:

- Long Creek School (Blair, Nebraska), a building listed on the National Register of Historic Places (NRHP) in Nebraska
- Long Creek School (Oregon), a public school in Long Creek, Oregon
- Long Creek School (Lafayette, Tennessee), a building listed on the NRHP in Tennessee
