= Vinewood =

Vinewood may refer to:

- Vinewood (Detroit), residence of Bela Hubbard
- James R. DeBow House, a historic house in Hartsville, Tennessee
- Vinewood (Newnan, Georgia), see National Register of Historic Places listings in Coweta County, Georgia
- Vinewood (Winchester, Kentucky), see National Register of Historic Places listings in Clark County, Kentucky
- Vinewood, a fictional settlement in the Grand Theft Auto franchise
