= Bobo Hotel =

- U.S. National Register of Historic Places
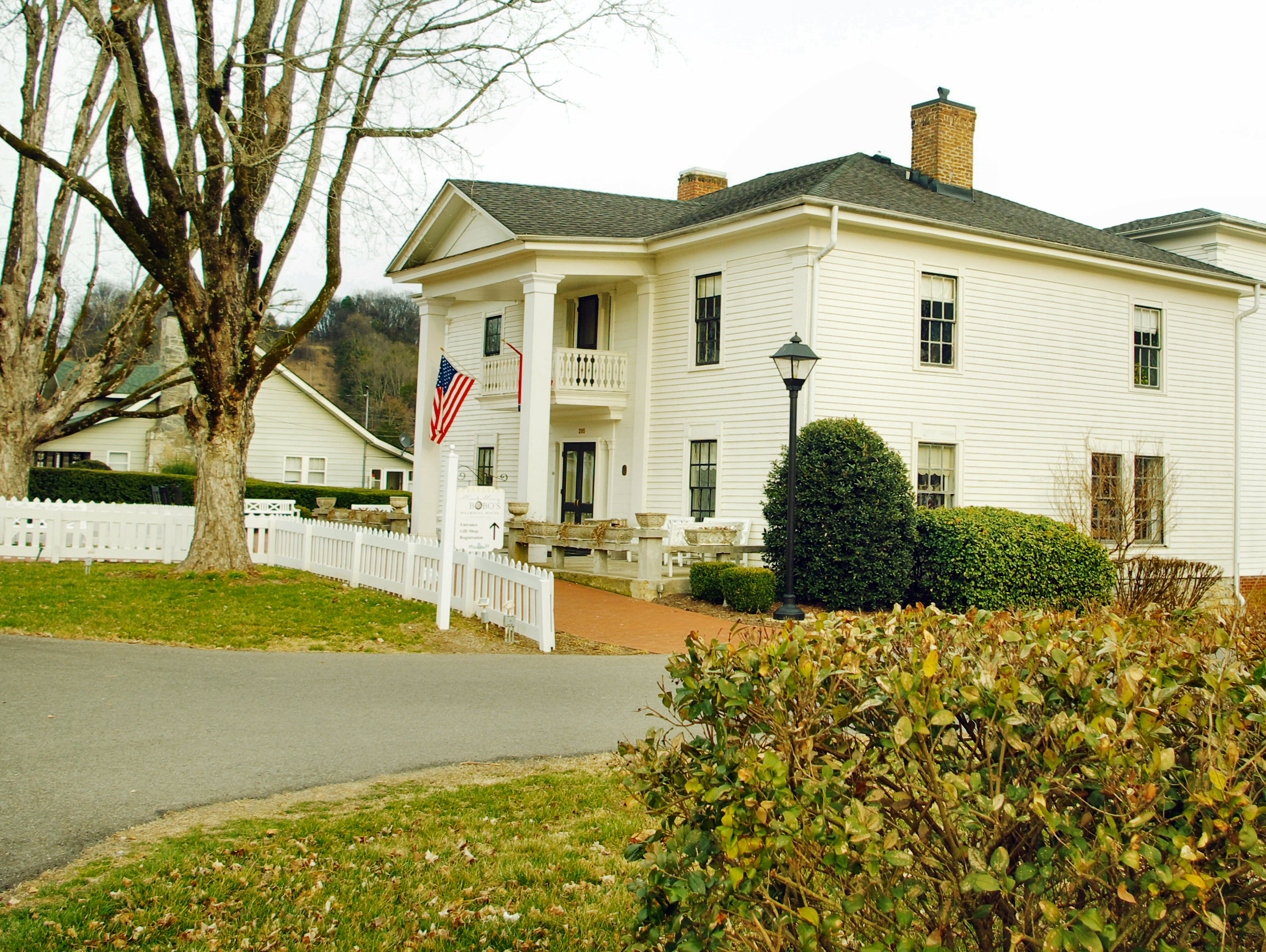
- The hotel in 2014

- Location within Tennessee
- Location: Main Street, Lynchburg, Tennessee
- Coordinates: 35°17′03″N 86°22′10″W
- Area: 1.7 acres (0.69 ha)
- Built: 1867
- Architectural style: Greek Revival
- NRHP reference No.: 94000283
- Added to NRHP: April 7, 1994

The Bobo Hotel, also known as Miss Mary Bobo's Boarding House and Grand Central Hotel, is a historic hotel and boarding house in Lynchburg, Tennessee. It was built for a Confederate veteran, and it later belonged to relatives of the owners of Jack Daniel's. It is listed on the National Register of Historic Places.

== History ==
The hotel was built in 1867 for Dr. E Y. Salmon, a physician who served in the Confederate States Army during the American Civil War of 1861–1865. The second floor served as the Moore County courthouse from 1872 to 1880, while Salmon was county clerk/master. Salmon became a Freemason, and he later moved to Nashville, where he died in 1914.

From 1908 to 1982, the hotel belonged to Jack and Mary Evans Bobo, who ran it as a boarding house. The husband died in 1948, and the wife became the sole proprietor. One of her tenants was Tom Motlow, whose uncle was the eponymous founder of Jack Daniel's, the whiskey distillery. In 1907, Jack Daniels gave his nephew Lem Motlow (also Mary's brother in law) and his cousin Dick Daniel the distillery when his health began to fail. Lem was also a state representative. Bobo refused to serve whiskey in her boarding house. She died in 1983, at age 101. The Jack Daniels Distillery purchased the restaurant at that point and continued to operate it.

== Architectural significance ==
The building was designed in the Greek Revival architectural style. It has been listed on the National Register of Historic Places since April 7, 1994.
