= Collinwood Railroad Station =

- U.S. National Register of Historic Places
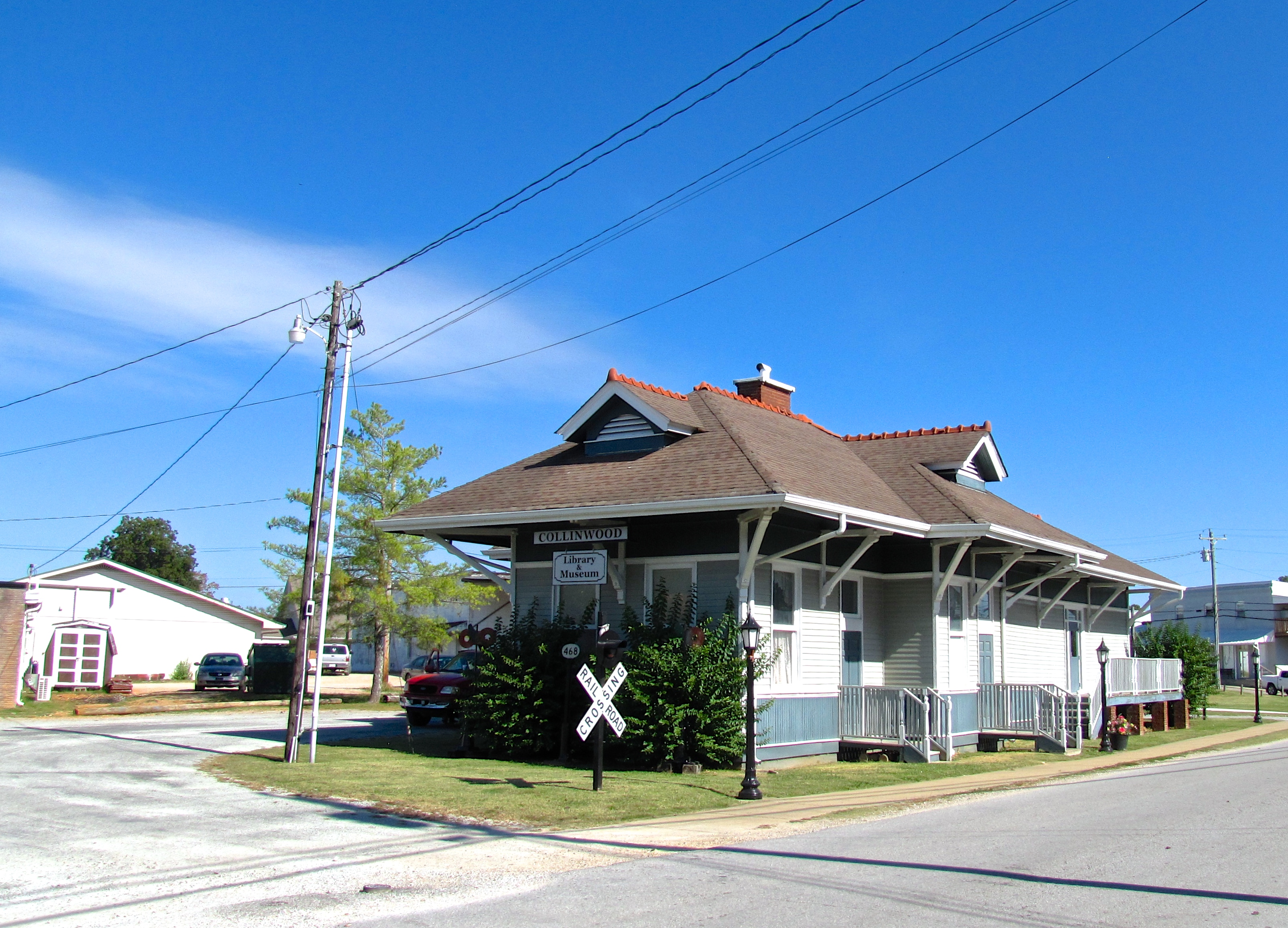

- Location within Tennessee
- Location: Old railroad bed, Collinwood, Tennessee
- Coordinates: 35.17359°N 87.73867°W
- Area: less than one acre
- Built: 1916
- NRHP reference No.: 88000264
- Added to NRHP: March 24, 1988

The Collinwood station is a former railway station in Collinwood, Tennessee. It is listed on the National Register of Historic Places. It is now the Collinwood Depot Library.

== History ==
Rail service to Collinwood began in December 1913 with the station building opening in 1916. It was a station of the Tennessee Western Railroad, which would later be incorporated into the Louisville and Nashville Railroad.

The railroad line did not survive the Great Depression and the former Tennessee Western tracks were removed by the L&N between 1940 and 1941.

By 1947, the station building was being used as a private residence, a warehouse, and a grist mill. In 1965 it served as the new location for Collinwood City Hall.

By 1980 it had become a senior citizens center. It was listed on the National Register of Historic Places in 1988.

On September 4, 2001, it became a library and museum.

== See also ==
- National Register of Historic Places listings in Tennessee
