= Wardlaw-Steele House =

Historic house in Tennessee, United States

- U.S. National Register of Historic Places
- Location within Tennessee Location within the United States
- Location: 128 Wardlaw Pl., Ripley, Tennessee
- Coordinates: 35°44′31″N 89°31′59″W
- Area: 0.7 acres (0.28 ha)
- Built: 1842
- Architectural style: Greek Revival
- NRHP reference No.: 80003844
- Added to NRHP: January 8, 1980

The Wardlaw-Steele House in Ripley, Tennessee was built in c.1842. It was listed on the National Register of Historic Places in 1980.

It is a two-story Greek Revival wood-frame building with a two-story portico having six Ionic columns. It has 14 rooms, with eight fireplaces linked to three large chimneys.

The original part of the house is supported by mortise-and-tenon-connected hand hewn 18 inches (0.46 m) square beams, and is insulated with raw cotton. The interior was renovated in Victorian style in about 1887. The eight fireplaces and mantels vary in style.
