= Lauderdale High School =

- U.S. National Register of Historic Places
- Location within Tennessee Location within the United States
- Location: 185 Spring St., Ripley, Tennessee
- Coordinates: 35.7414°N 89.5230°W
- Area: 2.21 acres (0.89 ha)
- Built: 1912, 1950s
- Architectural style: International Style
- NRHP reference No.: 100007125
- Added to NRHP: October 29, 2021

The Lauderdale High School in Ripley, Tennessee, was a high school serving African Americans around 1950 to 1969 under "separate but equal" doctrine of segregation in the United States. It was built around a 1912 core which was the Lauderdale County Training School. It was listed on the National Register of Historic Places in 2021.

Tennessee states:

Located in Ripley, the county seat of Lauderdale County, the Lauderdale High School is an important example of how African Americans utilized schools as multi-purpose community buildings. While the education of African American youth during Jim Crow may have been the primary focus of the school building, Lauderdale High School was the focus for many civic and social activities. The core of the school building was built in 1912 as the Lauderdale County Training School, but around 1950 the school was expanded to its current size and appearance as part of the "separate but equal" doctrines of that time. It was not until after the U.S. Department of Health, Education, and Welfare mentioned cutting off funds for counties failing to meet desegregation guidelines, that the Lauderdale High School closed in 1969.

Its National Register of Historic Places nomination states it is an:

irregularly shaped, rambling building comprised of remnants of a 1912 two-story rectangular building with ca. 1950 additions on the north, east, south, and partial west sides. The building has a flat roof, brick veneer exterior, and a cast concrete foundation. The ca. 1950 additions give the building an International Style aesthetic, common for midcentury school buildings. Though vacant, the building is representative of midcentury public-school architecture and is consistent with other historic African American schools that have changed to accommodate new uses for their communities.
