= Bank of Alamo =

- U.S. National Register of Historic Places
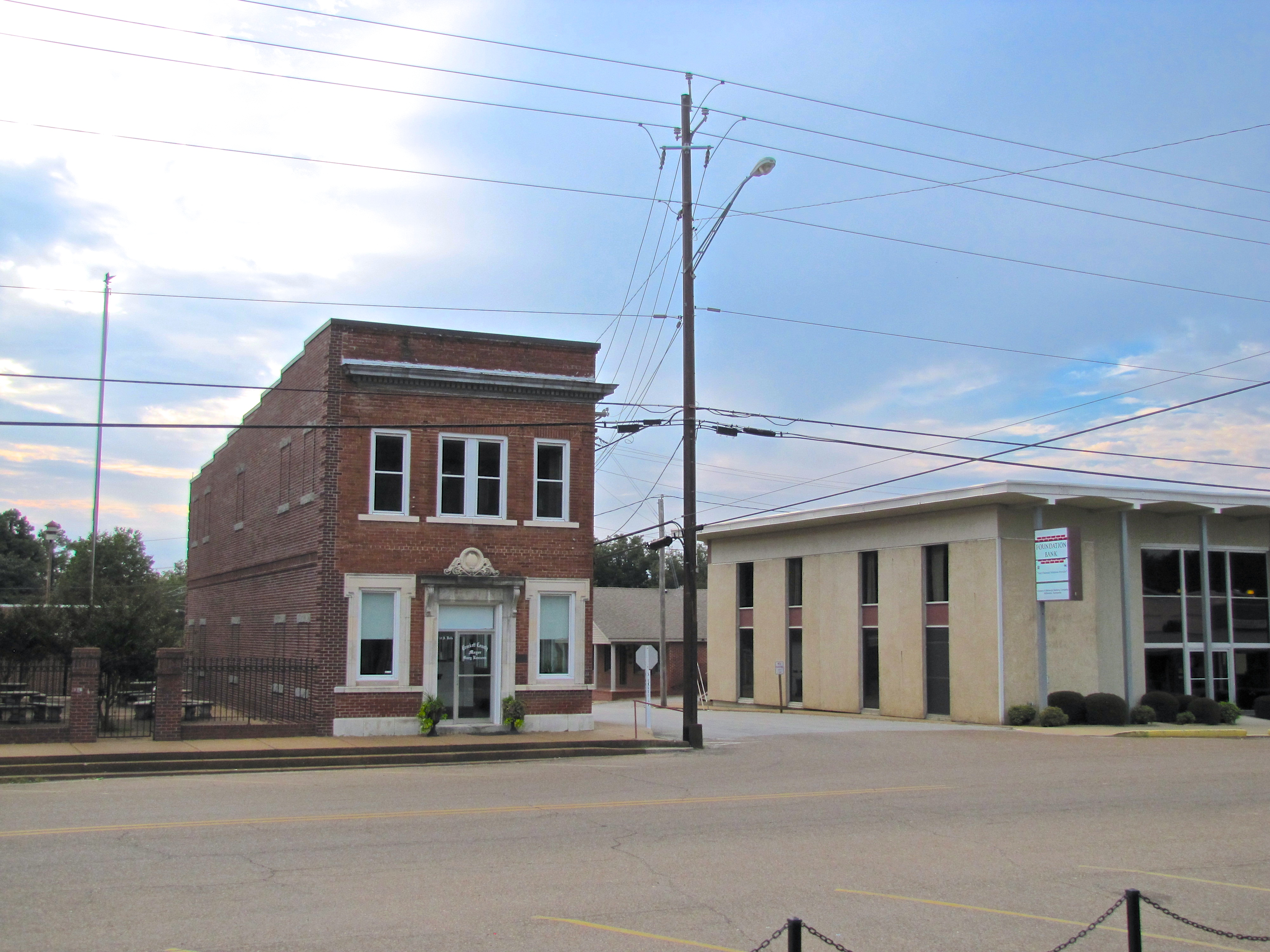

- Location within Tennessee
- Location: 103 S. Bells St., Alamo, Tennessee
- Coordinates: 35°47′06″N 89°07′02″W
- Area: less than one acre
- Built: 1912
- Architectural style: Classical Revival
- NRHP reference No.: 86001397
- Added to NRHP: June 26, 1986

The Bank of Alamo, at 103 S. Bells St. in Alamo, Tennessee, is a two-story brick building with limestone trim. It was listed on the National Register of Historic Places in 1986.

The bank was founded in 1902 and built this building in 1912 in Classical Revival style. Elements of its neo-classical style include "shouldered architrave limestone window surrounds, the limestone door surround with scroll brackets and cornice, and the limestone cornice on the exterior and by the pressed tin ceiling, mosaic tile floor, and window trim on the interior."
