= Hillsman House =

Historic house in Tennessee, United States

- Formerly listed on the U.S. National Register of Historic Places
- Location within Tennessee Location within the United States
- Nearest city: Trezevant, Tennessee
- Coordinates: 36°02′23″N 88°36′44″W
- Area: 2.5 acres (1.0 ha)
- Built: 1866
- Architectural style: Greek Revival
- NRHP reference No.: 82003955

Significant dates
- Added to NRHP: March 25, 1982
- Removed from NRHP: June 10, 2022

The Hillsman House (also known as the Hillsman-Woodson House) is a historic house in Trezevant, Tennessee. It was built in 1866-1869 for Major John Hinde Hillsman, who served in the Confederate States Army during the American Civil War of 1861–1865.

His father, William Reddick Hillsman, had settled here in 1820 and acquired 3300 acres, which John and his brother Bennett began to manage shortly before the American Civil War.

After the war and the abolition of slavery, John Hillsman sold off much of the property to focus on a smaller productive farm. His son James Hillsman inherited the house in the 1890s, and cultivated the smaller family property for alfalfa as the commodity crop. He was the first major producer and promoter of alfalfa in that area.

The house is described as "a two-story, three-bay vernacular adaptation of Greek Revival architecture." It was listed on the National Register of Historic Places in 1982. It was delisted in early June 2022 after having been demolished. The Tennessee Historical Commission has a highway marker on Old McKenzie Road for the Hillsman House (Marker number 4A35).
