= Dr. Walter Thomison House =

- U.S. National Register of Historic Places
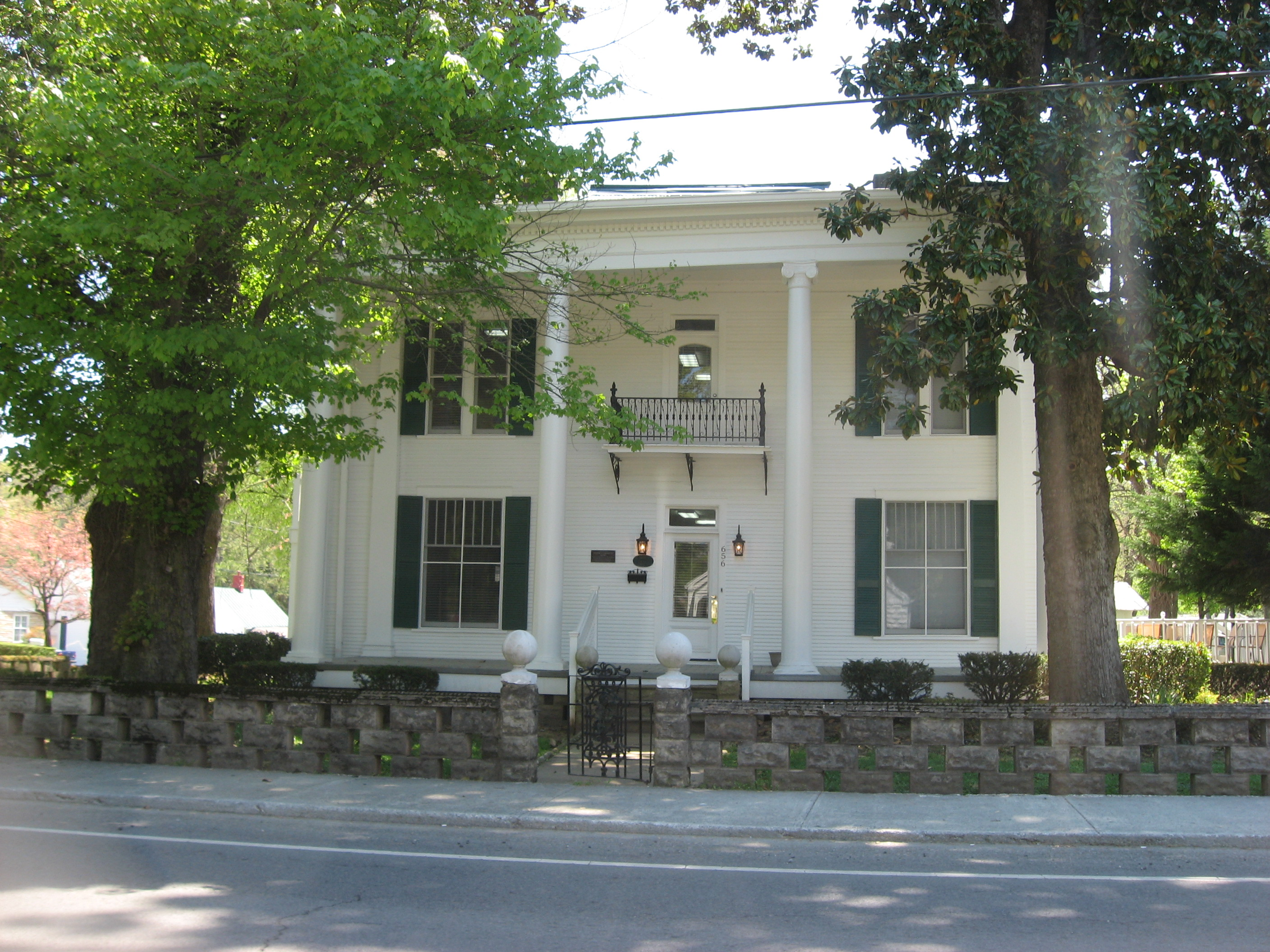

- Location within Tennessee Location within the United States
- Location: 656 Market Street, Dayton, Tennessee
- Coordinates: 35°29′10″N 85°01′11″W
- Area: less than one acre
- Built: 1890
- Architectural style: Colonial Revival
- NRHP reference No.: 97001140
- Added to NRHP: September 11, 1997

The Dr. Walter Thomison House is a historic house in Dayton, Tennessee, U.S.. it was built in 1890 for Walter Thomison, a physician, and his wife, Ella Darwin Thomison. It remained in the Thomison family until 1989. It was designed in the Colonial Revival architectural style. It has been listed on the National Register of Historic Places since September 11, 1997.

It has also been known as the Magnolia House Bed and Breakfast.
