= John Rushing Farm =

- Formerly listed on the U.S. National Register of Historic Places
- Nearest city: Camden, Tennessee
- Area: 0 acres (0 ha)
- Built: 1900
- Architectural style: Colonial Revival
- NRHP reference No.: 99001587

Significant dates
- Added to NRHP: December 17, 1999
- Removed from NRHP: June 10, 2022

The John Rushing Farm is a historic farm with a main house and several buildings in Camden, Tennessee, U.S..

The main house was built in 1900. It was purchased by John Rushing and his wife, née Myrtle McRae, in 1915. Rushing purchased it with several buildings, including a house for African-American tenants.

The main house was designed in the Colonial Revival architectural style. It was listed on the National Register of Historic Places in 1999, and was delisted in 2022.
