= Netherland Tait House =

- U.S. National Register of Historic Places
- Location within Tennessee Location within the United States
- Nearest city: Napier, Tennessee
- Coordinates: 35°27′53″N 87°28′14″W
- Area: 2 acres (0.81 ha)
- Built: 1850
- Built by: Tate, Netherland
- NRHP reference No.: 84003577
- Added to NRHP: August 9, 1984

The Netherland Tait House is a historic loghouse near Napier, Tennessee. It was built in 1850 on the former McLish Indian Reservation for Netherland Tate, a landowner who owned slaves. It remained in the Tate family until his granddaughter, Nancy Browning, sold it in 1928. It has been listed on the National Register of Historic Places since August 9, 1984.
