= Bledsoe County Jail =

- U.S. National Register of Historic Places
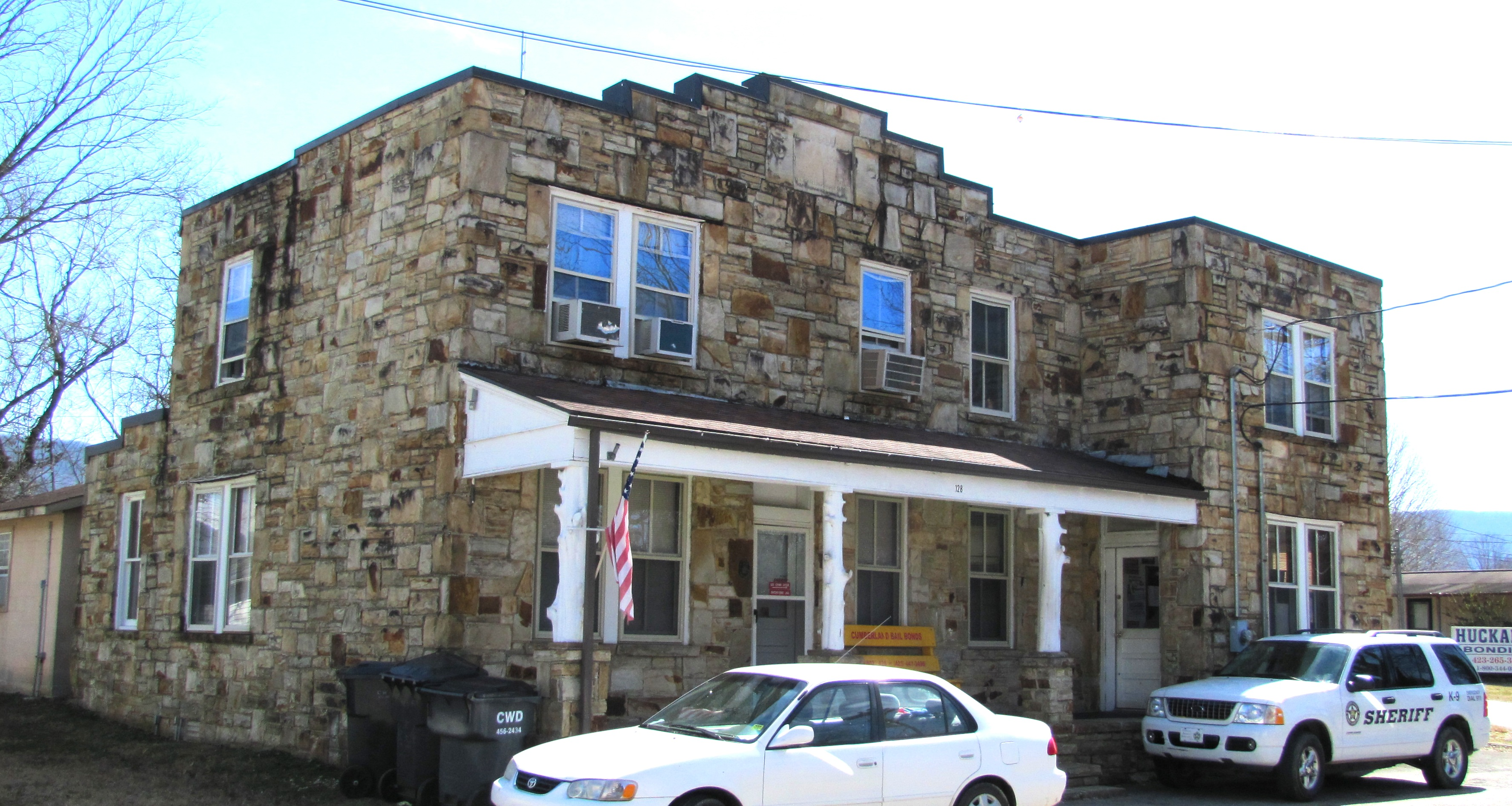

- Location within Tennessee Location within the United States
- Location: 128 Frazier St., Pikeville, Tennessee
- Coordinates: 35°36′15.5″N 85°11′17.5″W
- Area: less than one acre
- NRHP reference No.: 08001049
- Added to NRHP: November 12, 2008

The Bledsoe County Jail is a historic jail in Pikeville, Tennessee.

The original building was a brick building with a stone foundation that was completed in 1851. It had a capacity of five prisoners. Renovations made around 1880 included installation of wooden doors, windows, a stairway, and wood floors. The building was expanded with a new stone exterior in 1937. It was listed on the National Register of Historic Places, when it was still in active use as Bledsoe County's jail, making it the oldest operating jail in Tennessee. At the time of its National Register listing, it had two stories and held up to nine prisoners.
