= Pioneer Hall (Pleasant Hill, Tennessee) =

- U.S. National Register of Historic Places
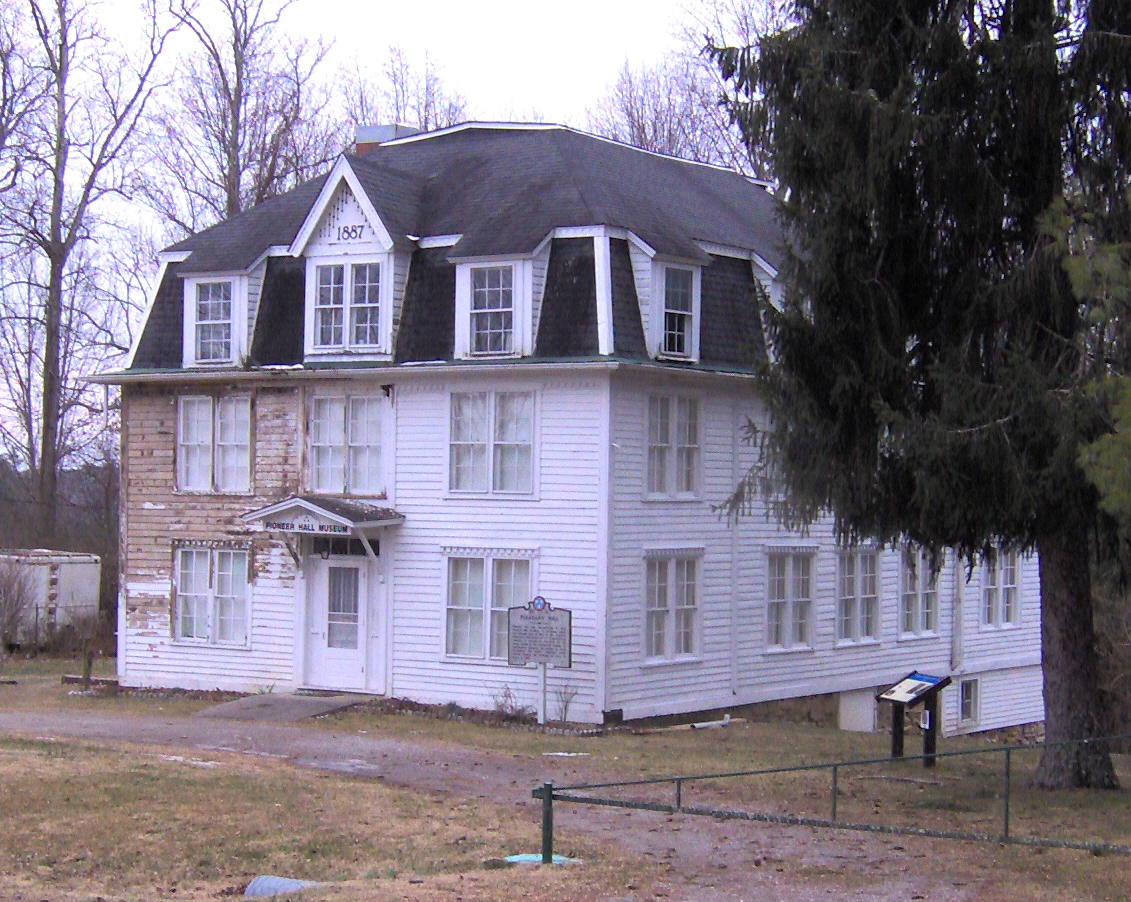
- Pioneer Hall in 2010

- Location within Tennessee
- Location: Main Street, Pleasant Hill, Tennessee
- Coordinates: 35°58′34″N 85°11′40″W
- Area: 0.5 acres (0.20 ha)
- Built: 1889
- NRHP reference No.: 78002576
- Added to NRHP: November 21, 1978

Pioneer Hall is a historic school building in Pleasant Hill, Tennessee, U.S. It was built for the American Missionary Association from 1887 to 1889, and housed Wheeler Hall, a part of the Pleasant Hill Academy. It was designed by Reverend Benjamin Dodge, a Congregationalist from Maine.

It has been listed on the National Register of Historic Places since November 21, 1978. It is now known as the Pioneer Hall Museum.
