= Crain Hill School and Church =

- U.S. National Register of Historic Places
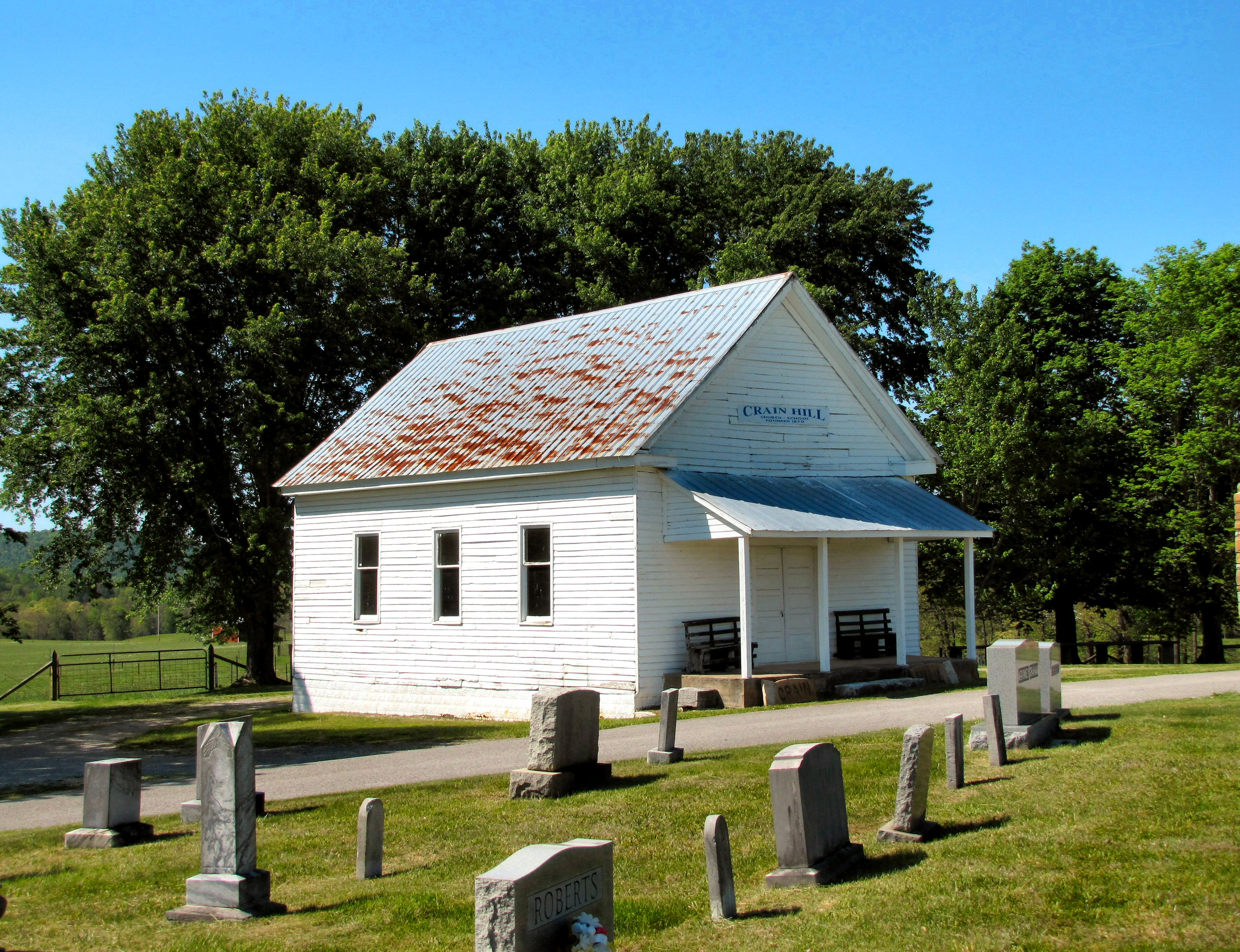

- Location within Tennessee
- Location: Crain Hill Rd., Crain Hill, Tennessee
- Coordinates: 35°43′02″N 85°35′18″W
- Area: less than one acre
- Built: c.1870
- NRHP reference No.: 85000622
- Added to NRHP: March 21, 1985

The Crain Hill School and Church, in Crain Hill, Tennessee, is a building dating from around 1870. It was listed on the National Register of Historic Places in 1985.

It is a one-room weatherboarded gable roofed vernacular building, upon a wooden pier foundation which is covered with pressed metal. Simple decoration includes gable returns and molding around the main entry.

It was built to serve as both a school and place of worship for inhabitants of the Rocky River Valley. Its last use as a schoolhouse was in 1927 when a new larger school was built further up the Rocky River Road. It continued to serve as a church until the mid-1900s.

It was a one-room schoolhouse.
