= Hamlett-Smith House =

- U.S. National Register of Historic Places
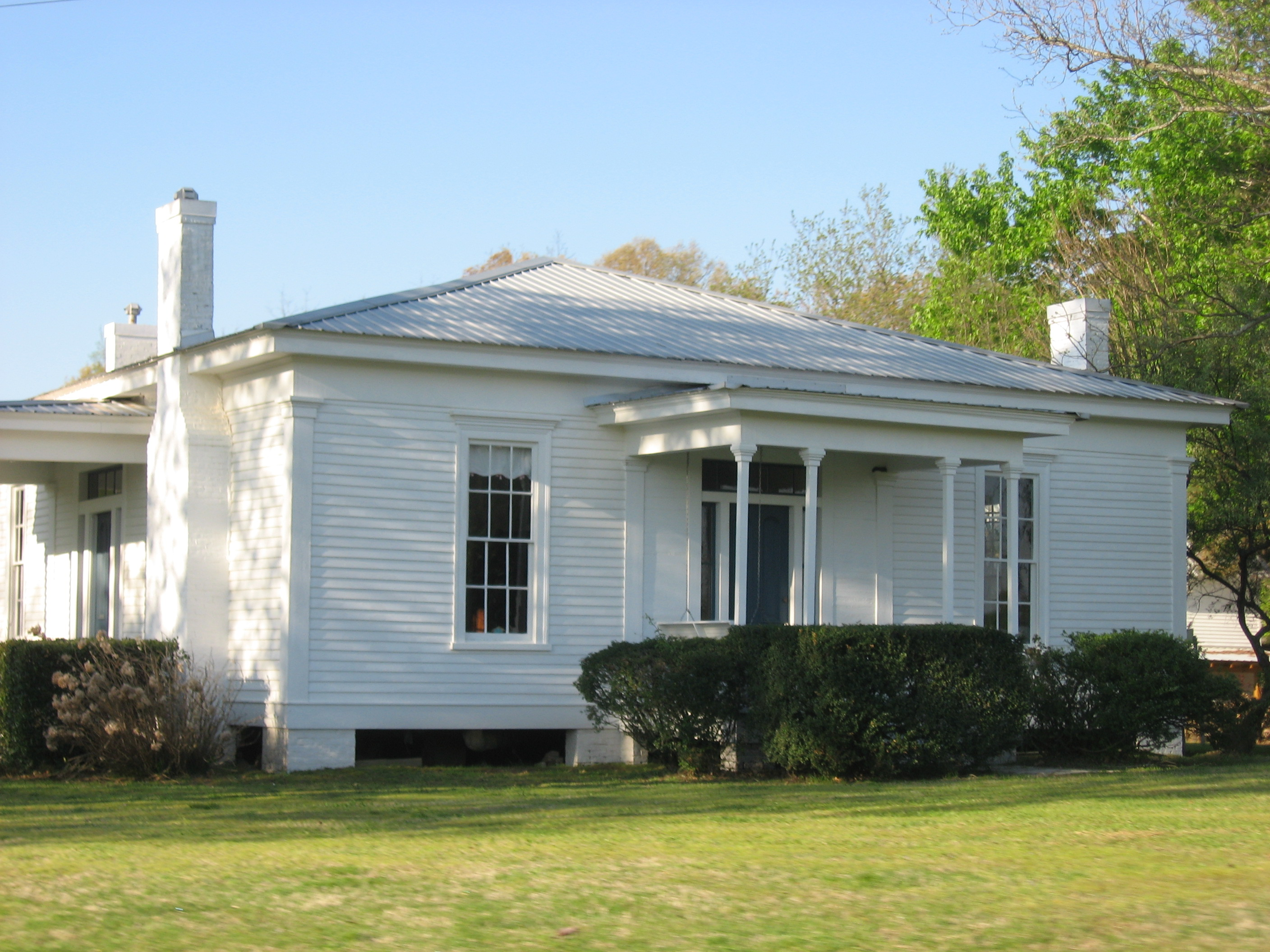

- Location within Tennessee
- Nearest city: Jacks Creek, Tennessee
- Coordinates: 35°29′20″N 88°31′17″W
- Area: 5 acres (2.0 ha)
- Built: c.1867
- Built by: Hamlett, Joel Flippant
- Architectural style: Greek Revival
- NRHP reference No.: 83004227
- Added to NRHP: December 1, 1983

The Hamlett-Smith House, on Jacks Creek-Mifflin Road about 3 miles (4.8 km) from the community of Jacks Creek, Tennessee, was built around 1867. It was listed on the National Register of Historic Places in 1983. The listing included four contributing buildings, two contributing structures, and a contributing object.

It was listed for its architecture and for its association with early settler and farmer Joel Flippant Hamlett. It is one of the oldest houses in Chester County, which was settled later than most other areas in the state.

The house, designed and built by Hamlett, is a small farm house with elements of Greek Revival style, combined with "West Tennessee vernacular influences". It has two small porches with slim, square Tuscan colonettes, and it has a simple box cornice in its eaves. Its pyramidal roof has composition shingles, installed after a 1945 tornado damaged the earlier metal roof. Its framing is white oak; weatherboards are blue poplar.

The property includes a smokehouse.
