= Long Rock Methodist Episcopal Church, South =

Historic church in Tennessee, United States

Coordinates: 36.0497°N 88.4008°W

- U.S. National Register of Historic Places
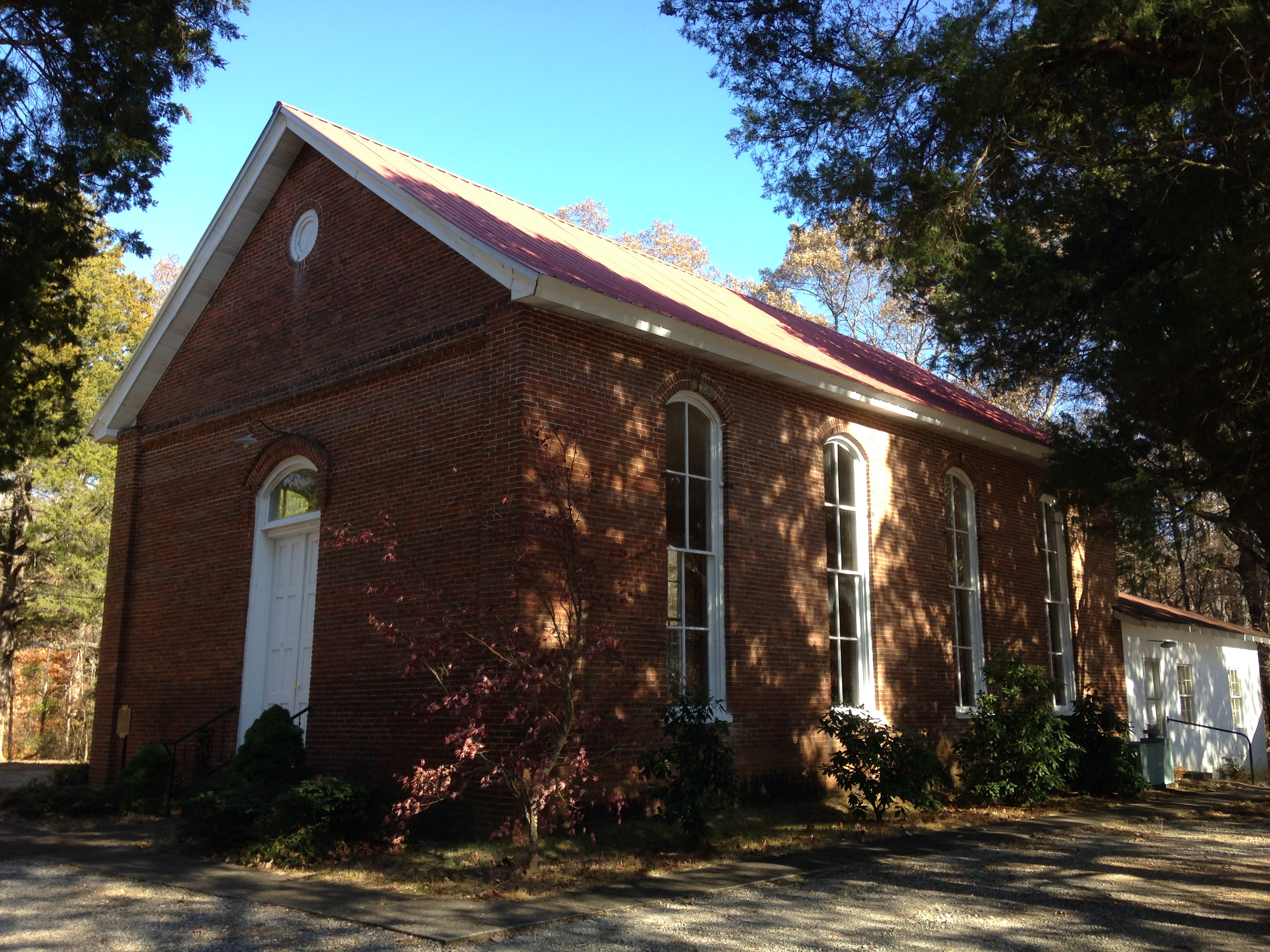

- Location within Tennessee Location within the United States
- Location: 340 Long Rock Church Rd, Huntingdon, Tennessee
- Built: 1886
- NRHP reference No.: 10000466
- Added to NRHP: July 16, 2010

Long Rock Methodist Episcopal Church, South, also known as Long Rock United Methodist Church, is a historic church in rural Carroll County, Tennessee.

The church building was built in 1886 and was listed on the National Register of Historic Places in 2010. In addition to its use as a Methodist church, it has a history of importance to its community as a venue for meetings, community singing, homecomings, and circuit church events. The Tennessee Historical Commission describes it as a "good example" of rural church architecture of the 19th century, with solid brickwork, a gabled façade with a segmental arch entry, and large segmental arched windows with multiple lights.
