= Hamilton–Lay Store =

- U.S. National Register of Historic Places
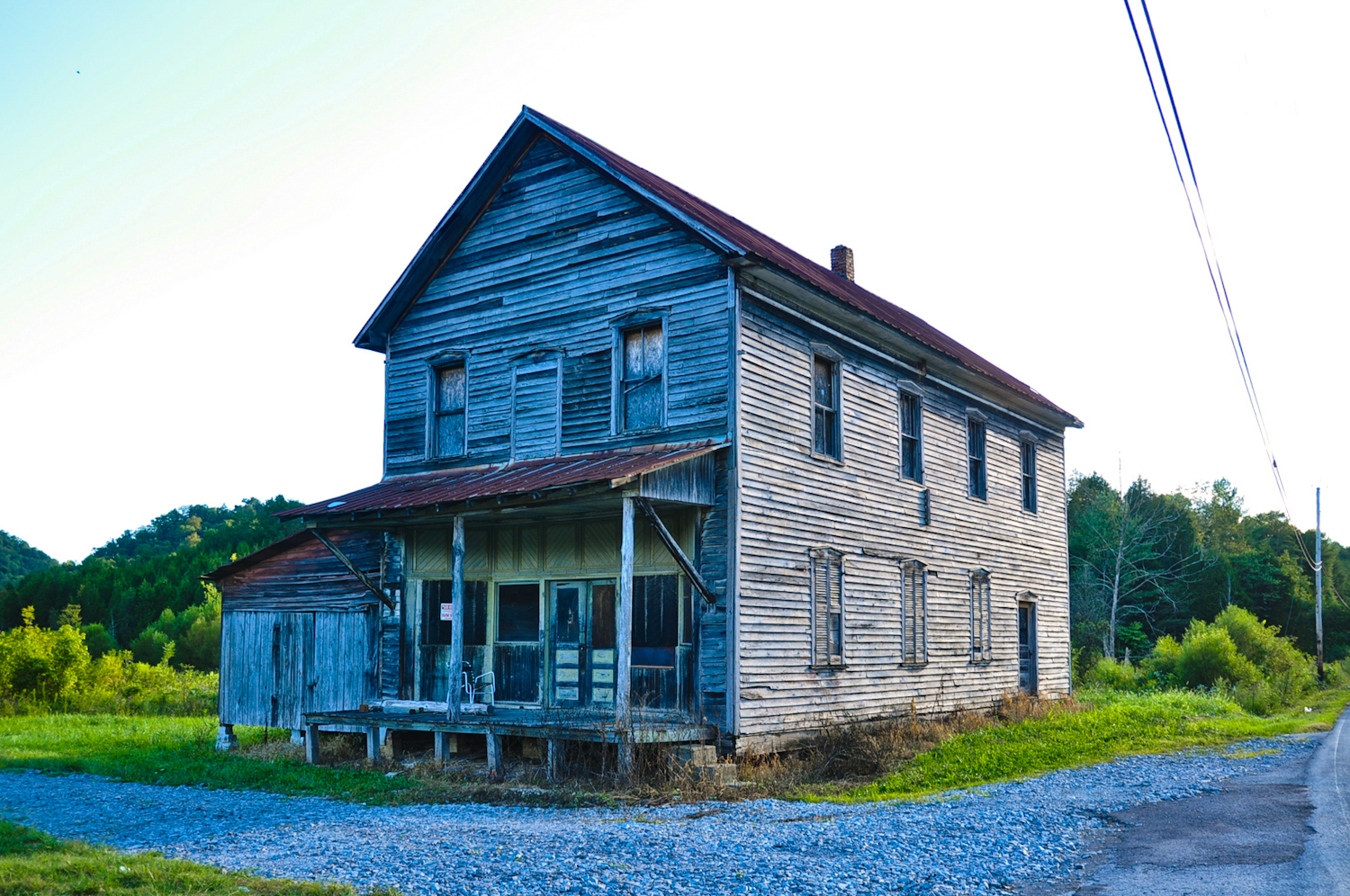

- Location within Tennessee
- Location: Intersection of Mill Pond Hollow Rd and Walkers Ford Rd, Maynardville vicinity, Tennessee
- Coordinates: 36°16′4″N 83°44′24″W
- NRHP reference No.: 11000084
- Added to NRHP: March 15, 2011

The Hamilton–Lay Store, also known as the Hamilton Crossroads Store, is a historic country general store at Hamilton Crossroads (the intersection of Mill Pond Hollow Road and Walkers Ford Road) in Union County, Tennessee, near Maynardville. The two-story wooden building was built in the 1840s and listed on the National Register of Historic Places in 2011.

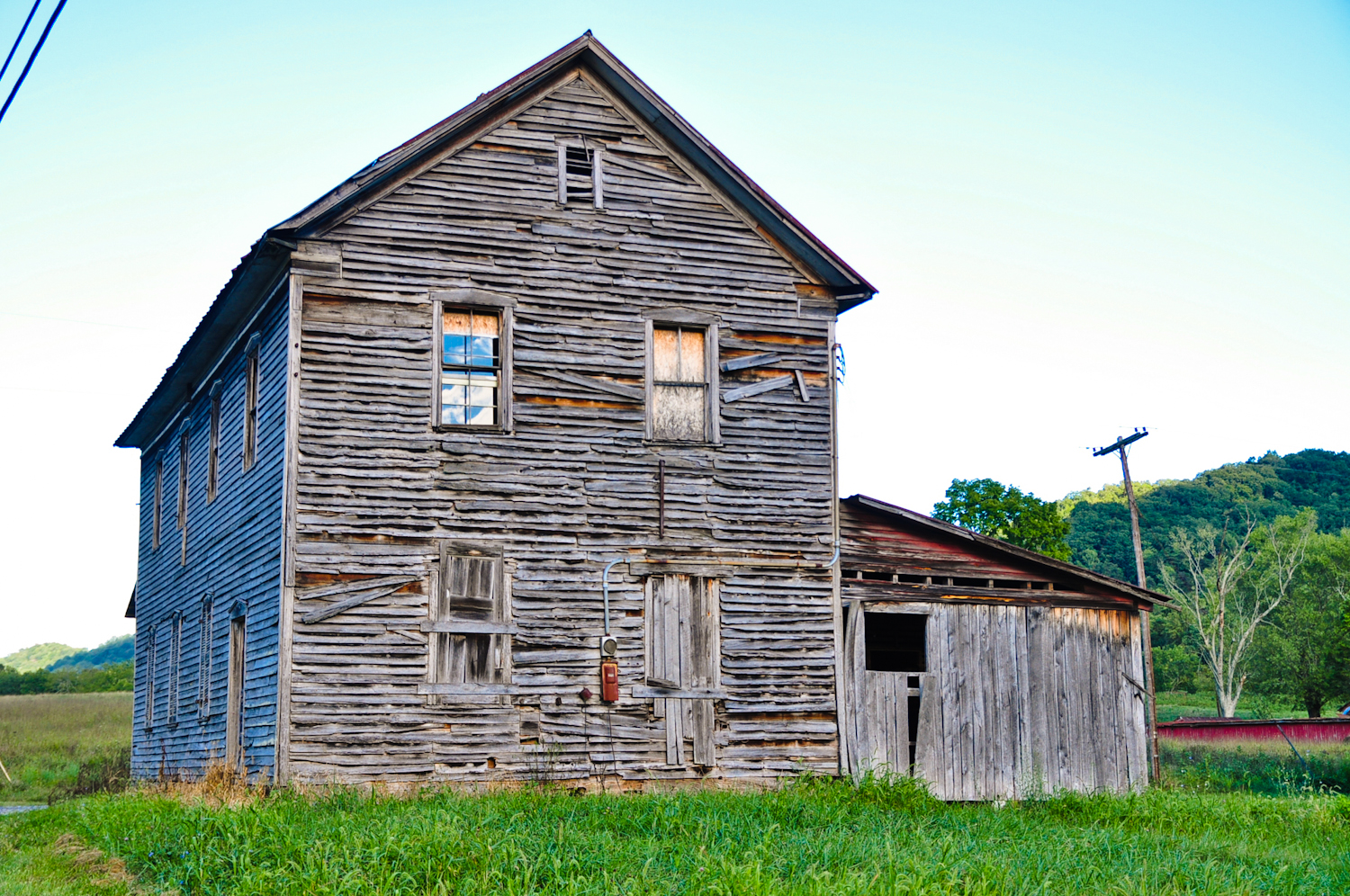
Rear view of the Hamilton–Lay Store
