= Meady White House =

- U.S. National Register of Historic Places
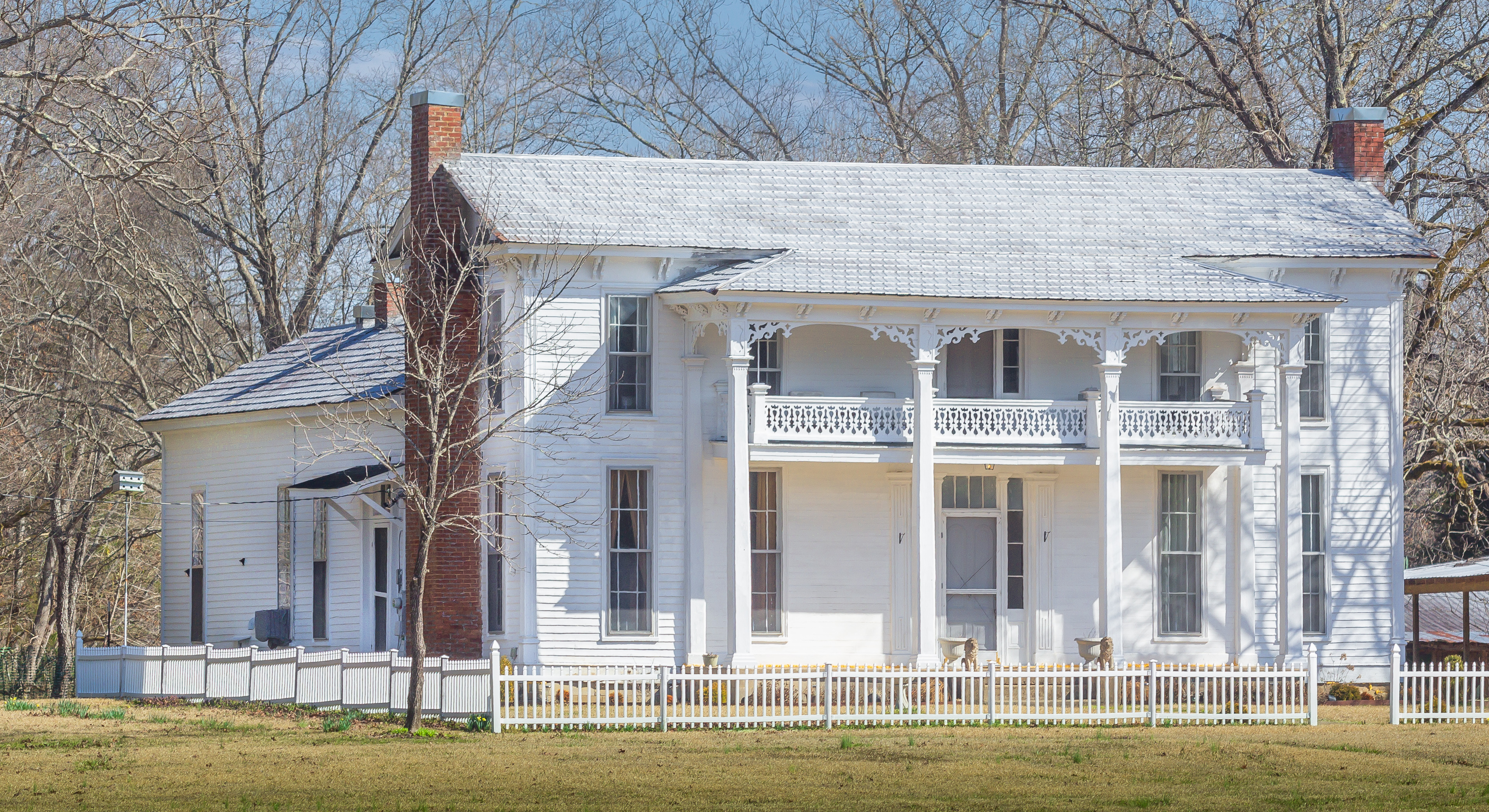

- Location within Tennessee Location within the United States
- Location: 47915 Main St. (TN 69), Saltillo, Tennessee
- Coordinates: 35°22′39″N 88°12′31″W
- Area: 4.7 acres (1.9 ha)
- Built: 1847
- Architectural style: Greek Revival, Italianate, Vernacular, I-house
- NRHP reference No.: 93000586
- Added to NRHP: July 1, 1993

The Meady White House is a historic house in Saltillo, Tennessee, U.S..

== History ==
The house was built in 1847 by slaves for Meady White, who lived here with his family. White lost some of his slaves in 1858 due to a lawsuit; they were auctioned in Savannah. After the American Civil War of 1861–1865, White purchased land in Decatur County. By the 1880s, he was a "farmer, large landowner, tanyard owner, dry goods store owner, cotton mill owner, stave business owner, and a horse breeder." White lived in the house until he died in 1889. It was sold out of the White family in 1913.

== Architectural significance ==
The house was designed in the Greek Revival and Italianate architectural styles. The ceilings were painted by John Joseph Christie in 1872–1877. It has been listed on the National Register of Historic Places since July 1, 1993.
