= Ready-Cates Farm =

Historic house in Tennessee, United States

- Ready--Cates Farm
- U.S. National Register of Historic Places
- U.S. Historic district
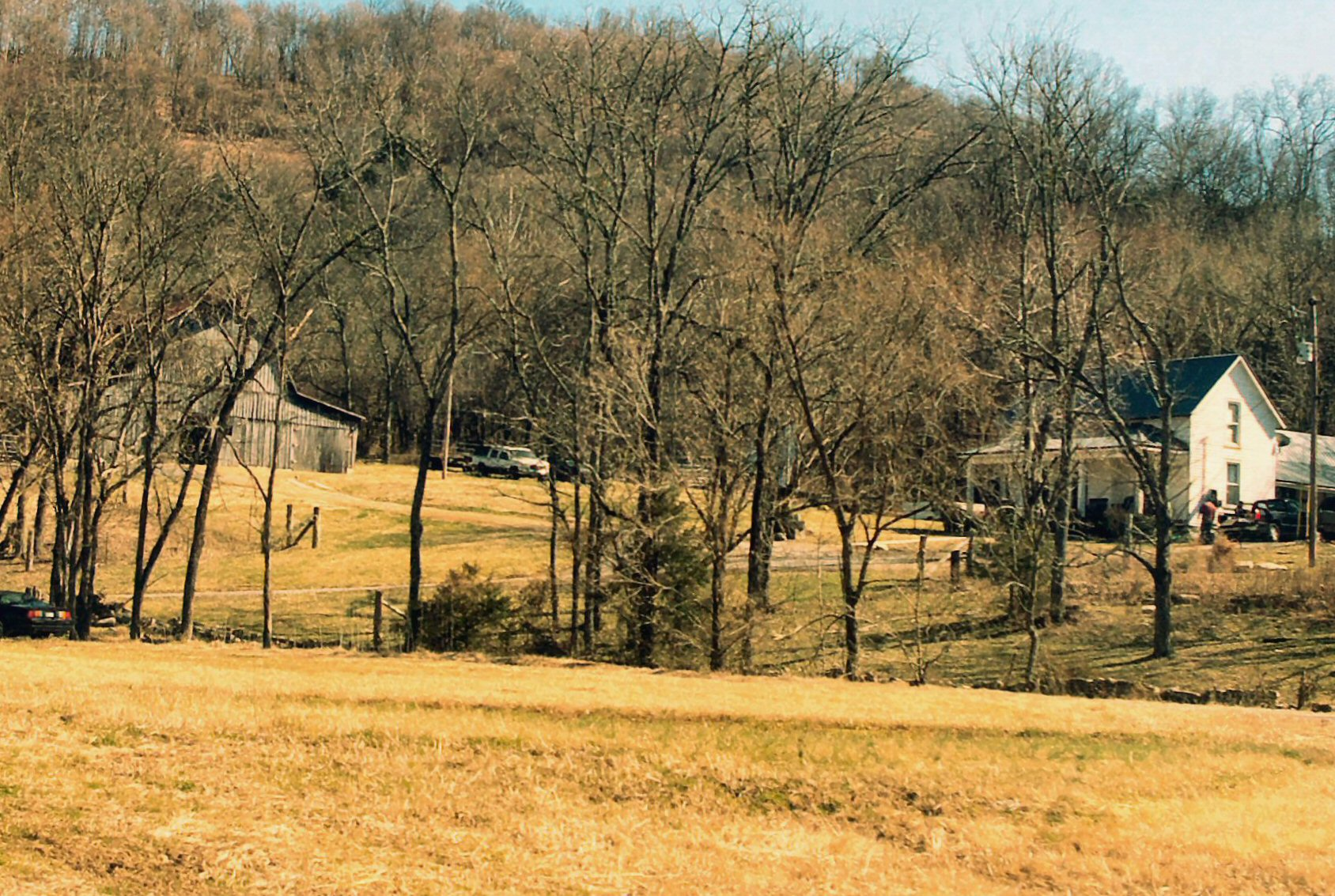
- Location: 1662 Northcutt Road, Milton, Tennessee
- Area: 162 acres (66 ha)
- Built: 1870
- Architectural style: T-Plan
- MPS: Historic Family Farms in Middle Tennessee MPS
- NRHP reference No.: 05000760
- Added to NRHP: July 27, 2005

The Ready-Cates Farm is a historic farmhouse in Milton, Tennessee, U.S.. It was built circa 1870 for Christopher Columbus Ready and his wife, Mary Annis. Ready used the farm to grow wheat and corn, and raise hogs, horses and cattle. It was inherited by their son, Irvin Ernest Ready, in 1898. It has been listed on the National Register of Historic Places since July 27, 2005.
