= Hamilton-Tolliver Complex =

- U.S. National Register of Historic Places
- U.S. Historic district
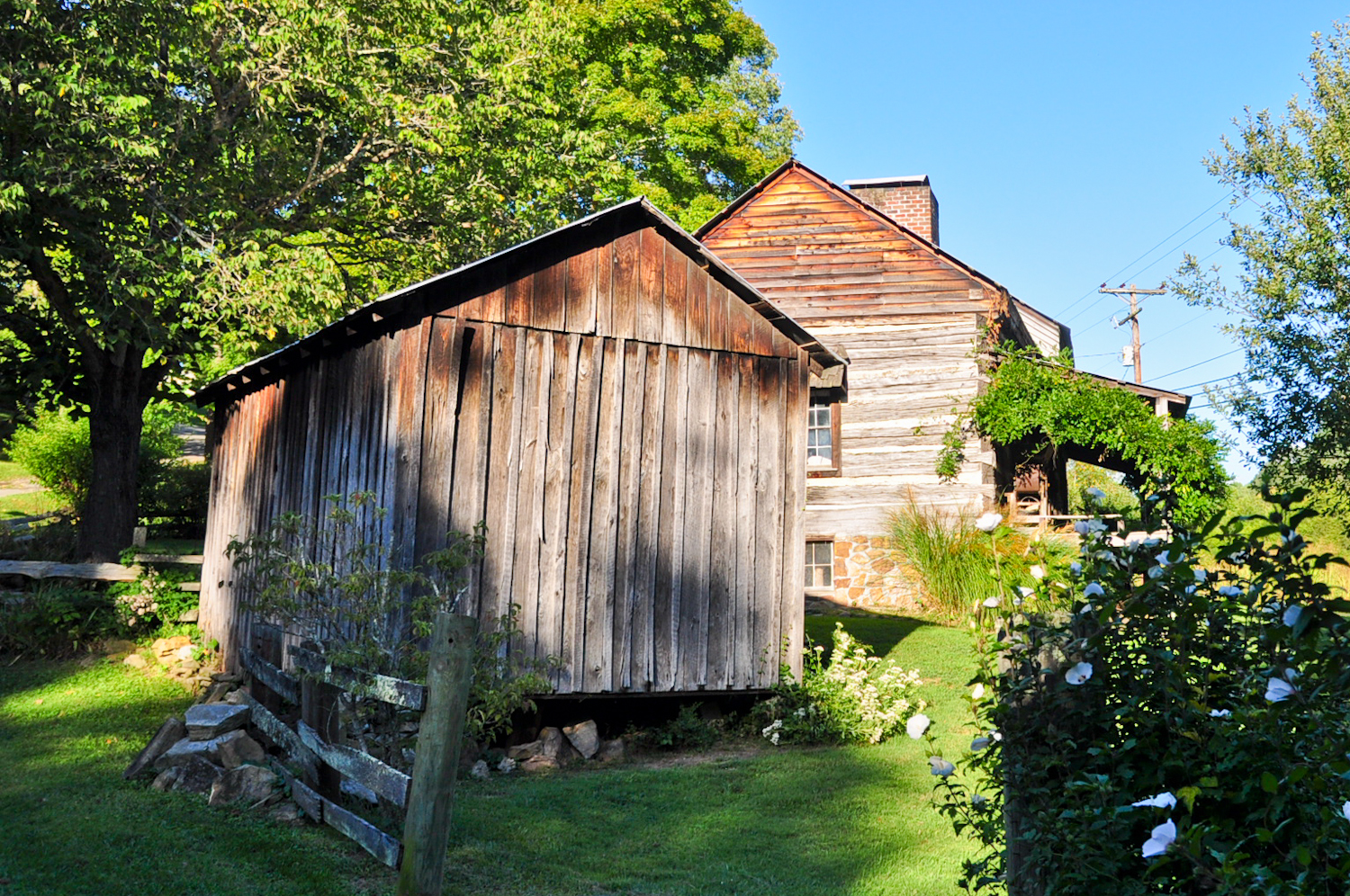

- Location within Tennessee Location within the United States
- Nearest city: Maynardville, Tennessee
- Coordinates: 36.28868°N 83.7545°W
- Area: 30 acres (12 ha)
- Architectural style: Saddlebag, side gable
- NRHP reference No.: 10000087
- Added to NRHP: March 12, 2010

The Hamilton-Tolliver complex is a historic district in Union County, Tennessee, that is listed on the National Register of Historic Places.

The complex is located on 30 acres (12 ha) of farmland and woodland. It is centered on a log residence built some time around the 1830s. Other structures in the historic district include a store, the remains of a tomato cannery, a smokehouse, and a privy. The store and cannery included in the complex represent the ways that farmers in the area earned their livelihoods through a combination of farming and commercial business activities.
