= A.E. Perkins House =

Historic house in Tennessee, United States

- A. E. Perkins House
- U.S. National Register of Historic Places
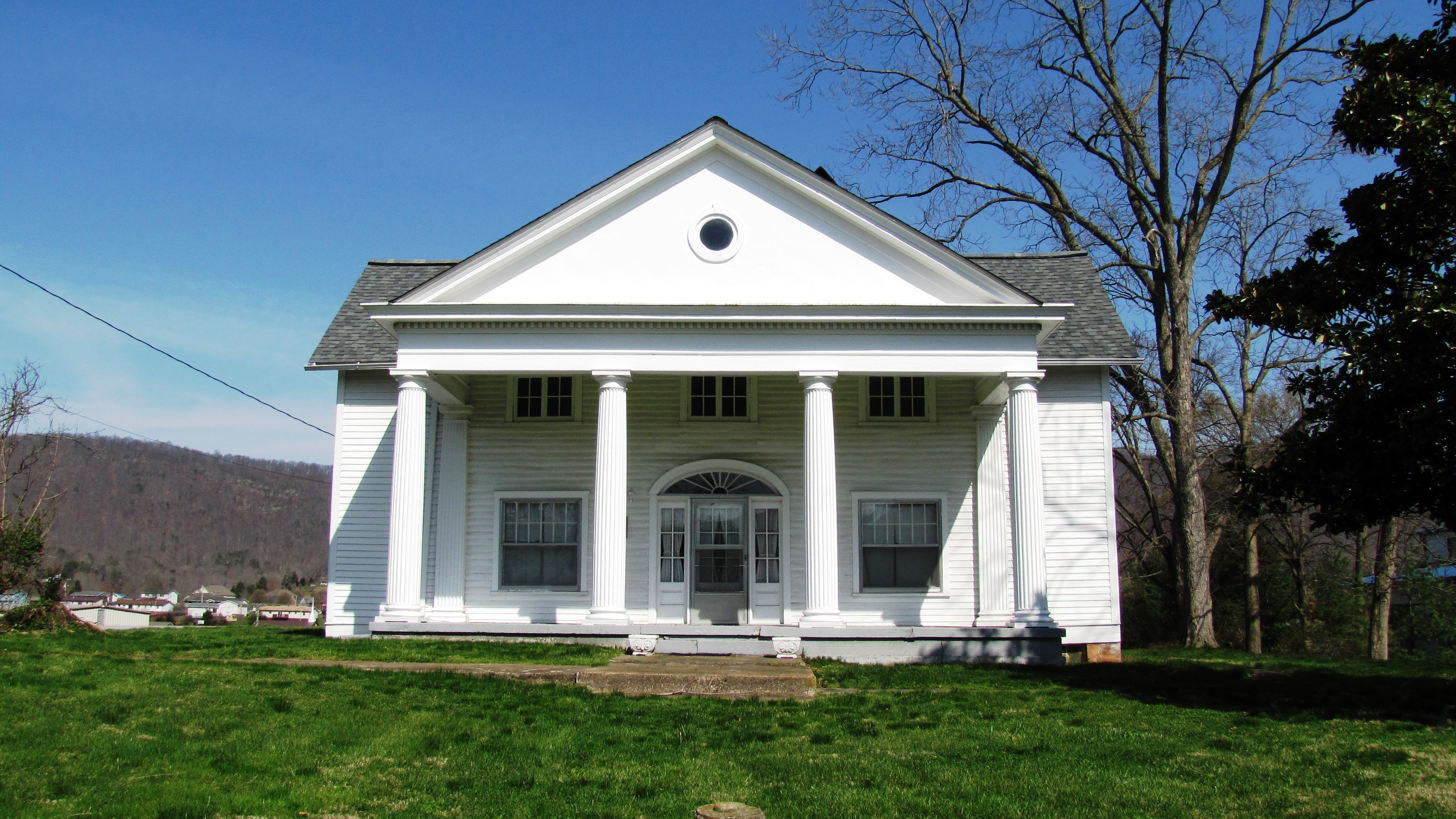
- The A. E. Perkins House in 2010

- Location within Tennessee
- Location: 130 Valley Street, Jacksboro, Tennessee
- Coordinates: 36°19′55″N 84°10′50″W
- Area: 1.1 acres (0.45 ha)
- Built: 1850
- Architectural style: Late 19th And 20th Century Revivals, Colonial Revival
- NRHP reference No.: 97001529
- Added to NRHP: December 8, 1997

The A. E. Perkins House is a historic house in Jacksboro, Tennessee, U.S.. The house was built circa 1850 for James Williams and his wife, Rebecca. It remained in the Williams family until 1930, when it was purchased by Alexander Early Perkins.

The house was first built as in the I-house style circa 1850. It was redesigned in the Colonial Revival architectural style in 1930. It has been listed on the National Register of Historic Places since December 8, 1997.
