= Hufstedler Gravehouse =

Historic cemetery in Tennessee, United States

- U.S. National Register of Historic Places
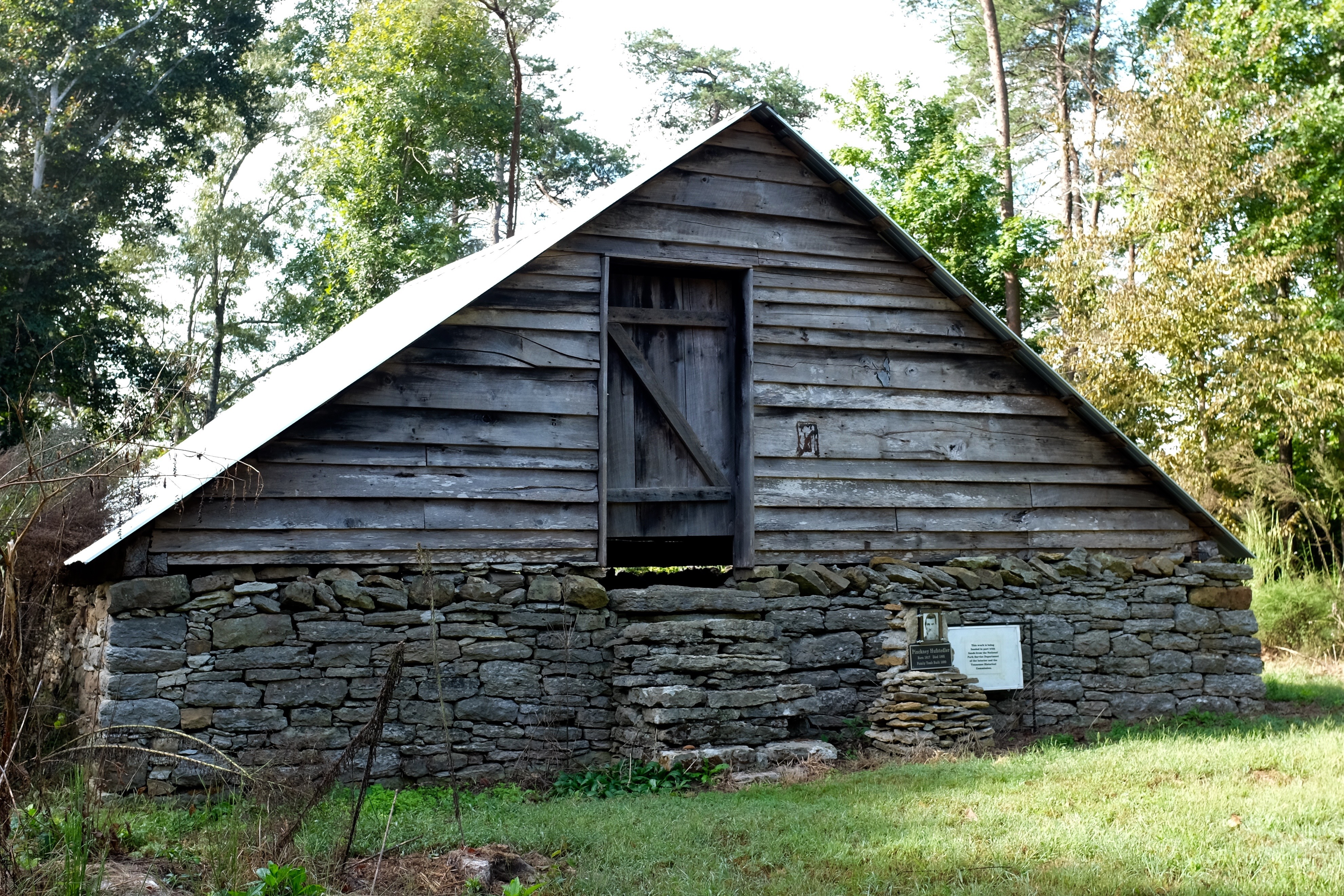

- Location within Tennessee Location within the United States
- Nearest city: Linden, Tennessee
- Coordinates: 35°33′58″N 87°49′27″W
- Area: less than one acre
- Built: 1885
- NRHP reference No.: 87001038
- Added to NRHP: June 25, 1987

Hufstedler Gravehouse or Pinckney's Tomb is a grave shelter, or grave house, near Linden, Tennessee, that is considered to be the largest grave house in the U.S. state of Tennessee. It is listed on the National Register of Historic Places.

== Overview ==
The grave house is a limestone and wood structure that covers the burial site of local farmer Pinckney Hufstedler and members of his family. It was originally built as a graveyard for about 10 to 12 burials, surrounded by a wall of cut stone almost 5 feet (1.5 m) high. Wooden walls and a roof were added because of Pinckney Hufstedler's fears that water could get into his tomb. Hufstedler also asked that his body be transported to the burial site in a wagon drawn by white oxen, rather than mules.

== History ==
The structure is deemed to be a rare example of vernacular rural cemetery architecture of the 19th century. It was listed on the National Register of Historic Places in 1987.

=== Endangered historical site ===
In 2009, the Tennessee Preservation Trust listed it as one of the state's ten most endangered historic sites, noting that the foundation was beginning to fail.
