= John P. Rains Hotel =

- U.S. National Register of Historic Places
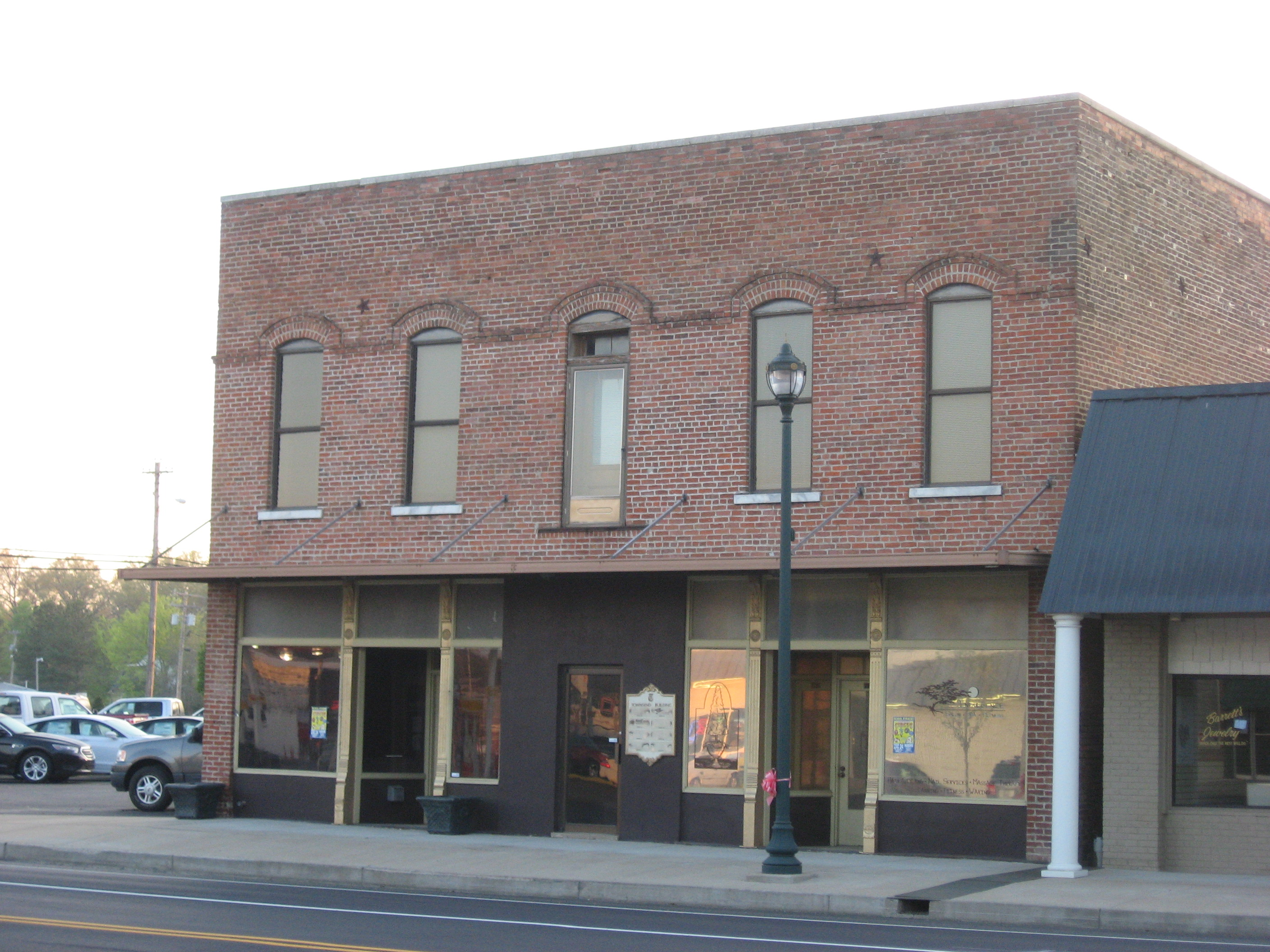
- Front of the hotel

- Location within Tennessee Location within the United States
- Location: 106-108 Tennessee Ave., S., Parsons, Tennessee
- Coordinates: 35°38′58″N 88°07′35″W
- Area: 0.3 acres (0.12 ha)
- Built: 1898
- NRHP reference No.: 78002585
- Added to NRHP: November 21, 1978

The John P. Rains Hotel, located at 106-108 Tennessee Ave., S. in Parsons in Decatur County, Tennessee, was built in 1898. It has also been known as the Colwick Hotel. It was listed on the National Register of Historic Places in 1978.

It was built when the Tennessee Midland Railway Company built a line connecting Lexington with Perryville during 1888–89, and operated until about 1950, past the closing of rail service in 1936.

The building is the oldest commercial building in Parsons, because it is the sole survivor of a series of fires that destroyed all other nineteenth-century commercial buildings.
