= Reynoldsburg-Paris Road =

- U.S. National Register of Historic Places
- Location within Tennessee
- Location: 5.0 miles northeast of Camden off Chestnut Hill Rd., near Camden, Tennessee
- Coordinates: 36.1°N 87.976667°W
- Area: 16.7 acres (6.8 ha)
- Built: 1838
- NRHP reference No.: 05000803
- Added to NRHP: August 7, 2005

Reynoldsburg-Paris Road, in Benton County, Tennessee near Camden, Tennessee, was listed on the National Register of Historic Places in 2005. It runs through woodland within the Nathan Bedford Forrest State Park. It is a dirt-surfaced road about 10 to 18 feet wide.

It is a Trail of Tears site.

It was traversed by about 1,200 Cherokee led by John Benge in November 1838. The section of roadbed "possesses a strong sense of time and place from the period of the Trail of Tears of 1838."

It preserves a section of the historic Renyoldsburg-Paris Road. The area includes a 1.3-mile section of intact road running from near the Tennessee River to Chestnut Hill Road. The boundaries include the entire roadbed and all of the property tracts associated with the road.

The site includes one contributing structure, the road.
