= Long Creek School (Lafayette, Tennessee) =

- Formerly listed on the U.S. National Register of Historic Places
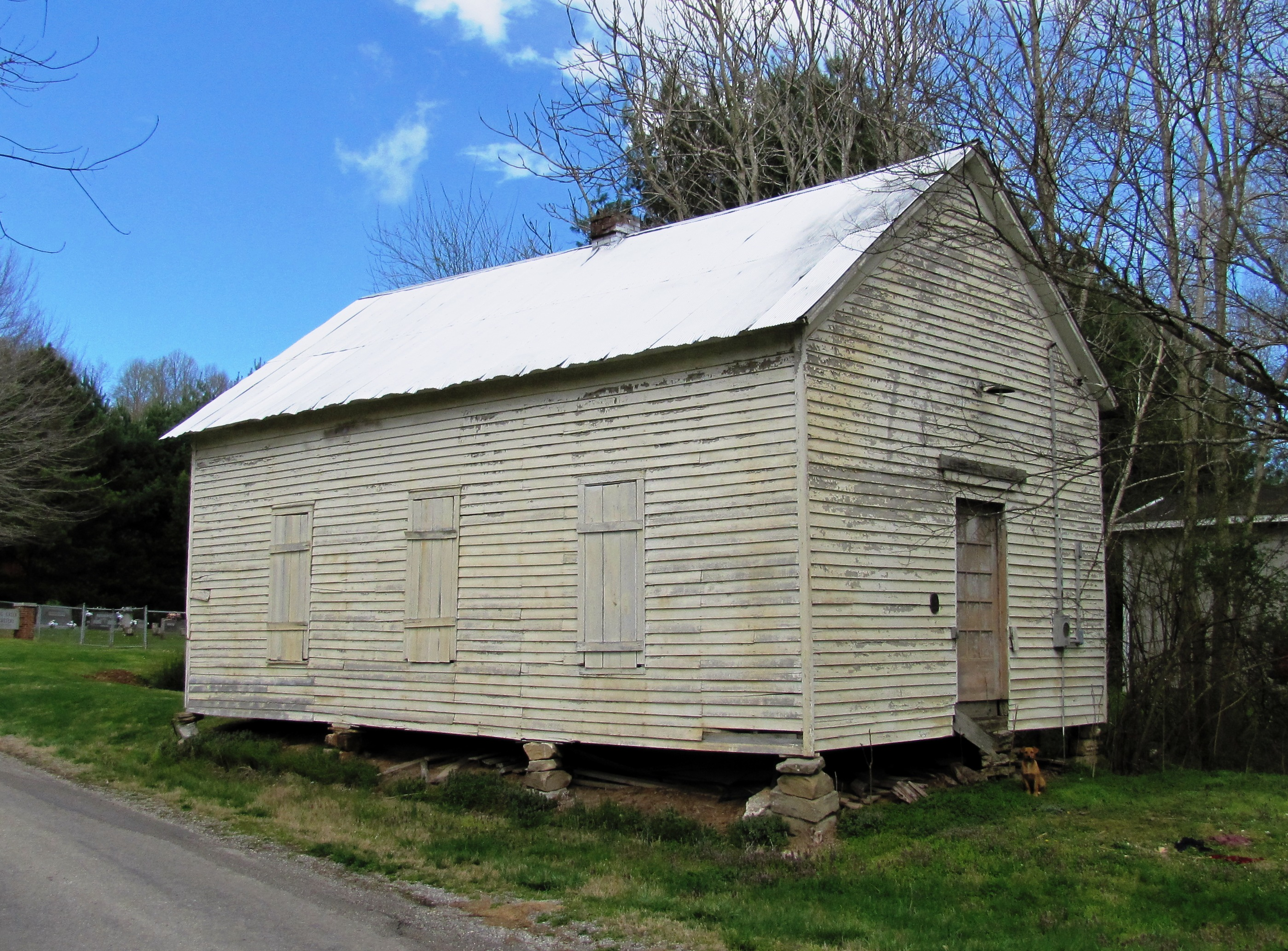
- The building in 2010

- Location within Tennessee
- Nearest city: Lafayette, Tennessee
- Coordinates: 36°33′27″N 86°05′38″W
- Area: 0.3 acres (0.12 ha)
- Built: 1885
- Architectural style: Schoolhouse
- MPS: Education Related Properties of Macon County MPS
- NRHP reference No.: 93000032

Significant dates
- Added to NRHP: February 22, 1993
- Removed from NRHP: March 24, 2025

The Long Creek School is a historic building in Lafayette, Tennessee. It was built circa 1885 on land that belonged to the Johnson family. It was moved 25 feet west to its current location circa 1923. It closed down in 1950, and later served as a community meeting place. It was listed on the National Register of Historic Places in 1993, and was delisted in 2025.
