= James R. DeBow House =

Historic house in Tennessee, United States

- U.S. National Register of Historic Places
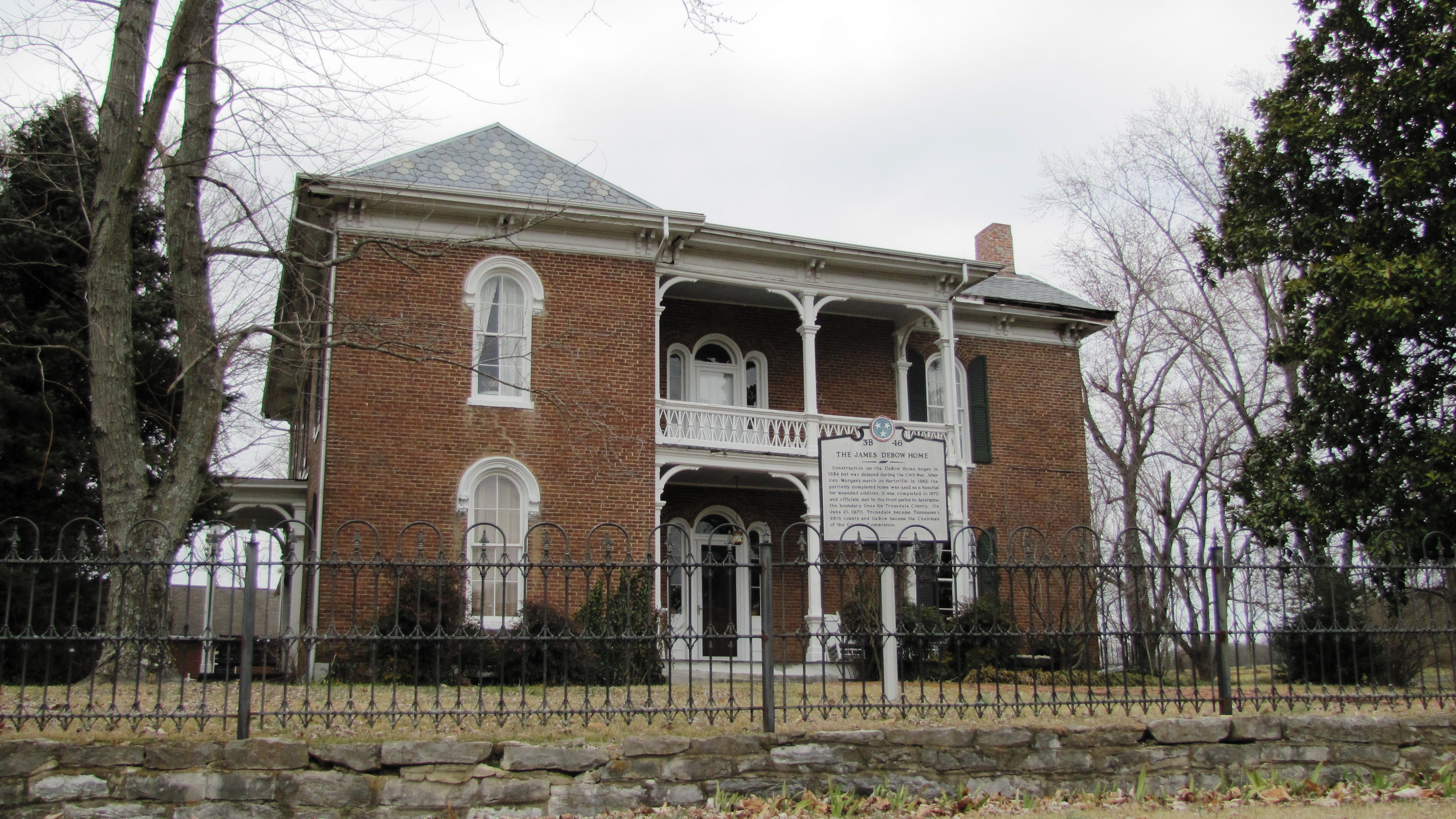
- The James R. DeBow House in 2010

- Location within Tennessee Location within the United States
- Nearest city: Hartsville, Tennessee
- Coordinates: 36°23′2″N 86°7′16″W
- Area: 3 acres (1.2 ha)
- Built: 1854
- Architectural style: Italianate
- NRHP reference No.: 88002381
- Added to NRHP: November 3, 1988

The James R. DeBow House, also known as Vinewood, is a historic house in Hartsville, Tennessee, U.S.. It was built from 1854 to 1870 for James R. DeBow, who inherited the land from his father (himself inheriting it from DeBow's grandfather, American Revolutionary War veteran Frederick DeBow). The house was designed in the Italianate architectural style. During the American Civil War of 1861–1862, the partially completed house was used as a hospital for the Union Army. By the late 1800s, it was purchased by merchant James R. Andrews, followed by Noel Coleman Winston in 1904. It has been listed on the National Register of Historic Places since November 3, 1988.
