= Rucker-Mason Farm =

Historic house in Tennessee, United States

- Rucker--Mason Farm
- U.S. National Register of Historic Places
- U.S. Historic district
- Nearest city: Porterfield, Tennessee
- Area: 314 acres (127 ha)
- Built: 1800
- Architectural style: Federal, Greek Revival
- MPS: Historic Family Farms in Middle Tennessee MPS
- NRHP reference No.: 06001234
- Added to NRHP: January 9, 2007

The Rucker-Mason Farm is a historic farmhouse in Cannon County, Tennessee, U.S.. It was built circa 1800 for Gideon Rucker. It was acquired by his brother, Bennett Rucker, in 1817. By 1840, he owned 14 slaves. The farm remained in the Rucker family until 1902.

The house was first designed in the Federal architectural style circa 1800. A Greek Revival portico was built circa 1840. It has been listed on the National Register of Historic Places since January 9, 2007.
