= List of United States post offices in Tennessee =

United States post offices operate under the authority of the United States Post Office Department (1792–1971) or the United States Postal Service (since 1971). Historically, post offices were usually placed in a prominent location. Many were architecturally distinctive, including notable buildings featuring Beaux-Arts, Art Deco, and Vernacular architecture. However, modern U.S. post offices were generally designed for functionality rather than architectural style.

Following is a list of United States post offices in Tennessee. Notable post offices include individual buildings, whether still in service or not, which have architectural, historical, or community-related significance. Many of these are listed on the National Register of Historic Places (NRHP) or state and local historic registers.

Post office	City	Date built	Image	Architect	Notes	Ref.
United States Post Office (Bolivar, Tennessee)	Bolivar	1940		Louis A. Simon, Neal A. Melick	(Note: Houses the New Deal mural Picking Cotton by Carl Nyquist.)	
United States Post Office-Shelby Street Station	Bristol	1900		James Knox Taylor	(Note: Listed on the National Register of Historic Places)	
United States Post Office (Brownsville, Tennessee)	Brownsville	1935–1936			(Note: Houses the New Deal mural Mail Delivery to Tranquility by John H. Fyfe.)	
United States Post Office (Camden, Tennessee)	Camden	1936–1937		Louis A. Simon, Neal A. Melick	(Note: Houses the New Deal mural Mail Delivery to Tranquility by John H. Fyfe.)	
U.S. Post Office, now the Joel W. Solomon Federal Building and United States Courthouse	Chattanooga	1932–1933		R. H. Hunt		
Old Post Office (Chattanooga, Tennessee)	Chattanooga	1891–1893		unknown	(Note: No longer used as a post office.)	
Clarksville Federal Building, now Customs House Museum and Cultural Center	Clarksville	1897–1898		William Martin Aiken, David A. Murphy		
Federal Building (Clarksville, Tennessee)	Clarksville	1935		C. H. Lindsley	(Note: Originally housed two New Deal murals by F. Luis Mora, which were destroyed.)	
United States Post Office (Cleveland, Tennessee)	Cleveland	1910		James Knox Taylor		
United States Post Office (Clinton, Tennessee)	Clinton	1937		Louis A. Simon, Neal A. Melick	(Note: Originally housed the New Deal mural Farm and Factory by Horace Day, which has since moved to the new post office building.)	
United States Post Office and Court House (Columbia, Tennessee), now Federal Building	Columbia	1941–1942		Louis A. Simon, Neal A. Melick, William Dewey Foster	(Note: Houses the New Deal mural Maury County Landscape by Henry Billings and the limestone sculpture American Eagle by Sidney Waugh.)	
United States Post Office and Court House (Cookeville, Tennessee), now L. Clure Morton United States Post Office and Courthouse	Cookeville	1916		Oscar Wenderoth		
United States Post Office (Crossville, Tennessee), now Milo Lemert Memorial Building	Crossville	1940		Louis A. Simon, Neal A. Melick	(Note: Originally housed the New Deal mural The Partnership of Man and Nature by Marion Greenwood, which has since moved to the new post office building.)	
United States Post Office (Dayton, Tennessee), now Dayton Electric & Water Building	Dayton	1937		Louis A. Simon, Neal A. Melick	(Note: Houses the New Deal mural View from Johnson’s Bluff by Bertram Hartman.)	
United States Post Office (Decherd, Tennessee)	Decherd	1939–1940		Louis A. Simon, Neal A. Melick	(Note: Houses the New Deal mahogany relief, News on the Job, by Enea Biafora.)	
Dickson Post Office	Dickson	1936		Louis A. Simon, Neal A. Melick	(Note: Houses the New Deal mural People of the Soil by Edwin Boyd Johnson.)	
United States Post Office (Dresden, Tennessee)	Dresden	1936–1937		Louis A. Simon, Neal A. Melick	(Note: Houses the New Deal mural Retrospection by Minetta Good.)	
United States Post Office (Elizabethton, Tennessee), now the Elizabethton-Carter County Library	Elizabethton	1931–1932		James A. Wetmore		
United States Post Office (Erwin, Tennessee)	Erwin	1936		Louis A. Simon, Neal A. Melick		
United States Post Office (Gleason, Tennessee)	Gleason	1940		Louis A. Simon, Neal A. Melick	(Note: Houses the New Deal mural Gleason Agriculture by Anne Poor.)	
United States Post Office and Court House (Jackson, Tennessee), now Ed Jones Federal Building and U.S. Courthouse	Jackson	1931–1933		James A. Wetmore		
United States Post Office (Jefferson City, Tennessee)	Jefferson City	1939–1940		Louis A. Simon, Neal A. Melick	(Note: House the New Deal mural Great Smokies and Tennessee Farms by Charles Child.)	
United States Post Office and Mine Rescue Station	Jellico	1915		Oscar Wenderoth, W. H. Fissell		
United States Post Office (Johnson City, Tennessee)	Johnson City	1937		Lorimer Rich	(Note: Originally housed a New Deal mural, which was moved to the new post office building.)	
Old Post Office Building (Knoxville, Tennessee)	Knoxville	1869–1873		Alfred B. Mullett		
United States Post Office and Courthouse (Knoxville, Tennessee)	Knoxville	1934		Baumann and Baumann		
United States Post Office (LaFollette, Tennessee)	LaFollette	1936		Louis A. Simon, Neal A. Melick	(Note: Houses the New Deal mural On the Shores of the Lake by Dahlov Ipcar.)	
United States Post Office (Lawrenceburg, Tennessee)	Lawrenceburg	1935		Louis A. Simon, John W. Wolcott Jr.		
United States Post Office (Lenoir City, Tennessee)	Lenoir City	1938		Louis A. Simon, Neal A. Melick	(Note: Houses the New Deal mural Electrification by David Stone Martin.)	
United States Post Office (Lewisburg, Tennessee)	Lewisburg	1935			(Note: Originally housed the New Deal mural Coming ‘Round the Mountain by John H. R. Pickett, later moved to the new post office building.)	
Old Post Office (Lexington, Tennessee), now Beech River Heritage Museum	Lexington	1937		Louis A. Simon, Neal A. Melick		
United States Post Office (Livingston, Tennessee)	Livingston	1936–1937		Louis A. Simon, Neal A. Melick	(Note: Houses the New Deal mural The Newcomers by Margaret Covey Chisholm.)	
United States Post Office (Manchester, Tennessee)	Manchester	1940		Louis A. Simon	(Note: Originally housed the New Deal mural Horse Swapping Day by Minna Citron, later moved to the new post office building.)	
United States Post Office (Martin, Tennessee)	Martin	1917–1918		James A. Wetmore		
United States Post Office (McKenzie, Tennessee)	McKenzie	1935		Louis A. Simon, Neal A. Melick	(Note: Houses the New Deal mural Early U.S. Post Village by Karl Oberteuffer.)	
United States Post Office-Main	McMinnville	1931		W. C. Stone, Neal A. Melick		
United States Post Office-Front Street Station	Memphis	1876		James G. Hill		
United States Post Office (Milan, Tennessee)	Milan	1936		Louis A. Simon		
United States Post Office (Morristown, Tennessee), now Henry Street Station	Morristown	1915		Oscar Wenderoth	(Note: Contributing structure of the Morristown Main Street Historic District.)	
United States Post Office (Mt. Pleasant, Tennessee)	Mt. Pleasant	1940		Louis A. Simon, Neal A. Melick	(Note: Houses the New Deal mural Early Settlers Entering Mt. Pleasant by Eugene Higgins.)	
United States Post Office (Nashville, Tennessee), now Frist Art Museum	Nashville	1932–1934		Marr & Holman		
United States Post Office (Newport, Tennessee)	Newport	1937		Louis A. Simon, Neal A. Melick		
United States Post Office at Old Hickory	Old Hickory	1934		Louis A. Simon		
United States Post Office (Ripley, Tennessee)	Ripley	1938		Louis A. Simon, Neal A. Melick	(Note: Houses the New Deal mural Autumn by Marguerite Zorach.)	
Rockwood Post Office	Rockwood	1937		Louis A. Simon, Neal A. Melick	(Note: Houses the New Deal bas relief Wild Life by Christian Heinrich.)	
Old Post Office (Savannah, Tennessee), now Tennessee River Museum	Savannah	1939		Louis A. Simon, Neal A. Melick		
United States Post Office, now Sevier County Heritage Museum	Sevierville	1940		Louis A. Simon, Neal A. Melick		
United States Post Office (South Pittsburg, Tennessee)	South Pittsburg	1934–1935		Emil C. Seiz Jr., G. W. Stone		
United States Post Office (Sparta, Tennessee)	Sparta			Louis A. Simon, Neal A. Melick		
United States Post Office (Sweetwater, Tennessee)	Sweetwater	1940		Louis A. Simon, Neal A. Melick	(Note: Houses the New Deal mural Wild Boar Hunt by Thelma Martin.)	
United States Post Office (Trenton, Tennessee)	Trenton	1935		Louis A. Simon, George O. Von Nerta		
United States Post Office (Union City, Tennessee)	Union City	1912–1913		James Knox Taylor		
