= Tennessee House of Representatives 60th district =

State legislative district in Tennessee

Tennessee's 60th State House of Representatives district
- Map of Tennessee House districts with the 60th District shaded in red
Representative
Shaundelle Brooks; D–Hermitage
- Demographics: 61.4% White; 20.8% Black; 11.1% Hispanic; 2.9% Asian; 4.3% Multiracial
- Population (2024): 79,241

Tennessee House of Representatives District 60 is one of the 99 legislative districts in the Tennessee House of Representatives. The district covers eastern Davidson County, including portions of Nashville neighborhoods such as Hermitage, Donelson, and Old Hickory. It is bounded on the north by Old Hickory Lake and the south by Percy Priest Lake The district has been represented by Shaundelle Brooks since 2024. The district is considered slightly competitive. In 2024, Kamala Harris won the district by 10.5%

== Demographics ==
According to the 2024 American Community Survey, District 60 had a population of approximately 79,241.

- 61.4% of the district is White
- 20.8% of the district is African American
- 11.1% of the district is Hispanic
- 2.2% of the district is Asian
- 0.2% of the district is some other race
- 4.3% of the district is Two or more races

Detailed demographic information for the district is also available through Census Reporter.

== History ==
The 60th District was first constituted at the time of the 88th Tennessee General Assembly, prior, Davidson County had many numbered districts.

== List of Representatives ==
Shaundelle Brooks is an American politician serving as a member of the Tennessee House of Representatives from the 60th district. A member of the Democratic Party, Brooks was elected in 2024.

Representative	Party	Years of service	Hometown
Shaundelle Brooks	Democratic	January 15, 2025 – present	Hermitage
Darren Jernigan	Democratic	2013 - 2024	Hermitage
Jim Gotto	Republican	2011 – 2012	Hermitage
Ben West Jr.	Democratic	1984 - 2010	Hermitage
Elmer W. Disspayne	Democratic	1978 - 1984	Hermitage
Elliot Ozment	Democratic	1976 - 1978	Hermitage
John T. Hicks	Democratic	1966 - 1976	Hermitage

== Elections ==
=== 2024 ===
2024 Tennessee House of Representatives District 60 general election
Party	Candidate	Votes	%
Democratic	Shaundelle Brooks	16,681	53.8
Republican	Chad Bobo	14,335	46.2
Total votes		31,016	100.0
Democratic hold			

=== 2022 ===
2022 Tennessee House of Representatives District 60 general election
Party	Candidate	Votes	%
Democratic	Darren Jernigan	11,201	60.2
Republican	Christopher Huff	7,405	39.8
Total votes		18,606	100.0
Democratic hold			

=== 2020 ===
2020 Tennessee House of Representatives District 60 general election
Party	Candidate	Votes	%
Democratic	Darren Jernigan	23,220	100.0
Total votes		23,220	100.0
Democratic hold			

=== 2018 ===
2018 Tennessee House of Representatives District 60 general election
Party	Candidate	Votes	%
Democratic	Darren Jernigan	18,362	100.0
Total votes		18,362	100.0
Democratic hold			

=== 2016 ===
2016 Tennessee House of Representatives District 60 general election
Party	Candidate	Votes	%
Democratic	Darren Jernigan	15,103	56.14
Republican	Steve Glover	11,799	43.86
Total votes		26,902	100.0
Democratic hold			

=== 2014 ===
2014 Tennessee House of Representatives District 60 general election
Party	Candidate	Votes	%
Democratic	Darren Jernigan	8,415	53.4
Republican	Jim Gotto	7,339	46.6
Total votes		15,754	100.0
Democratic hold			

=== 2012 ===
2012 Tennessee House of Representatives District 60 general election
Party	Candidate	Votes	%
Democratic	Darren Jernigan	12,310	50.2
Republican	Jim Gotto	12,215	49.8
Total votes		24,525	100.0
Democratic gain from Republican			

=== 2010 ===
2010 Tennessee House of Representatives District 60 general election
Party	Candidate	Votes	%
Republican	Jim Gotto	8,795	51.38
Democratic	Sam Coleman	8,322	48.62
Total votes		17,117	100.0
Republican gain from Democratic			

=== 2008 ===
2008 Tennessee House of Representatives District 60 general election
Party	Candidate	Votes	%
Democratic	Ben West Jr.	18,690	65.85
Republican	Ron Hickman	9,693	34.15
Total votes		28,383	100.0
Democratic hold			

=== 2006 ===
2006 Tennessee House of Representatives District 60 general election
Party	Candidate	Votes	%
Democratic	Ben West Jr.	12,402	67.03
Republican	Juan C. Borges	6,099	32.97
Total votes		18,501	100.0
Democratic hold			

=== 2004 ===
2004 Tennessee House of Representatives District 60 general election
Party	Candidate	Votes	%
Democratic	Ben West Jr.	21,315	100.0
Total votes		21,315	100.0
Democratic hold			

=== 2002 ===
2002 Tennessee House of Representatives District 60 general election
Party	Candidate	Votes	%
Democratic	Ben West Jr.	11,734	71.42
Republican	Dave Backs	4,696	28.58
Total votes		16,430	100.0
Democratic hold			

=== 2000 ===
2000 Tennessee House of Representatives District 60 general election
Party	Candidate	Votes	%
Democratic	Ben West Jr.	15,142	72.75
Republican	Dave Backs	5,672	27.25
Total votes		20,814	100.0
Democratic hold			
