= 2007 Nashville mayoral election =

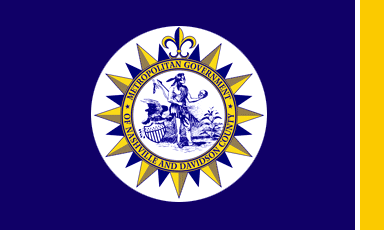
- August 2, 2007 (primary); September 11, 2007 (runoff)
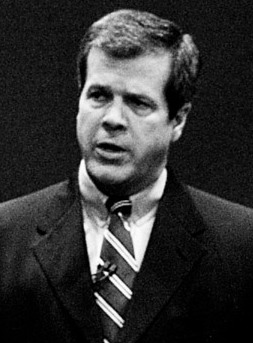

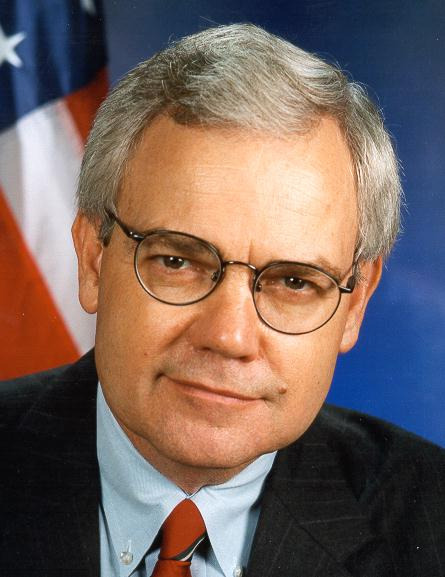

Candidate	Karl Dean	Bob Clement
Party	Nonpartisan	Nonpartisan
First round	24,122; 24.08%	23,575; 23.53%
Runoff	51,946; 52.25%	47,347; 47.62%
Candidate	Howard Gentry Jr.	Buck Dozier
Party	Nonpartisan	Nonpartisan
First round	23,180; 23.14%	17,738; 17.70%
Mayor before election
Bill Purcell
Nonpartisan
Elected Mayor
Karl Dean
Nonpartisan

The 2007 Nashville mayoral election took place on September 11, 2007, following a primary election on August 2, 2007. Incumbent Mayor Bill Purcell was term-limited and could not seek a third term. A crowded field emerged to succeed him, which included Law Department Director Karl Dean, former Congressman Bob Clement, Vice Mayor Howard Gentry Jr., and Metro Councilmen Buck Dozier and David Briley. In the primary election, Dean narrowly placed first, winning 24 percent of the vote. In second place, Clement won 23.5 percent and narrowly beat out Gentry, who won 23.1 percent.

In the runoff, Dean narrowly defeated Clement, winning 52 percent of the vote to Clement's 48 percent.

== Primary election ==
=== Candidates ===
- Karl Dean, Director of the Metro Law Department
- Bob Clement, former U.S. Representative from Tennessee's 5th congressional district, 2002 Democratic nominee for the U.S. Senate
- Howard Gentry Jr., Vice Mayor
- Buck Dozier, Metro Councilman
- David Briley, Metro Councilman
- Ken Eaton, businessman
- Cheryl Tisdale, school employee

==== Declined ====
- Torry Johnson, 20th Judicial District Attorney General

=== Polling ===
Poll source	Date(s) administered	Sample size (Note: Key: A – all adults RV – registered voters LV – likely voters V – unclear)	Margin of error	David Briley	Bob Clement	Karl Dean	Buck Dozier	Kenneth Eaton	Howard Gentry Jr.	Cheryl Tisdale	Undecided
SurveyUSA	July 19–22, 2007	564 (LV)	± 4.2%	12%	23%	21%	16%	1%	21%	1%	5%

=== Results ===
2007 Nashville mayoral primary election results
Party	Candidate	Votes	%
Nonpartisan	Karl Dean	24,122	24.08%
Nonpartisan	Bob Clement	23,575	23.53%
Nonpartisan	Howard Gentry Jr.	23,180	23.14%
Nonpartisan	Buck Dozier	17,738	17.70%
Nonpartisan	David Briley	10,880	10.86%
Nonpartisan	Ken Eaton	351	0.35%
Nonpartisan	Cheryl Lynn Tisdale	288	0.29%
Write-in		57	0.06%
Total votes		100,191	100.00%

== Runoff election ==
=== Polling ===
Poll source	Date(s) administered	Sample size	Margin of error	Bob Clement	Karl Dean	Undecided
SurveyUSA	September 3–5, 2007	536 (LV)	± 4.3%	46%	48%	6%

=== Results ===
2007 Nashville mayoral runoff election results
Party	Candidate	Votes	%
Nonpartisan	Karl Dean	51,946	52.25%
Nonpartisan	Bob Clement	47,347	47.62%
Write-in		130	0.13%
Total votes		99,423	100.00%
