= Karl Dean =

American politician

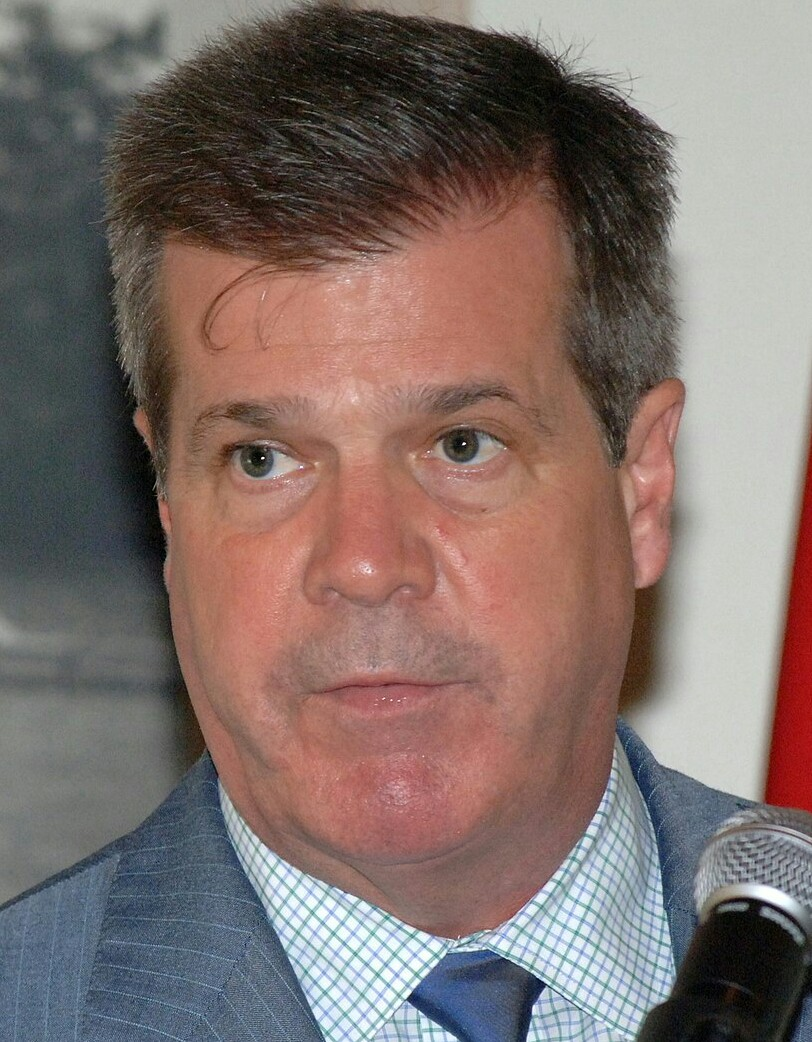

6th Mayor of Metropolitan Nashville
- In office September 21, 2007 – September 25, 2015
- Deputy: Diane Neighbors
- Preceded by: Bill Purcell
- Succeeded by: Megan Barry

Personal details
- Born: Karl Foster Dean; September 20, 1955 (age 70) Sioux Falls, South Dakota, U.S.
- Party: Democratic
- Spouse: Anne Davis (m. 1983)
- Children: 3
- Education: Columbia University (BA); Vanderbilt University (JD)

Karl Foster Dean (born September 20, 1955) is an American politician who served as the 6th Mayor of Nashville, Tennessee from 2007 to 2015. A member of the Democratic Party, he previously served as Nashville's Director of Law under Mayor Bill Purcell from 1999 to 2007. In 1990, 1994 and 1998, he was elected the city's public defender. Dean, an attorney by occupation, is currently an adjunct professor of law at Vanderbilt University Law School.

He graduated with a Bachelor of Arts degree from Columbia University in 1978 and a Juris Doctor from Vanderbilt University in 1981. His campaign message for Mayor of Nashville focused on improving education, public safety and economic development saying "it's all connected." During Dean's first year in office, he reworked the arrangement between Metro and the Nashville Predators in order to keep the team in Nashville. During Dean's first term, he faced two major challenges: the Great Recession and the 2010 Tennessee floods. During his two terms in office, Dean transformed Downtown Nashville by adding a new minor league baseball stadium, a riverfront amphitheater and park and a new convention center dubbed Music City Center. Dean was friendly towards business and often used tax incentives to lure companies to Nashville. He is also involved in conservationist efforts of historical areas such as Music Row through his involvement with Music Industry Coalition. He helped preserve historic sites such as RCA Studio A.

In 2017, Dean declared his candidacy for Governor of Tennessee in the 2018 election. In the first three months of the campaign, Dean raised $1.2 million and spent $200,000; he went on to win the Democratic nomination on August 2, 2018 and advanced to the general election. Dean lost the election to businessman Bill Lee.

== Legal opinions as Metro Law Director ==
In March 2005, Karl Dean wrote that Mayor Bill Purcell could seek a third term, despite a 1994 referendum on "any elected office authorized or created by the [Metro] charter." This was because the 1963 charter states that there is a three-term limit for mayors, the 1994 amendment took place against a backdrop of a push for congressional term limits, and local public discussion focused on the Metro Council. In January 2003, he said a proposed law to ban job discrimination on the basis of sexual orientation was not unconstitutional.

When Metro Council members' health-care benefits came under scrutiny in September 2004, because the Metro Charter does not allow pension benefits for Council members, Dean said that a health-care benefit wouldn't legally fall under a pension benefit, and therefore wouldn't be against the Charter.

When asked if an amendment to the Metropolitan Charter requiring raises in the maximum property tax rates approved by the Metro Council to also be approved by Metro voters, Dean believed that a court was likely to find that provision of the Metro Charter invalid. He claimed this is because the Tennessee General Assembly has not authorized the charter of the consolidated government to restrict the authority of a legislative body to levy an ad valorem tax on property.

== Mayor of Nashville ==
=== Elections ===
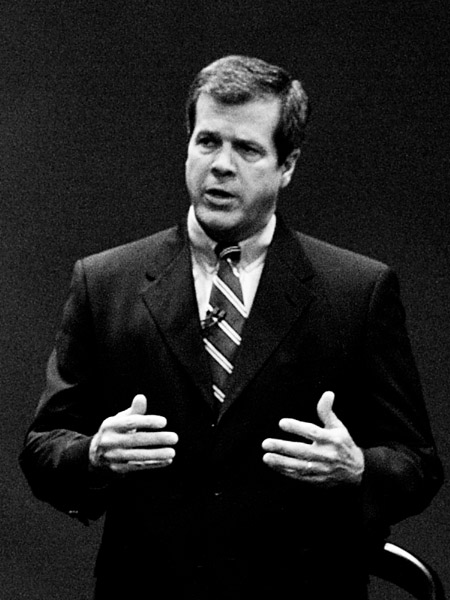
Dean at a 2007 Nashville mayoral debate

Dean announced his mayoral candidacy on December 19, 2006. His campaign message focused on improving education, public safety, and economic development saying "it's all connected." The platform for his campaign stated that there are "three pitches you have to hit every day: public education, economic opportunity development and public safety.” In the general election on August 2, 2007, he placed first with 24.6% of the vote. This advanced him to a run-off election against Bob Clement. On September 11, 2007 Dean won the run-off election with 52.2% of the vote.

Dean easily won re-election in August 2011 with 79.2% of the vote.

Dean left office on September 25, 2015. He was succeeded by Megan Barry, the first woman to be Mayor of Nashville.

=== Education policy ===
During Dean's two terms, the budget for Metro Nashville schools increased by $218 million (37 percent) and Nashville schools saw increased graduation rates, reduced dropout rates, and improved test scores. He created the Limitless Libraries program, which connects Nashville Public Libraries to Metro Nashville Schools, part of a greater push to enable opportunities for under-served schools in the city.

Dean also improved school choice by recruiting charter schools to the city and augmented teaching talent by partnering with Teach for America. As a part of this partnership, summer academies were created.

=== Economic development ===
Dean's tenure as mayor marked sales taxes revenue increased by over $100 million (36 percent), indicative of the growth of Nashville as a major city. One of the marquee projects of Dean's mayoral career was overseeing the creation of Music City Center, a massive convention center that has generated over $735 million in revenue for the city. Other projects included the construction of Ascend Amphitheater and First Tennessee Park, public venues that bring in millions of dollars of revenue to the city and have been instrumental in the expansion of downtown Nashville. Finally, Dean incentivized businesses to relocate to Nashville, including Bridgestone Americas and HCA.

==== Great Recession ====
Dean led Nashville during the Great Recession. At that time, the city experienced 7 years of GDP growth and an increase of $35 billion (45 percent) in that time. Nashville has had one of the most successful recoveries from the recession. By the end of Dean's mayoral term, Nashville had added the third highest percentage employment since its lowest point in the recession out of all cities in the US, adding over 144,300 jobs (19.3 percent employment growth).

=== Crime and safety ===
With public safety as one of Dean's primary campaign promises, Dean increased the size of the Nashville police force by 13.5 percent. In conjunction with this, Dean opened two new precincts to more equally distribute areas of coverage and started Nashville's first DNA crime lab. By 2013, Nashville had reached the lowest crime numbers and homicide rate in its history.

=== Environment ===
Dean's time as mayor was accompanied by increased construction of greenway and bike paths around the city of Nashville. He added over 4,000 acres of park land and created the city's Office of Environment and Sustainability. As a result of his efforts, curbside recycling was expanded around the Metro area and the city moved in a more green direction.

== 2018 gubernatorial campaign ==
Final results by county in 2018: Bill Lee: 80–90%; 70–80%; 60–70%; 50–60%; Karl Dean: 60–70%; 50–60%

On February 26, 2017, Dean announced he would run for Governor of Tennessee in the 2018 election as a Democrat. He cast himself as a pro-business moderate running on a message of education, jobs, and healthcare in Tennessee.

In the first three months of the campaign, Dean raised $1.2 million and spent $200,000, making him the third most funded candidate for governor behind Republicans Randy Boyd & Bill Lee.

Dean easily won the primary election over long-time state representative Craig Fitzhugh, earning over 75% of the primary vote.

In the general election, Dean was defeated handily by Bill Lee, a native Tennessean who inherited his father's plumbing and contracting business and won victory as a first-time candidate who has never held elective office.

Lee defeated Dean in the November 6 general election, receiving 1,336,106 votes (59.5%) to Dean's 864,863 votes (38.5%).

== Personal life ==
Dean has been married to Anne Davis, a prominent Tennessee lawyer, since August 6, 1983. Anne Davis is a relative of Joe C. Davis Jr. and Rascoe Davis and is a proprietor of the Joe C. Davis Foundation in Nashville. Both Anne and Karl are Catholic. Dean and his wife have three children, Rascoe, Frances, and Wallen.

Dean was born in Sioux Falls, South Dakota, was raised primarily in Gardner, Massachusetts, and graduated from Gardner High School in 1974.

Political offices
Preceded by Bill Purcell	Mayor of Nashville; 2007–2015	Succeeded by Megan Barry
Party political offices
Preceded by Charles Brown	Democratic nominee for Governor of Tennessee; 2018	Succeeded by Jason Martin
