= Metro Council =

Metro Council can refer to:

- Louisville Metro Council in Louisville, Kentucky
- Metropolitan Council (Minnesota) in the Minneapolis-St. Paul metropolitan area
- Metropolitan Council (Davidson County) in Nashville and Davidson County, Tennessee
- Metropolitan Toronto Council in Toronto, Ontario, Canada
- The governing body of Metro (Oregon regional government) in the Portland area
