= Nashville Christian School =

Location
- 7555 Sawyer Brown Road; Nashville, Tennessee; United States of America; 36.1068°N 86.9318°W

Information
- Type: co-ed, private, Early Education through 12th
- Motto: "And Jesus increased in wisdom, and in stature, and in favor with God and man." Luke 2:52
- Religious affiliation: Churches of Christ
- Established: 1971
- President: Connie Jo Shelton
- Faculty: 55.6 (on an FTE basis)
- Enrollment: 721 (including 200 PK) (2017–18)
- Student to teacher ratio: 9.4
- Campus: suburban
- Colors: Navy Blue, Orange and White
- Mascot: Eagle
- Website: http://nashvillechristian.org

Nashville Christian School (or simply Nashville Christian) is a co-ed private Christian school for ages six weeks through 12th grade located in Bellevue, a neighborhood of Nashville, Tennessee. The school was founded in 1971 as white families sought to avoid having their children bussed across the city with black children during the court ordered desegregation of Nashville public schools.

== History ==
Nashville Christian School opened on September 20, 1971, in the West Nashville Heights Church of Christ building. The school was founded as a segregation academy by white parents seeking to avoid sending their children to racially integrated public schools. In 1976, headmaster Daryl Demonbreun recalled that the school was not "only formed to avoid integration" but that "bussing was only the straw that broke the camel's back." In 1976 the school moved to a new location on Sawyer Brown Road in Bellevue. As of 1980, the school had no black students. In 1991 Buck Dozier, the president of the school, served as a member of a coalition to end court-ordered busing.

== Academics ==
Nashville Christian serves as a college preparatory school to its high school students. The curriculum features twenty-seven college credits in English, math, history, and speech. Honors, dual enrollment, and Advanced Placement classes are also offered.

== Extracurricular activities ==
=== Athletics ===
Nashville Christian's athletic teams, which were added within two years of its establishment, originally bore the nickname "Pioneers", until the student body voted to change the nickname to the "Eagles" in 1972. Today Nashville Christian fields athletic teams at both the middle school and high school levels. They include:

- Varsity Baseball
- Varsity Basketball
- Varsity Football
- Varsity Softball
- Golf
- Track
- Wrestling
- Cross Country
- Soccer

== Controversy ==
In April 2023 the school banned a student from their senior prom for wearing a suit instead of a dress. The student posted an Instagram picture of themselves in front of the facility, holding a sign reading "they wouldn't let me in because i'm in a suit" and captioned "i should not have to conform to femininity to attend my senior prom. i will not compromise who i am to fit in a box. who are you to tell us what it means to be a woman?". The post quickly went viral. In response, the school stated that it "has established dress requirements for daily school attendance and at our special events. All students and families are aware of and sign an agreement to these guidelines when they enroll." Members of the local community decided to host an unofficial prom for the student and their friends.
