= Lockeland Springs =

Neighborhood of Nashville, Tennessee

Coordinates: 36.178°N 86.739°W

The Lockeland Springs historic neighborhood is a turn-of-the-20th-century streetcar suburb two miles northeast of downtown Nashville, Tennessee, in East Nashville.

There are over 1,500 households in the neighborhood. The neighborhood association was formed in 1978.

== History ==
In 1786, this land was granted by the State of North Carolina to Daniel Williams, in payment for his service in the Revolutionary War. The first house in the area was the log cabin Williams built on the site of the present Lockeland School.

The first mansion built in this area was named by Col. Robert Weakley after his wife Jane Locke Weakley's family in the early 19th century, thus naming Lockeland Springs.

Later, country estates dotted the landscape: Lockeland, Lynnlawn, Edgewood, and Springside, to name a few. Subdivision of these estates began in the 1870s, and the building of the Woodland Street Bridge in 1886 and the introduction of electric streetcars spurred suburban development. By 1890, electric streetcar lines linked east Nashville with downtown. Prior to this, only the wealthy could afford to commute from their estates to the other side of the Cumberland River. Access was further facilitated by the construction of the Shelby Street Bridge in 1909. Lockeland Springs was annexed to the City of Nashville in 1905.

During the Nashville Tornado Outbreak of 1998, many of the area's homes were damaged or destroyed.

The neighborhood was subsequently hit by the Nashville 2020 Tornado around 12:45 AM on March 3, 2020. The tornado, which passed through much of Nashville, was categorized as an EF3 when it passed through Lockeland Springs. The tornado travelled east to west, destroying several commercial buildings in Five Points, then damaging and destroying numerous homes along Woodland, Holly, Russell and Fatherland Streets. The historic Holly Street Fire Hall sustained extensive damage. The tornado then exited Lockeland Springs as it passed through the Shelby Golf Course and crossed Riverside Drive.

Former Nashville Mayor Bill Purcell resides in Lockeland Springs.
