= Shaundelle Brooks =

American politician (born 1972)

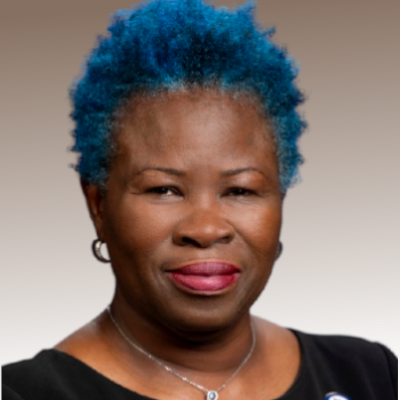

Member of the Tennessee House of Representatives from the 60th district
- Incumbent
- Assumed office January 14, 2025
- Preceded by: Darren Jernigan

Personal details
- Born: August 2, 1972 (age 54)
- Party: Democratic
- Children: 4
- Education: John Jay College of Criminal Justice (BA)
- Website: House website

Shaundelle Brooks (born August 2, 1972) is an American politician who has served in the Tennessee House of Representatives since 2025, where she represents the 60th district as a Democrat.

== Early life and education ==
Brooks was born on August 2, 1972. She was raised in Brooklyn by parents who were both police officers. She graduated with her BA in law and criminal justice from John Jay College of Criminal Justice. She later earned a graduate certificate in nonprofit management and an MPA from Tennessee State University.

== Tennessee House of Representatives (2025–present) ==
=== Elections ===
In 2024, Brooks ran to represent the 60th district in the Tennessee House of Representatives, held by retiring Democrat Darren Jernigan. In a three-way race, she won the Democratic primary with a narrow vote majority. She defeated Republican Chad Bobo in the general election by about seven points.

In 2026, Brooks was renominated in the Democratic primary. The district was viewed as a potential target for Republicans due to changing demographics. However, Brooks significantly expanded her vote margin from the previous cycle, winning re-election by defeating Republican Eva Romero.

=== Tenure ===
In 2025, Brooks proposed Akilah's Law, a bill criminalizing the sale, offer, delivery, or transfer of firearms to someone known to have been in a mental institution within the past five years.

== Personal life ==
Brooks lives in Hermitage, Tennessee. She has four children.

In 2018, Brooks' son Akilah DaSilva was a victim of the Nashville Waffle House Shooting. Five years later, the Covenant School shooting sent another son's school into active shooter lockdown. The incidents motivated Brooks to run for office on a platform of addressing gun violence.

== Electoral history ==
2024 Tennessee House of Representatives 60th district election
Primary election
| Party | Candidate | Votes | % |
|---|---|---|---|
| Democratic | Shaundelle Brooks | 2,583 | 52.56% |
| Democratic | Tyler Brasher | 2,215 | 45.08% |
| Democratic | John W. Parrish | 116 | 2.36% |
| Total votes | | 4,914 | 100.00% |
General election
| Democratic | Shaundelle Brooks | 16,681 | 53.78% |
| Republican | Chad Bobo | 14,335 | 46.22% |
| Total votes | | 31,016 | 100.00% |
