= Old Hickory, Tennessee =

Neighborhood of metropolitan Nashville, Tennessee

Old Hickory
- Neighborhood
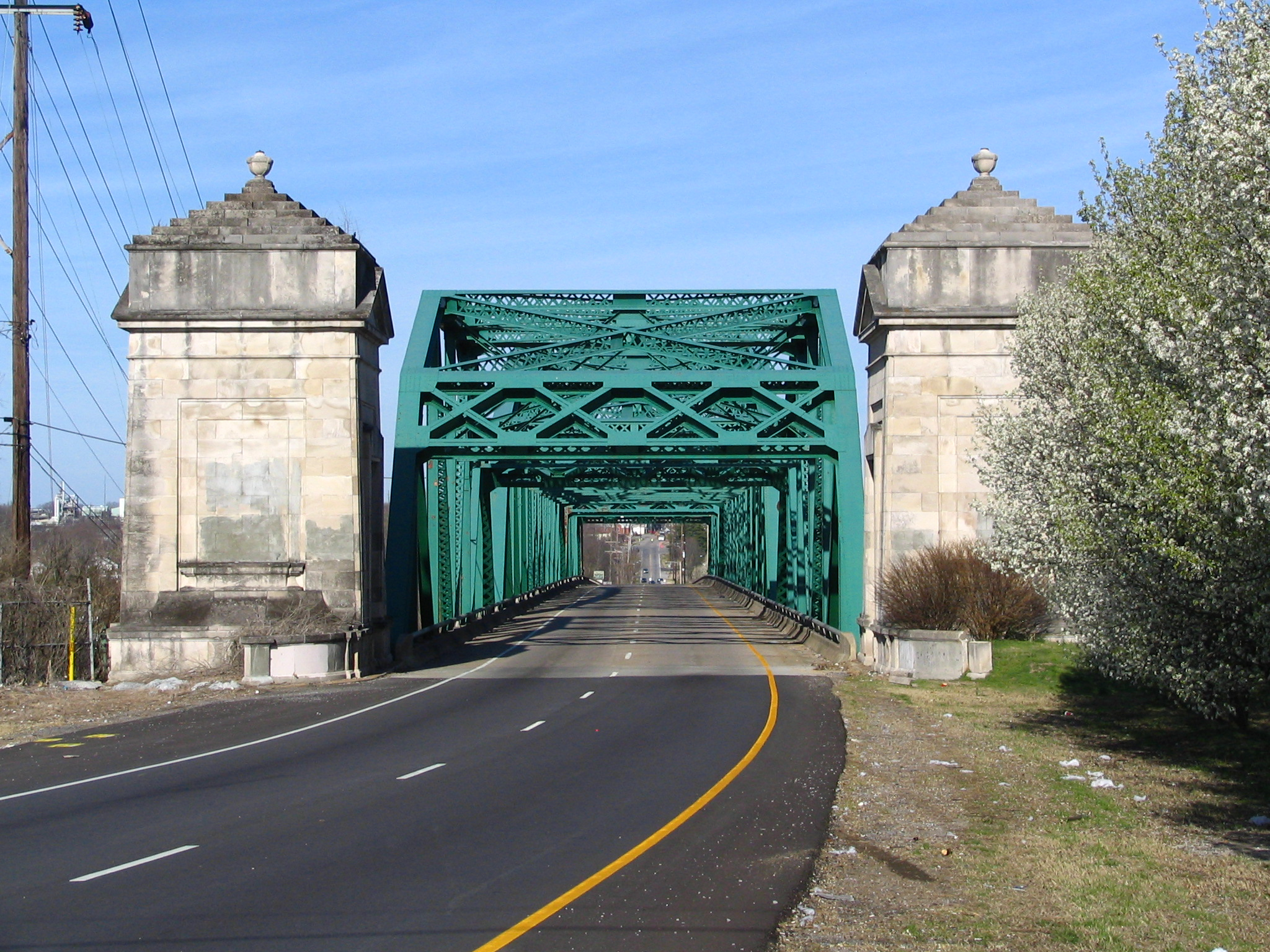
- Old Hickory bridge

- Location within Tennessee Location within the United States
- Coordinates: 36°15′35″N 86°38′52″W
- Country: United States
- State: Tennessee
- County: Davidson
- City: Nashville
- Time zone: UTC-6 (Central (CST))
  - Summer (DST): UTC-5 (CDT)
- Zip code: 37138
- Area code: 615

Old Hickory is a neighborhood of metropolitan Nashville, located in the Hadley Bend section of eastern Davidson County, Tennessee. Old Hickory is governed by the Metropolitan Council of Nashville and Davidson County, because the government of Davidson County is consolidated with that of Nashville.

== History ==
Old Hickory is named in honor of President Andrew Jackson, nicknamed "Old Hickory". Old Hickory started out in 1786 as a 3,000-acre land grant to a man named Sam Jones, and thus the nearby section of the Cumberland River was called Jones' Bend for much of the 19th century. Pioneer John Donelson bought land on Jones' Bend in 1783, and Andrew Jackson bought 330 acres from John Donelson II, his brother-in-law, in February 1792, "the Cumberland River, just across the river from the home of old Mrs. Donelson" on the Gallatin Road at Two Mile Pike. Other early settlers on Jones' Bend were Thomas Overton and Edward Bondurant. Jackson called his farm here either Poplar Grove (1794) or Poplar Flat (1795). A hand-dug well known as "Jackson's Well" was visible in Rayon City into the mid-20th-century although the location has since been lost. Jackson sold the land in 1797 to another brother-in-law, Alexander Donelson. Alexander had no children and left it to a nephew, the son of Severn Donelson, named Alexander Donelson Jr. A. Donelson Jr. sold it in 1837 to the Dismukes family, who held it until it became the "powder plant" property in the 1910s.

Old Hickory is probably best known for being a former company town as the site of a large DuPont plant. Many of the houses were built to house DuPont employees and supervisors in the early days of the factory's existence. Many historic homes are located in the area known as the Village of Old Hickory, containing a number that are listed on the National Register of Historic Places. The smaller bungalow houses were built by DuPont as residences for factory workers, with the larger homes being designated for management. Many of the formerly dilapidated houses are being renovated and gentrified.

== Geography ==
=== Scope ===
It is bordered by the Cumberland River on the north and west, Old Hickory Lake to the east, and the former city of Lakewood to the south. To the north of the area is also the location of Old Hickory Lock and Dam. The main street through the area is Tennessee State Route 45 (Old Hickory Boulevard/Robinson Road). Old Hickory has its own post office, assigned ZIP Code 37138. The postal service area that uses the "Old Hickory" mailing address includes portions of Wilson and Davidson counties.

The Old Hickory Post Office was added to the National Register of Historic Places listings in Davidson County, Tennessee on August 6, 1985.

=== Climate ===
The mean annual temperature at Old Hickory Dam is 58.5 °F (14.7 °C). Monthly averages range from 37.1 °F (2.8 °C) in January to 78.6 °F (25.9 °C) in August, with a diurnal temperature variation of 19.8 to 26.3 °F (11.0 to 14.6 °C). Diurnal temperature variation is highest in April and lowest in January. Old Hickory's climate classifications are Köppen Cfa and Trewartha DOak thanks to its very hot summers (average over 71.6 °F (22.0 °C)), mild winters (average over 32.0 °F (0.0 °C)) and 4-7 month growing seasons (average over 50.0 °F (10.0 °C)). Precipitation is abundant year-round without any major difference, but there is still slight variation. The wet season runs from February through July, reaching its zenith in April with 120 mm of rain. The dry season runs from August through January with an October/November nadir of 85 mm and secondary December peak of 113 mm. Data for record temperatures is spotty before June 2007, but temperatures in Old Hickory have been known to range from −10 °F (−23.3 °C) in January 1966 to 106 °F (41.1 °C) in June and July 2012.

Climate data for Old Hickory Dam, TN (1991–2020 normals, extremes 1965–present)
Month	Jan	Feb	Mar	Apr	May	Jun	Jul	Aug	Sep	Oct	Nov	Dec	Year
Record high °F (°C)	73 (23)	79 (26)	86 (30)	91 (33)	94 (34)	106 (41)	106 (41)	105 (41)	101 (38)	96 (36)	87 (31)	76 (24)	106 (41)
Mean maximum °F (°C)	67 (19)	72 (22)	79 (26)	86 (30)	91 (33)	96 (36)	97 (36)	97 (36)	95 (35)	88 (31)	77 (25)	69 (21)	99 (37)
Mean daily maximum °F (°C)	47.0 (8.3)	51.4 (10.8)	60.5 (15.8)	71.3 (21.8)	78.9 (26.1)	86.1 (30.1)	89.9 (32.2)	90.2 (32.3)	83.4 (28.6)	72.1 (22.3)	60.1 (15.6)	50.2 (10.1)	70.1 (21.2)
Daily mean °F (°C)	37.1 (2.8)	40.7 (4.8)	48.6 (9.2)	58.2 (14.6)	66.9 (19.4)	75.1 (23.9)	78.5 (25.8)	78.6 (25.9)	71.6 (22.0)	59.7 (15.4)	47.9 (8.8)	39.5 (4.2)	58.5 (14.7)
Mean daily minimum °F (°C)	27.2 (−2.7)	30.0 (−1.1)	36.8 (2.7)	45.0 (7.2)	54.9 (12.7)	64.1 (17.8)	67.0 (19.4)	67.0 (19.4)	59.8 (15.4)	47.2 (8.4)	35.7 (2.1)	28.8 (−1.8)	47.0 (8.3)
Mean minimum °F (°C)	10 (−12)	13 (−11)	21 (−6)	31 (−1)	40 (4)	54 (12)	59 (15)	58 (14)	48 (9)	33 (1)	22 (−6)	17 (−8)	9 (−13)
Record low °F (°C)	−10 (−23)	0 (−18)	8 (−13)	21 (−6)	34 (1)	47 (8)	52 (11)	54 (12)	36 (2)	26 (−3)	14 (−10)	6 (−14)	−10 (−23)
Average precipitation inches (mm)	3.73 (95)	4.26 (108)	4.64 (118)	4.74 (120)	4.55 (116)	3.76 (96)	4.05 (103)	3.38 (86)	3.70 (94)	3.33 (85)	3.35 (85)	4.44 (113)	47.93 (1,217)
Average snowfall inches (cm)	0.6 (1.5)	0.3 (0.76)	0.2 (0.51)	0 (0)	0 (0)	0 (0)	0 (0)	0 (0)	0 (0)	0 (0)	0 (0)	0.1 (0.25)	1.2 (3.0)
Source: https://www.weather.gov/wrh/climate?wfo=ohx

== Economy ==
Old Hickory is the site of a country club, large golf course, city park, a Chamber of Commerce, and the DuPont plant, which has been mostly shut down but continues to employ a few hundred workers. The Nashville National Weather Service Forecast Office is located just to the southeast in nearby Wilson County.

== Notable people ==
- Nate Bargatze (1979–), stand-up comedian and actor
- Cathy Gordon Brown (1965–), independent candidate for President of the United States in the 2000 presidential election
- Danika & the Jeb, musical duo
- Darren Jernigan (1969–), Tennessee Democratic politician
- Jack Kershaw (1913–2010), attorney and sculptor who represented James Earl Ray
- William F. Lyell (1921–1951), corporal in the United States Army during the Korean War; posthumously received the Medal of Honor
- Kathleen Madigan, Stand-up comedian
- Ken Shipp (1929–2012), American college and professional football coach
- Mike Turner (1955–), Tennessee Democratic politician
- Edgar S. Woolard, Jr. (1934–2023), former chairman and chief executive officer of DuPont

== See also ==
- List of memorials to Andrew Jackson
