= Demonbreun's Cave =

Historic cave in Nashville, Tennessee

- U.S. National Register of Historic Places
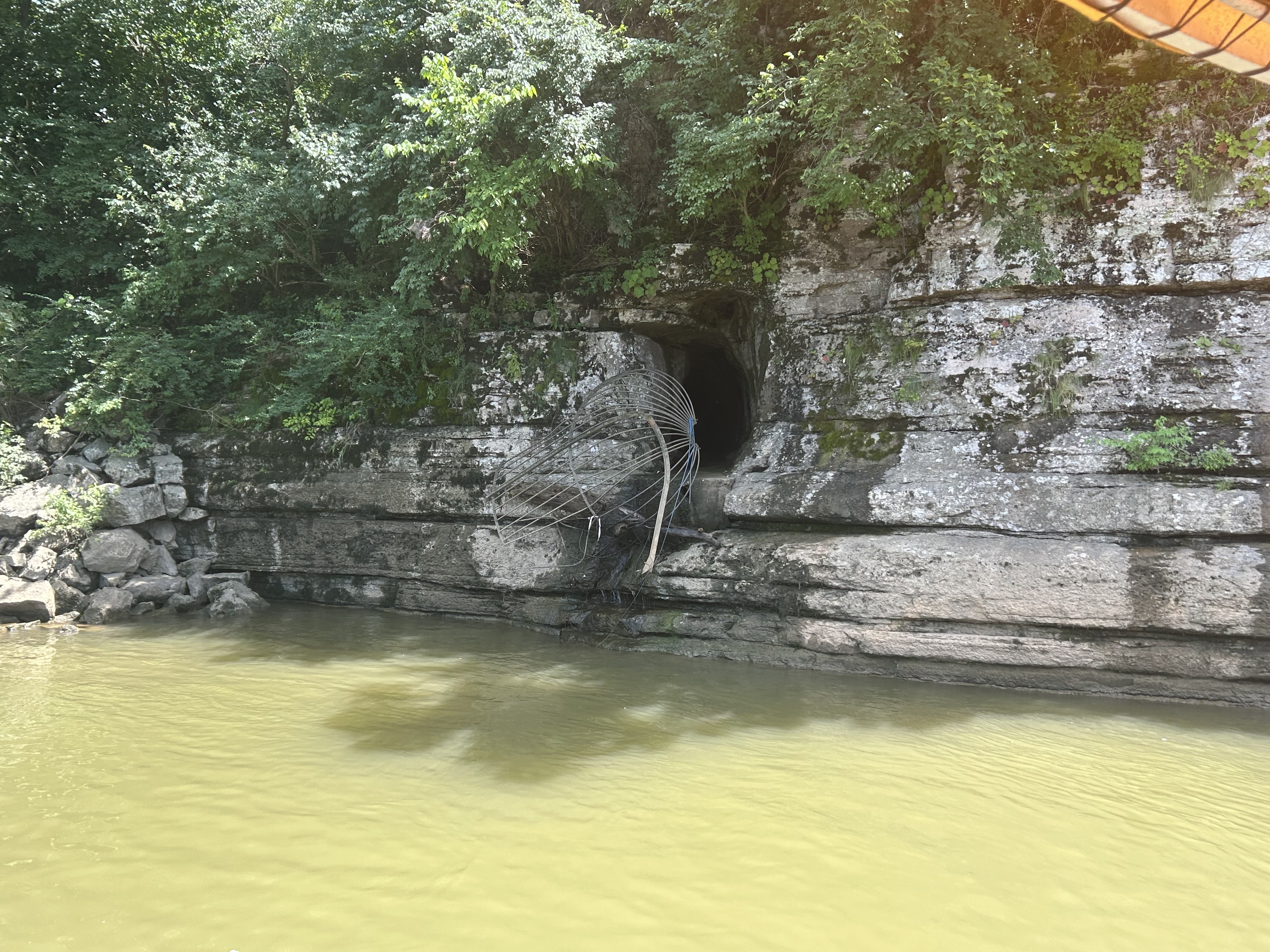
- Demonbreun's Cave

- Location within Tennessee Location within the United States
- Location: 1700 Omohumdro Dr. Nashville
- Coordinates: 36.165278°N 86.716389°W
- NRHP reference No.: 80003789
- Added to NRHP: July 1979

Demonbreun's Cave is a cave in Nashville which is listed on the National Register of Historic Places listings in Davidson County, Tennessee (NRHP) in 1979. The cave was named after a fur trapper named Timothy Demonbreun.

== History ==
There is a large crack in the facade along the Cumberland River which is named for fur trapper Timothy Demonbreun. The cave was originally a home for Demonbreun in an area of Tennessee which was home to the indigenous Chickasaw tribe. He used the cave for a short time because it was near a plethora of Game animals. The cave appears to be a crack in the rocks along the Cumberland River. It is approximately one mile upriver from Nashville on the right river bank.

The cave was listed on the National Register of Historic Places listings in Davidson County, Tennessee in July 1979. It was first explored between 1750 and 1799.
