= Olivia Hill =

American politician and engineer

President pro tempore of the Metropolitan Council of Nashville and Davidson County
- Incumbent
- Assumed office September 2026

Personal details
- Children: 2

Military service
- Allegiance: United States
- Branch/service: United States Navy
- Years of service: 1986–1995
- Battles/wars: Gulf War

Olivia Hill (born 1965/1966) is an American politician and engineer serving as a president pro tempore of the Metropolitan Council of Nashville and Davidson County since 2026. She is the highest ranking transgender government official in the history of the state of Tennessee. Hill worked at Vanderbilt University for over 25 years including as the acting manager of its self-contained power plant. From 1986 to 1995, she served in the United States Navy during which time, she saw combat in the Gulf War.

== Early life ==
Hill was born in 1965 or 1966. She is from Nashville, Tennessee. She is the great-granddaughter of Horace Greely Hill, founder of H.G. Hills Food Stores. Hill graduated from Hillwood High School in 1983.

== Career ==
Hill was an engineer in the United States Navy from 1986 to 1995. She saw combat in the Gulf War.

Hill worked at the Vanderbilt University power plant for over 25 years in a number of positions including plumber, pipe-fitter, welder, high voltage electrician, diesel mechanic, jet-engine mechanic, and boiler specialist. She eventually served as a senior supervisor and acting manager of the self-contained power plant. She transitioned in 2019. In December 2019, she filed a complaint with the university's equal employment opportunity office and was then on administrative leave. Hill was represented by civil rights lawyer Abby Rubenfeld. On September 29, 2021, she filed a lawsuit against the university alleging workplace discrimination. Hill retired on December 27, 2021, the same day her case was closed. The lawsuit was settled for an undisclosed sum in 2022.

Hill is an LGBTQ rights advocate and served on the board of directors of the Tennessee Pride Chamber. She entered politics after being encouraged by Danica Roem at a Washington D.C. gala. In June 2023, Hill and Eric L. Cox, a health and wellness coach, served as the grand marshals of the Nashville Pride. On September 14, 2023, Hill won 12.9 percent of the vote in an election for a nonpartisan member-at-large seat of the Metropolitan Council of Nashville and Davidson County. She is the first transgender lawmaker elected in Tennessee.

On September 1, 2026, Hill was elected president pro tempore of the Metropolitan Council, making her the highest ranking transgender government official in the history of the state.

== Personal life ==
Hill married her high school sweetheart and had two children. They are divorced.

== See also ==
- List of transgender political office-holders
- List of transgender public officeholders in the United States
