= Music Industry Coalition =

Music industry partnership in Nashville, Tennessee

- Abbreviation: MIC
- Formation: 2014, United States
- Type: Non-profit organization
- Purpose: Preserving and nurturing the musical culture, heritage and community of the Nashville region.
- Headquarters: Nashville, Tennessee, U.S.
- Members: Ben Folds; Mike Curb; Aubrey Preston; Chuck Elcan; Karl Dean
- Chairman: Mike Kopp
- Affiliations: National Trust for Historic Preservation
- Website: Official Website

The Music Industry Coalition is a localized volunteer grassroots partnership of music industry professionals, artists, fans, and preservationists primarily based in Nashville, Tennessee. The coalition is dedicated to the preservation, nurturing, and enhancement of Nashville's musical heritage, culture, and community.

The group is actively pursuing the preservation of historical music buildings and areas primarily located in Music Row or the surrounding region in partnership with the National Trust for Historic Preservation. Among the many supporters, rock star Ben Folds and Curb Records founder Mike Curb are included within the group.

== Origins ==
Music Industry Coalition was formed in the wake of the 2014 RCA Studio A developer controversy and its successful preservation thereafter. One of the coalitions pivotal members, Mike Curb, had previously, before the group's founding, been instrumental in preserving the existence of both historic RCA Studio B as well as Bradley Studios. He later relinquished Studio B to the Country Music Hall of Fame.
