= Adam Dread =

American politician (born 1963)

Member of the Nashville Metro Council from the at-large district
- In office 2002–2007

Personal details
- Born: Adam Dread; February 1, 1963 (age 63) Pittsburgh, Pennsylvania, U.S.
- Education: Vanderbilt University (BA); Nashville School of Law (JD)

Adam Dread (born February 1, 1963, in Pittsburgh, Pennsylvania) is an American politician. He served as a city council member-at-large for the Metropolitan Council of Nashville and Davidson County until September 2007. As of 2007, he was a practicing attorney and businessman in Nashville.

== Biography ==
Dread graduated from Palm Beach Academy and Vanderbilt University with a Bachelor of Arts degree. He obtained his J.D. when he graduated from Nashville School of Law in 2004.

Dread was elected to the Metro Council of Nashville and Davidson County in December 2002. Since then, he set a Metro record for winning the most county wide races in the shortest period of time (he won four races in one year, including run-offs.) He was endorsed by every major newspaper, union, and trade organization in the area. Prior to that, he had run for a Metro Council at-large seat in 1999. He chaired the Public Safety - Beer and Regulated Beverages Committee and also served as a member of the Public Works Committee and the Traffic and Parking Committee. He was at one point Chair of the Convention and Tourism Committee. He is also known for building the live music stage at the airport, in conjunction with the Convention Tourism Bureau, to welcome visitors and locals to Music City with live music. Popular with the public, in 2008 he was voted "The Best Metro Councilman Out the Door", as he was term limited, and could not run again.

=== Gun laws ===
In the summer of 2009 Dread became very involved in the controversial new gun laws enacted in Tennessee. When the Legislature passed a law allowing people with carry permits to take their handguns into bars, Dread, and a team of lawyers, sued the State of Tennessee. They alleged that the law was passed due to fraudulent facts provided by lobbyists. In addition to the public safety and economic arguments, the team argued that the law was unconstitutional on its face, and created an unsafe work environment, thus violating OSHA standards. Dread debated this issue multiple times on Fox & Friends. The case is still pending in Chancery Court. In September 2009, Dread joined Brady Campaign President, Paul Helmke, in a debate with National Rifle Association (NRA) lobbyists at the University of Tennessee at Martin campus.
