= Timothy Demonbreun =

French-Canadian fur trader (1731-1826)

- Born: 23 March 1731; Boucherville, New France
- Died: October 1826 (aged 95); Nashville, Tennessee
- Other name: Jacque Timothe Boucher Demontbrun
- Occupations: Fur trader and merchant
- Known for: "First citizen of Nashville"

Jacques-Timothée Boucher, Sieur de Montbrun (/dəˈmʌmbriən/; 23 March 1731 – October 1826), anglicized as Timothy Demonbreun, was a French-Canadian fur trader, a Lieutenant in the American Revolution, and Lieutenant-Governor of the Illinois Territory. He is known as the "first citizen" of Nashville, Tennessee.

== Hunter and entrepreneur ==
Demonbreun's great-grandfather, Pierre Boucher, was the first Canadian to be raised to the rank of nobility. His father, Etienne, served in the French army in Canada during the French and Indian War, the North American front of the Seven Years' War.

After his country, France, was beaten in the Battle of the Plains of Abraham in Canada in 1759, Jacques-Timothee Boucher at the age of 28 migrated south to the British colonies, what became the United States, and got into the fur trade. Preferring the simple life of a trapper and hunter, he dropped the noble title, adapting it in an anglicization as his new surname, Demonbreun. He had begun traveling to the Middle Tennessee area in the 1760s while in his 30s.

In 1766, while hunting near the muddy water at the mouth of a small creek entering the Cumberland River in the region called French Lick, Demonbreun noticed a large number of buffalo and deer using a salt lick. The spring is a natural source of sulfurated water, and eventually became known as Sulphur Dell. He lived in a cave there for several months until he could build a cabin near the river to use as his home base for fur trapping. Demonbreun made frequent trips to the early Nashville settlement to engage in fur trading with local Native Americans. When James Robertson and the Watauga settlers established Fort Nashborough in 1778, they were surprised and relieved to find that Demonbreun, a white man, was thriving there.

The cave that he lived in is now listed on the National Register of Historic Places listings in Davidson County, Tennessee in July 1979. It was first explored between 1750 and 1799. The cave has been named after him: "Demonbreun's Cave"

== Military service ==
Demonbreun joined the George Rogers Clark expedition and received an appointment as lieutenant governor in command of the Northwest Territory. He settled at Fort Kaskaskia in the Illinois Country, where he served as lieutenant governor from 1783 to 1786. In 1786 he resigned from military service and soon thereafter moved permanently to Nashville.

== Family ==
Demonbreun traveled extensively, and managed two careers and two families. He fulfilled his duties as lieutenant governor of the Illinois Territory and maintained a family in Kaskaskia. Demonbreun had five children by his wife, Therese Archange Gibault, in Illinois.

During his time in Nashville, he took a common-law wife named Elizabeth Bennett and had three children by her: Polly (Cagle); William; and John Baptiste Demonbreun, who was born in a cave on the banks of the Cumberland River. Known as the “cave baby”, John Baptiste is known to be the first White (i.e. Euro-American) child born in what is now Nashville. .

In his will, he mentions three of his legal children by name: Agnes Doza, Julia Johnson, and Timothy DeMonbreun. He specifically lists children William, John, and Polly as illegitimate (or natural). He does not mention the mother of either family of children, nor his son Felix, though Felix Demonbreun is well documented through census and other records. According to Felix's grandson, Samuel, Felix was removed from Timothy's will because he elected to become a Baptist minister against the wishes of his father who was French Catholic.

== Later life ==
Eventually, Demonbreun developed a thriving mercantile and fur trading business in the Nashville area with seventeen employees. By 1800 his mercantile business on Nashville's Public Square advertised such items as window glass, paper, cured deer hides, and buffalo tongues. An 1809 newspaper advertisement announced that he was opening a tavern, also on the Public Square.

The Revolutionary French hero, Marquis de Lafayette, visited Nashville on May 4, 1825, during his farewell tour of the United States. Andrew Jackson presided over a banquet in his honor at the Nashville Inn. Jacques-Timothée, or Timothy Demonbreun, by then very elderly, conversed with the Marquis in their native French. When he died in 1826, Demonbreun divided his substantial fortune among his children.

== Historical records and memorials ==
No record of the burial site of Nashville's "First Citizen" survived. He was most likely buried at Nashville City Cemetery but early records no longer exist. A historical marker at the northwest corner of Third Avenue North and Broadway, in the city, marks the site of his home.

In 1996 a monument sculpted by Alan LeQuire to honor Demonbreun was erected near Fort Nashborough, overlooking the Cumberland River in downtown Nashville. Demonbreun Street, named for him, crosses Interstate 40 in downtown Nashville.

A monument has been erected in honor of Timothy Demonbreun at Carney Cemetery in Ashland City, Tennessee, but historians do not believe he was buried there. At the time of his death, this was the farm of his past mistress Elizabeth Bennett, and her husband Joseph DuRard. Elizabeth Bennett DuRard's grave is beside the monument.

== Name ==
Because French orthography was so fluid at the time, and because of widespread variations in English orthography, the spelling and version of Demonbreun's name is of some debate. The preferred use today is Timothy Demonbreun, though the first name is sometimes rendered in the French as Timothé, Timothée or Timothe. As for the last name, it derives from the French words, de (of) mont (mount) bruen (brown) for of mount brown, and is also rendered variously as Demontbrun, de Montbrun, Demontbreun, de Montbreun, De Mont-Breun, De Monbrun, de Mon Breun, and others. Descendants of Demonbreun (it is a very common surname in Middle Tennessee) spell the name with and without the middle "T," as one word or two, with a "U" in place of the "O," with and without the "E," and with an "N" or an "M" at the end. In addition, other variations such as Demumbrine and "Demombrum" also exist. Demonbreun Street in Nashville shows the preferred spelling. A popular local pronunciation is /dəˈmʌmbriən/, and rhymes with "Northumbrian."
