= Jim Shulman =

Vice Mayor of Nashville
- In office September 17, 2018 – September 1, 2023
- Preceded by: David Briley
- Succeeded by: Angie Henderson

Personal details
- Political party: Democratic

Jim Shulman was the vice mayor of Nashville, Tennessee and President of the Metropolitan Council of Nashville and Davidson County. He was sworn in on September 17, 2018. He is also the CEO of Safe Haven Family Shelter, a Nashville-based organization that helps individuals and families experiencing homelessness.

Previously, Shulman served as a council member representing the 25th district from 1999 to 2007 and then as an at-large council member from 2015 until he was sworn in as vice mayor. As an at-large council member, Shulman was one of three no votes on a $14 million incentive package for the Opryland water park.

On August 3, 2023, Shulman was defeated for re-election by Metro councilmember Angie Henderson

== Vice Mayor ==
=== Election ===
Shulman was elected in the 2018 special election. After finishing second in the general special election, Shulman won the runoff, defeating Sheri Weiner. Weiner had been the acting Vice Mayer since then-Vice Mayor David Briley assumed the Mayor's office following Megan Barry's resignation.

Shulman was elected to a full four-year term in August 2019.

=== Fair Board Appointees ===
After Nashville Mayor John Cooper missed deadlines on more than a dozen appointments, including appointments for two positions on the Board of Fair Commissioners, the responsibility to make these appointments fell to Shulman. The vice mayor twice nominated a black woman for the position despite calls for increased representation from the Hispanic community. Shulman later nominated and the council approved the appointment of Mario Avila, a Latino man, and Jasper Hendricks, a black man.

== Homelessness ==
During his time as at-large council member, Shulman was critical of the city's response to homelessness, specifically its cold weather plan. He spoke at December 2016 memorial service in memory of the 87 homeless people who died on the streets of Nashville in 2016. In January 2017, he held an emergency meeting to allow one cold weather shelter to go over capacity.

On April 14, 2021, Shulman was named CEO of Safe Haven Family Shelter effective July 14.

As vice mayor, Shulman held a series of meetings in November and December 2021 to gather ideas and solutions to outdoor homelessness in Nashville. One change that was discussed at these meetings was raising the opening temperature for Metro Nashville's Overflow Shelter to 32 degrees from its previous temperature of 28 degrees. The city's shelter committee voted to change that temperature threshold in early December.

Some stakeholders have noted the mayor's absence from this series of meetings as a sign that the mayor is not interested in listening to other community members.
