= Rip Ryman =

American politician (1934–2020)

Irvin Carney "Rip" Ryman (January 9, 1934 – September 21, 2020) was an American politician who was a member of the Metropolitan Council of Nashville and Davidson County, representing the 10th district.

== Life and career ==
Rip Ryman was born in Nashville, Tennessee on January 9, 1934. He served in the U.S. military during the Korean War, from 1952 to 1954. He graduated from East High School in 1952, attended Belmont College from 1954 to 1955, and went to the University of Tennessee at Nashville from 1959 to 1962.

In October 2006, Vice Mayor Howard Gentry picked Rip Ryman to be Chair of the Budget and Finance Committee. He serves on both the Parks, Library, Recreation, and Public Entertainment Facility Committee and the Public Safety - Beer and Regulated Beverages Committee.

Ryman died in Goodlettsville, Tennessee on September 21, 2020, at the age of 86.

== Political views ==
=== Proposals ===
Ryman proposed raising the mayor's salary from $136,500 to $160,000, an increase of 17%, after the Metro Civil Service Commission recommendation based on the salaries of mayors in 13 other comparable cities. Ryman also suggested amending the resolution to bring down the pay raise to only 9%, because Metro employees had their salaries raised by only 4% in the four previous years. Upset by a $10 parking ticket he got outside Metro City Hall, and difficulty finding parking spaces outside the building, he proposed restricting the on-street parking open to the public to Metro city council members during the afternoons.

=== Votes ===
Ryman voted against Sylvan Park historic zoning, for Lower Broadway historic zoning, and against a Westin Hotel on Lower Broadway. On the third reading, he voted in favor of the proposal for a new ballpark for the Nashville Sounds, which included provisions for hotels, condos, shops and other businesses on the land adjacent to the stadium.

== Controversies ==
The faith-based drug/alcohol rehab program Teen Challenge accused Rip Ryman of using his political influence to block their attempts to get land use permits for a rehabilitation facility. After the Metro government granted the permits anyway, Ryman suggested a zoning change for the property that would have effectively blocked their plans. Teen Challenge sued the Metro government for $500,000 in damages as an institution and $50,000 for each of the three plaintiffs that would have been residents of the facility. The city of Nashville eventually settled the lawsuit in 2008. 1 male student and 2 female students received monetary damages.
