= Hillwood High School =

Public school in Tennessee, U.S.

Lawson High School

Location
- 400 Davidson Road; Nashville, Tennessee; United States
- Coordinates: 36.1185°N 86.87347°W

Information
- Type: Public
- Motto: "We are Lawson!"
- Established: 2023
- School district: Metropolitan Nashville Public Schools
- Principal: William B. Wright
- Grades: 9–12
- Gender: Coed
- Enrollment: 1,399
- Colors: Baby blue and Yellow
- Athletics conference: TSSAA Class 5A, Region 6
- Team name: Lightning
- Website: schools.mnps.org/hillwood-high-school

James Lawson High School is a public high school located in Nashville, Tennessee, and is part of the Metropolitan Nashville Public Schools (MNPS). Athletic teams are known as the Lightning and the school colors are baby blue and yellow. James Lawson opened in 2023.

== Academics ==
Hillwood offers all levels of academics. Standard and honors level courses are available along with Advanced Placement and International Baccalaureate courses. Hillwood became one of the first IB World Schools in Tennessee in February 2004. It offers the Diploma Programme. Additionally, the Advancement Via Individual Determination (AVID) program is available. Hillwood is a Technology Site Demonstration school.

== Athletics ==
There are many sports available for students to participate in. The Topper Athletic Club is a parent/faculty organization that helps support all sports teams. They generally meet once a month. All sporting events are overseen by the Tennessee Secondary School Athletic Association (TSSAA).

Sports at Hillwood High School include:

- Baseball
- Basketball (boys & girls)
- Bowling (boys & girls)
- Cheerleading
- Cross Country (boys & girls)
- Football
- Golf (boys & girls)
- Soccer (boys & girls)
- Softball
- Tennis (boys & girls)
- Track (boys & girls)
- Volleyball
- Wrestling
- Dance Team

=== Team accomplishments ===
The football team was state championship contender in the 1990s and early 2000s before their move from AAAA (4A) to AAAAA (5A), which was Tennessee's highest class. Now there are six classes and Hillwood is in 5A.

The baseball team won Hillwood's first state championship in any sport when they won the TSSAA AAA state championship over Maryville High School in 1977. William Brennan, who would later be a Major League pitcher for the Los Angeles Dodgers and Chicago Cubs, played for Hillwood in 1981.

The basketball team was coached by Ricardo Patton in 1986–87. He later went on to coach college basketball at the NCAA Division I level for Colorado and later for Northern Illinois.

=== Rivals ===
Hillwood has a few sports rivals. Their main rivalry is with Hillsboro High School in the annual "Battle of the Hills". Other rivals include John Overton High School, Glencliff High School, McGavock High School, and Father Ryan High School. Montgomery Bell Academy was previously a major rival as the schools are only two miles apart, but Hillwood has not been very competitive with that school since the public/private split.

== Extracurricular activities and clubs ==
- Marching Band
- Concert Band
- Piano
- Chamber Choir
- Dance
- Music Understanding
- Orchestra
- Theater
- Model United Nations
- Youth in Government
- HOSA
- DECA
- Debate
- Mock Trials
- National Honor Society
- International Thespian Society
- Student Council
- Student Government Association
- Student Ambassadors
- International Day
- Latino Achievers
- Gender and Sexuality Alliance
- School newspaper, "The Topper Times"

== Notable alumni ==
- Olivia Hill, politician and engineer
