= United States Post Office at Old Hickory =

Historic post office in Nashville, Tennessee

- US Post Office-Old Hickory
- U.S. National Register of Historic Places
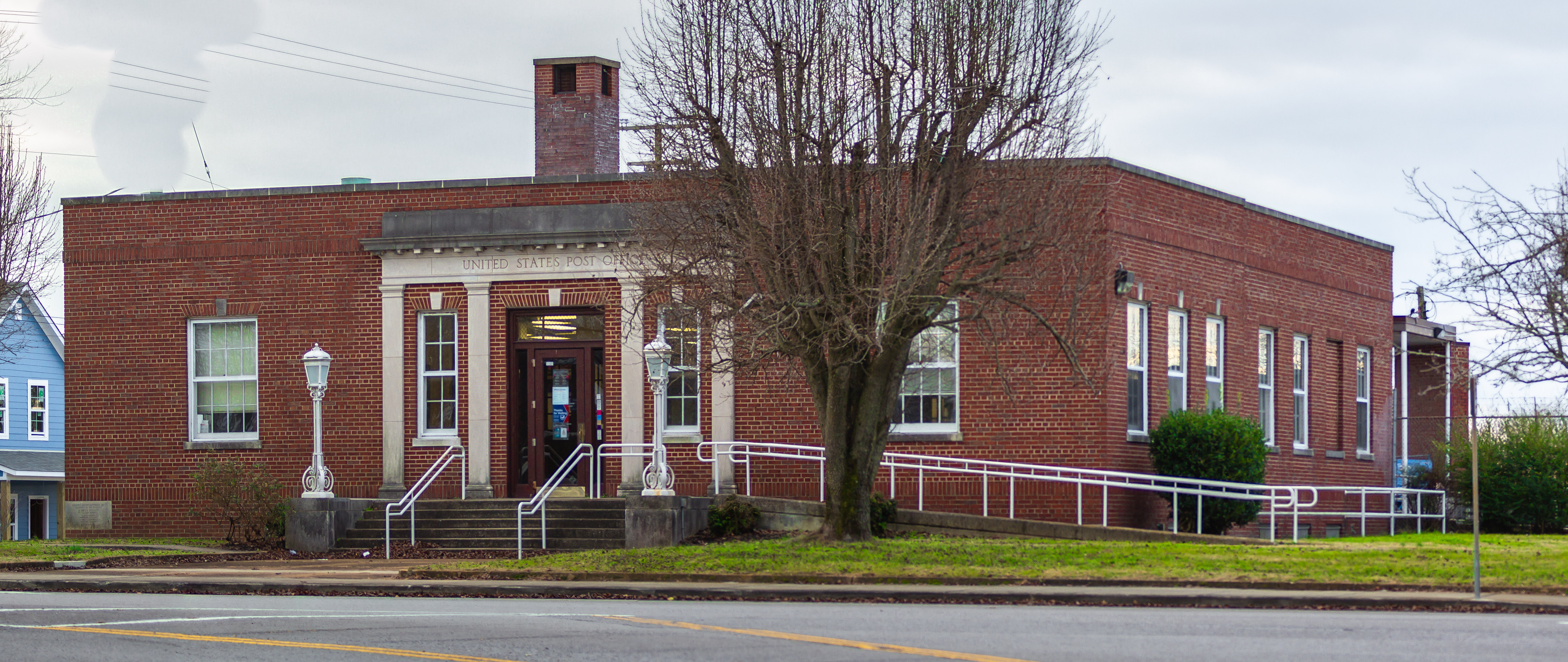
- US Post Office-Old Hickory

- Location within Tennessee Location within the United States
- Location: 1010 Donelson Ave Nashville, Tennessee
- Coordinates: 36.263889°N 86.649722°W
- Built: 1934
- Architect: Simon, Louis; Public Works Administration
- Architectural style: Colonial Revival architecture
- NRHP reference No.: 85002401
- Added to NRHP: August 6, 1985

The Old Hickory Post Office is a historic neighborhood post office in the Old Hickory neighborhood of Nashville, Tennessee. It was listed on the National Register of Historic Places listings in Davidson County, Tennessee (NRHP) in 1985.

== History ==
The original Old Hickory Post Office was built in 1918 and was of frame construction. It was located across from the historic Post Office which stands today. As the amount of mail grew, the residents determined that a new post office was needed. The Post Office that stands today was built as part of the New Deal in 1934 by the Public Works Administration. The building now sits on 5 acres (2.0 ha).

The 1934 structure was designed by Louis A. Simon architects in the style of Colonial Revival architecture. It is located at 1010 Donelson Ave in Nashville, Tennessee. The building was added to the National Register of Historic Places listings in Davidson County, Tennessee on August 6, 1985.

The post office continues to operate, serving 22,191 Old Hickory residents. The location deals with approximately 35,419 packages each year.

== Description ==
It is a brick building, one story tall with a flat roof. The main entrance to the building has four Doric Pilasters made of concrete. The pilasters support a cornice which features the words: "United States Post Office".
