= RCA Studio A =

Music recording studio in Nashville, Tennessee, US

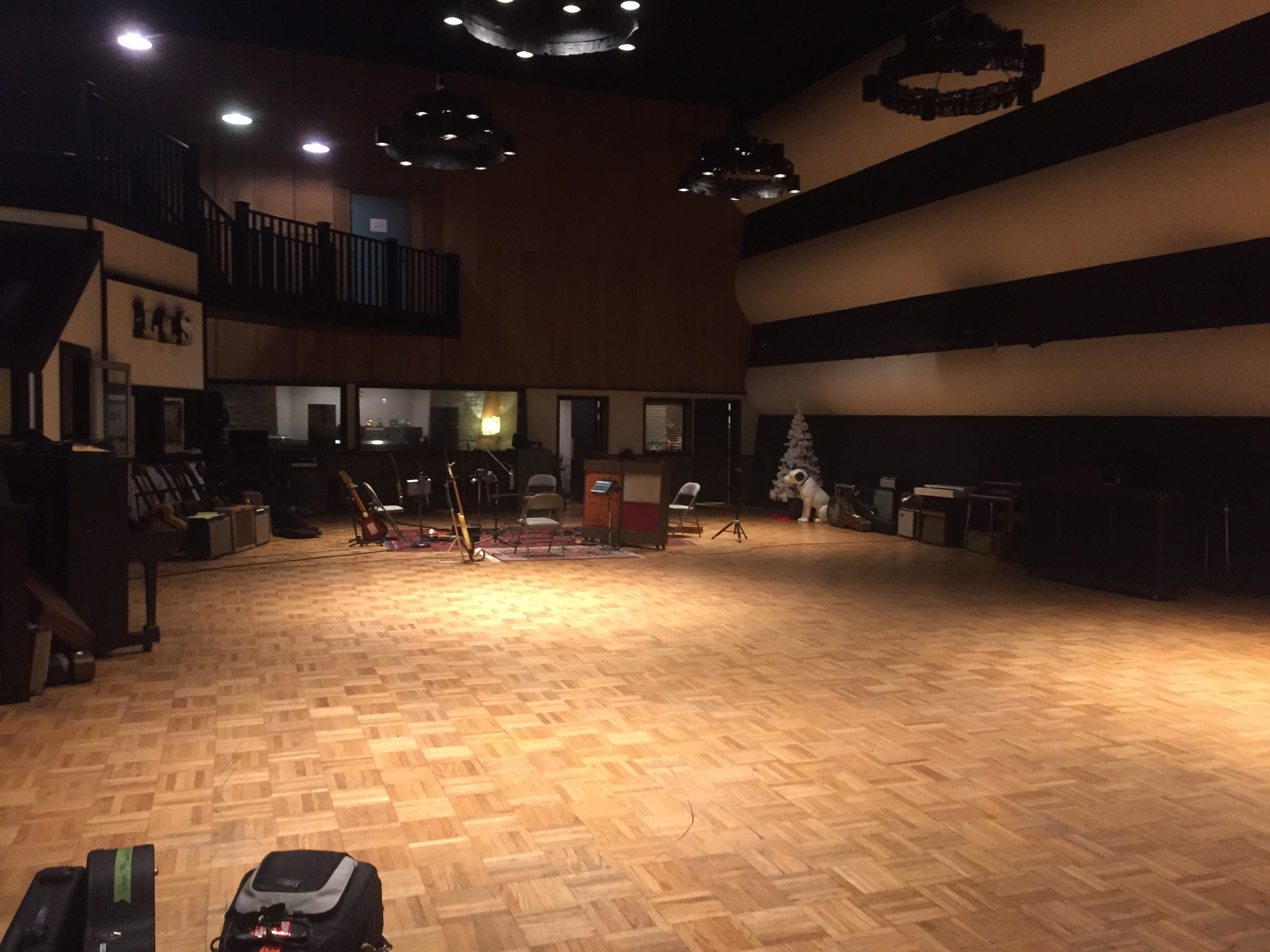
- Interactive map of the RCA Studio A area
- Alternative names: Grand Victor Sound; Javelina Studios; Ben's Place

General information
- Location: 30 Music Square W # 100, Nashville, Tennessee
- Coordinates: 36.1496°N 86.7930°W

RCA Studio A is a music recording studio in Nashville, Tennessee, built and founded in 1965 by Chet Atkins, Owen Bradley and Harold Bradley as an addition to the RCA Victor Studio the company established seven years prior. Together these two studios were known simply by the name "RCA Victor Nashville Sound Studios" (or "RCA Studios" for short) and became known in the 1960s for becoming an essential factor and location to the development of the musical production style and sound engineering technique known as the Nashville Sound.

RCA utilized the studio until January 1977, after which it was sold to Owen Bradley, who remodeled it and operated the studio as Music City Music Hall until the late 1980s. It was later operated as Javelina Recording Studios. Beginning in 2002, Ben Folds leased the building and operated it as Ben's Place and later Grand Victor Sound.

In 2014, when a local developer planned to demolish the building in order to build condominiums, Folds gathered support to preserve the building, and Mike Curb and local philanthropists collectively purchased the building. The following year, RCA Studio A was added to the National Register of Historic Places. Since 2016, Dave Cobb has leased the studio and used it to operate his Low Country Sound record label imprint.

== History ==
=== RCA Studio A (1965-1977) ===
Chet Atkins and Owen Bradley constructed a new 3-story building at the original address of 806 17th Avenue South (the street would be renamed Music Square West in 1975) to be leased by RCA Victor. Half of the building was built as office space for the label's Nashville division, and the other half was a new recording studio. Officially opening on March 29, 1965, the new addition to RCA Victor's Nashville Sound Studios, which was newer and larger than RCA's adjacent studio built 9 years prior, was appropriately designated as Studio A, while the original studio became Studio B. Studio A was one of three similarly-designed large studios built by RCA in New York, Los Angeles, and Nashville specifically for recording large groups of musicians, such as choirs, string sections, or orchestras, playing together live, which was essential to the Nashville sound production style. With its live room measuring 75 x 45 feet with 25 foot high ceiling, it was the largest studio room in Nashville when it opened. The studio was based on the ideas of Chet Atkins, Owen Bradley and Harold Bradley. Studios A and B were collectively referred to as the RCA Victor Nashville Sound Studios.

Between 1965 and 1977 the studio hosted artists including Perry Como, the Blackwood Brothers, Connie Smith, Charley Pride, Lynn Anderson, Dolly Parton, the Beach Boys, the Blackwood Brothers, George Beverly Shea, Nancy Sinatra, Eddy Arnold, Merle Haggard, Lee Hazlewood and Ann-Margret, and Dottie West. Waylon Jennings, who had recorded nearly all of his albums at Atkins' studio, recorded Honky Tonk Heroes there in 1973, with the album becoming important to the development of the outlaw country subgenre.

In 1977 as the result of an unresolved union dispute, RCA closed their Nashville studios. The label's management continued to occupy offices within the other half of the building until 1990. RCA Studio B was made available to the Country Music Hall of Fame for tours.

=== Music City Music Hall (1977-1988) ===
Three months after its closure, Owen Bradley bought Studio A, re-opening it as Music City Music Hall and operating it as a subsidiary to his Bradley's Barn recording studio in nearby Mount Juliet.

Artists recording at the studio in the Music City Music Hall era included Loretta Lynn, Gary Stewart, Sylvia, the Family Brown, and Earl Klugh. In 1981, George Strait recorded six of the ten songs on his debut studio album at the studio, and returned to the studio to record the followup album, which included his first two number one singles.

=== Javelina Recording Studios (1989-2002) ===
By 1992 the studio was run by producer Warren Peterson under the name Javelina Sound Studios. Artists recording at the studio in the Javelina era included Amy Grant, Glen Campbell, DC Talk, Jimmy Buffett, Tim McGraw, Beth Nielsen Chapman, Reba McEntire, Little Texas, Point of Grace, Martina McBride, Wynonna Judd, Mark Chesnutt, Sawyer Brown, Rebecca Lynn Howard, Steve Wariner, Alabama, Vince Gill, BeBe & CeCe Winans, Dan Seals. In 1997 Lee Ann Womack recorded her self-titled debut album at the studio, and returned to the studio for the recording of her next two studio albums.

Ben Folds, a session drummer at the time, used the studio at night to work on his own original material that would become Ben Folds Five.

=== Ben's Place & Grand Victor Sound (2002-2014) ===
Folds moved away and returned to Nashville in 2002, and leased the building for the next 12 years, initially for his own use. He also rented out parts of the building to other artists, such as Jamey Johnson. In 2009 Folds enlisted the help of Sharon Corbitt-House to re-open it to outside clients as a commercial studio under the name of Ben's Place and later Grand Victor Sound. Artists recording at the studio during this timeframe included Kacey Musgraves, Joe Bonamassa, John Hiatt, and Jewel. Folds himself recorded So There at the studio with the yMusic Ensemble, which included a piano concerto performed with the 83-piece Nashville Symphony and producer Elliot Scheiner.

=== Demolition controversy ===
In 2014 the building’s existence was threatened with demolition by a local developer to make way for condominiums, and Ben Folds gathered regional and professional support in an effort to save the building. In late 2014, just prior to the building's demolition, Curb Records founder, Mike Curb, and local philanthropists Chuck Elcan and Aubrey Preston partnered to collectively purchase the building for $5.6 million in order to preserve its historic significance.

The efforts to save RCA Studio A led to a more consolidated, dedicated and collaborative effort to preserve the musical history and promote creativity within Music Row and the Nashville area. It also led to the establishment of grassroots preservationist organizations such as the Music Industry Coalition.

Producer Dave Cobb, who was slated to record an album with Chris Stapleton, originally intended to record the album at Sound Emporium Studios, but it was already booked. Having read reports of the impending demolition of the historic RCA Studio A building and its Grand Victor Sound studios, he decided to record Stapleton's debut studio album there, before the building and its recording studios were gone forever.

=== Historic landmark & Restoration ===
In 2015, Studio A joined Studio B in the National Register of Historic Places. The same year, Kacey Musgraves recorded her 2015 Grammy-nominated album Pageant Material at the studio.

In early 2016, country music record producer Dave Cobb leased the building, which he uses for his Low Country Sound record label imprint.

In October 2017, the completion of a $500,000 restoration of the studios was marked by the mounting of replicas of RCA Victor Recording Studios signage used for the first four years of the studio's operation on the building's exterior.

== Production style ==
Bradley Studios, RCA Studio B, and RCA Studio A were essential locations to the development of the "Nashville Sound", a style characterized by background vocals and strings. The Nashville Sound both revived the popularity of country music and helped establish Nashville's reputation as an international recording center, with these three studios at the center of what would become known as Music Row.

Designed and built later than the Bradley Studios' Quonset Hut and RCA Studio B, Studio A's gym-sized room, large enough to house choirs, orchestras, string sections and a live band, was specifically designed by John E. Volkmann to more easily facilitate recording the large ensembles needed to create the Nashville Sound. Today, it is the last remaining of only three Volkmann-designed rooms of this size.

== List of notable artists recorded ==
Notable artists who have recorded in RCA Studio A include:

- Eddy Arnold
- The Beach Boys
- Tony Bennett
- The Blackwood Brothers
- Zach Bryan
- Brandi Carlile
- Brent Cobb
- Joe Cocker
- Leonard Cohen
- Anderson East
- Brandon Flowers
- Ben Folds
- Jason Isbell
- Alan Jackson
- Waylon Jennings
- Jamey Johnson
- B.B. King
- Miranda Lambert
- Loretta Lynn
- The Monkees
- Kacey Musgraves
- Willie Nelson
- Amanda Palmer
- Paramore
- Dolly Parton
- John Prine
- Rival Sons
- Leon Russell
- William Shatner
- George Beverly Shea
- Amanda Shires
- Nancy Sinatra
- Chris Stapleton
- Blackberry Smoke
- George Strait
- Porter Wagoner

== See also ==
- Category:Albums recorded at RCA Studio A
