= United States Post Office and Mine Rescue Station =

- U.S. Post Office and Mine Rescue Station
- U.S. National Register of Historic Places
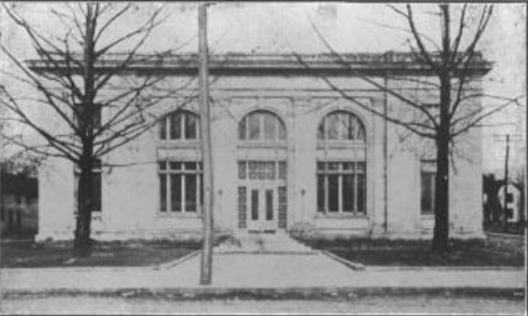
- U.S. Post Office and Mine Rescue Station in 1916

- Location within Tennessee Location within the United States
- Location: Main and 2nd Sts., Jellico, Tennessee
- Coordinates: 36°35′23″N 84°7′34″W
- Area: 0.5 acres (0.20 ha)
- Architect: Oscar Wenderoth, W. H. Fissell
- Architectural style: Beaux Arts
- NRHP reference No.: 84003467
- Added to NRHP: February 10, 1984

The U.S. Post Office and Mine Rescue Station in Jellico, Tennessee, is a historic building built in 1915 to house two U.S. federal government functions. It was listed on the National Register of Historic Places in 1984.

The first floor of the two-story Beaux Arts-style building was a post office and the second floor was devoted to the activities of the U.S. Bureau of Mines and a local mine rescue organization serving the coal mining region around Jellico. Mine rescue stations were outfitted with equipment needed to respond to underground mining accidents and served as sites for conducting training of local mining personnel. Congressman Richard Wilson Austin, who represented the area in the U.S. House of Representatives, was credited with obtaining authorization for the building's construction, which cost about $80,000 (equivalent to about $2,500,000 today). Design of the building was by the Office of the Supervising Architect; design work was started by James Knox Taylor and completed by Oscar Wenderoth. It was built in 1915 and dedicated the following year. The building was considered to be unusually fine for a small town like Jellico. A contemporary account suggested that it might be characterized as "government pork". The facilities for the Bureau of Mines were described as the "best ... hitherto given to this organization". In addition to offices, a lecture hall, and electrical connections for a "motion-picture machine", these facilities included a smoke room, equipped with an exhaust fan, which was used in training miners in the use of breathing apparatus for mine rescues.

A similar combination post office and mine-rescue station was later built in Norton, Virginia. Norton is the only other U.S. community ever to have had a combined post office and mine-rescue station, although one was proposed for Hazard, Kentucky.
