= United States Post Office (Ripley, Tennessee) =

- US Post Office
- U.S. National Register of Historic Places
- Location within Tennessee Location within the United States
- Location: 17 E. Jackson Ave., Ripley, Tennessee
- Coordinates: 35.744722°N 89.5275°W
- Area: 0.5 acres (0.20 ha)
- Built: 1938
- Architect: Louis A. Simon; Neal A. Melick
- Architectural style: Neo-Georgian
- NRHP reference No.: 88001582
- Added to NRHP: September 23, 1988

The U.S. Post Office at 17 E. Jackson Avenue in Ripley, Tennessee was built in 1938. It was listed on the National Register of Historic Places in 1988.

It is a one-story brick building over a half basement. Its front entrance is flanked by iron lampposts and is topped by an American Eagle design. The building was expanded in 1965.

Its design is credited to U.S. Treasury Supervising Architect Louis A. Simon and supervising engineer Neal A. Melick.
