= Buck Dozier =

American politician from Tennessee

Norman "Buck" Dozier is an American politician. He was a council member-at-large for the Metropolitan Council of Nashville and Davidson County, Tennessee and a former mayoral candidate.

From 1994 to 2000, Dozier was Director-Chief of the Nashville Fire Department.

== Education and career ==
Buck Dozier is the Vice Chair of the Education Committee. He serves on the Convention and Tourism Committee; the Parking, Zoning, and Historical Committee; the Public Safety - Beer and Regulated Beverages Committee; and the Budget and Finance Committee. He served as President Pro Tempore of the Metro Council from September 8, 2004 to August 31, 2005; he substituted for the vice mayor when the vice mayor was not available.

Buck Dozier is the vice president of Prime Mortgage, a local firm. He was President of the Nashville Fire Buffs and a member of the Tennessee Fire Chiefs Association. He graduated from Cohn High School, and from David Lipscomb University with a Bachelor of Science degree. He taught high school at David Lipscomb for approximately 10 years in the 1960s and 1970s.

== Political views, bills, and proposals ==
Councilman Buck Dozier asked the Metro Law Department to verify that the city could require all residential-care buildings in the Metro area to install sprinklers, because of conflicting opinions on whether or not Metro could tighten regulations without changes in state law. Dozier voted against Sylvan Park historic zoning, for Lower Broadway historic zoning, for a Westin Hotel on Lower Broadway, and for rezoning Gaylord Opryland Resort & Convention Center. On the third reading, he voted for the proposal for a new ballpark for the Nashville Sounds, which included provisions for hotels, condos, shops and other businesses on the land adjacent to the stadium.

== Mayoral candidacy ==
Buck Dozier officially declared his candidacy for mayor on December 14, 2006. He laid out an eight-point plan he called The Athena Project, which included a more active role for the mayor and the mayor's office, and working to receive a fairer share of state and federal funds to support public education in Nashville. He planned to launch a 10-year capital campaign to raise a $1 billion endowment for the Metro public school system, with the goal of providing $75 million annually for additional teachers, smaller class sizes, pre-K programs, and music and art instruction.

Buck Dozier supported the building of a new police station in an area encompassing Madison, Gallatin Road, and the Trinity Lane corridors, expanding the EMS/ambulance service, and the creation of a new 911 center. He also expressed support for the Tennessee Public Safety Coalition's push for stronger felony sentences for criminals who carry a gun. Between January 2006 and 2007, Buck Dozier raised $316,000 for his campaign. When he finished fourth in the mayoral run-off race on August 2, he stated he had no intention of endorsing either Bob Clement or Karl Dean in the mayoral run-off election.
