= Jim Gotto =

American politician (born 1949)

Member of the Tennessee House of Representatives from the 60th district
- In office January 11, 2011 – January 8, 2013
- Preceded by: Ben West Jr.
- Succeeded by: Darren Jernigan

Personal details
- Born: September 25, 1949 (age 77)
- Party: Republican
- Spouse: Married
- Children: 2
- Education: Vanderbilt University (BE)
- Website: House website

Jim Gotto (born September 25, 1949 in Nashville) was a member of the Tennessee House of Representatives for the 60th District; previously he served on the Metropolitan Council of Nashville and Davidson County, representing the 12th district. The Republican served as a state representative from 2010-2012, when he lost his seat by 95 votes to Democrat Darren Jernigan. His attempt to regain the seat from Jernigan in 2014 failed by more than 1,000 votes according to unofficial results. He had also been employed by Bell South for 32 years, and worked 18 years in governmental affairs. He received his Bachelor of Engineering from Vanderbilt University and graduated from Antioch High School in 1967.

== Political career ==
=== Bills proposed ===
In May 2005, Councilman Gotto proposed to erect a $4,000 glass or Plexiglass wall between the public and the Metro council members. The glass wall would have been built on top of the three-foot wall that had already been there to separate the Metro council and its audience. The proposal was sparked by an incident where a woman reached over the wall and touched Councilman Ludye Wallace, which, Councilman Gotto stated, showed council members are vulnerable if someone decides to do them harm.

=== Views ===
One of the issues that Councilman Jim Gotto campaigned on in 2003 was that he would not raise property taxes for the next four years.

On his website, he states he agrees with Senator Zell Miller's "Deceit of Decency" speech. In it, Senator Miller decries the moral state of modern America and declares he is pleased to present S.J. Res. 26, a proposal to amend the United States Constitution that would define marriage as only between one man and one woman, and S. 1558, which would reserve to the states or their political subdivisions the power to display the Ten Commandments, to recite the Pledge of Allegiance, and to recite the national motto "In God We Trust".

In 2007, Gotto was challenged by the first openly gay man to run for public office against an incumbent in the State of Tennessee, Shane E. Burkett. Gotto won re-election.
