= Danika & the Jeb =

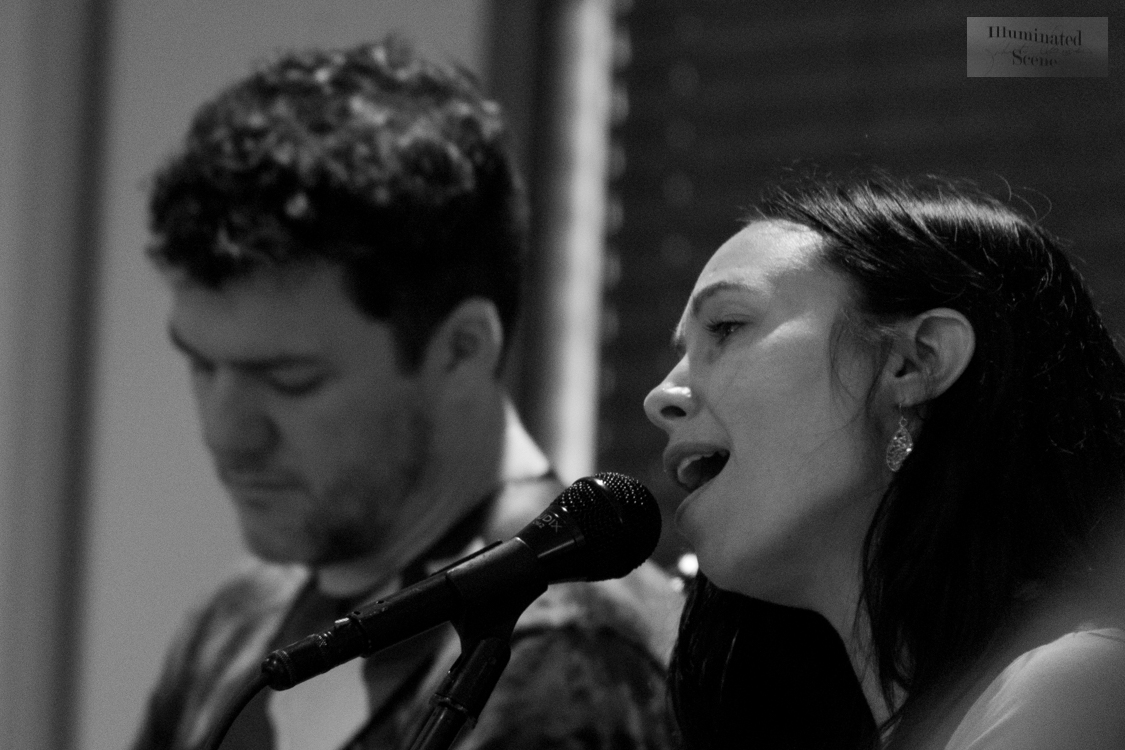
- Danika Holmes and Jeb Hart at Tycoga Winery, Dewitt, Iowa, June 30, 2019

Background information
- Genres: Americana, country, folk, jazz, soul
- Years active: 2010-present
- Members: Danika Holmes; Jeb Hart
- Website: danikaandthejeb.com

Danika & the Jeb are an American musical duo from Nashville, Tennessee. The duo consists of singer Danika Holmes and guitarist Jeb Hart. They performed live in the United States, the United Kingdom and several countries in the European Union.

== History ==
Danika Holmes learned to play the piano from the age of six. As a teenager she wrote music, but she had no serious musical aspirations. Her father died when he was 54 years old. At the time, Holmes taught at middle school and high school, which did not give her the satisfaction she was looking for. The early passing of her father encouraged her to get a master's degree in education so that she could teach at a university. This, too, did not make her happy; she was more interested in music.

Holmes decided to learn to play the guitar. Through learning guitar, she became acquainted with Jeb Hart who taught guitar in Davenport, Iowa. Hart, having played saxophone for a while since the age of nine, had a bachelor's degree in biology and chemistry but was employed as a financial planner. In the meantime, he managed Quad Cities Music Education Coalition as president and owner. The two connected and in 2010, they both quit their jobs to found a band under Holmes' name. Hart had experience playing in different bands as a guitar player, bass player and drummer. For several years they hired bass players and percussionists to support them during live performances. Their music received airplay on SiriusXM's The Coffee House and 150 radio stations nationwide. In 2012 they decided to continue as a duo.

In 2020 the duo had to cancel shows because of the COVID-19 pandemic. They adapted their business model so that all revenue came from online sources. In September 2019, before the pandemic, they already planned on setting up a Patreon where consumers pay content creators on a subscription basis for the works that they put out. Holmes and Hart started selling merchandise, started e-mail marketing and invested in their presence on the streaming platform Stageit.

== Discography ==
=== Studioalbums ===
- Second chances, 2010
- Living your dream, 2012
- Balance, Volume 1, 2014

=== Livealbum ===
- Day #2349: Live at Campbell Steele Gallery, 2019

=== Ep ===
- Acoustic Christmas sessions, 2013
