= Darren Jernigan =

American politician (born 1969)

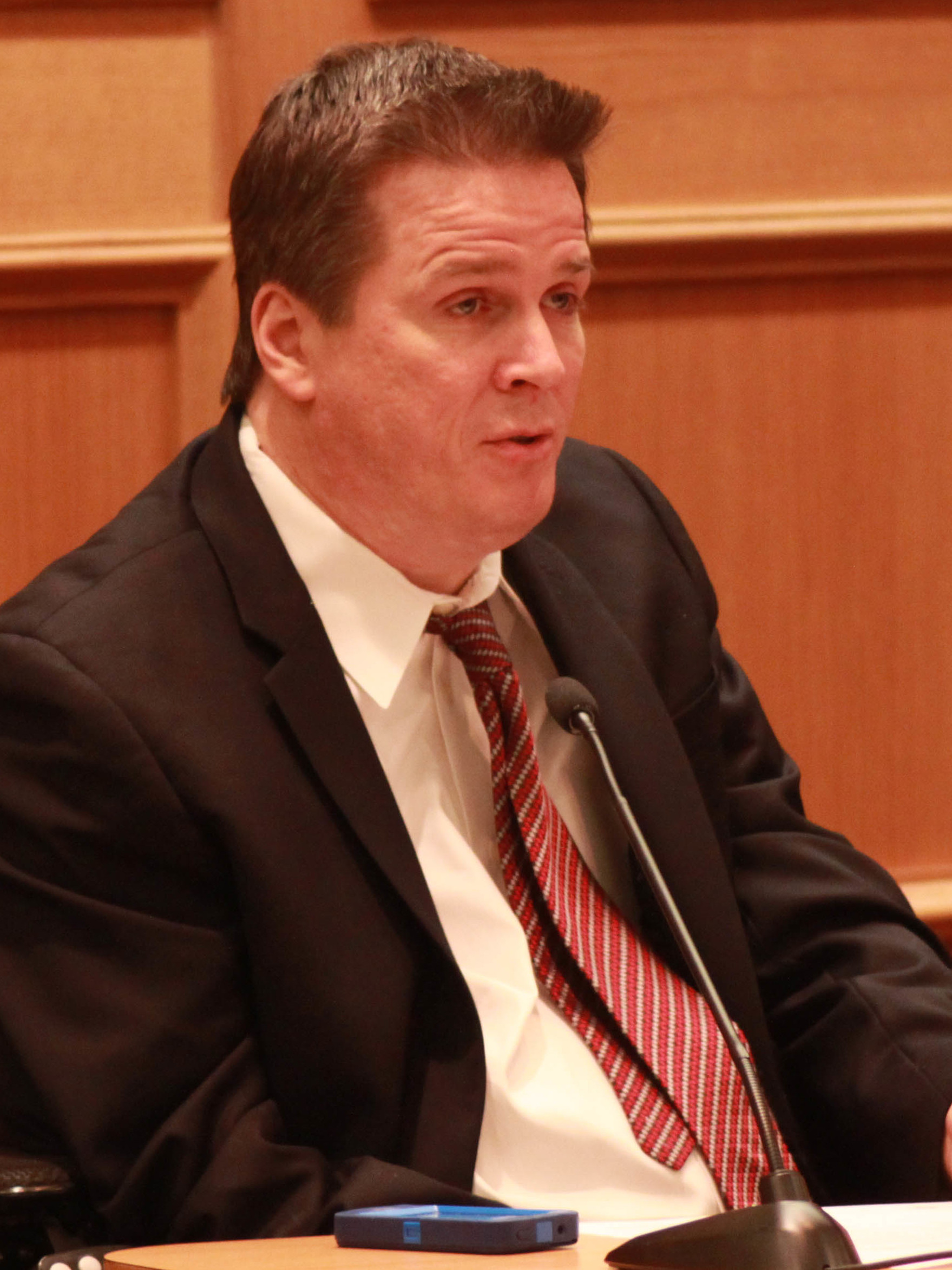
- Jernigan in 2014

Member of the Tennessee House of Representatives from the 60th district
- In office January 8, 2013 – January 14, 2025
- Preceded by: Jim Gotto
- Succeeded by: Shaundelle Brooks

Personal details
- Born: December 7, 1969 (age 56) Biloxi, Mississippi, U.S.
- Party: Democratic
- Spouse: Michelle
- Children: 4
- Education: Austin Peay State University (BS); Middle Tennessee State University (MCJ)
- Website: House website

Darren S. Jernigan (born December 7, 1969) is an American politician. A Democrat, he represented the 60th district (Hermitage, Donelson, and Old Hickory) in the Tennessee House of Representatives. He was first elected in 2012 and took office in January 2013. In 2024 Jernigan retired from state politics and Shaundelle Brooks won the seat. Jernigan also served on the Nashville City Council.
