= Music Row =

Historical district in Nashville, Tennessee

- District
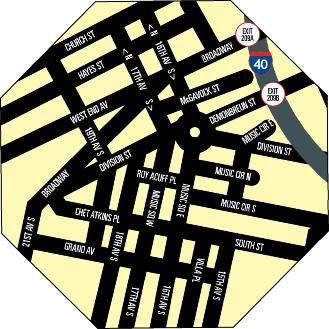
- A map of the Music Row district in Nashville
- Interactive map of Music Row
- Coordinates: 36.148°N 86.793°W
- Country: United States
- State: Tennessee
- County: Davidson
- City: Nashville
- Time zone: UTC-6:00 (CST)
  - Summer (DST): UTC-5:00 (CDT)
- Area code: 37212

Music Row is a historic district located southwest of downtown Nashville, Tennessee, United States. Widely considered the heart of Nashville's entertainment industry, Music Row has also become a metonymous nickname for the music industry as a whole, particularly in country music, gospel music, and contemporary Christian music.

The district is centered on 16th and 17th Avenues South (called Music Square East and Music Square West, respectively, within the Music Row area), along with several side streets. Lacy J. Dalton had a hit song in the 1980s about 16th Avenue, while the area served as namesake to Dolly Parton's 1973 composition "Down on Music Row". In 1999, the song "Murder on Music Row" was released and gained fame when it was recorded by George Strait and Alan Jackson, lamenting the rise of country pop and the accompanying decline of the traditional country music sound.

The area hosts the offices of numerous record labels, publishing houses, music licensing firms, recording studios, video production houses, along with other businesses that serve the music industry, as well as radio networks, and radio stations. MusicRow Magazine has reported on the music industry since 1981.

In present years, the district has been marked for extensive historical preservation and local as well as national movements to revive its rich and vibrant history. A group dedicated to this mission is the Music Industry Coalition.

== History ==
Music Row began developing in 1954, when the first commercially successful recording studios and music offices were established along 16th Avenue South. By the early 1960s, many national labels were completing a significant share of their country releases in Music Row studios, and the district expanded rapidly as record labels, publishers, and producers concentrated their operations there, helping Nashville emerge as a major center for country music recording, and music publishing. Contemporary accounts also noted that by the late 1960s, major labels such as RCA Victor, Decca, and Columbia were completing the majority of their country music recording sessions in the Music Row district.

The neighborhood became recognized for its mix of converted homes and newly constructed commercial buildings, and rising demand for studio space, publishing offices, and production facilities contributed to steady increases in property values during this period.

From the 1970s through the 1990s, Music Row developed into a dense hub for recording, publishing, management, and artist services across multiple genres. Throughout these decades, the district continued to attract studios, songwriters, producers, and industry organizations, reinforcing its role as the center of Nashville’s commercial music activity.

In the 21st century, Music Row has experienced both redevelopment pressures and preservation efforts as the music industry evolves. Despite these changes, the district remains a major focal point for Nashville’s recording, publishing, and creative infrastructure, and continues to play a significant role in the city's identity as “Music City.”

== Points of interest ==
Music Row includes historic sites such as RCA's famed Studio B and Studio A, where hundreds of notable and famous musicians have recorded. Country music entertainers Roy Acuff and Chet Atkins have streets named in their honor within the area.

The Country Music Association (CMA) opened its $750,000 headquarters in Music Row in 1967. The modernist building included CMA's executive offices and the Country Music Hall of Fame and Museum.

The first Country Music Hall of Fame sat at the corner of Music Square East and Division Street from April 1967 to December 2000, but the building has since been torn down and the museum moved to a state-of-the-art building 11 blocks away in Downtown Nashville in May 2001.

One area of Music Row, along Demonbreun Street, was once littered with down-market tourist attractions and vanity "museums" of various country music stars. These began to disappear in the late 1990s with the announced move of the Country Music Hall of Fame. The strip sat largely vacant for a few years but has been recently redeveloped with a number of upscale restaurants and bars serving the Downtown and Music Row areas.

At the confluence of Demonbreun Street, Division Street, 16th Avenue South, and Music Square East is the "Music Row Roundabout," a circular intersection designed to accommodate a continuous flow of traffic. Flanking the intersection to the west is Owen Bradley Park, a very small park dedicated to notable songwriter, performer, and publisher Owen Bradley. Within the park is a life-size bronze statue of Bradley behind a piano. Inside the roundabout is a large statue called the "Musica".

At the other end of Music Row, across Wedgewood Avenue sits the Belmont University campus, and Vanderbilt University is also adjacent to the area. Belmont is of particular note because of its Mike Curb College of Entertainment & Music Business (CEMB), part of Belmont University and a major program in its commercial music performance division.

== See also ==
- National Register of Historic Places listings in Davidson County, Tennessee
- Demonbreun Street
