= Ben West Jr. =

American politician (1941–2019)

Member of the Tennessee House of Representatives from the 60th district
- In office January 8, 1985 – January 11, 2011
- Preceded by: Elmer Disspayne
- Succeeded by: Jim Gotto

Personal details
- Born: Raphael Benjamin West Jr. March 19, 1941 Nashville, Tennessee, U.S.
- Died: March 30, 2019 (aged 78)
- Party: Democratic
- Spouse: Phyllis Duff
- Children: 5, including 2 step-children
- Relatives: Ben West (father)
- Website: House website

Raphael Benjamin West Jr. (March 19, 1941 – March 30, 2019) was an American politician. A member of the Democratic Party, he served in the Tennessee House of Representatives from 1985 to 2011.

== Life and career ==
Ben West Jr. was born on March 19, 1941, in Nashville, Tennessee. His father, Ben West, served as mayor of Nashville and as a member of the Tennessee Senate. West Jr. attended Sewanee Military Academy. He was vice president of the First American National Bank between 1960 and 1984, and assumed the same role at Southtrust Bank from 1987 to 1994. West owned Security Express, LLC since 1996.

He was first elected to the Tennessee House of Representatives from the 60th district in 1985. West served 26 years as a state representative, and announced in February 2010 that he would not run for reelection. West died at the age of 78 on March 30, 2019.
