= United States Post Office (Camden, Tennessee) =

- US Post Office
- U.S. National Register of Historic Places
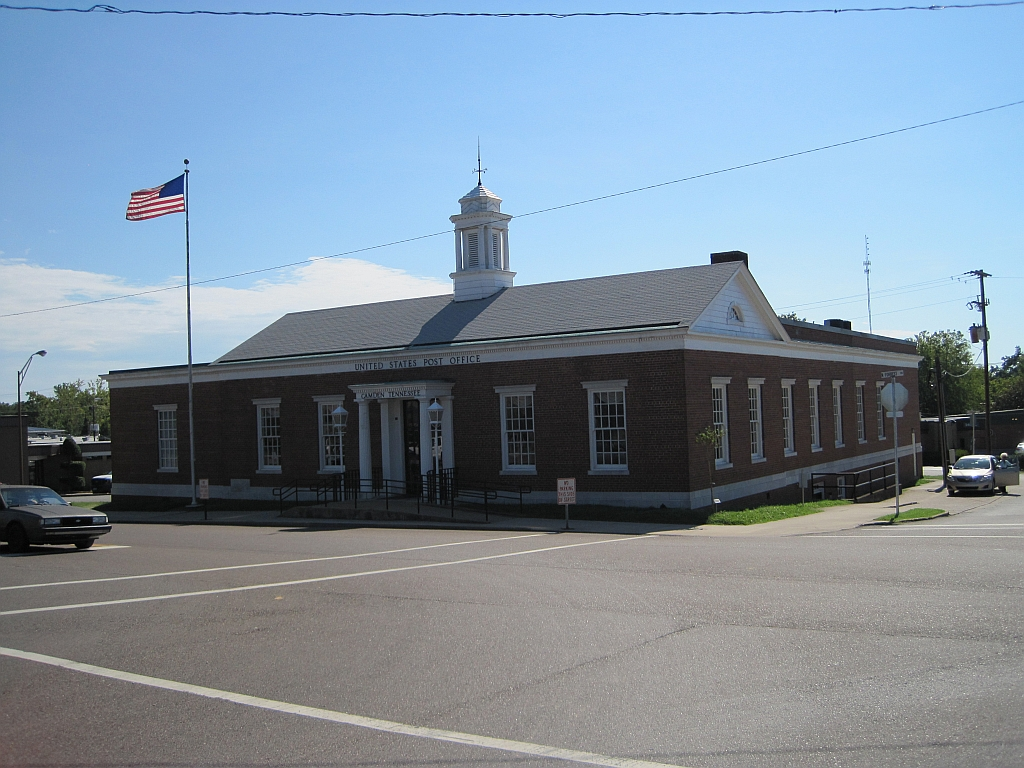

- Location within Tennessee
- Location: 81 N. Forest St., Camden, Tennessee
- Coordinates: 36°03′30″N 88°05′49″W
- Area: 0.5 acres (0.20 ha)
- Built: 1936
- Architect: Louis A. Simon
- Engineer: Neal Melick
- Architectural style: Neo-Georgian
- NRHP reference No.: 88001577
- Added to NRHP: September 23, 1988

The United States Post Office at 81 N. Forest St. in Camden, Tennessee was built in 1936. It was listed on the National Register of Historic Places in 1988.

Design credit is given to U.S. Treasury department's supervising architect Louis A. Simon and the Treasury's Neal A. Melick, an engineer, is credited as builder.

It is an L-shaped 84 by 98 feet (26 m × 30 m) one-story building.
