= Holly Street Fire Hall =

- U.S. National Register of Historic Places
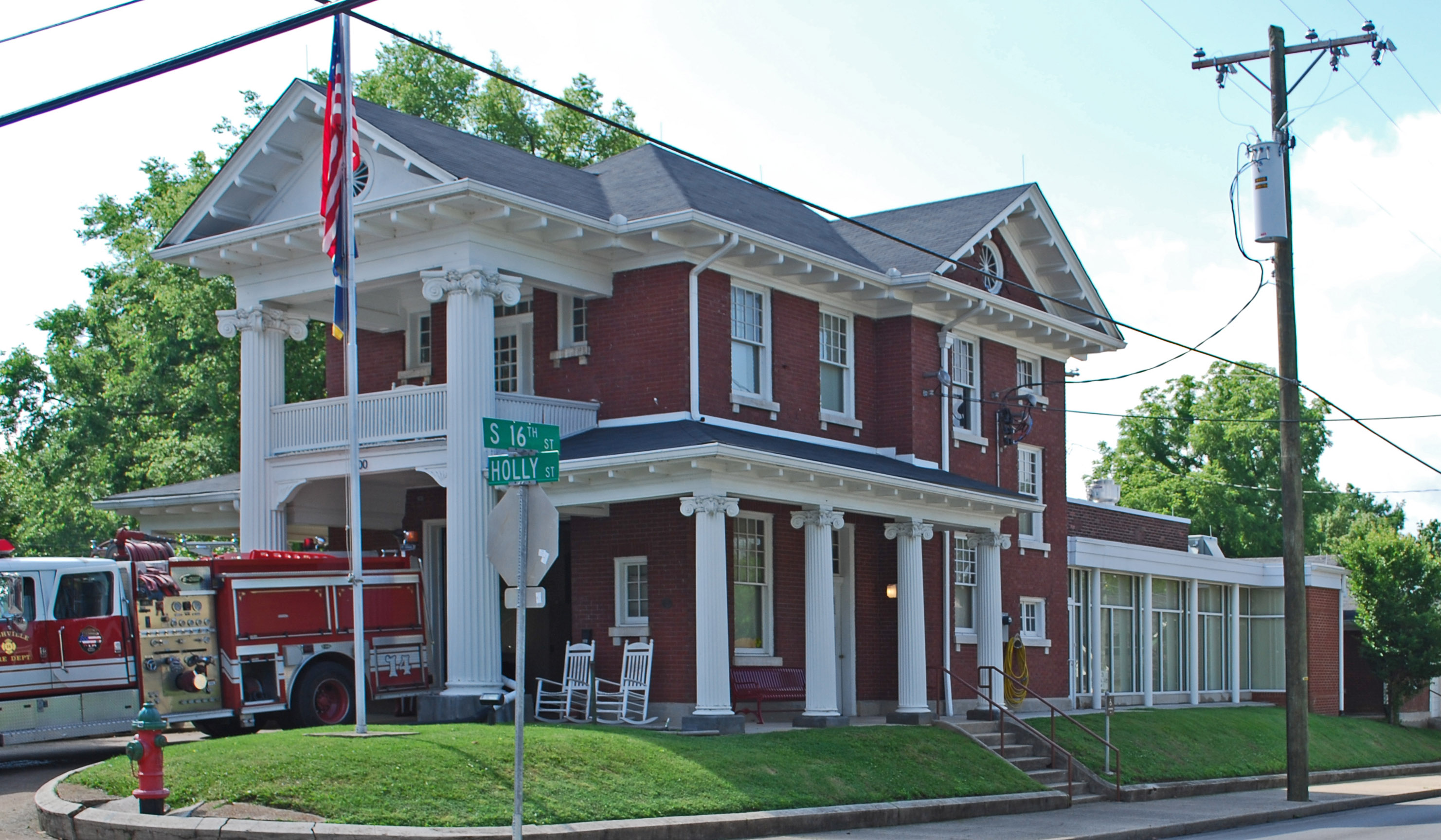

- Location within Tennessee Location within the United States
- Location: 1600 Holly St., Nashville, Tennessee
- Coordinates: 36°10′30″N 86°44′30″W
- Area: less than one acre
- Built: 1914
- Architect: James Yeaman
- Architectural style: Colonial Revival
- NRHP reference No.: 82003963
- Added to NRHP: August 26, 1982

The Holly Street Fire Hall, at 1600 Holly St. in Nashville, Tennessee, was built in 1914. It was listed on the National Register of Historic Places in 1982.

It is a red brick two-story fire station designed with elements of Colonial Revival and/or Classical Revival style by Nashville's first city architect James Yeaman to fit into its neighborhood, a residential area with houses having columns and porticos.

The fire hall sustained extensive damage during the Nashville 2020 Tornado which struck around 12:45 AM on March 3, 2020. The fire hall lost its roof and many windows.

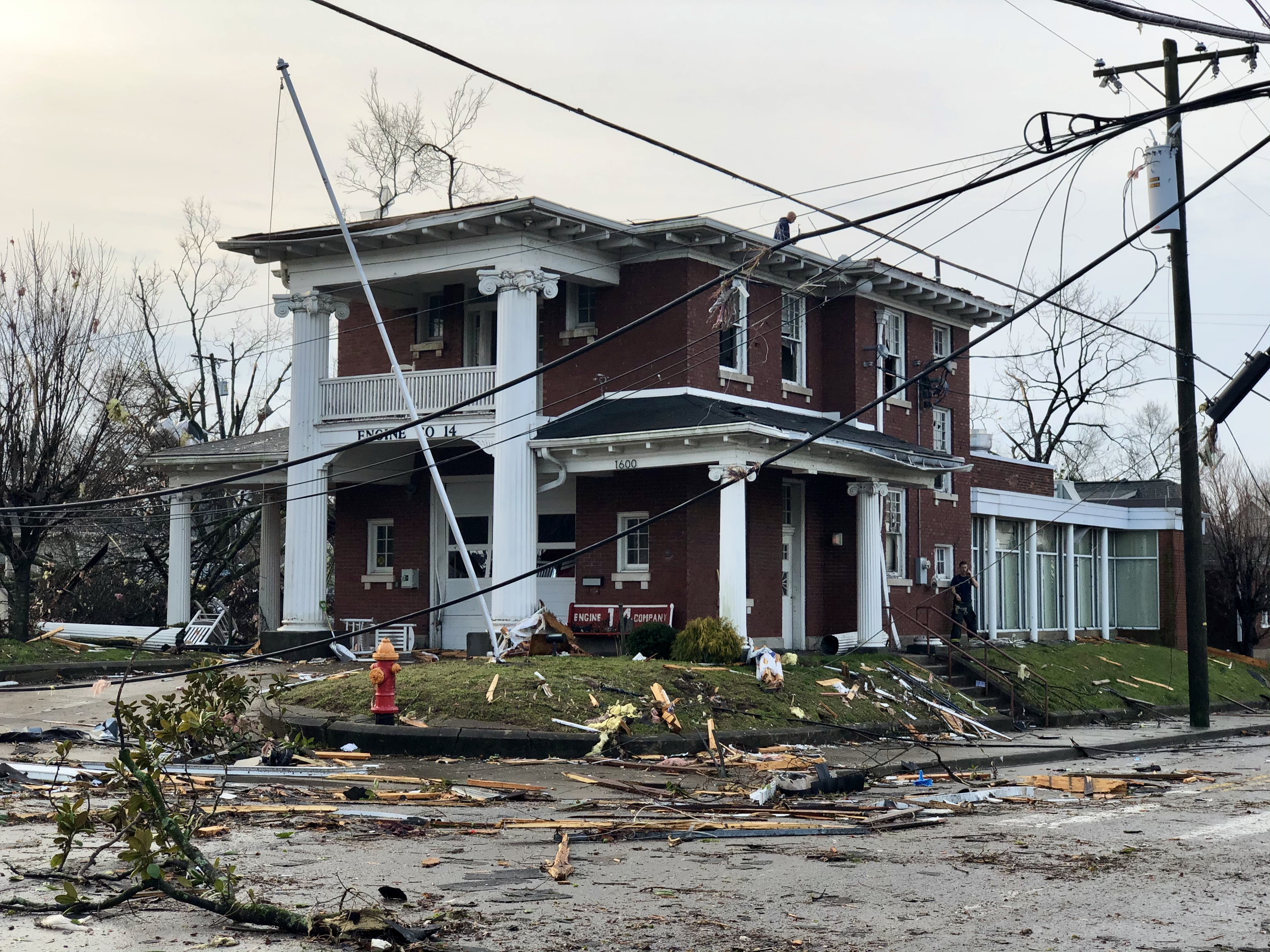
The Holly Street Fire Hall sustained extensive damage from the Nashville tornado the morning of March 3rd, 2020.
