= Metropolitan Council of Nashville and Davidson County =

Legislative body of Nashville, Tennessee

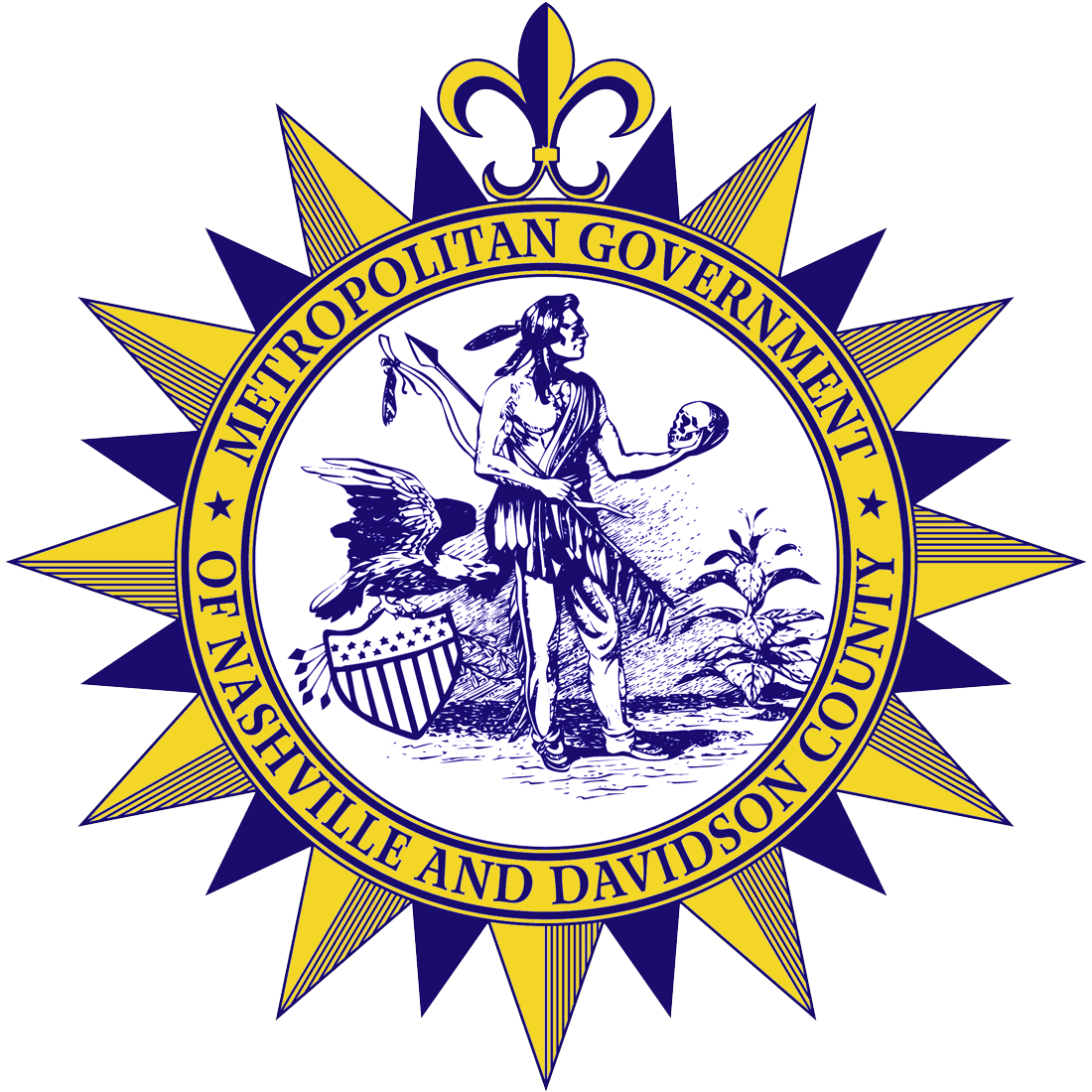

Type
- Type: Unicameral
- Term limits: 2 consecutive four-year terms

Leadership
- Vice Mayor and Metropolitan Council President: Angie Henderson
- President pro tempore: Olivia Hill

Structure
- Seats: 40 Seats: 5 At-Large Seats; 35 District Seats
- Committees: — Budget and Finance – Charter Revision – Codes, Fair, and Farmer's Market – Convention, Tourism, and Public Entertainment Facilities – Education – Health, Hospitals, and Social Services – Parks, Library, and Arts – Personnel, Public Information, Human Relations, and Veterans – Planning, Zoning, and Historical – Public Safety, Beer, and Regulated Beverages – Public Works – Rules, Confirmations, and Public Elections – Traffic, Parking, and Transportation
- Length of term: Four Years

Elections
- Last election: August 1, 2023
- Next general election: August 1, 2027

Website
- https://www.nashville.gov/Metro-Council.aspx

The Metropolitan Council of Nashville and Davidson County is the legislative body of the consolidated city-county government of Nashville, Tennessee and Davidson County.

== Membership ==
The Council has 40 members, 35 of whom are district council representatives and five of whom are council members at-large (Note: The Tennessee Supreme Court ruled in November 2026 that the Council size will be capped at 20 members, though no timeline for implementing this ruling has yet been provided.). If an at-large member resigns or dies before serving a full four-year term, the member's seat remains vacant until the next election. If a district council member resigns or dies more than eight months before the end of their four-year term, a special election is held to fill the seat. At-large council members are elected by the entirety of the area the metropolitan government encompasses. The Metropolitan Council is the third-largest in the United States, behind the Chicago City Council and the New York City Council. The Historic Metro Courthouse, 1 Public Square, is where the Council meets.

Under the Metropolitan Charter, members must be over the age of 25 and have lived within Davidson County for a year at the beginning of their terms. Members must also have lived in the district they represent for six months, and they must continue to reside in that district for the duration of their terms. In 2019, according to The Tennessean, annual salaries for council members increased for the first time since 2005 from $15,000 to $23,100. The members elected by districts represent 15,000 to 17,000 residents each, and all Metro Council members serve part-time. According to the Charter as currently amended, members are elected to no more than two terms consecutively, not including any partial term to which they may have been elected. However, district member and at-large member are considered to be separate offices for the purposes of this provision.

In the 2015 municipal elections, two amendments to the Metropolitan Nashville Charter which would have increased term limits for members of the Council, both at large and district-wide to three consecutive terms, as well as reducing the size of the council to 27 members, were proposed. Both amendments failed with Davidson County voters.

== President of the Council ==
The popularly elected vice mayor is the President of the Metropolitan Council and serves as its presiding officer, but is not a member of the Metro Council and does not vote except to break ties. The vice mayor, a part-time position, is paid $25,230 annually.

Members elect a president pro tempore to serve in the absence of the Vice Mayor, and a deputy president pro tempore once the president pro tempore becomes presiding officer due to the Vice Mayor's death or resignation. Members of the Metro Council who act as presiding officer during the Vice Mayor's absence retain their right to vote on all resolutions and ordinances.

Angie Henderson is the incumbent vice mayor. Olivia Hill is the president pro tempore.

== Operations ==
Two-thirds of the Metropolitan Council are required to constitute a quorum before the business of the council can be conducted. The council holds regular meetings each first and third Tuesday of each month. In addition, with 48 hours' written notice, a special meeting may be called by the mayor or the vice mayor. It may also be requested by the majority of the council, which would require 21 votes in favor of the meeting. Meetings are broadcast live on Metro 3 and are archived on the Nashville government website.

The mayor may veto resolutions and ordinances passed by the Metropolitan Council, but the veto can be overridden with a two-thirds majority of the Council. With three-fourths of the entire council in favor, and not subject to veto, investigations may be conducted by the whole council or its committees.

== Committees ==
Current Council Committees
Name	No. of Members	Chair	Vice Chair
Affordable Housing			
Budget and Finance	15	Porterfield	Toombs
Charter Revision	8	Weiner	Johnston
Education			
Human Services			
Public Facilities, Arts, and Culture	9	Styles	Vo
Planning and Zoning	13	Gamble	Harrell
Public Health and Safety	13	Evans	Taylor
Rules, Confirmations, and Public Elections	8	Sepulveda	Preptit
Transportation and Infrastructure	12	Parker	Evans Segall
Ad Hoc East Bank	7	Parker	Kupin

== Size reduction ==
In 2005, mayor Bill Purcell called for cutting the number of legislators in the council down to 20 in a proposal in which fifteen seats would be elected by districts and five seats would remain at-large. In 2006 the Metro Charter Review Commission scheduled a public hearing on the council's size. In a poll by The Tennessean, 21 councillors favored keeping the council as it is, and nine favored a reduction in the size of the council.

Dissidents said that if the size of the council were to be reduced, being elected could become a matter of who can raise the most money, and special interests may get involved. Other concerns voiced included council members not being able to get in contact with their constituents, the council becoming less ethnically diverse, and council membership changing from a part-time to a full-time job. Councilwoman Amanda McClendon said a reduction in size may make it easier to pass legislation.

In 2023, the state government enacted a law reducing the size of the Metro Council from 40 members to 20. The move was widely opposed by Nashville residents and leaders. In April 2023, a court issued an injunction against the change, indicating that it unconstitutionally changed election procedures during the campaign. The issue was revived, however, when the Tennessee Supreme Court ruled in favor of the reduction to 20 members on November 2, 2026.

== Current membership, 2023–2027 ==
District	Name	Area(s)/Neighborhoods Represented
At-Large, Seat 1	Zulfat Suara	Davidson County
At-Large, Seat 2	Delishia Porterfield	Davidson County
At-Large, Seat 3	Quin Evans Segall	Davidson County
At-Large, Seat 4	Burkley Allen	Davidson County
At-Large, Seat 5	Olivia Hill	Davidson County
1	Joy Kimbrough	Bordeaux, Joelton, Whites Creek, Scottsboro
2	Kyonztè Toombs	North Nashville, Bordeaux, Metro Center
3	Jennifer Gamble	Brick Church, Goodlettsville, Madison, Whites Creek
4	Mike Cortese	Brentwood, Nipper's Corner
5	Sean Parker	East Nashville, Cleveland Park, Maplewood, Madison
6	Clay Capp	East Nashville, Lockeland Springs, Rosebank
7	Emily Benedict	East Nashville, Inglewood, Madison
8	Deonte Harrell	Antioch
9	Tonya Hancock	Madison
10	Jennifer Frensley Webb	Goodlettsville, Madison
11	Jeff Eslick	Old Hickory, Hermitage
12	Erin Evans	Hermitage
13	Russ Bradford	Donelson, Airport
14	Jordan Huffman	Donelson, Hermitage
15	Jeff Gregg	Donelson, Opryland
16	Ginny Welsch	South Nashville, Woodbine
17	Terry Vo	South Nashville, Fairgrounds, Berry Hill, 12 South
18	Tom Cash	South Nashville, Waverly-Belmont, Vanderbilt
19	Jacob Kupin	North Nashville, South Nashville, Downtown
20	Rollin Horton	West Nashville, The Nations, Cockrill Bend
21	Brandon Taylor	North Nashville, West End, Midtown, TSU
22	Sheri Weiner	West Nashville, Bellevue
23	Thom Druffel	West Nashville, Belle Meade
24	Brenda Gadd	West Nashville, Sylvan Park
25	Jeff Preptit	Oak Hill, Green Hills
26	Courtney Johnston	Crieve Hall, Paragon Mills
27	Robert Nash	Southeast Nashville, Tusculum
28	David Benton	Southeast Nashville, Antioch
29	Tasha Ellis	Priest Lake
30	Sandra Sepulveda	Southeast Nashville
31	John Rutherford	Antioch, Cane Ridge, Lenox Village
32	Joy Styles	Antioch
33	Antoinette Lee	Antioch, Cane Ridge
34	Sandy Ewing	City of Forest Hills, Green Hills, Bellevue
35	Jason Spain	Bellevue

== Historical membership ==
District	2023-2027	2019–2023	2015–2019	2011–2015	2007–2011	2003–2007	1999–2003	1995–1999
Vice Mayor (Note: The Vice Mayor is not a voting member of the Metro Council. They preside over the meetings and cast tie-breaking votes.)	Angie Henderson	Jim Shulman (Note: Shulman was first elected vice mayor in a special election on May 24, 2018)	David Briley (Note: Briley resigned to become Mayor following Megan Barry's resignation on March 6, 2018. Pro tem Sheri Weiner and then Councilmember at-large Burkeley Allen served as interim vice mayor until Jim Shulman was elected on May 24, 2018.)	Diane Neighbors		Howard Gentry Jr. (Note: Gentry was first elected in a special election on September 17, 2002, following Steine's resignation. Gentry served as interim vice mayor until his election.)	Ronnie Steine (Note: Steine resigned on April 30, 2002)	Jay West
AL 1	Delishia Porterfield	Bob Mendes	John Cooper	Megan Barry	Tim Garrett	Buck Dozier	Chris Ferrell	Vic Varallo
AL 2	Quin Evans Segall	Sharon Hurt	Erica Gilmore	Ronnie Steine	Megan Barry	Diane Neighbors	Leo Waters	George Armistead
AL 3	Burkeley Allen		Bob Mendes	Tim Garrett	Charlie Tygard	Carolyn Baldwin Tucker	David Briley	Ronnie Steine
AL 4	Olivia Hill	Steve Glover (Note: Glover resigned on March 1, 2022, leaving the seat vacant until the 2023 elections)	Sharon Hurt	Charlie Tygard	Ronnie Steine	David Briley	Carolyn Baldwin Tucker	Chris Ferrell
AL 5	Zulfat Suara		Jim Shulman (Note: Shulman was elected vice mayor on May 24, 2018)	Jerry Maynard		Adam Dread (Note: Dread was first elected to succeed Gentry on December 20, 2002)	Howard Gentry Jr. (Note: Gentry was elected Vice Mayor on September 17, 2002. Adam Dread was elected to succeed him on December 20, 2002.)	Leo Waters
1	Joy Kimbrough	Jonathan Hall (Note: Nick Leonardo was elected on August 4, 2016, to succeed Loniel Greene following his resignation. Hall was elected on June 18, 2018, to succeed Leonardo following his resignation.)		Lonnell Matthews Jr.		Brenda Gilmore		Regina Patton
2	Kyonztè Toombs		DeCosta Hastings	Frank Harrison		Jamie Isabel	Melvin Black	
3	Jennifer Gamble		Brenda Haywood	Walter Hunt (Note: Hunt was first elected in a special election on August 15, 2006, following the death of Chester Hughes on December 20, 2004.)		Chester Hughes (Note: Hughes died on December 20, 2004. The seat remained vacant until Walter Hunt was elected on August 15, 2006.)	Ron Nollner	
4	Mike Cortese	Robert Swope		Brady Banks	Michael Craddock		Don Majors	
5	Sean Parker		Scott Davis		Jamie Hollin (Note: Hollin was first elected in a recall election to replace Pam Murray on November 16, 2009)	Pam Murray	Lawrence Hall Jr.	Frank Harrison
6	Clay Capp	Brett Withers		Peter Westerholm	Mike Jameson		Eileen Beehan	
7	Emily Benedict		Anthony Davis		Erik Cole		Earl Campbell	
8	Deontè Harrell	Nancy VanReece		Karen Bennett	Jason Hart		Lawrence Hart	
9	Tonya Hancock		Bill Pridemore		Jim Forkum		James Dillard	
10	Jennifer Frensley Webb	Zach Young	Dough Pardue		Rip Ryman		Bettye Balthrop	Tim Garrett
11	Jeff Eslick	Larry Hagar (Note: Hagar was first elected in a special election in August 2014, following Darren Jernigan's resignation in January 2014)		Darren Jernigan		Feller Brown		Mike Wooden
12	Erin Evans		Steve Glover		Jim Gotto		Tony Derryberry	Phil Ponder
13	Russ Bradford		Holly Huezo	Josh Stites	Carl Burch		Bruce Stanley	Charles O. French
14	Jordan Huffman	Kevin Rhoten		Bruce Stanley		Harold White		James Bruce Stanley
15	Jeff Gregg	Jeff Syracuse		Phil Claiborne		J.B. Loring		Roy Dale
16	Ginny Welsch		Mike Freeman	Tony Tenpenny	Anna Page	Armanda McClendon		Jerry Wayne Graves
17	Terry Vo	Colby Sledge		Sandra Moore		Ronnie Greer		Mansfield Douglas
18	Tom Cash		Burkeley Allen		Kristine LaLonde (Note: LaLonde was first elected in a special election on May 4, 2009, following Keith Durbin's resignation on January 5, 2009.)	Ginger Hausser		Stewart Clifton
19	Jacob Kupin	Freddie O'Connell		Erica Gilmore		Ludye Wallace		Julius Sloss
20	Rollin Horton	Mary Carolyn Roberts		Buddy Baker		Billy Joe Walls	Morris Haddox	
21	Brandon Taylor		Ed Kindall	Edith Langster		Edward Whitmore		Willis McCallister
22	Sheri Weiner	Gloria Hausser	Sheri Weiner		Eric Crafton		Norma Hand	John Aaron Holt
23	Thom Druffel		Mina Johnson	Emily Evans (Note: Evans was first elected in a special election on August 15, 2006, following Chris Whitson's resignation on August 15, 2005.)		Chris Whitson	Bob Bogen	Eric Crafton
24	Brenda Gadd	Kathleen Murphy		Jason Holleman		John Summers		Horace Johns
25	Jeff Preptit	Russ Pulley		Sean McGuire		Jim Shulman		David Kleinfelter
26	Courtney Johnston		Jeremy Elrod	Chris Harmon	Greg Adkins		Michelle Arriola (Note: Arriola resigned on May 1, 2003)	
27	Robert Nash		Davette Blalock		Randy Foster		Janis Sontany	
28	David Benton	Tanaka Vercher		Duane Dominy		Jason Alexander (Note: Alexander resigned on July 1, 2006)		Durward Hall
29	Tasha Ellis	Delishia Porterfield (Note: Porterfield was first elected in a special election on March 19, 2019, following Karen Johnson's resignation on August 31, 2018, to become Register of Deeds)	Karen Johnson		Vivian Wilhoite		Saletta Holloway	
30	Sandra Sepulveda		Jason Potts		Jim Hodge (Note: Hodge was first elected in a special election on September 10, 2006, following Michael Kerstetter's resignation on April 6, 2006.)	Michael Kerstetter		Leroy Hollis
31	John Rutherford		Fabian Bedne		Parker Toler		Don Knoch	Tom Alexander
32	Joy Styles		Jacobia Dowell		Sam Coleman		Craig Jenkins	
33	Antoinette Lee (Note: Lee was first elected in a special election on September 19, 2017)			Robert Duvall (Note: Duvall was first elected in a special election on September 19, 2006, following Tommy Bradley's resignation on March 15, 2006.)		Tommy Bradley	Ron Turner	
34	Sandy Ewing	Angie Henderson		Carter Todd		Lynn Williams		Charles Fentress
35	Jason Spain	Dave Rosenberg		Bo Mitchell		Charlie Tygard (Note: Tygard was first elected in a special election on November 19, 2002)	Vic Lineweaver (Note: Lineweaver resigned after being elected Juvenile Court Clerk on August 31, 2002. Charlie Tygard was elected to succeed him on November 19, 2002.)	
