= Bill Purcell (mayor) =

American politician

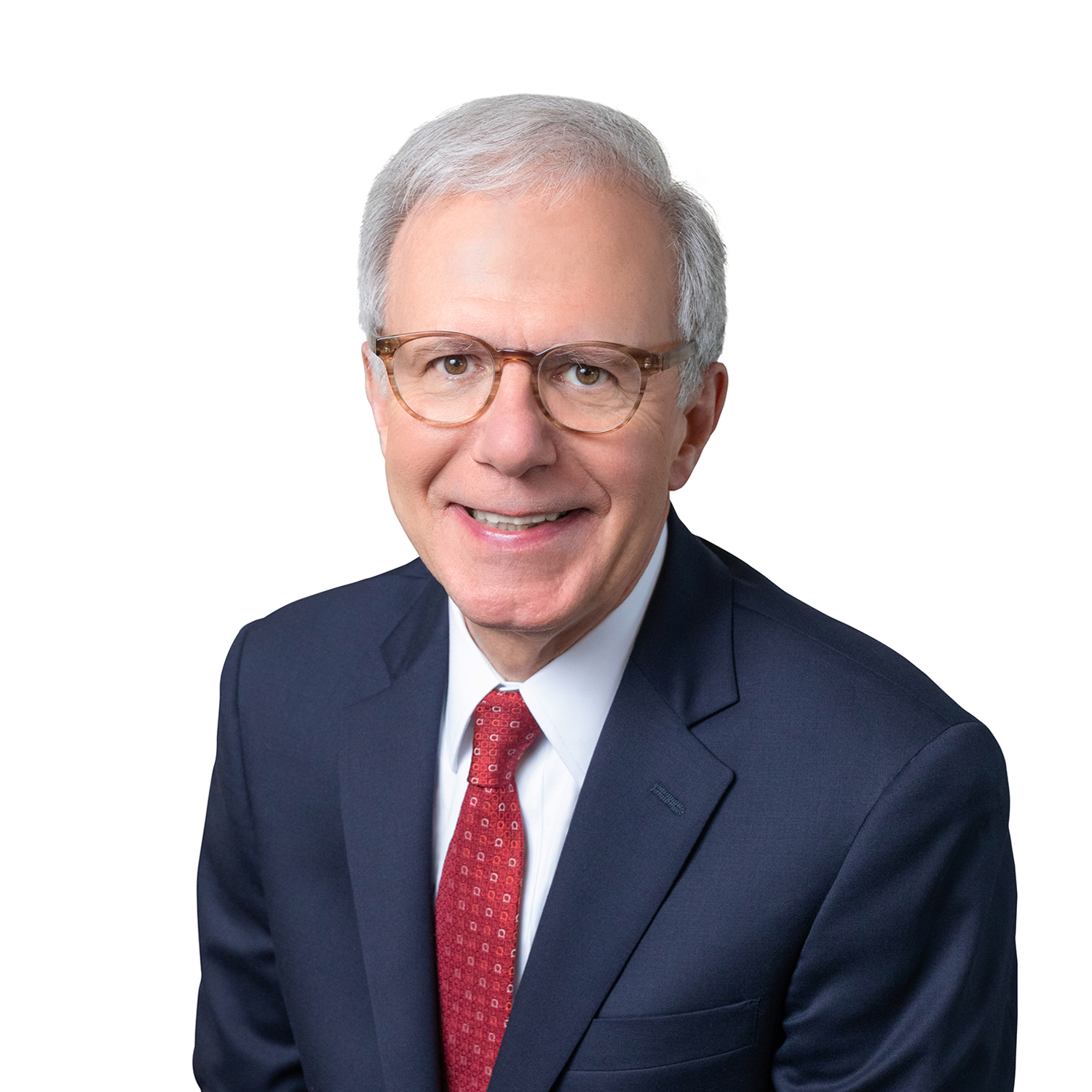

5th Mayor of Metropolitan Nashville
- In office September 24, 1999 – September 21, 2007
- Preceded by: Phil Bredesen
- Succeeded by: Karl Dean

Member of the Tennessee House of Representatives
- In office 1987–1997

Personal details
- Born: William Paxson Purcell III; October 25, 1953 (age 72) Philadelphia, Pennsylvania, U.S.
- Party: Democratic
- Spouse: Debbie Miller
- Children: Jessie Purcell
- Education: Hamilton College; Vanderbilt University
- Profession: Lawyer

William Paxson Purcell III (born October 25, 1953) is an American politician who served as the fifth mayor of the Metropolitan Government of Nashville and Davidson County, elected first in 1999 and reelected to a second term in 2003. He is a member of the Democratic Party. On June 24, 2008 he was named director of Harvard University's Institute of Politics (IOP) at the John F. Kennedy School of Government. Purcell assumed the post on September 1, 2008. He was one of three co-chairs of the Harvard University Allston Work Team. He is now in private practice of law in Nashville and an adjunct professor of Public Policy at Vanderbilt University.

== Early life and education ==
Purcell was born in 1953 in Philadelphia, Pennsylvania and raised in the nearby suburb of Wallingford, Pennsylvania. He attended Hamilton College in Clinton, New York where he served as Vice President of the Student Senate and was a columnist for the school newspaper. After graduating from Hamilton, Purcell attended law school at Vanderbilt University in Nashville. He received his Juris Doctor degree in 1979 and began practicing at the West Tennessee Legal Services agency in Jackson, Tennessee.

== Political history ==
=== Tennessee legislature ===
In 1986, Purcell was elected to the Tennessee House of Representatives where he served for five terms. As House Majority Leader and Chair of the Select Committee on Children and Youth, Purcell's work in the legislature positioned him in the forefront of education, health care, workers compensation, and criminal sentencing reforms.

=== Vanderbilt University ===
Purcell retired from the General Assembly in 1996 to become director of the Child and Family Policy Center at the Vanderbilt Institute of Public Policy Studies, a nationally recognized center building a bridge between academic research, politics, and best practices to benefit children and their families.

=== Mayor ===
Although many suspected that he would run for governor in 1998, Purcell instead announced that he would enter the race for Mayor of Metro Nashville. The incumbent mayor, Phil Bredesen, opted not to run for a third term after discovering that a 1994 amendment limiting city council members to two consecutive terms appeared to be worded in a way that made it apply to mayors as well. Purcell's main challengers were former Mayor Richard Fulton and then Vice Mayor Jay West. In the general election, Purcell came up just short of an outright majority, forcing him into a runoff with Fulton, who announced he would not actively contest the ensuing runoff. The runoff still had to take place per state law, however, and Purcell won. He was sworn in as mayor on September 24.

Purcell was reelected to a second term in 2003 with a record-setting 84.8 percent of the vote. Purcell is the second native Northerner to serve as mayor of Nashville (at least since the merger of Nashville and Davidson County in 1963); the first was Bredesen.

=== Retirement from public office ===
Purcell opted not to run for a third term due to the same amendment that led Bredesen to stand down after two terms, and stepped down at the end of his term in 2007. In the fall of 2007 he served as a fellow at Harvard University's Institute of Politics, and later as the Dean of the school of Public Service and Urban Affairs at Tennessee State University. He was succeeded as mayor by Metro's law director, Karl Dean.

== Personal life ==
Purcell and his wife Debbie Miller live in the historic Lockeland Springs neighborhood of East Nashville. Bill Purcell was a Board of Trustees Member at St. Bonaventure University from 2011 to 2020.

Preceded by Phil Bredesen	Mayor of Nashville, Tennessee; 1999-2007	Succeeded by Karl Dean
