= Tamaha (Dakota scout) =

Dakota scout for U.S. in War of 1812

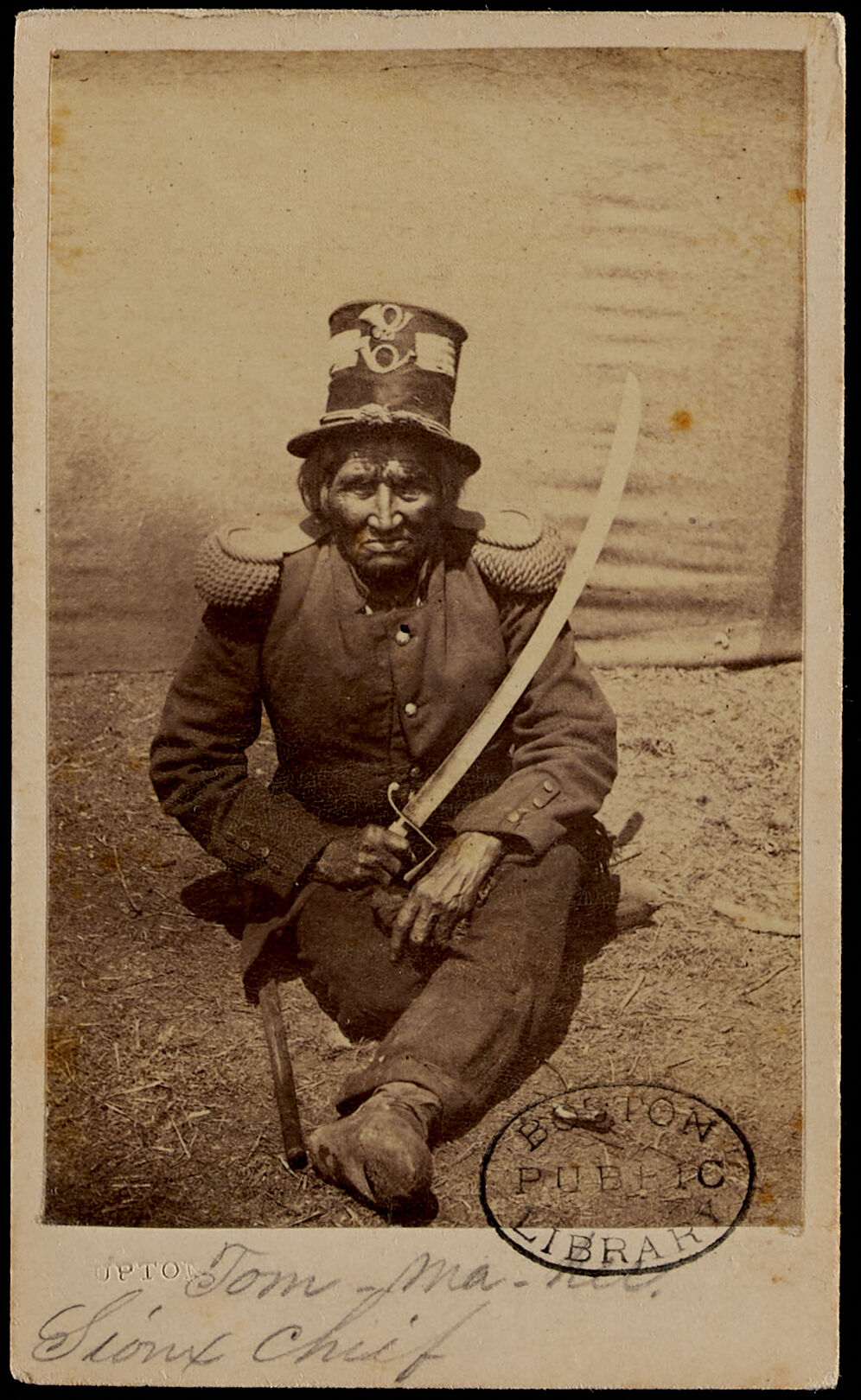
- Tamaha c. 1862
- Born: c. 1776; Winona, Northwest Territory, U.S.
- Died: c. 1864 Fort Pierre, Dakota Territory, U.S.
- Allegiance: United States; Mdewakanton
- Conflicts: War of 1812; Black Hawk War; Dakota-Ojibwe War; Battle of Shakopee

Tamaha (c. 1776 – 1864), also known as Tamahay, One eye, Standing Moose, or L'Orignal Levé, was one of two Mdewakanton Dakota scouts for the United States in the War of 1812, when most Sioux sided with the British. He was a member of Chief Red Wing's band and was presented with a medal and certificate by Governor William Clark of Missouri Territory for his loyalty to the U.S. The certificate was treasured by Tamaha, who called himself "the 'only' American Sioux," and can now be seen at the Minnesota History Center.

In 1805, 26-year-old explorer Zebulon Pike referred to Tamaha in his journal as "my friend" — a reference that has cemented Tamaha's legendary status and resulted in Tahama Spring in Colorado Springs being named after him.

== Early years ==
Tamaha was born at Prairie à l'Aile (present-day Winona, Minnesota), and was originally part of Chief Wabasha's band.

There are many colorful stories about his youthful exploits. In Indian Heroes and Great Chieftains (1918), Charles Eastman portrays "Tamahay" as a young man with "heroic proportions, herculean in strength, a superb runner; in fact, he had all the physical qualities of an athlete or a typical Indian. In his scanty dress, he was beautiful as an antique statue in living bronze."

When Tamaha was seventeen years old, he had an accident that resulted in the loss of an eye. Most historical accounts refer to Tamaha as the "one-eyed Sioux"; French Canadians also called him "Le Borgne" (The "One-Eyed").

Eastman says that the injury was devastating to Tamaha, who then "sought glory and defied danger with even more than the ordinary Indian recklessness." On one occasion, young Tamaha and his best friend disguised themselves as Ojibwe warriors to flirt with Ojibwe girls. On another, he was hunting for buffalo when he was thrown off his pony and attacked by a bull. He quickly straddled the buffalo on its neck and held it by the horns, earning him the name "Held-the-Bull-by-the-Horns".

According to Eastman, it was during his escapade running from the Ojibwe that Tamaha famously said to his friend, "I'll meet you at the mouth of the St. Croix River, or in the spirit land!"

== Friendship with Zebulon Pike ==
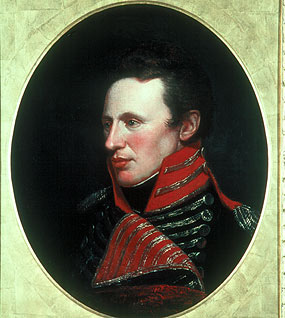
Zebulon Pike (c. 1808)

In his journal entries on September 23 and 24, 1805, Lieutenant Zebulon Pike made repeated references to "Le Original Leve" — a corruption of the French name for Tamaha, "L'Orignal Levé." Pike later compiled a table of names, in which he indicated that "Le Orignal Levé" was also known as "Tahamie" and "Rising Moose."

On September 23, 1805, Pike conducted treaty negotiations with a group of Dakota to obtain land to build a military outpost. Pike wrote that seven Sioux "chiefs" attended the council he held that day, including "Le Original Leve," whom he lists as a "war chief." Historians have commented that not all of them were actual chiefs recognized by the Dakota. Pike himself notes that only two of the seven Sioux signed the land cession treaty (also known as Pike's Purchase), including Little Crow I and Penichon. They agreed to cede approximately 100,000 acres of land where the United States Department of War would later build Fort Snelling.

The second objective of the council was to convince the Dakota to make peace with the Ojibwe (Chippewa). In his journal, Pike noted that the chiefs had replied and promised safe passage for the Ojibwe if he brought them back for peace talks with the Dakota, but thought that peace would be unlikely. In his letter to General James Wilkinson dated September 23, Pike noted that "Elan Levie" (interpreted by historians as "Élan Levé," another way to say "Standing Moose"), had pledged the Sioux of six villages would be loyal to the United States:

"A chief by the name of Elan Levie, then told me to look round on those young warriors on the beach; that not only they, but those of six villages more, were at our command".

The next morning, Pike was furious to discover that his American flag was missing from his boat. He described how he communicated his feelings to Tamaha, whom he referred to as "my friend":

"Being in doubt whether it had been stolen by the Indians, or had fallen overboard and floated away, I sent for my friend, Original Leve, and sufficiently evinced to him, by the vehemence of my action, by the immediate punishment of my guard (having inflicted on one of them corporeal punishment), and by sending down the shore three miles in search of it, how much I was displeased that such a thing should have occurred".

== Military service ==
Tamaha was one of the few Sioux who actively supported the United States in the War of 1812. He retained his loyalty even after his capture by the British, during which he refused to divulge information about the Americans on pain of death (a threat which turned out to be a bluff). According to the Wabasha County Herald, Tamaha also served in the Black Hawk War alongside the Sauk people and Meskwaki as they were allies of the United States.

=== Peace medal and loyalty papers ===
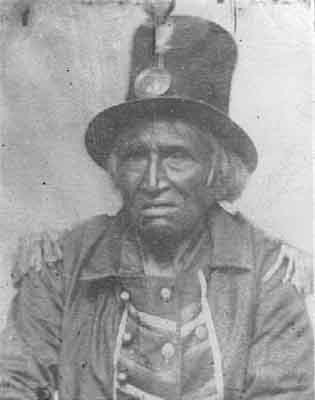
Tamaha (c. 1860) in his trademark stovepipe hat with the "small-sized medal" bestowed on him by William Clark

Because of his loyalty to America, Tamaha was presented a Peace Medal and Loyalty papers by William Clark. These papers can be seen at the Minnesota History Center. Tamaha carried these papers with him and would charge people to see them.

=== Dakota-Ojibwe War ===
Tamaha is noted by the Shakopee Heritage Society as participating in the Battle of Shakopee on May 27, 1858 near Murphy's Landing in Shakopee, Minnesota. The Battle of Shakopee is noted as being the final engagement of the broader Dakota-Ojibwe War.

=== Opposition to Dakota War of 1862 ===
Wearing his trademark stovepipe hat, he was a vocal advocate of amicable relations between whites (particularly Americans) and Indians, Before the Dakota War of 1862, Tamaha stood before Little Crow and advised him not go to war against the whites.

== Death ==
Tamaha died in 1864 after the Dakota War. According to Charles Eastman he died at Fort Pierre S.D.
