= Zebulon Pike =

American general and explorer (1779–1813)

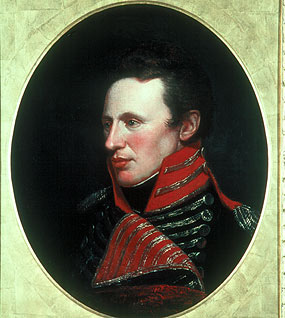
- Portrait by Charles Willson Peale, 1808
- Born: Zebulon Montgomery Pike; January 5, 1779; Lamington, New Jersey, U.S.
- Died: April 27, 1813 (aged 34); York, Upper Canada (now Toronto, Ontario)
- Cause of death: struck by debris from firearm magazine explosion
- Burial place: Military Cemetery at Sackets Harbor, New York
- Spouse: Clarissa Harlow Brown (m. 1801)
- Children: 5
- Military career
- Allegiance: United States
- Branch: United States Army
- Service years: 1794–1813
- Rank: Brigadier General
- Conflicts: Tecumseh's War; Battle of Tippecanoe; War of 1812; Battle of Lacolle Mills; Battle of York (DOW)

Zebulon Montgomery Pike (January 5, 1779 – April 27, 1813) was an American brigadier general and explorer for whom Pikes Peak in Colorado is named. As a U.S. Army officer he led two expeditions through the Louisiana Purchase territory, first in 1805–1806 to reconnoiter the upper northern reaches of the Mississippi River, and then in 1806–1807 to explore the southwest to the fringes of the northern Spanish-colonial settlements of New Mexico and Texas. Pike's expeditions coincided with other Jeffersonian expeditions, including the Lewis and Clark Expedition and the Red River Expedition in 1806.

Pike's second expedition crossed the Rocky Mountains into what is now southern Colorado, which resulted in his capture by the Spanish colonial authorities near Santa Fe, who then sent Pike and his men to Chihuahua (present-day Mexico) for interrogation. Later in 1807, Pike and some of his men were escorted by the Spanish through Texas and released near U.S. territory in early Louisiana.

In 1810, Pike published an account of his expeditions, a book so popular that it was translated into several languages for publication in Europe. He later achieved the rank of brigadier general in the United States Army, and served in the War of 1812 until he was killed in April 1813 by an explosion at a gunpowder magazine outside the British colonial capital of Upper Canada during the Battle of York.

== Early and family life ==
=== Early life and education ===
Pike was born on January 5, 1779, in the Lamington section of Bedminster, New Jersey. He was the son of Isabella (Brown) and Zebulon Pike, and followed in the footsteps of his father, who had begun his own career in the military service of the United States in 1775 at the beginning of the American Revolutionary War. Through his father, he was a direct descendant of Robert Pike, who was famous being an opponent of the Salem witchcraft prosecutions of 1692.

Zebulon Pike Jr. grew to adulthood with his family at a series of outposts in Ohio and Illinois—the United States' northwestern frontier at the time. He was commissioned as a second lieutenant of infantry in 1799 and promoted to first lieutenant later that same year.

=== Marriage and family ===
Pike married his cousin Clarissa Harlow Brown in 1801. They had one child who survived to adulthood, Clarissa Brown Pike, who later married President William Henry Harrison's son, John Cleves Symmes Harrison. They had four other children who died before reaching adulthood. He was the great-granduncle of Medal of Honor recipient Emory Jenison Pike.

== Military career ==
Pike's military career included working on logistics and payroll at a series of frontier posts, including Fort Belle Fontaine near today's St. Louis. General-in-Chief James Wilkinson of the United States Army was appointed as the first Governor of the Upper Louisiana Territory by third President Thomas Jefferson, becoming Pike's mentor while headquartered there.

In 1796, Pike shadowed the expedition of General Georges Henri Victor Collot, a Royal, then Imperial French Army officer who had been tasked to tour the Mississippi frontier and draw maps that France might use if it were to try and seize the lightly settled heartland territory of the Mississippi River valley basin from the nascent United States further to the East.

=== First expedition ===
In the summer of 1805, General-in-Chief James Wilkinson ordered young Lt. Pike to locate the northern source of the Mississippi River, explore the northern portion of the newly created and beginning-to-be-colonized Louisiana Territory, and to expel any British or Canadian fur traders he found trading within the western borders of the newly expanded United States. Pike left St. Louis on August 9, 1805, proceeding upstream by pirogue. He and his crew reached the confluence of the Mississippi and Minnesota Rivers on September 21, where he negotiated a Treaty of St. Peters agreement with the native Dakota Indians, purchasing the future site of Fort Snelling. The expedition proceeded further upriver, stopping to construct a winter camp at the mouth of the Swan River, south of present-day Little Falls, Minnesota, on October 16. On December 10, they continued upstream along the frozen river on foot, visiting several trading outposts of the North West Company along the way.

They reached the fur post at Leech Lake on February 1 and stayed nearly three weeks. Pike informed the traders they were within the new boundaries of the United States and henceforth required to abide by its American laws and regulations. Pike met with many prominent Ojibwe chiefs, prevailing on them to surrender the medals and flags given to them as tokens of allegiance by the British and offering American peace medals. He also relayed the new United States' desire that the Ojibwe and Lakota nations would cease hostilities, inviting the chiefs back to a peace conference in St. Louis (however, both First Nations tribes declined that invitation to travel through several hundred miles of hostile territory). On February 10, they ceremonially shot down the Red Ensign from the fur company's flag pole, replacing it with the American flag. On a side trip between February 12 and 14, Pike traveled to the North West Company fur post on Upper Red Cedar Lake (later renamed Cass Lake), designating the lake as the upper source of the Mississippi and taking celestial observations / calculations to determine its latitude.

Pike and his men left Leech Lake on February 18, carrying diplomatic tokens from the Ojibwe chiefs to present to the Dakota chiefs as a gesture of reconciliation, arriving at their winter encampment on March 5. They re-embarked in their pirogues for the downriver journey on April 7, reaching St. Louis on April 20. Pike's was the second expedition besides earlier Lewis and Clark, dispatched by the U.S. government into its new western territories, and the first to return.

=== Second expedition ===
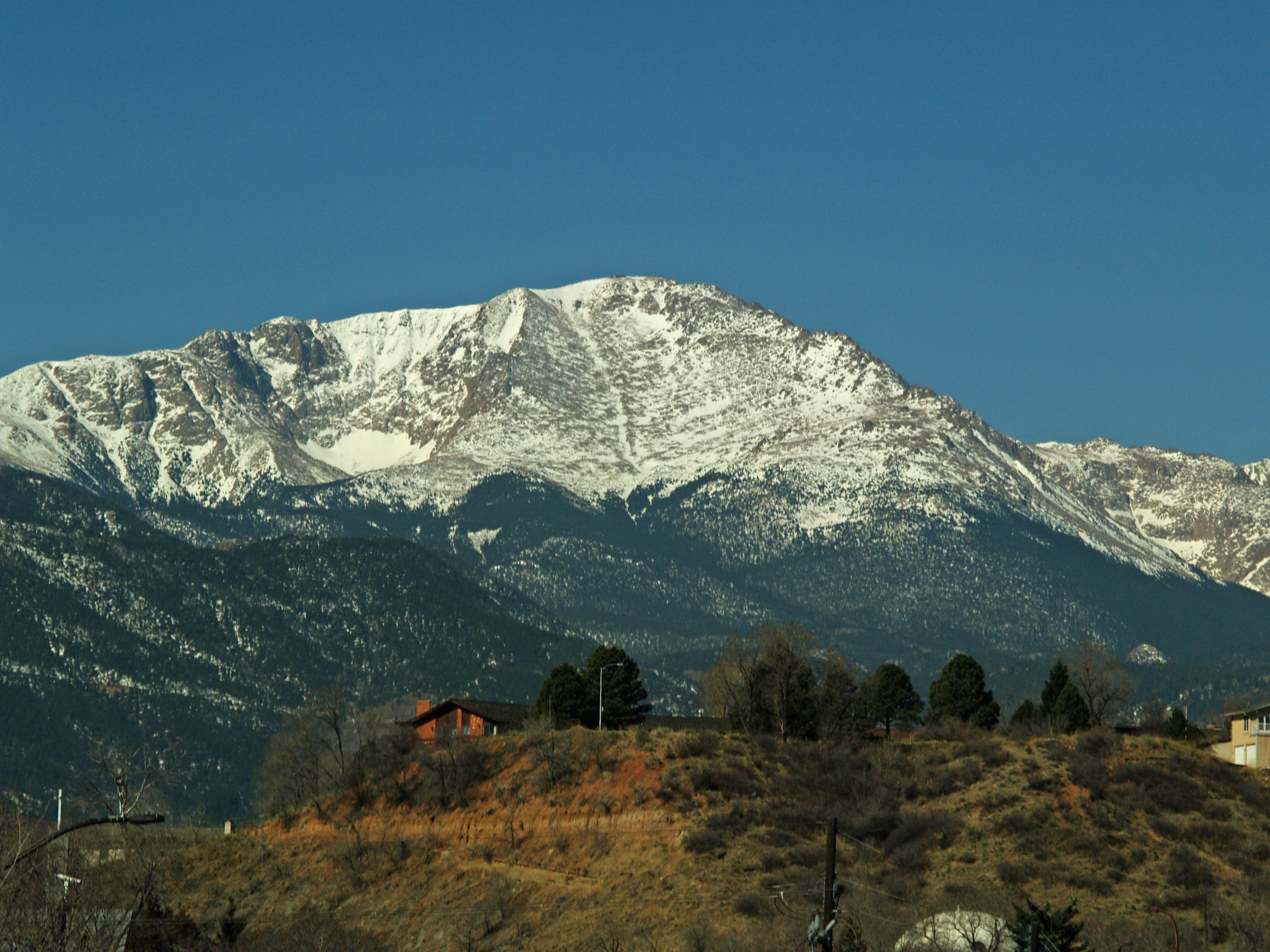
Pikes Peak, central Colorado

After Lieutenant Pike returned from this first expedition, General Wilkinson almost immediately ordered him to mount a second expedition, this time to the Southwest to explore, map, and find the headwaters of the Arkansas River and parallel Red River of the South upstream from the lower Mississippi River. Additional objectives of this exploratory expedition into the southwestern part of the new Louisiana Territory were to evaluate natural resources and establish friendly relations with Native Americans. It is commonly said that his expedition was an innocent exploration of the West, but that is not the case. This was a mission to prepare for a possible American invasion of the neighboring Royal Spanish provinces of New Mexico and Texas over the disputed southwest border from France's sale of the Louisiana Purchase of 1803. Beginning July 15, 1806, Pike led what became known as the "Pike Expedition".

In early November 1806, Pike and his team sighted and tried to climb to the summit of the peak later named after him (Pikes Peak). They made it as far as Mt. Rosa, located southeast of Pikes Peak, before giving up the ascent in waist-deep snow. They had already gone almost two days without food.

They then continued south, searching for the Red River of the South's headwaters, and built a fort for shelter during the winter. However, they had crossed the border, whether through confusion or deliberation. Royal Spanish authorities captured Pike and some of his party on February 26, 1807.

Pike and his men were taken to the old colonial capital of Santa Fe of the Royal Spanish province of New Mexico and on further south to the Chihuahua City capital of Chihuahua province, and presented to Commandant General Salcedo, who was governor of the state. Pike was treated well and invited to formal social dinners but still not quite given the treatment of a visiting diplomatic dignitary, and his men were kept prisoner. Salcedo housed Pike with Juan Pedro Walker, a cartographer who also acted as an interpreter. Walker transcribed and translated Pike's confiscated documents, including his journal. Spanish authorities feared the spread of both their democracy and Protestant Christian sects that might undermine their rule.

During this time, Pike had access to various maps of the southwest and New Spain, and especially learned about colonial Mexico's increasing discontentment with Royal Spanish rule. Spain filed official protests with the United States about Pike's exploring expedition, but since the nations were not at war (and the Kingdom of Spain was rebelling against Napoleon Bonaparte's older brother, who was put in place to rule Spain and was also fighting Great Britain in the Peninsular War), Commandant Salcedo released the American military men. The Spanish escorted Pike and most of his men back north, releasing them at the Louisiana border on July 1, 1807.

=== War of 1812 ===
Pike was promoted to the rank of captain during the southwestern expedition. In 1811, Pike fought with the 4th Infantry Regiment at the Battle of Tippecanoe under General (and future ninth President) William Henry Harrison. He was promoted to colonel of the 15th Infantry Regiment in July 1812. Pike's military career also included service as deputy quartermaster-general in New Orleans and inspector general during the later part of the War of 1812.

Pike commanded the advance guard of an American force which was defeated—primarily because of the poor planning and half-hearted effort of his commander, Henry Dearborn—at the first Battle of Lacolle Mills in November 1812. Pike was promoted to brigadier general in March 1813. Along with General Jacob Brown, Pike departed from the newly fortified rural military outpost of Sackets Harbor, on the New York shore of Lake Ontario, for what became his last military campaign. On this expedition, Pike commanded combat troops in the successful attack on York (now Toronto) on April 27, 1813. Pike was mortally wounded and died, along with numerous other American troops, by flying rocks and other debris when the withdrawing British garrison blew up its ammunition magazine as Pike's troops approached Fort York. His body was brought by ship back to Sackets Harbor, where his remains were buried at the Military Cemetery.

== Confiscated papers ==
The Spanish authorities confiscated some of Pike's papers, which were not recovered by the United States from Mexico until the 20th century. Pike wrote an account of his expeditions, some of which had to be recreated from memory, which was published in 1810 as The expeditions of Zebulon Montgomery Pike to Headwaters of the Mississippi River, through Louisiana Territory, and in New Spain, during the Years 1805–6–7. These journals and maps gave Americans important information about trade opportunities along with the blueprints for the Santa Fe Trail. It was popular and was later translated into Dutch, French, and German editions. It became popular reading for all American explorers who followed him in the 19th century.

Pike's capture by the Spanish and travel through the Southwest gave Pike insight into the region. For example, he described the politics in Chihuahua, which led to the Mexican independence movement, and described trade conditions in the Spanish territories of New Mexico and Chihuahua.

In some eastern regions of North America, a tradition or legend pervades often referred to as The Lost City of Palanor or Zebulon's Gift which has been attributed to Pike's journals. The myth, said to be derived from a missing portion of Pike's confiscated journals, is usually told in two segments. The first sequence involves Pike's unlikely acquisition of a great treasure. The second is a description of Pike's discovery of the lost city "Palanor," said to be built by pre-Columbian European settlers, and his decision to hide the treasure there.

== Legacy ==
As Michael Olsen shows, after Pike's death in battle, his military accomplishments were widely celebrated in terms of biographies, mourning memorials, paintings, poems, and songs, and he became the namesake for dozens of towns, counties, and ships. His memory faded after the Civil War but rebounded in 1906, at the centennial of his Southwest Expedition. His 20th-century reputation focused on his exploration, and his name appeared often on natural features, such as dams, islands, lakes, and parks. Pike's Peak remains the second most visited mountain in the world. Pike's expedition route of approximately 3,664 miles is maintained to this day by the Pike National Trail Association.

Pike was honored in 1901 by General William Jackson Palmer with a marble statue placed near the main entrance of the Antlers Hotel. Pike was later honored in 1926 with a bronze medallion portrait placed in the pavilion at Tahama Spring (named after Pike's Dakota guide, Chief Tahama) in Monument Valley Park, Colorado Springs. For over two hundred years, historians have debated whether Pike was truly an explorer, or if he was a spy.

=== Military ===
- Fort Pike
- Camp Pike, Arkansas (A sub-section of Camp Joe T. Robinson Arkansas National Guard)
- USS General Pike
- A building at Fort Knox is named in his honor
- Liberty ship SS Zebulon Pike (appears in Episode 1 of Victory At Sea, and also in footage at the end of the film Action in the North Atlantic)

=== Landforms ===
- Pike Bay
- Pike Creek
- Pike Island at the confluence of the Mississippi and Minnesota Rivers in Fort Snelling State Park, Minnesota
- Pikes Peak
- Zebulon Pike Lake Reservoir in Morrison County, Minnesota

=== Communities ===
- Pike County in:
  - Alabama
  - Arkansas
  - Georgia and its county seat Zebulon
  - Illinois
  - Indiana
  - Kentucky
  - Mississippi
  - Missouri
  - Ohio
  - Pennsylvania
- Pike, New York
- Piketon, Ohio
- Pikeville, Kentucky
- Pikesville, Kentucky (historic)
- Pikeville, Tennessee
- Pikesville, Maryland
- Pike Bay Township, Cass County, Minnesota
- Pike Creek Township, Morrison County, Minnesota
- Pike Township, Marion County, Indiana
- Pike Township, Wyoming County, New York
- Pike Township, Stark County, Ohio
- Zebulon, Kentucky

=== Other ===
- Pike National Forest in Colorado
- Pikes Peak Marathon in Colorado
- Pikes Peak State Park in Clayton County, Iowa
- Pike Trail League, Kansas high school activities league
- Pike Valley School District, Kansas School District, U.S.D. 426
- General Zebulon Pike Lock and Dam No. 11 in Dubuque, Iowa
- SRAM's RockShox division, whose R&D department is headquartered in Colorado Springs, Colorado have produced at least two shocks the Zeb and the Pike named after Zebulon
- Zebulon Ice, a Colorado Department of Transportation snowplow, in a winning name submitted by a Colorado child as part of a 2021 contest.
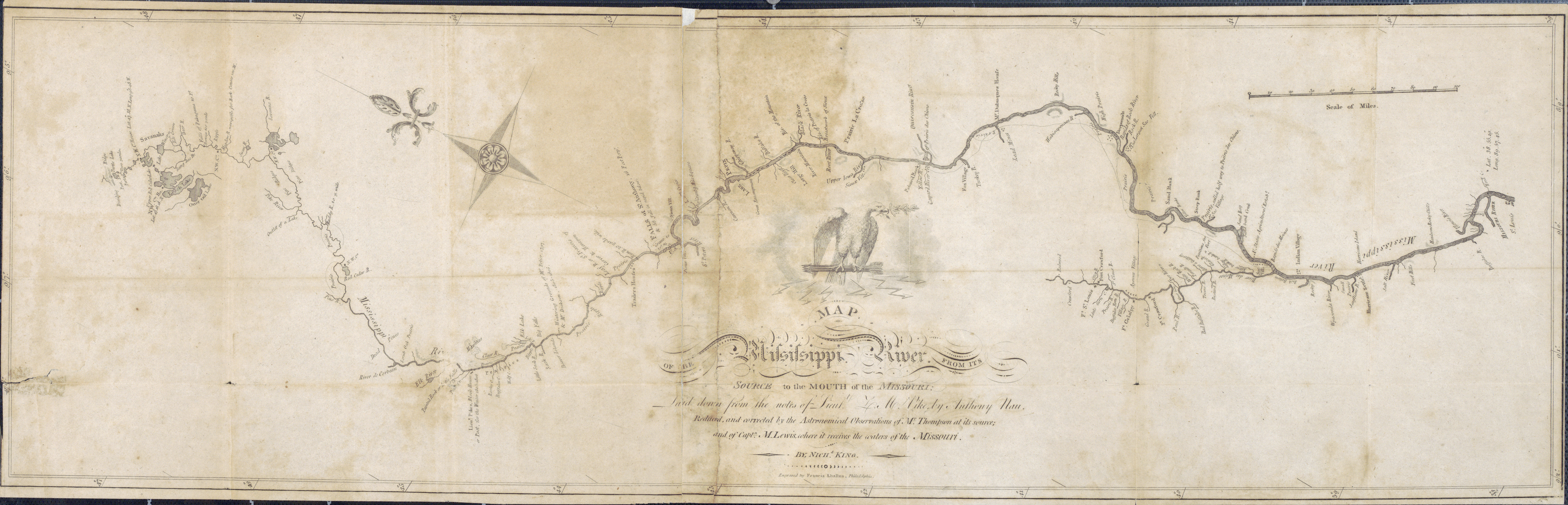
Nicholas King, Zebulon Pike, Anthony Nau, and Francis Shallus's Map of the Mississippi River, 1810

== Notes and references ==
Military offices
Preceded by Thomas H. Cushing	Adjutant Generals of the U. S. Army; March 12, 1813 – April 27, 1813	Succeeded by vacant
Preceded by Alexander Smyth	Inspector General of the U. S. Army; March 12, 1813 – April 27, 1813	Succeeded by vacant
