= William K. Murphy =

Illinois politician, businessman, and lawyer

Captain William Kinney Murphy
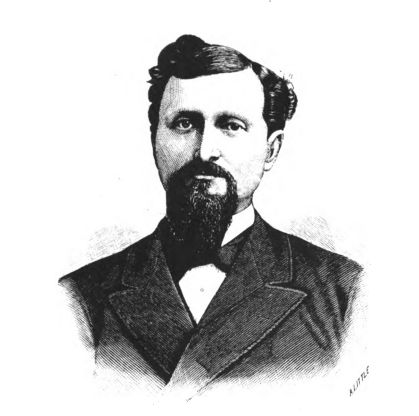
- Sketch of Murphy from 1883

Member of the Illinois General Assembly
- In office 1864-1868

Member of the Illinois House of Representatives
- In office 1880-1881

Personal details
- Born: July, 1853 Perry County, Illinois, United States
- Died: December 8, 1911 (aged 58) Pinckneyville, Illinois
- Citizenship: American
- Other political affiliations: Democratic
- Spouse: Penina Ozman
- Relations: William Kinney (maternal great-uncle)
- Children: 2
- Parent: Richard G. Murphy
- Profession: Lawyer; Politician; Businessman

Military service
- Allegiance: United States of America
- Branch/service: Union Army
- Years of service: 1862-1863
- Rank: Captain
- Unit: 110th Illinois Infantry Regiment
- Commands: Company H, 110th Illinois Infantry Regiment
- Battles/wars: American Civil War: Battle of Perryville; Battle of Stones River

William Kinney Murphy (July, 1834 - December 8, 1911) was an Illinois politician, lawyer, businessman, and American Civil War veteran. During his lifetime, Murphy served in the Illinois House of Representatives, the Illinois Senate, and later ran for the United States Congress. Murphy is also associated for his work as a bank owner and one of the founders of the Murphy-Wall State Bank and Trust Company in Pinckneyville, Illinois.

== Early life ==
William Kinney Murphy was born in July, 1835 near "Four Mile Prairie" in Perry County, Illinois. He was the son of Black Hawk War veteran, Indian agent, and Illinois-Minnesota politician Richard G. Murphy and Sarah Lemen, the niece of Illinois Lieutenant Governor William Kinney, which he derives his namesake from. As a child, Murphy was educated by local Illinois teacher and civil engineer Benjamin G. Roots in Sparta, Illinois. Roots was later a pivotal figure in the establishment of the Illinois Central Railroad and the Wabash Railroad.

Murphy later worked in the livestock trade and sold cattle in Illinois, Wisconsin, and Minnesota Territory. For two years Murphy worked aboard the steamboat Time and Tide in Minnesota as the ship's clerk before returning to Illinois. Starting in 1859 Murphy worked for the law office of William H. McKee in Pinckneyville and was later admitted to the bar, later choosing to continue his own law practice.

== Military service ==
At the outbreak of the American Civil War Murphy volunteered for service in the Union Army on September 11, 1862 and was elected as the Captain of Company H in the 110th Illinois Infantry Regiment. Murphy's only two engagements were the Battle of Perryville and the Battle of Stones River. Murphy resigned from service on February 26, 1863 following Stones River due to poor health. Stones River decimated much of the regiment down to battalion size along with the resignation of many of the regiment's officers according the Illinois Adjutant General report.

== Businesses ==
Following his military service Murphy continued to work as a lawyer in Illinois. In 1866 Murphy formed a law business with Illinois Judge John Boyd and his brother Thomas Boyd in Perry County. Murphy eventually worked for the Illinois Central Railroad and later for the Beaucoup Coal Mining Company located in Pinckneyville, Illinois. According to the University of Illinois Urbana-Champaign, the company was owned by the Donk Brothers Company and operated from 1872-1884 and owned 65 acres of land which was used for coal mining.

Murphy assisted his banking business partner George W. Wall in creating the Murphy-Wall Company, a bank and trust company which still exists today as the Murphy-Wall State Bank and Trust Company. Murphy was also a founding figure behind many different banks across southern Illinois including; the First National Bank of Murphysboro, Illinois, the First State Bank in Thebes, Illinois, the First State Bank in Illmo, Missouri, the City National Bank in Murphysboro, and lastly the Citizens State and Savings Bank in Murphysboro.

Murphy was also engaged in many different businesses in southern Illinois including the Murphysboro Electric Light Company, the Murphysboro Gas Light Company, the Pinckneyville Mining Company, the Southern Illinois Mining Company, and lastly the Hinke-Ismery Mining Company out of Kansas City, Kansas.

== Political career ==
The first politically appointed office Murphy ran for was "Master-in-Chancery" for Perry County, a court-appointed officer who deals primarily with administrative duties and equity within court spaces. A Master-in-chancery is primarily associated with the English Court of Chancery.

In 1864 Murphy ran for a seat in the Illinois Legislature representing Perry County, Randolph County, and Monroe County. Murphy won the 1864 election and initially served in the 24th Illinois General Assembly and was later re-elected in 1866 and served in the 25th Illinois General Assembly. In 1872 Murphy represented the same district in the Illinois Senate. From 1880-1881 Murphy served in Illinois House of Representatives. In 1882 Murphy was nominated to serve in the United States Congress and ran for the elected seat in Illinois's 20th congressional district, ultimately losing to John R. Thomas. In 1883 President of the United States Grover Cleveland appointed Murphy as the Collector of Internal Revenue headquartered in Cairo, Illinois.

== Personal life and death ==
Murphy was married to Penina Ozburn on April 18, 1860. Penina was the daughter of Illinois Senator and Mexican–American War veteran Hawkins S. Ozburn (1808-1868). Together William and Penina had four children, two of whom survived infancy; Hawkins O. Murphy and Sara Verina Murphy. Murphy died on December 11, 1911 and is buried in Pinckneyville, Illinois.
