= Lincoln School (Pikeville, Tennessee) =

- U.S. National Register of Historic Places
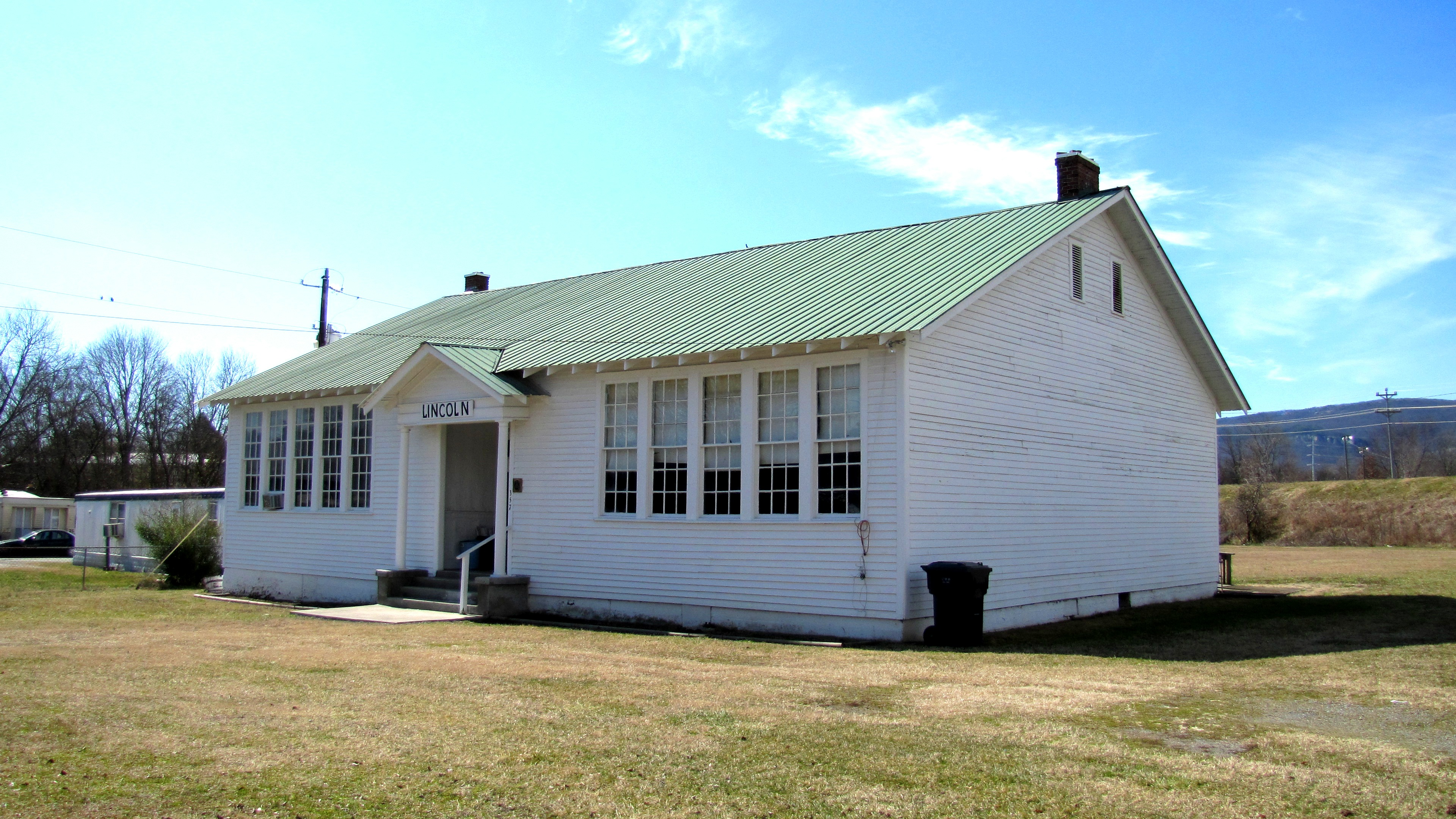

- Location within Tennessee Location within the United States
- Location: Old TN 28 near Rockford Rd., Pikeville, Tennessee
- Coordinates: 35°36′44″N 85°11′26″W
- Area: 2 acres (0.81 ha)
- Built: 1925
- Architect: Samuel L. Smith
- Architectural style: Bungalow/American craftsman
- NRHP reference No.: 93000648
- Added to NRHP: July 15, 1993

Lincoln School, also known as the Lincoln Consolidated Rosenwald School, is a former African-American school in Pikeville, Tennessee, that is listed on the National Register of Historic Places.

The school was built in 1925 with assistance from the Rosenwald Fund to house a black school that previously had been located in the Pikeville Chapel African Methodist Episcopal Zion Church. The building design is characteristic of a Rosenwald school, with a gable roof, tall narrow batteries of windows, and short piers. The school operated until 1965, educating children from kindergarten through grade 8. It was listed on the National Register in 1993.
