= Richard G. Murphy =

American politician and settler

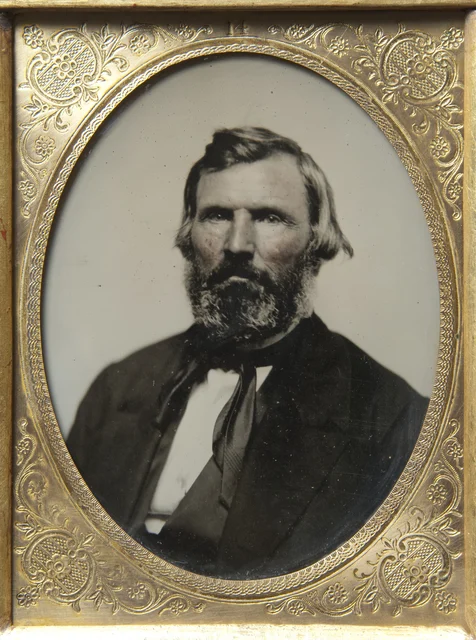
- Murphy c. 1858

Member of the Minnesota Senate from the 7th District
- In office December 2, 1857 – December 6, 1859
- Preceded by: Position established
- Succeeded by: J.F. Baldwin

President pro tempore of the Minnesota Senate
- In office 1857-1858
- Preceded by: John B. Brisbin (as Territorial Senate)
- Succeeded by: William Holcombe

Personal details
- Born: January 1, 1801 Smith County, Tennessee
- Died: January 10, 1875 (aged 74) Shakopee, Minnesota
- Resting place: Valley Cemetery; Shakopee, Minnesota
- Other political affiliations: Independent
- Occupation: Justice of the Peace; Politician; Indian Agent

Military service
- Allegiance: United States of America
- Branch/service: Illinois Militia
- Years of service: 1831-1832
- Rank: Orderly Sergeant
- Unit: Captain Adair's Company, 3rd Regiment of Illinois Mounted Volunteers
- Battles/wars: Black Hawk War: Battle of Bad Axe

Richard G. Murphy (January 1, 1801 - January 10, 1875) was an American politician, soldier, settler, Indian agent, and prominent business owner who settled various portions of the modern-day city of Shakopee, Minnesota.

== Early life ==
Richard G. Murphy was born on January 1, 1801 in Smith County, Tennessee. Murphy's father, John Murphy, was of Northern Irish heritage and was a Patriot who served in the American Revolutionary War at the Battle of Kings Mountain. Murphy's family moved to Illinois Territory around 1818 and settled in Perry County, Illinois. Richard Murphy was a public servant while in Perry County and served in a variety of civil roles in the local county government including both justice of the peace (1827-1829) and county treasurer (1829-1830).

From 1831-1832 Murphy served as an Orderly Sergeant with his brother William in Captain William Adairs Company in the Illinois Militia during the Black Hawk War. Adair's company belonged to the 3rd Regiment of the 3rd Brigade of Illinois Mounted Volunteers and served under General Henry Atkinson. According to the book Combined history of Randolph, Monroe and Perry counties, Illinois Murphy took part in the Battle of Bad Axe.

Following his militia service Murphy ran for political office representing Perry County and Randolph County in Illinois. Murphy was eventually elected as a member of the Illinois House of Representatives and served from 1832-1842 and 1851 in the Illinois General Assembly. Murphy served in the Illinois General Assembly during the same time as Illinois Representative Abraham Lincoln and is mentioned periodically throughout the Lincoln Papers.

== Minnesota ==
=== Indian Agent ===
In 1848 President of the United States James K. Polk appointed Murphy to be the Indian agent for the St. Peter Indian Agency in Minnesota Territory. Murphy first arrived at Fort Snelling in Minnesota Territory in 1848 as the appointed agent to the Dakota people living on the Minnesota River. The St. Peter Agency was originally established in 1820 under Lawrence Taliaferro, who served as the agency's first administrator and agent from 1820-1839. The St. Peter Agency was headquartered along the Minnesota River just outside of Fort Snelling and was used as a way to negotiate between the warring Ojibwe and Dakota people in Minnesota. From 1848-1849 Murphy briefly served as an agent to the Dakota of the Mdewakanton, Sisseton, and Wahpeton tribes of the Minnesota River valley. Murphy was eventually replaced as the agent for the St. Peter Agency in 1849 by Nathaniel McLean on December 3, 1849 and would serve from 1850-1853.

In 1853 President Franklin Pierce appointed Murphy as McLean's replacement. In 1854 Murphy's family moved to Shakopee to be with him. It can be summarized that Murphy's second term as an Indian agent in Minnesota was marked with ineptitude and severe neglect. From 1853-1855 Murphy was involved in several different affairs which turned out poorly due to his own mismanagement. One such incident during Murphy's second term occurred in 1855 at Fort Ridgely when Murphy allowed pork and flour for the Dakota's rations to expire and later to be handed out at the Upper Sioux Agency and the Lower Sioux Agency. This was reported directly to Fort Ridgely's commandant, Major Hannibal Day and commander Lieutenant Colonel Francis Lee, who chastised Murphy for allowing government rations to expire and for allowing the Dakota to starve. Lieutenant Colonel Lee later reported that despite being in charge of the Upper and Lower Sioux Agencies for over a year, Murphy had only physically been at the agencies three times. Murphy also became known for embezzling annuity payments or withholding annuities and goods from the Dakota which caused substantial grievances.

=== Minnesota Politics ===
Murphy was first elected to the Minnesota Legislature as a senator in the Minnesota Senate from December 2, 1857 until December 6, 1858. Murphy later served as the President pro tempore of the Minnesota senate from 1857-1858. Lieutenant Governor of Minnesota William Holcombe eventually replaced Murphy as the President of the Minnesota Senate on June 3, 1858.

=== Shakopee and Businesses ===
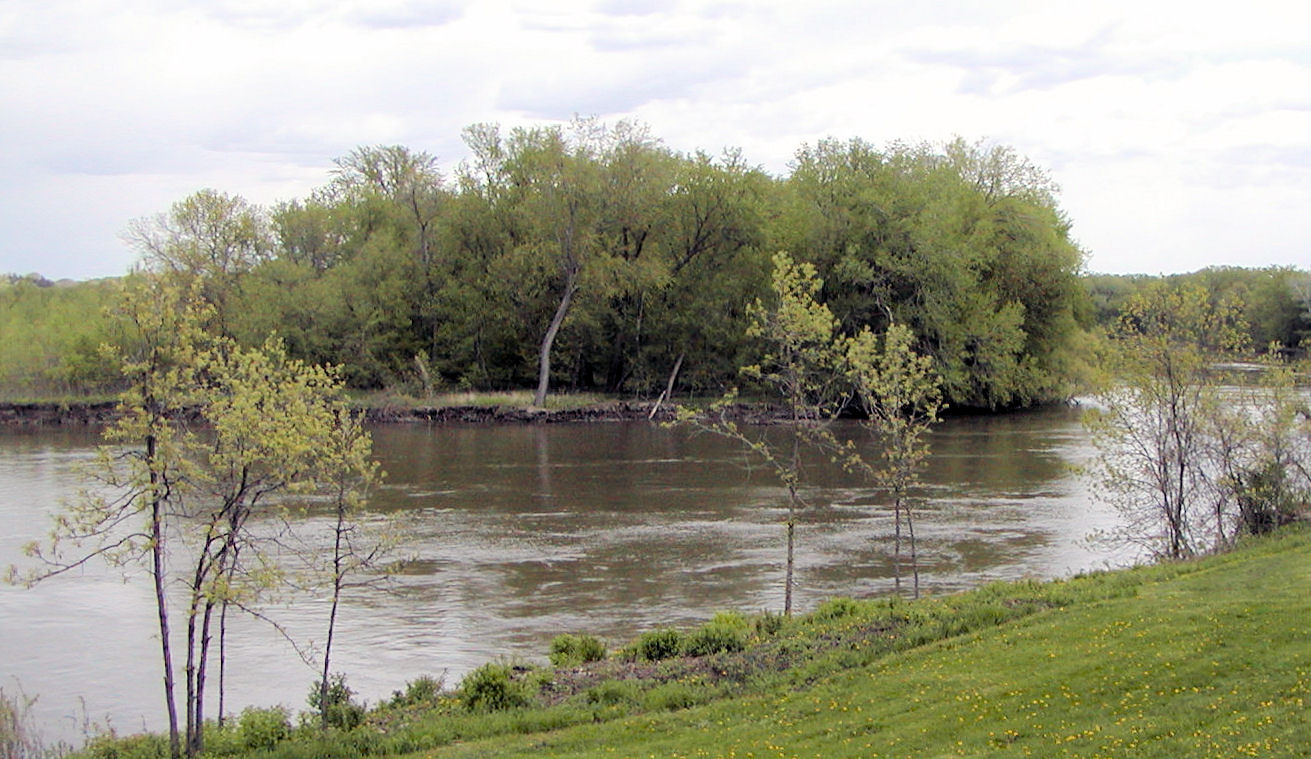
Ferry landing at Murphy's Landing in Shakopee, Minnesota

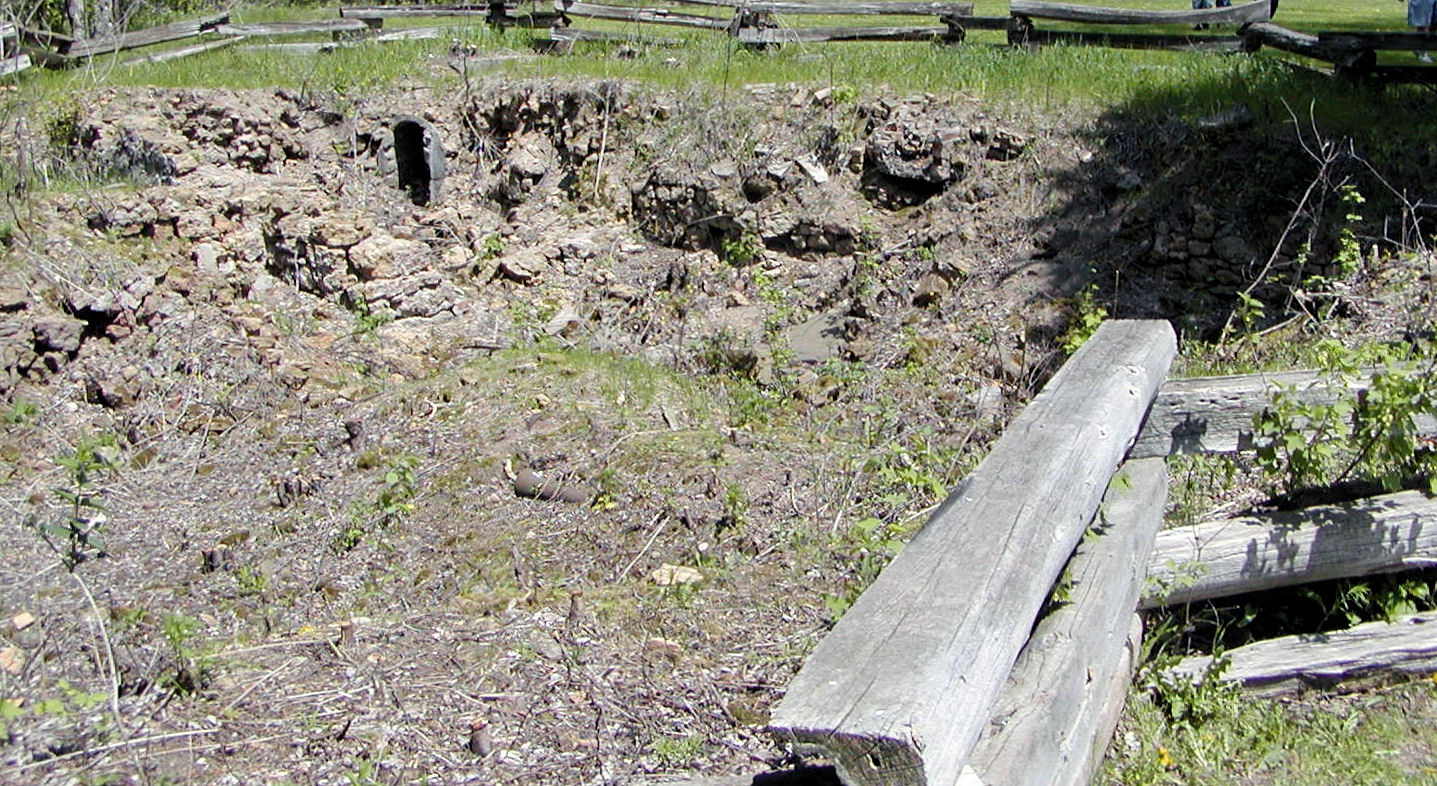
Ruins of Murphy's Inn

Murphy first settled in what is now Shakopee, Minnesota near a Dakota village known to the Mdewakanton Dakota as Tinta Otunwe (English: village of the prairies). While living in Shakopee Murphy established two major businesses. Murphy's first major business was running an Inn named "Murphy's Inn" near the Minnesota River in Shakopee. Murphy's second major business was operating a ferry on the nearby Minnesota River which was named "Murphy's Ferry" or "Murphy's Landing" dependent on the source, a license was granted for Murphy to operate the ferry on July 3, 1854. During the Battle of Shakopee in 1858 the Ojibwe paid Murphy to use his river ferry to ford the Minnesota River in order to fight the Dakota.

== Personal life and death ==
Murphy was married on September 2, 1834 to Sarah Lemen (1809-1846) in St. Clair County, Illinois. Sarah was the niece of Illinois Lieutenant Governor William Kinney. Together the Murphys had five children; one of whom was Captain William Kinney Murphy who served in Company H of the 110th Illinois Infantry Regiment during the American Civil War. William Murphy later served in the Illinois Senate. Murphy's second wife was Nancy Glore, who he married on April 17, 1851 in Randolph, Illinois.

Murphy died on January 10, 1875 in Shakopee, he is buried in Valley Cemetery in Shakopee.

== Legacy ==
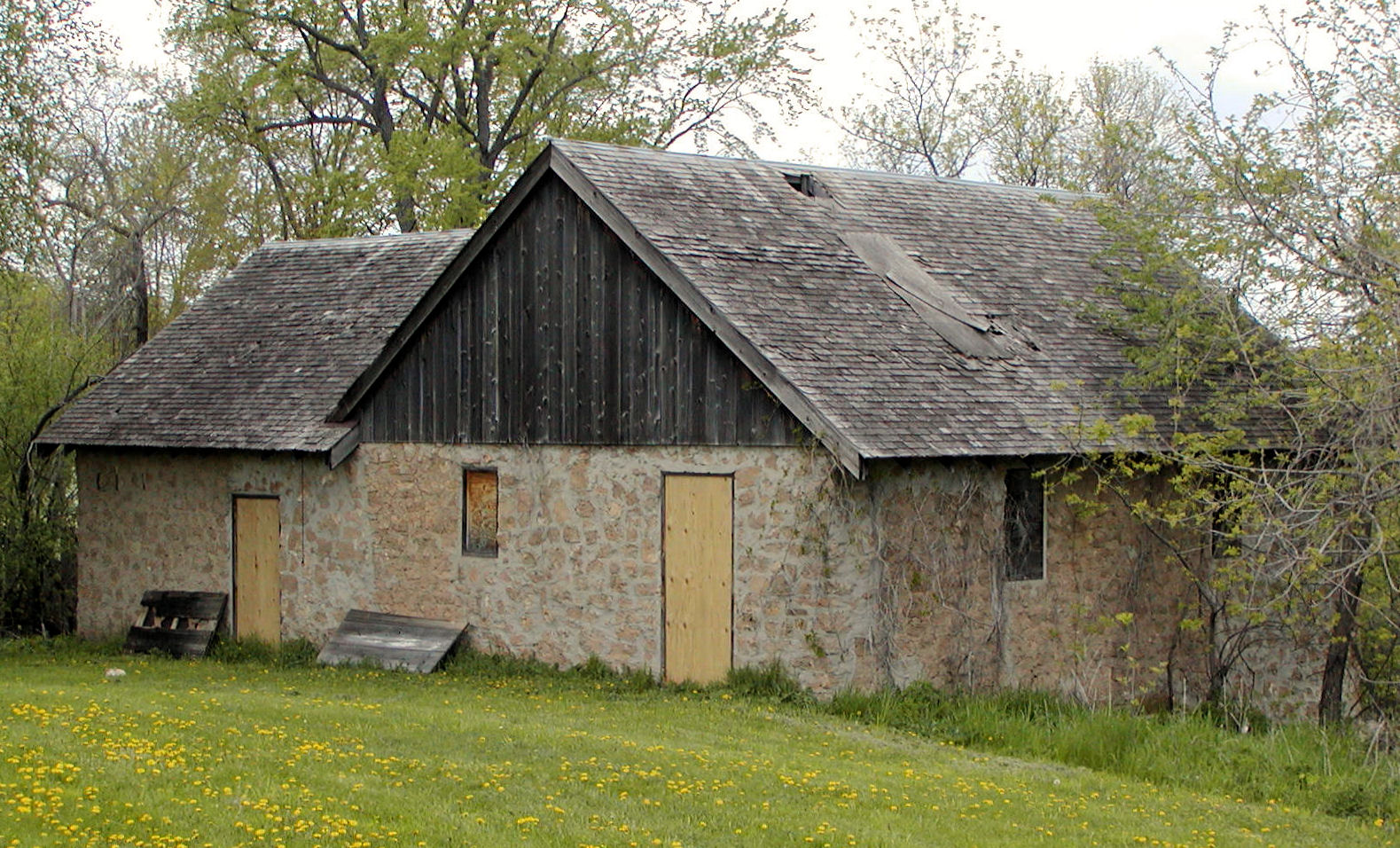
The gristmill at Murphy's Landing, part of the Shakopee Historic District

Today, Murphy is remembered in the city of Shakopee and Scott County for both his hotel and his ferry crossing which are both now part of the Three Rivers Park District. Likewise, "The Landing", previously known as "Murphy's Landing", is a now a heritage centre and park which consists of several historical buildings including Oliver Faribault trapper log cabin, the Episcopal Church of the Transfiguration (originally from Belle Plaine, Minnesota), and a gristmill. Portions of Murphy's old properties are now part of the Shakopee Historic District which is listed on the National Register of Historic Places.
