= Bellview School =

- U.S. National Register of Historic Places
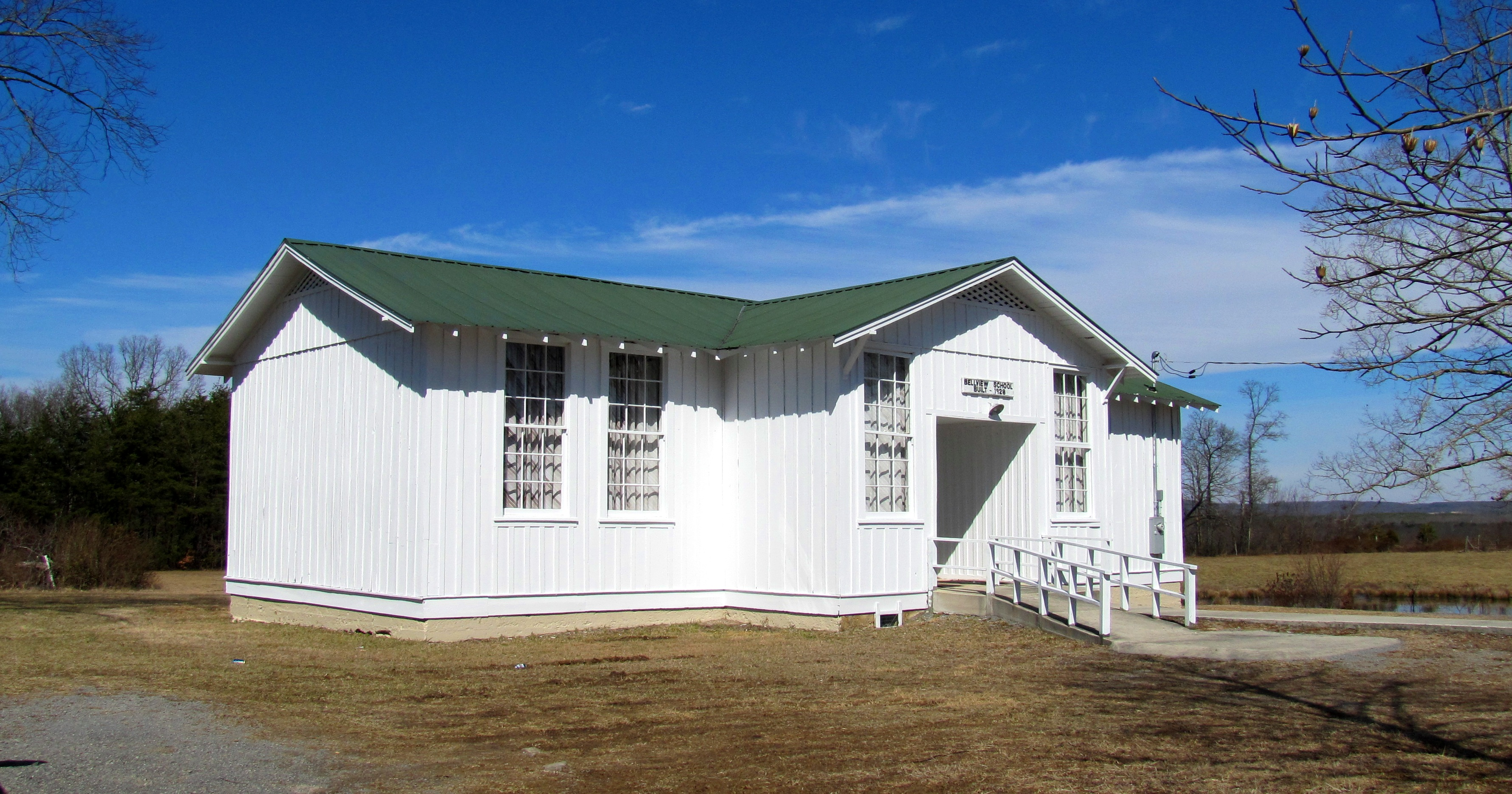

- Location within Tennessee
- Location: State Route 101 near Pikeville, Tennessee
- Coordinates: 35°44′44″N 85°10′42″W
- Area: 3 acres (1.2 ha)
- Built: 1928
- Architectural style: school plan book
- NRHP reference No.: 99000279
- Added to NRHP: March 5, 1999

The Bellview School near Pikeville, Tennessee is a rural schoolhouse built in 1928, later used as a community center. It was listed on the National Register of Historic Places in 1999.

It was built as a one-room schoolhouse but was meant to be ready for partitioning. It was split into two rooms in 1941 and was used as a school until 1964.

It is a T-shaped building upon a stuccoed brick foundation. It has a painted corrugated metal cross-gable roof and board and batten siding.
