= Tahama Spring =

Mineral spring in Colorado

Coordinates: 38°50′24.64″N 104°49′39.94″W

Tahama Spring is a mineral spring in Monument Valley Park in Colorado Springs. Named by the city's founder, General William Jackson Palmer, the spring honors Tamaha, who is mentioned by explorer Zebulon Montgomery Pike in two journal entries in 1805. When the local Parks Board commissioned a pavilion in 1926 to commemorate these early pioneers, the name “Tahama Spring” was selected and inscribed on decorative limestone-carved cartouches above each entrance.

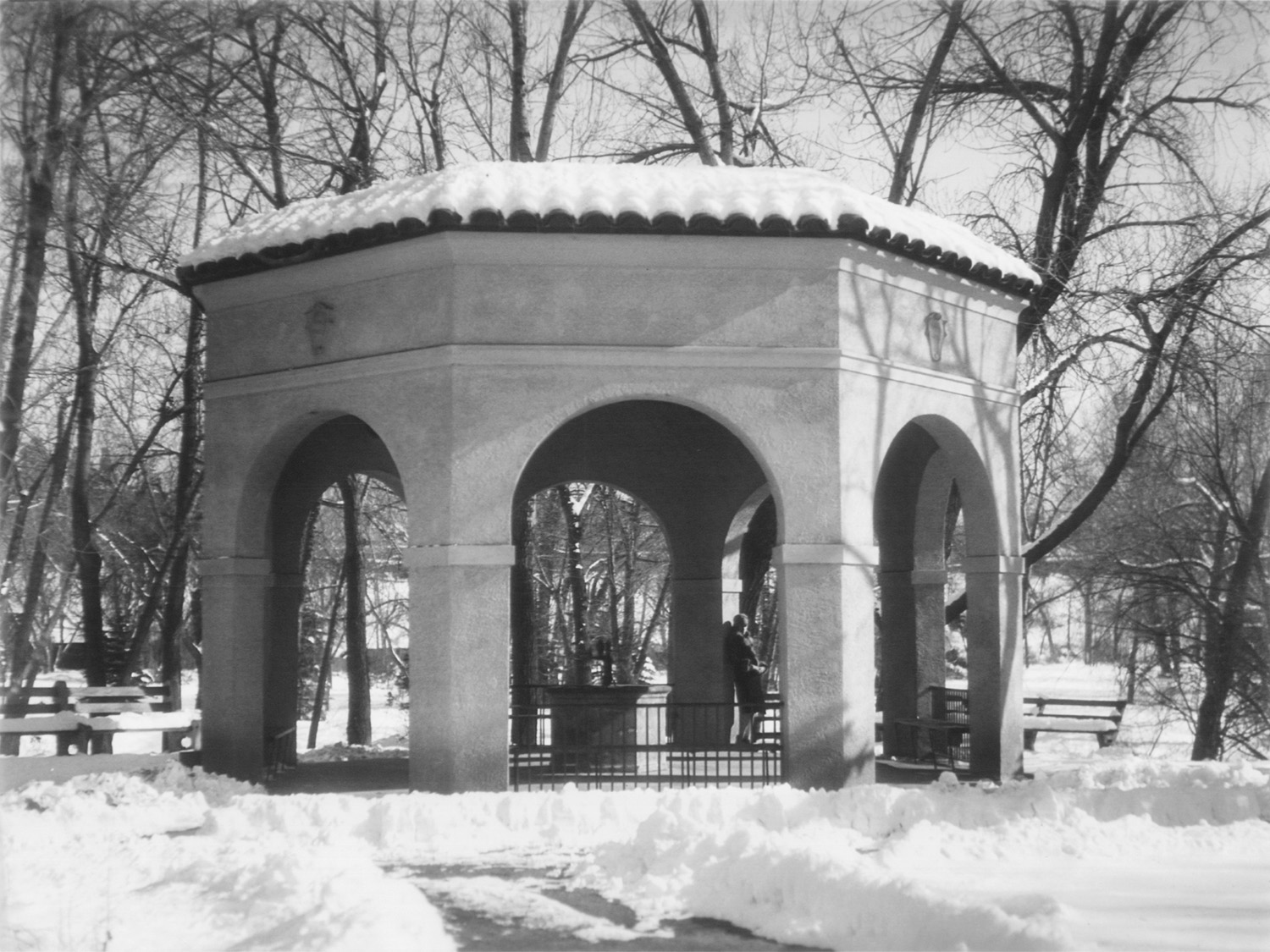
Tahama Spring pavilion designed in the Spanish Colonial Revival style by architect Elmer L. Nieman

== History ==
The Pike expedition opened the central-west and southwest region to trade and the growth of industry and settlements. In 1870, Palmer created the Denver & Rio Grande Railroad (D&RG) and envisioned connecting Denver south to a new resort community and eventually to Mexico. He founded Colorado Springs along Monument Creek, due east of Pikes Peak, where mineral springs had been reported. The local newspaper detailed how mineral water was piped to the D&RG depot in 1871, but those improvements were lost in periodic flooding along the shifting creek basin.

During excavations in 1880 to accommodate a new railroad bridge for the D&RG, Monument Creek was reconfigured in an area just north of downtown Colorado Springs. Within the newly carved creek banks, numerous chalybeate mineral springs slowly reemerged and were discovered by Dr. Charles Gatchell. Iron salts from the spring water had discolored the creek banks allowing Gatchell to trace the flow to the source.

Many enjoyed the mineral springs, and Palmer often visited the area to draw water. However, continued flooding over the next few years buried the springs with sands, and the source of the mineral water was again lost for a time. With the area covered, it was neglected and became unsightly and littered with bottles and tin cans by vagrants.

Intending to memorialize the community's original spring and to beautify the surrounding grounds, Palmer envisioned Monument Valley Park, a world-class public green similar to those he had seen in England. In 1904, he tasked chief engineer Edmond C. Van Diest to create a “charming and picturesque” network of gardens, water features and bridges. Palmer also announced plans for a handsome structure at the mineral spring, comparable to the finely crafted springhouses in neighboring Manitou Springs.

To locate the spring, Palmer and his good friend, park enthusiast Mrs. Gilbert McClurg, visited the park's site and flagged the spring's approximate whereabouts. Palmer then directed his engineer team to begin an excavation. Once the spring was located, the water flow was traced inland about 50 feet from the creek bank and a cistern structure was built to a depth of 12 feet. A font was erected at grade with a pipe extending downward to the water flow, and a hand pump was installed to bring water to the surface.

While many referred to the spring initially as “Carlsbad Spring,” Palmer preferred naming the spring after "Tammaha," the man believed to be Zebulon Pike's Sioux Indian scout. This would commemorate Tammaha's presumed service in the expedition, which was crucial to opening the high plains and foothills for Palmer and his new community. Palmer had already honored Pike with a statue of the explorer near the main entrance of the Antlers Hotel, and he was eager to honor Tammaha as well.

The mineral spring was enjoyed by the public, and, in June 1905, Edward C. Schneider, a professor at Colorado College, published an analysis of the mineral content and proclaimed the water's purity. The source of the spring water was also documented. “Water flows from the west along a shale layer and empties into Monument Creek,” Schneider noted, and the water “is not sourced or influenced by the creek, but is pure.”

The mineral spring was a popular feature of Monument Valley Park, which was completed for public use in November 1907, but its name was undecided. As a placeholder, Palmer had simply noted “Mineral Spring” on the map of the park.

Tragically, Palmer was paralyzed in a horseback riding accident in 1906 and died in 1909. Some years later, community leaders sought ideas from the public to honor Palmer. It was then, in 1923, that McClurg proposed a memorial to Palmer, Pike and Tahama and to carry out Palmer's wishes in naming the mineral spring.

The public agreed and embraced McClurg's proposal. Soon after, the Parks Board selected “Tahama” as the name for the spring and commissioned the design of a pavilion. The structure was to be a memorial to “Tahama, the native; Lieut. Zebulon Pike, the explorer, and Gen. William J. Palmer, the founder.”

The pavilion and refurbished spring font opened in the summer of 1926. Designed in the Spanish Colonial Revival style by architect Elmer L. Nieman, the pavilion was octagonal in plan, constructed of masonry and embellished with limestone accents and terracotta roofing. Four opposing arches had iron railings with integral benches facing inward toward the font while the alternating four arches served as entrances. Bronze medallions were placed on the interior above each entrance with castings in the likenesses of Tahama, Pike, and Palmer and a fourth plaque offered a brief epitaph on each man.

A few years later a bridge was installed to link Tahama Spring directly to the downtown area allowing pedestrians easier access from the east side of the creek. Local resident and park neighbor, Helen McCaffrey, recalled in 2015 during an interview with the Historic Preservation Alliance of Colorado Springs (HPA), that she often crossed that bridge to reach the spring. She also confirmed that the pavilion was a roofed structure where she and a high school sweetheart would often visit.

=== Origins of the name ===
Zebulon Pike's "friend" Tamaha was recognized by many names including Tahama, Tahamie and Tamahaw. Pike's memoirs and the writings of Elliott Coues, Edward D. Neill, J. Fletcher Williams and Charles Eastman all confirm that these names are for the same individual: the Dakota Sioux man whom Pike believed was a "war chief" and who later inspired the name for the original spring in Colorado Springs.

In Pike's journal, he refers to Tamaha as "Le Original Leve," which was a misspelling of his French name (L'Orignal Levé or "Standing Moose, which Pike translated as "Rising Moose"). In an index to his own memoirs, Pike lists Dakota name as Tahamie.

Pike refers to "Le Original Leve" as "my friend" in his journal entry dated September 24, 1805. General Palmer presumed the two men traveled together to what is now Colorado. Tahama later chose to be called by a Dakota nickname, “Tamahay,” which means “pike,” a fish. Tahama was amused by the pun, but he was equally honored to share the name of his American friend.

While accounts differ on the dates of Tahama's birth, it appears Pike and Tahama were the same age. When the Pike expedition tried the ascent of the mountain known today as Pikes Peak, the two men would have been 27 years old. Each was regarded as a leader and a warrior, but being similar in age, they were peers, truly comrades, and likely shared stories and laughter during their challenging journey. They continued their rapport for many years and served together in the War of 1812.

== Damage ==
Regrettably, the bridge was washed away in the flood of 1935 and the spring and pavilion were moderately damaged. Hoping to prevent future catastrophes, the Works Progress Administration (WPA) made substantial modifications to the park grounds by widening the channel and increasing the height of the creek banks. WPA workers also restored the pavilion and font and the community prized Tahama Spring water for the next 30 years.

Even with the taller WPA creek banks, heavy rains and subsequent flooding in May 1965 badly damaged the memorial pavilion and font. The pavilion was later razed and the font was capped. With little more than a slab remaining, and being obscured by the elevated creek banks, Tahama Spring, the city's original spring and namesake, was nearly forgotten.

== Restoration ==
In October of 2018, more than 150 people raised their glasses with a toast to Tahama Spring and tasted the spring's delicious mineral water. This marked the first time in 53 years that anyone had done so. Collected and polished just days before, the spring water was enjoyed and celebrated by guests at the HPA annual awards gala.

This HPA event formally kicked off the full restoration of Tahama Spring, its memorial pavilion and the surrounding grounds. The reconstructed pavilion will rest above the flood plain, but will otherwise follow the original design. Tahama Spring water will flow from a limestone font and through a handcrafted pump, both replicated to match the earliest components.

Inside the restored pavilion will be wall-mounted reproductions of the original bronze medallions honoring Tahama, Pike and Palmer. Tahama and Pike are represented as young men from the expedition at age 27. Palmer, who was a railroad tycoon at the age of 32, is represented as a young industrialist.
