= John Bridgman House =

- U.S. National Register of Historic Places
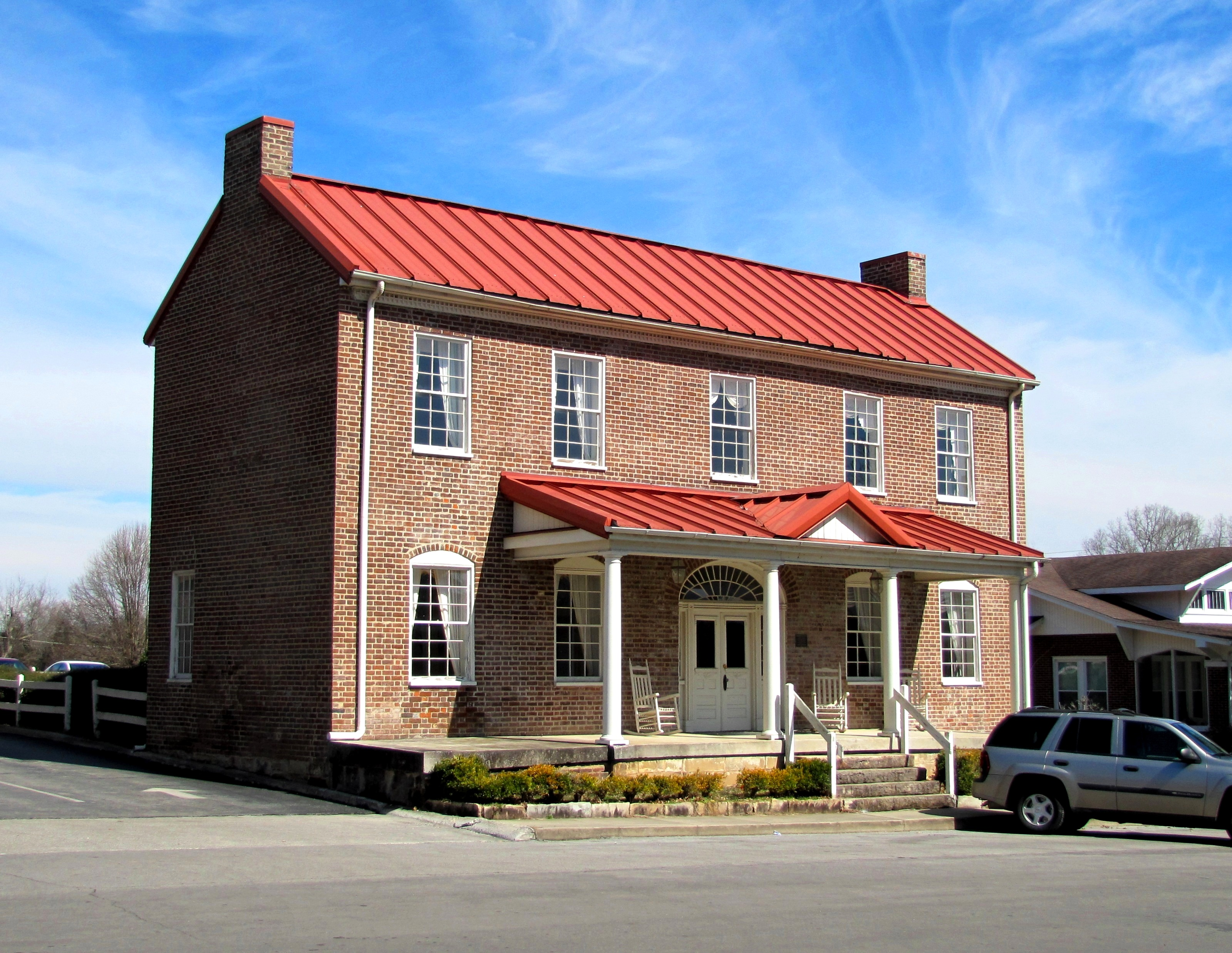
- The house in 2010

- Location within Tennessee Location within the United States
- Location: 106 East Spring Street, Pikeville, Tennessee
- Coordinates: 35°36′06″N 85°10′59″W
- Area: less than one acre
- Built: 1815
- Architectural style: Federal
- NRHP reference No.: 93000567
- Added to NRHP: June 24, 1993

The John Bridgman House is a historic house in Pikeville, Tennessee, U.S..

== History ==
The house was built circa 1815 for John Bridgman, a settler, and his wife, née Lavinia Cox. Bridgman was a co-founder of Pikeville, and he served as a member of the Tennessee House of Representatives from 1819 to 1821. He was also a landowner and a slaveholder.

In 1869, the house was purchased by the wife of Union Army General James G. Spears, Adeline. It was owned by several families until 1992, when it was acquired by the First National Bank of Pikeville.

== Architectural significance ==
The house was designed in the Federal architectural style. It has been listed on the National Register of Historic Places since June 24, 1993.
