= Pikeville, Tennessee =

- City
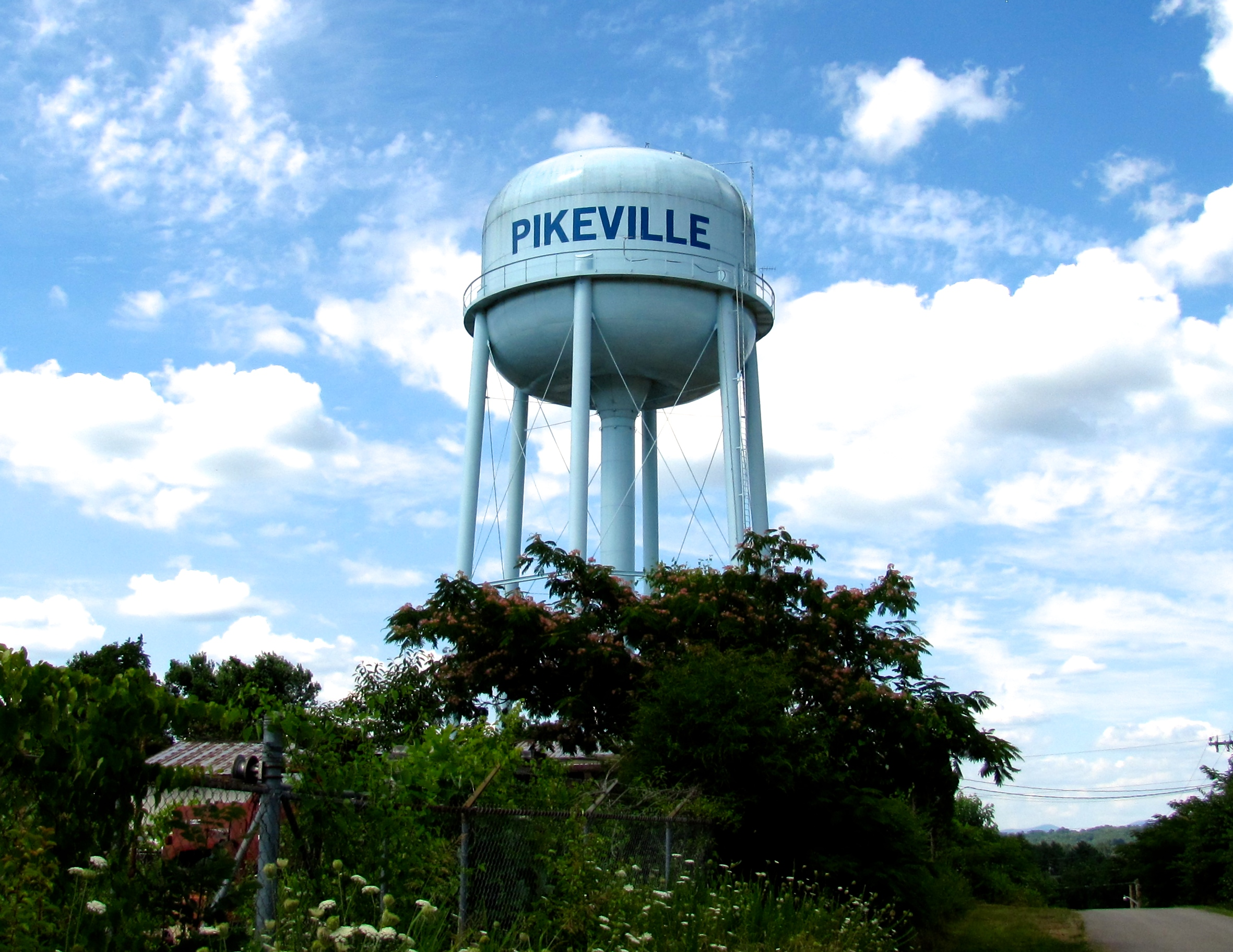
- Water tower in Pikeville
- Interactive map of Pikeville, Tennessee
- Location within Tennessee Location within the United States
- Coordinates: 35.615358°N 85.193362°W
- Country: United States
- State: Tennessee
- County: Bledsoe
- Founded: 1816
- Incorporated: 1830
- Named for: Zebulon Pike

Government
  - Mayor: Philip “Winki” Cagle
  - City Council: Betty Renick; Debra Barnett; Jeannie Decker; Bob Renick; Sherry Campbell; Jennifer Wyatt; Molly Berry; Angela McCauley

Area
  - Total: 2.442 sq mi (6.326 km^{2})
  - Land: 2.442 sq mi (6.326 km^{2})
  - Water: 0 sq mi (0.000 km^{2}) 0.0%
- Elevation: 860 ft (262 m)

Population (2020)
  - Total: 1,824
  - Estimate (2024): 1,879
  - Density: 746.8/sq mi (288.3/km^{2})
- Time zone: UTC–6 (Central (CST))
  - Summer (DST): UTC–5 (CDT)
- ZIP Codes: 37367
- Area codes: 423 and 729
- FIPS code: 47-58120
- GNIS feature ID: 2404519
- Website: pikevilletn.com

Pikeville is a city in and the county seat of Bledsoe County, Tennessee, United States. The population was 1,824 at the 2020 census, and was estimated at 1,879 in 2024.

== History ==
The Sequatchie River valley was part of Cherokee lands until 1805, when the Cherokee ceded it to the U.S. as part of the Treaty of Tellico. By the late 18th century, the valley had been identified by hunters, one of whom, Anthony Bledsoe (1739-1788), became the county's namesake. Bledsoe County was formed in 1807, with the town of Madison as its county seat.

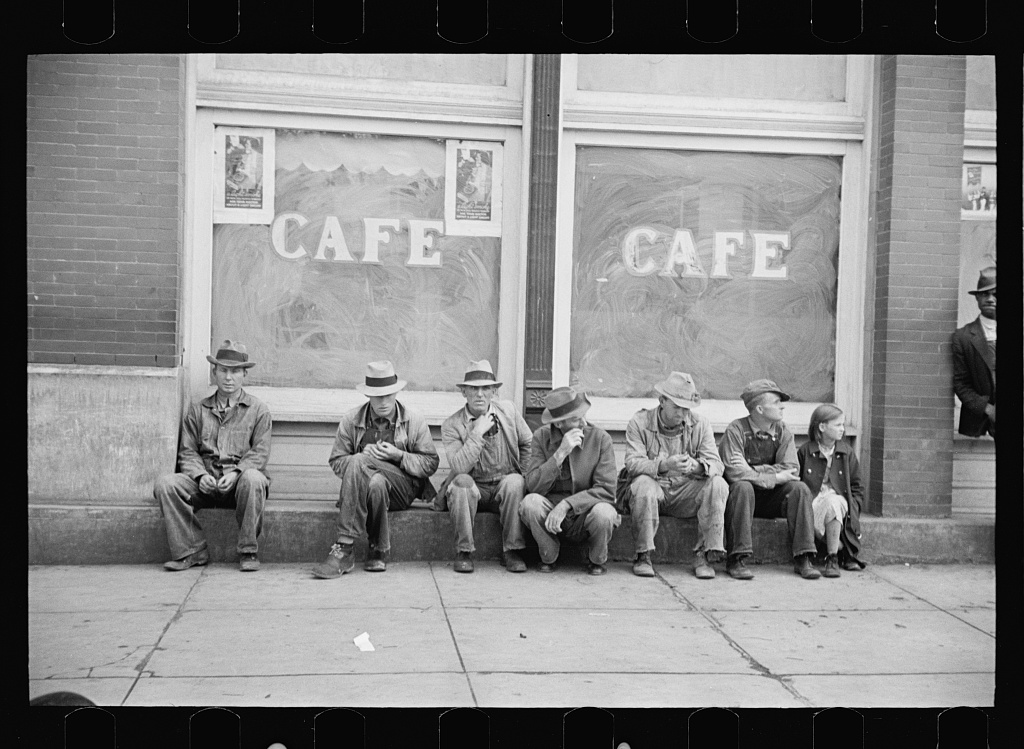
Carl Mydans photo showing local residents "spelling" themselves in front of a Pikeville store in 1936

Pikeville was established in 1816 on lands purchased from Charles Love, a land speculator from Virginia. The origin of the town's name is unknown, although some have suggested that it was named for explorer General Zebulon Pike. By 1818, the Bledsoe County seat had been moved from Madison to Pikeville. The town was incorporated in 1830.

J.V. Wigle (1890–1970), a combustion engineer from Michigan and laboratory assistant at Eastern Michigan University, met a local woman, Mattie Lawson, and settled down in Pikeville. He first brought electricity to town when he electrified the house where he lived near the corner of Poplar and Wiegle streets (Wiegle Street, named after J.V. Wigle, is misspelled). In addition to bringing electricity to Pikeville, Wigle bottled Coca-Cola and made wrought iron railings in the community. He was granted two U.S. patents in 1931 (1,798,289 & 1,814,535) for a coin selecting device and a braking mechanism. His two sons attended the engineering school at Vanderbilt University. His son Tom (1933–2006) helped build U.S. Route 127 heading north out of town as it rises up the mountain near the county line, during a summer job between semesters at Vanderbilt. Wigle is buried with his wife in Pikeville City Cemetery in the family plot, along with Tom Wigle.

== Geography ==
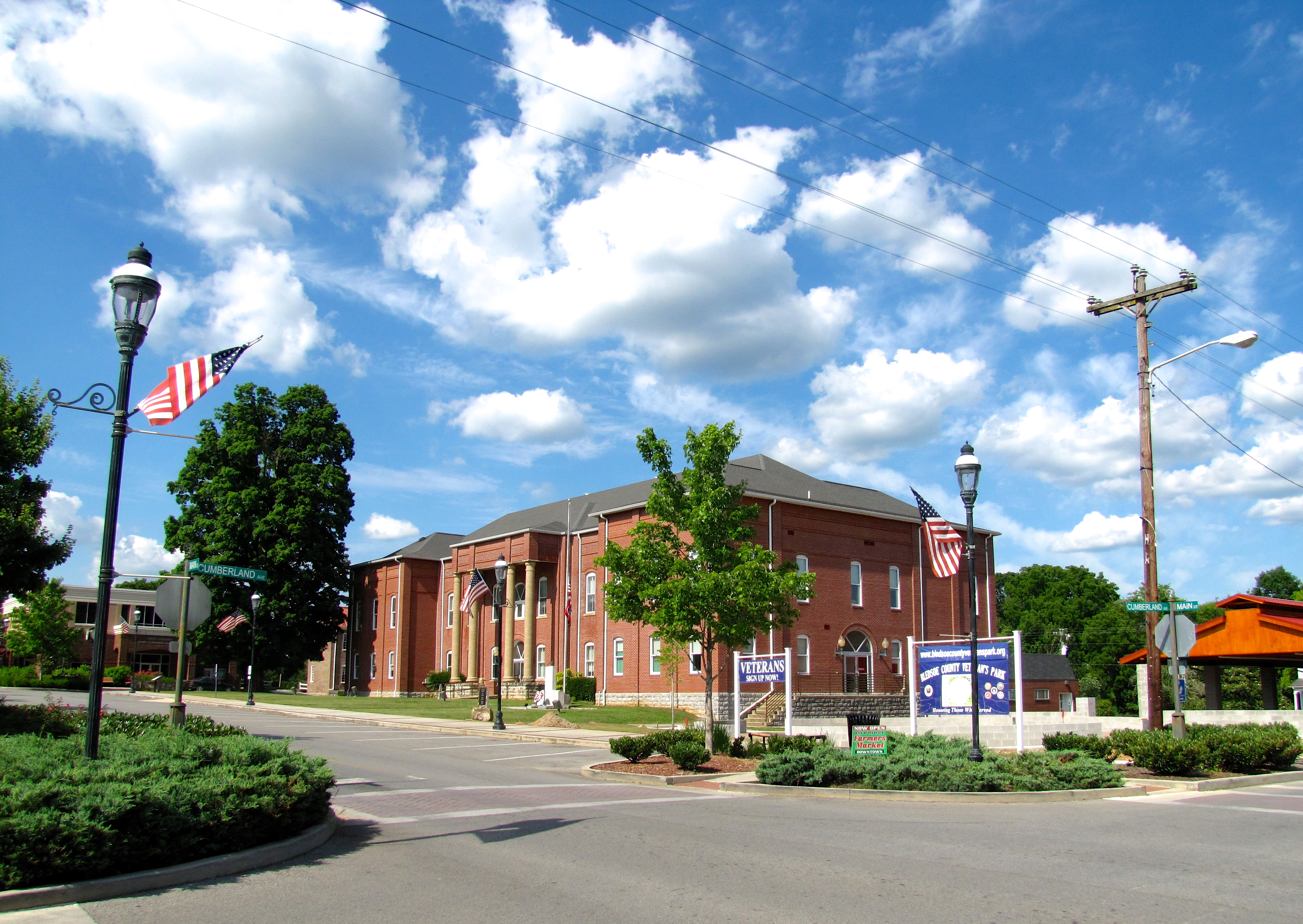
Courthouse Square in Pikeville

Pikeville is located at 35°36′20.24″N 85°11′19.86″W (35.6056232, -85.1888499). The city is situated in the northern half of the Sequatchie Valley, a deep, narrow, and fertile valley that presents as a large rupture in the southern Cumberland Plateau. The walls of the plateau, namely Walden Ridge and Little Mountain, rise prominently to the east and west, respectively. The Sequatchie River passes through the eastern section of Pikeville.

The primary highway running through Pikeville is U.S. Route 127, which connects the city to Crossville atop the plateau to the north and Dunlap to the south. In Pikeville, US-127 splits, with the main route running along Main Street through the city's business district and courthouse square, and a bypass running through a newer commercial area in the western part of the city. State Route 30, which connects Pikeville with Spencer and the Fall Creek Falls State Park area atop the plateau to the west and Dayton across the plateau to the east, runs congruent with US-127 through most of the city.

According to the United States Census Bureau, the city has an area of 2.443 square miles (6.33 km^{2}), all land.

=== Climate ===
Climate data for Pikeville, Tennessee (1991–2020 normals, extremes 1962–present)
Month	Jan	Feb	Mar	Apr	May	Jun	Jul	Aug	Sep	Oct	Nov	Dec	Year
Record high °F (°C)	75 (24)	82 (28)	87 (31)	92 (33)	97 (36)	106 (41)	107 (42)	103 (39)	98 (37)	96 (36)	85 (29)	78 (26)	107 (42)
Mean maximum °F (°C)	65.8 (18.8)	70.1 (21.2)	78.1 (25.6)	84.2 (29.0)	87.9 (31.1)	92.8 (33.8)	94.9 (34.9)	94.0 (34.4)	91.2 (32.9)	83.8 (28.8)	75.0 (23.9)	66.7 (19.3)	96.0 (35.6)
Mean daily maximum °F (°C)	49.4 (9.7)	54.1 (12.3)	62.6 (17.0)	72.2 (22.3)	79.1 (26.2)	85.4 (29.7)	88.2 (31.2)	87.8 (31.0)	82.7 (28.2)	72.8 (22.7)	60.8 (16.0)	51.7 (10.9)	70.6 (21.4)
Daily mean °F (°C)	39.8 (4.3)	43.4 (6.3)	50.8 (10.4)	59.3 (15.2)	67.1 (19.5)	74.2 (23.4)	77.6 (25.3)	76.7 (24.8)	71.0 (21.7)	60.1 (15.6)	49.1 (9.5)	42.3 (5.7)	59.3 (15.2)
Mean daily minimum °F (°C)	30.1 (−1.1)	32.8 (0.4)	39.0 (3.9)	46.5 (8.1)	55.0 (12.8)	63.0 (17.2)	67.0 (19.4)	65.6 (18.7)	59.4 (15.2)	47.5 (8.6)	37.5 (3.1)	32.8 (0.4)	48.0 (8.9)
Mean minimum °F (°C)	9.0 (−12.8)	13.4 (−10.3)	19.5 (−6.9)	28.3 (−2.1)	37.7 (3.2)	50.6 (10.3)	57.5 (14.2)	55.9 (13.3)	43.2 (6.2)	29.1 (−1.6)	19.7 (−6.8)	15.2 (−9.3)	6.2 (−14.3)
Record low °F (°C)	−20 (−29)	−11 (−24)	1 (−17)	18 (−8)	30 (−1)	37 (3)	47 (8)	48 (9)	32 (0)	21 (−6)	9 (−13)	−10 (−23)	−20 (−29)
Average precipitation inches (mm)	4.80 (122)	5.11 (130)	5.33 (135)	5.30 (135)	4.78 (121)	4.92 (125)	5.17 (131)	3.75 (95)	3.80 (97)	3.51 (89)	4.39 (112)	5.35 (136)	56.21 (1,428)
Average snowfall inches (cm)	1.1 (2.8)	1.7 (4.3)	0.8 (2.0)	0.0 (0.0)	0.0 (0.0)	0.0 (0.0)	0.0 (0.0)	0.0 (0.0)	0.0 (0.0)	0.0 (0.0)	0.0 (0.0)	0.7 (1.8)	4.3 (11)
Average precipitation days (≥ 0.01 in)	11.3	11.1	11.7	11.3	11.6	12.2	12.2	9.5	8.0	7.6	9.0	11.6	127.1
Average snowy days (≥ 0.1 in)	1.5	1.8	0.6	0.0	0.0	0.0	0.0	0.0	0.0	0.0	0.1	0.8	4.8
Source: NOAA

== Demographics ==
Historical population
Census	Pop.	Note	%±
1870	188		—
1880	145		−22.9%
1920	488		—
1930	551		12.9%
1940	759		37.7%
1950	882		16.2%
1960	951		7.8%
1970	1,454		52.9%
1980	2,085		43.4%
1990	1,771		−15.1%
2000	1,781		0.6%
2010	1,608		−9.7%
2020	1,824		13.4%
2024 (est.)	1,879		3.0%
U.S. Decennial Census; 2020 Census

=== Racial and ethnic composition ===
Pikeville, Tennessee – racial and ethnic composition Note: the US Census treats Hispanic/Latino as an ethnic category. This table excludes Latinos from the racial categories and assigns them to a separate category. Hispanics/Latinos may be of any race.
Race / ethnicity (NH = non-Hispanic)	Pop. 1990	Pop. 2000	Pop. 2010	Pop. 2020	% 1990	% 2000	% 2010	% 2020
White alone (NH)	1,682	1,680	1,484	1,657	94.97%	94.33%	92.29%	90.84%
Black or African American alone (NH)	76	55	45	40	4.29%	3.09%	2.80%	2.19%
Native American or Alaska Native alone (NH)	10	5	2	8	0.56%	0.28%	0.12%	0.44%
Asian alone (NH)	0	7	1	11	0.00%	0.39%	0.06%	0.60%
Pacific Islander alone (NH)	—	0	2	0	—	0.00%	0.12%	0.00%
Other race alone (NH)	0	1	0	0	0.00%	0.06%	0.00%	0.00%
Mixed race or multiracial (NH)	—	18	16	65	—	1.01%	1.00%	3.56%
Hispanic or Latino (any race)	3	15	58	43	0.17%	0.84%	3.61%	2.36%
Total	1,771	1,781	1,608	1,824	100.00%	100.00%	100.00%	100.00%

=== 2020 census ===
As of the 2020 census, Pikeville had a population of 1,824, with 704 households and 434 families residing in the city. The population density was 746.62 inhabitants per square mile (288.3/km^{2}).

The median age was 41.3 years; 20.8% of residents were under the age of 18 and 20.7% of residents were 65 years of age or older. For every 100 females there were 95.9 males, and for every 100 females age 18 and over there were 90.1 males age 18 and over.

Of the 704 households, 30.0% had children under the age of 18 living in them. Of all households, 33.5% were married-couple households, 19.0% were households with a male householder and no spouse or partner present, and 39.9% were households with a female householder and no spouse or partner present. About 32.0% of all households were made up of individuals and 13.2% had someone living alone who was 65 years of age or older.

There were 808 housing units at an average density of 330.74 per square mile (127.7/km^{2}), of which 12.9% were vacant; the homeowner vacancy rate was 1.0% and the rental vacancy rate was 9.4%.

0.0% of residents lived in urban areas, while 100.0% lived in rural areas.

Racial composition as of the 2020 census
Race	Number	Percent
White	1,679	92.1%
Black or African American	40	2.2%
American Indian and Alaska Native	8	0.4%
Asian	11	0.6%
Native Hawaiian and Other Pacific Islander	0	0.0%
Some other race	11	0.6%
Two or more races	75	4.1%
Hispanic or Latino (of any race)	43	2.4%

=== 2010 census ===
As of the 2010 census, there was a population of 1,608, with 665 households and 403 families residing in the city. The population density was 659.0 inhabitants per square mile (254.4/km^{2}). There were 797 housing units at an average density of 326.6 inhabitants per square mile (126.1/km^{2}). The racial makeup of the city was 93.6% White, 2.8% African American, 0.2% Native American, 0.1% Asian, 0.1% Pacific Islander, 2.0% from some other races and 1.2% from two or more races. Hispanic or Latino people of any race were 3.6% of the population.

=== 2000 census ===
As of the 2000 census, there was a population of 1,785, with 748 households and 479 families residing in the city. The population density was 734.5 inhabitants per square mile (283.6/km^{2}). There were 859 housing units at an average density of 354.3 inhabitants per square mile (136.8/km^{2}). The racial makeup of the city was 94.95% White, 3.09% African American, 0.28% Native American, 0.39% Asian, 0.28% from other races, and 1.01% from two or more races. Hispanic or Latino people of any race were 0.84% of the population.

There were 747 households out of which 29.5% had children under the age of 18 living with them, 46.1% were married couples living together, 14.7% had a female householder with no husband present, and 36.0% were non-families. 34.0% of all households were made up of individuals, and 15.1% had someone living alone who was 65 years of age or older. The average household size was 2.30 and the average family size was 2.94.

In the city, the population was spread out, with 26.3% under the age of 18, 7.0% from 18 to 24, 26.6% from 25 to 44, 22.7% from 45 to 64, and 17.4% who were 65 years of age or older. The median age was 38 years. For every 100 females, there were 87.5 males. For every 100 females age 18 and over, there were 77.8 males.

The median income for a household in the city was $23,438, and the median income for a family was $30,365. Males had a median income of $27,500 versus $19,097 for females. The per capita income for the city was $12,754. About 19.5% of families and 25.2% of the population were below the poverty line, including 29.3% of those under age 18 and 22.3% of those age 65 or over.

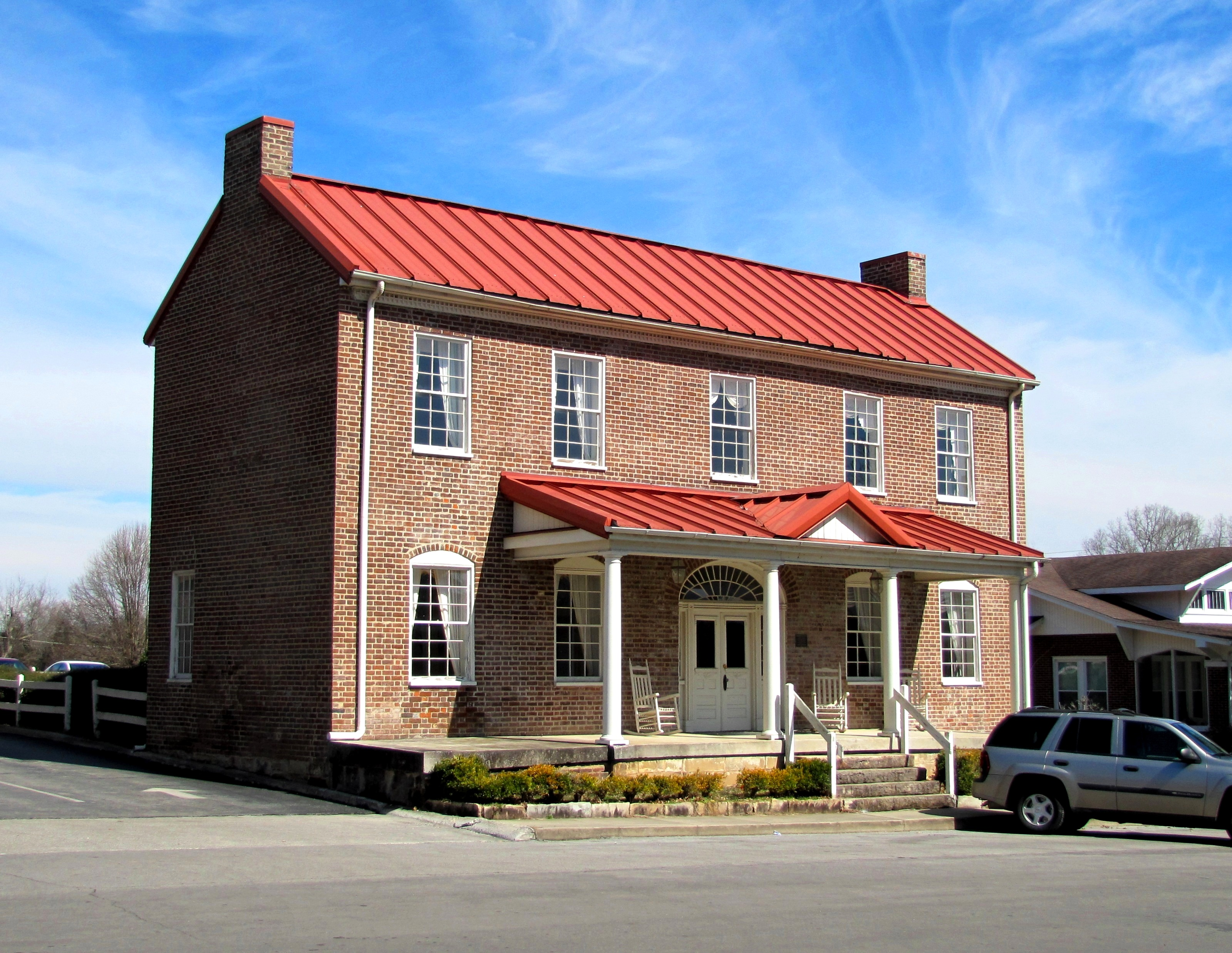
Bridgman House, built in 1815

== Historic buildings ==
- John Bridgeman House- Historical landmark in downtown Pikeville
- Bellview School- Rural schoolhouse built in 1928; now used as a community center
- Bledsoe County Court House
- Lincoln School- A Rosenwald school built in the 1920s
- Pikeville Chapel African Methodist Episcopal Zion Church- Originally a Freedmen's Bureau school built in 1870; converted to AME Zion church in 1888
- Dr. James A. Ross House- Home and office of Dr. James Ross, built c. 1872; now home to the Museum of Bledsoe County History

== Notable people ==
- Josiah M. Anderson, born near Pikeville, United States Congressman
- Ramona Barnes (1938-2003), Alaska state legislator, was born in Pikeville
- James B. Frazier, Governor of Tennessee (1903–1905) and U.S. Senator
- Theron Hale, Grand Ole Opry fiddler, born in Pikeville in 1883
- Jeanelle C. Moore, First Lady of North Carolina
- John A. Murrell (1806?-1844), bandit, known for the Mystic Clan or Mystic Confederacy, and the Murrell Insurrection Conspiracy
- James G. Spears, Civil War general
- John Boynton (American football), football player for the Miami Dolphins
