= Pike Creek Township, Morrison County, Minnesota =

Pike Creek Township, Minnesota
- Township
- Location within the state of Minnesota Pike Creek Township, Minnesota (the United States)
- Coordinates: 45°58′25″N 94°25′11″W
- Country: United States
- State: Minnesota
- County: Morrison

Area
  - Total: 33.8 sq mi (87.5 km^{2})
  - Land: 33.6 sq mi (87.0 km^{2})
  - Water: 0.15 sq mi (0.4 km^{2})
- Elevation: 1,135 ft (346 m)

Population (2000)
  - Total: 932
  - Density: 28/sq mi (10.7/km^{2})
- Time zone: UTC-6 (Central (CST))
  - Summer (DST): UTC-5 (CDT)
- ZIP code: 56345
- Area code: 320
- FIPS code: 27-50866
- GNIS feature ID: 0665296

Pike Creek Township is a township in Morrison County, Minnesota, United States. The population was 932 at the 2000 census.

Pike Creek Township was organized in 1880, and named after Pike Creek.

== Geography ==
According to the United States Census Bureau, the township has a total area of 33.8 square miles (87.5 km^{2}), of which 33.6 square miles (87.0 km^{2}) is land and 0.2 square mile (0.4 km^{2}) (0.50%) is water.

It lies to the west of the Mississippi River.

State Highways 27 and 238 are two of the main routes in the township.

== Demographics ==
As of the census of 2000, there were 932 people, 316 households, and 257 families residing in the township. The population density was 27.7 inhabitants per square mile (10.7/km^{2}). There were 323 housing units at an average density of 9.6/sq mi (3.7/km^{2}). The racial makeup of the township was 98.39% White, 0.11% African American, 0.43% Native American, 0.11% from other races, and 0.97% from two or more races. Hispanic or Latino of any race were 0.64% of the population.

There were 316 households, out of which 40.2% had children under the age of 18 living with them, 71.5% were married couples living together, 5.1% had a female householder with no husband present, and 18.4% were non-families. 15.2% of all households were made up of individuals, and 8.2% had someone living alone who was 65 years of age or older. The average household size was 2.95 and the average family size was 3.28.

In the township the population was spread out, with 30.6% under the age of 18, 6.5% from 18 to 24, 27.7% from 25 to 44, 23.4% from 45 to 64, and 11.8% who were 65 years of age or older. The median age was 37 years. For every 100 females, there were 109.4 males. For every 100 females age 18 and over, there were 110.1 males.

The median income for a household in the township was $43,882, and the median income for a family was $47,273. Males had a median income of $32,083 versus $21,905 for females. The per capita income for the township was $16,883. About 3.8% of families and 6.0% of the population were below the poverty line, including 3.1% of those under age 18 and 16.1% of those age 65 or over.
