= Dr. James A. Ross House =

Historic house in Tennessee, United States

- U.S. National Register of Historic Places
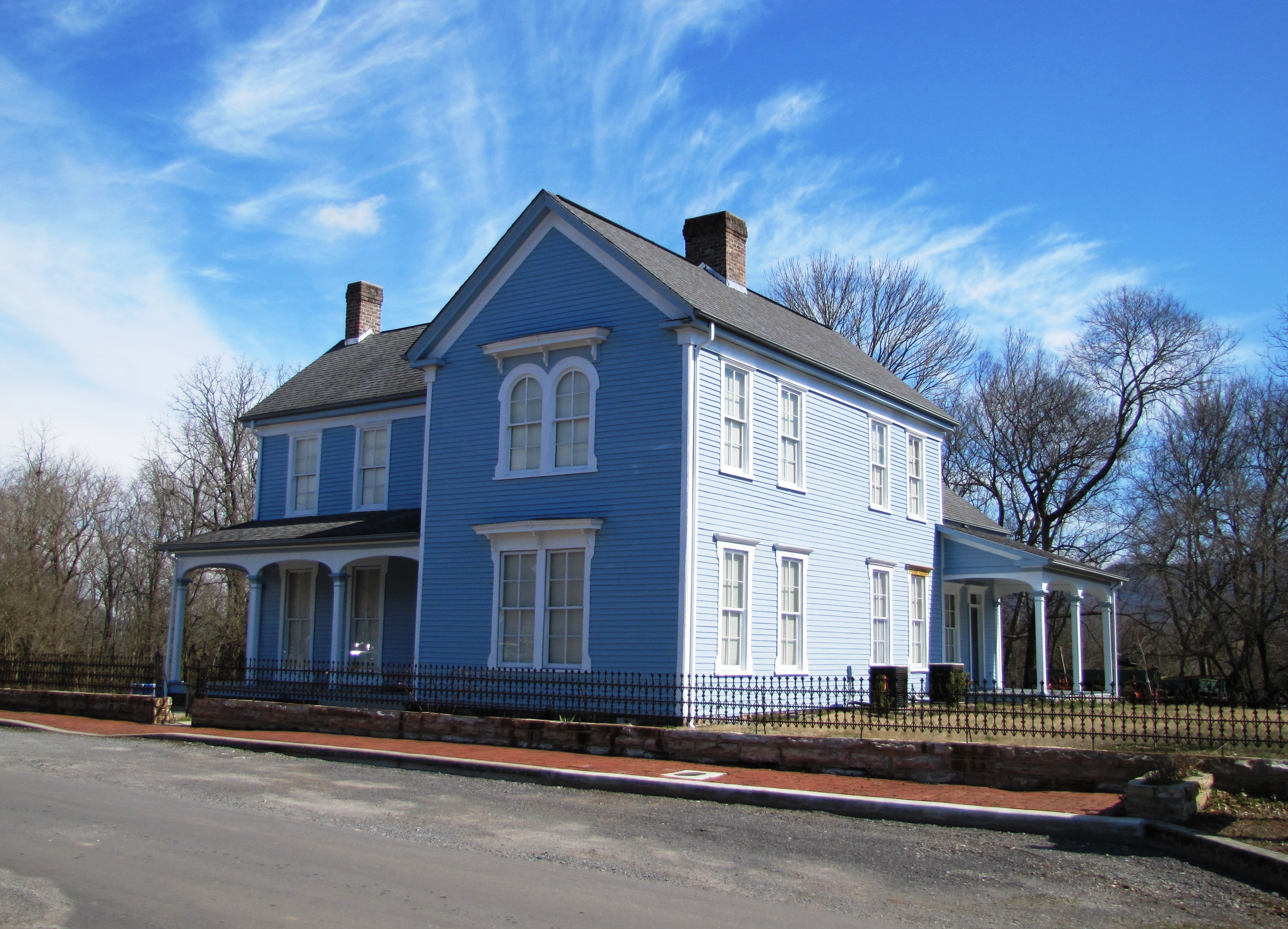
- The Dr. James A. Ross House in 2010

- Location within Tennessee Location within the United States
- Location: 102 Frazier Street, Pikeville, Tennessee
- Coordinates: 35°36′20″N 85°11′16″W
- Area: less than one acre
- Built: 1872
- Architectural style: Italianate, Folk Victorian
- NRHP reference No.: 99000758
- Added to NRHP: June 25, 1999

The Dr. James A. Ross House is a historic house in Pikeville, Tennessee, U.S.. It was built circa 1872 for Dr. James A. Ross, his wife Jennie Brown and their children. Ross was a physician who served in the Confederate States Army during the American Civil War of 1861–1865; in the Reconstruction era, he became a real estate investor. The house was purchased by Bledsoe County in 1997.

The house was designed in the Folk Victorian style, a combination of Queen Anne and Italianate architectural styles. It has been listed on the National Register of Historic Places since June 25, 1999.
