= Bledsoe County Courthouse =

- U.S. National Register of Historic Places
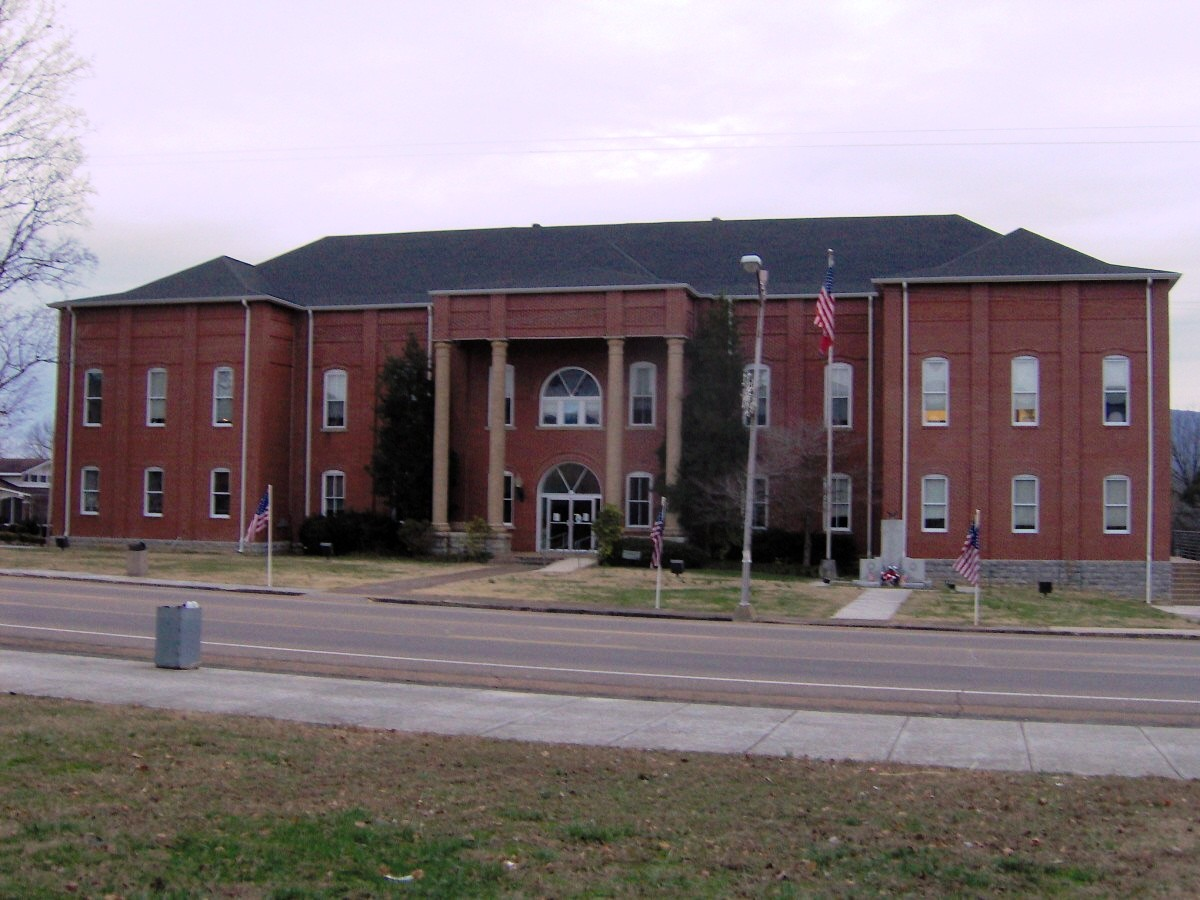

- Location within Tennessee
- Location: Town Square, Pikeville, Tennessee
- Coordinates: 35°36′20″N 85°11′19″W
- Area: less than one acre
- Built: 1909
- Architect: W.K. Brown & Brothers
- Architectural style: Classical Revival
- MPS: Historic County Courthouses of Tennessee MPS
- NRHP reference No.: 95000346
- Added to NRHP: March 30, 1995

The Bledsoe County Courthouse is a historic building in Pikeville, Tennessee. It serves as the courthouse for Bledsoe County, Tennessee. It was built with red bricks by the Fall City Construction Company of Louisville, Kentucky, and completed in 1909. In 1908, the company sued Bledsoe County because they had failed to pay $18,000 for the construction. The county argued it had not been built as requested.

The building was designed by W.K. Brown & Brothers, an architectural firm from Chattanooga, Tennessee, in the Classical Revival style. It has been listed on the National Register of Historic Places since March 30, 1995.
