= Pikeville Chapel African Methodist Episcopal Zion Church =

Historic church in Tennessee, United States

- U.S. National Register of Historic Places
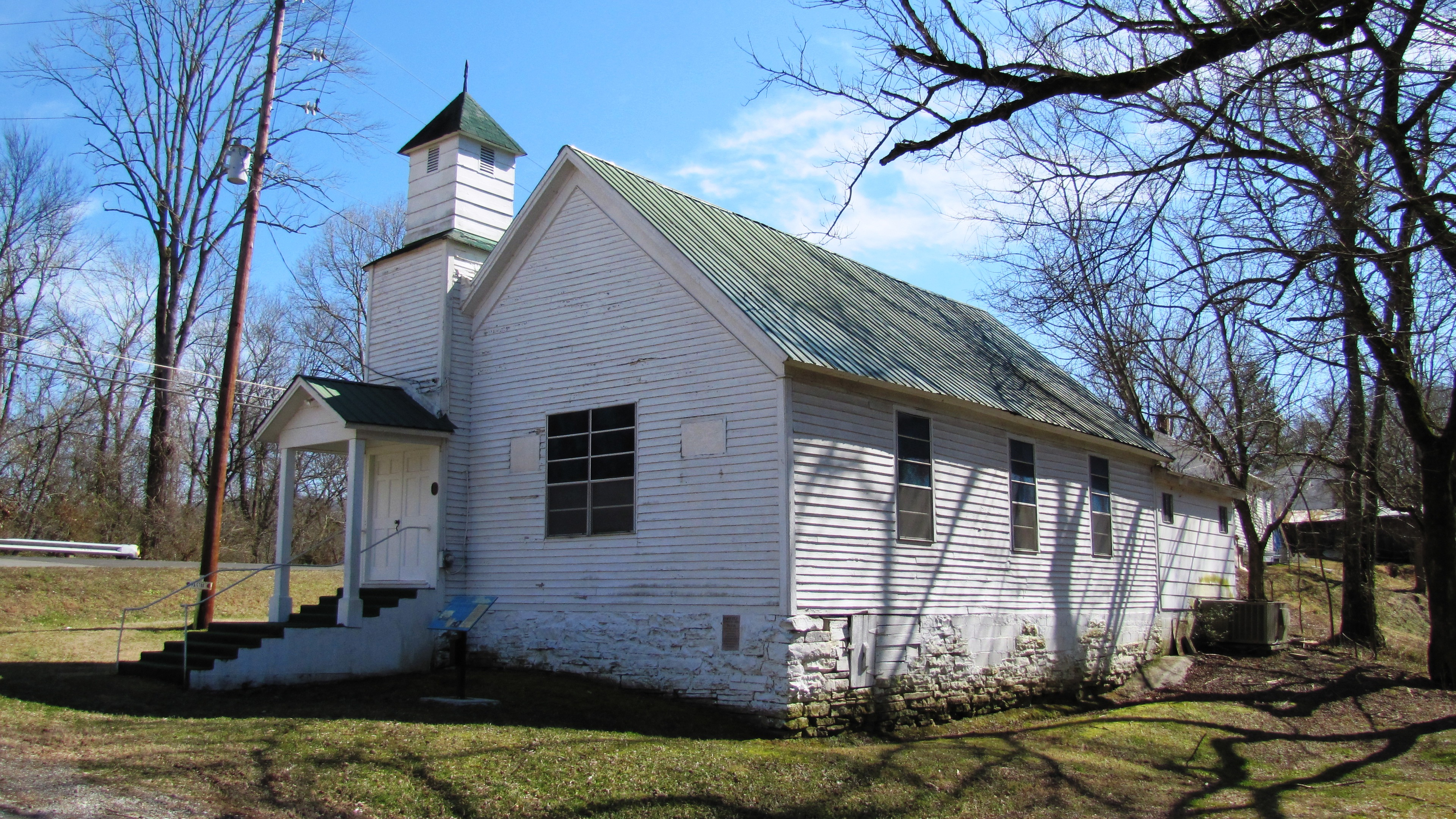

- Location within Tennessee Location within the United States
- Location: E. Valley Dr., Pikeville, Tennessee
- Coordinates: 35°36′18″N 85°11′8″W
- Area: 0.5 acres (0.20 ha)
- Built: 1870
- MPS: Rural African-American Churches in Tennessee MPS
- NRHP reference No.: 99001444
- Added to NRHP: November 30, 1999

Pikeville Chapel African Methodist Episcopal Zion Church is a historic African-American church on E. Valley Drive in Pikeville, Tennessee.

The church was built in 1870, during Reconstruction. It was used by multiple congregations and also served as the community's black school until 1925, when a Rosenwald school (Lincoln School) was built. A survey of Tennessee African-American churches conducted in the 1990s identified it as the oldest extant African-American church building in the state. The church still houses an active congregation. It was added to the National Register of Historic Places in 1999.
