= Pike Creek (Mississippi River tributary) =

Stream in Morrison County, Minnesota, U.S.

Coordinates: 45°57′11″N 94°23′29″W

Pike Creek is a stream in Morrison County, in the U.S. state of Minnesota. It is a tributary of the Mississippi River.

Pike Creek was named for Zebulon Pike (1779–1813), an American soldier and explorer.

== See also ==
- List of rivers of Minnesota
