= 110th Illinois Infantry Regiment =

110th Regiment Illinois Volunteer Infantry
- Active: September 11, 1862 - June 15, 1865
- Country: United States
- Allegiance: Union
- Branch: Infantry
- Engagements: Battle of Perryville; Battle of Stones River; Tullahoma Campaign; Battle of Chickamauga; Siege of Chattanooga; Battle of Missionary Ridge; Atlanta campaign Battle of Resaca; Siege of Atlanta; Battle of Jonesboro; Sherman's March to the Sea; Carolinas campaign Battle of Bentonville (2 companies)

The 110th Illinois Volunteer Infantry was an infantry regiment in the Union Army during the American Civil War.

== Service ==
The 110th Illinois Infantry was organized at Anna, Illinois, and mustered in for three years service on September 11, 1862, under the command of Colonel Thomas S. Casey. The regiment was recruited in Franklin, Hamilton, Jefferson, Perry, Washington, Wayne, and Williamson counties. Following its defense of the "Round Forest" (or "Hell's Half-Acre") with Hazen's Brigade in the Battle of Stones River, the regiment was consolidated into a battalion of four companies on orders dated May 7, 1863.

The regiment was attached to 19th Brigade, 4th Division, II Corps, Army of the Ohio, to November 1862. 2nd Brigade, 2nd Division, Left Wing, XIV Corps, Army of the Cumberland, to January 1863. 2nd Brigade, 2nd Division, XXI Corps, Army of the Cumberland, to May 1863. Unattached, XXI Corps to October 1863. 3rd Brigade, 2nd Division, XIV Corps, to June 1865.

The 110th Illinois Infantry mustered out of service on June 5, 1865, and was discharged at Chicago, Illinois, on June 15, 1865. Recruits to the regiment were transferred to the 60th Illinois Infantry.

== Detailed service ==
Moved to Louisville, Kentucky, September 23–25, 1862. Pursuit of Bragg into Kentucky October 1–22, 1862. Battle of Perryville, October 8. Danville October 11. Pursuit to London October 11–22. Wild Cat Mountain, near Crab Orchard and Big Rockcastle River October 15–16. Mt. Vernon October 16. Wild Cat October 17. March to Nashville, Tennessee, October 22-November 7. Duty there until December 26. Advance on Murfreesboro December 26–30. Stewart's Creek December 27. Battle of Stones River December 30–31, 1862 and January 1–3, 1863. At Murfreesboro and Readyville until June. Woodbury January 24. Expedition to Woodbury April 2–6. Regiment consolidated May 1863. Tullahoma Campaign June 24-July 7. Near Bradysville June 24. Occupation of middle Tennessee until August 16. Passage of the Cumberland Mountains and Tennessee River and Chickamauga Campaign August 16-September 22. Lee and Gordon's Mills September 11–13. Battle of Chickamauga September 19–20. Skirmishes before Chattanooga September 22–26. Siege of Chattanooga September 24-November 23. Chattanooga-Ringgold Campaign November 23–27. Orchard Knob November 23. Tunnel Hill November 24–25. Missionary Ridge November 25. Pursuit to Graysville November 26–27. March to relief of Knoxville November 28-December 18. At North Chickamauga and McAffee's Church until May 1864. Demonstration on Dalton, Georgia, February 22–27. Tunnel Hill, Buzzard's Roost Gap, and Rocky Faced Ridge February 23–25. Atlanta Campaign May 1 to September 8. Tunnel Hill May 6–7. Demonstrations on Rocky Faced Ridge May 8–11. Battle of Resaca May 14–15. Guard trains of the army until July 20. Siege of Atlanta July 22-August 25. Utoy Creek August 5–7. Flank movement on Jonesboro August 25–30. Battle of Jonesboro August 31-September 1. Lovejoy's Station September 2–6. Operations in northern Georgia and northern Alabama against Hood September 29-November 3. March to the Sea November 15-December 10. Siege of Savannah December 10–21. Carolinas Campaign January to April 1865. Averysboro, Taylor's Hole Creek, North Carolina, March 16. Battle of Bentonville March 19–21. Occupation of Goldsboro March 24. Advance on Raleigh April 10–14. Occupation of Raleigh April 14. Bennett's House April 26. Surrender of Johnston and his army. March to Washington, D.C., via Richmond, Virginia, April 29-May 19. Grand Review of the Armies May 24.

== Casualties ==
The regiment lost a total of 228 men during service; 1 officer and 13 enlisted men killed or mortally wounded, 2 officers and 212 enlisted men died of disease.

== Commanders ==
- Colonel Thomas S. Casey - mustered out May 8, 1863
- Lieutenant Colonel Ebenezer Hibbard Topping - commander of the battalion, May 8, 1863 - June 8, 1865

== See also ==
- List of Illinois Civil War units
- Illinois in the Civil War
