= Pike (surname) =

- Language: English

Origin
- Meaning: pike (fish, weapon), turnpike
- Region of origin: England

Pike is a surname of English origin.

In the United States, Pike is the 1138th most common surname (based on the 1990 census). In England and Wales, it is the 513th most common surname (based on a September 2002 database of the Office for National Statistics). In Newfoundland, Pike is especially common, ranking 22nd among all surnames there (based on the 1955 voters list, as reported by E.R. Seary in "Family Names of the Island of Newfoundland"). At the time of the British Census of 1881, its relative frequency was highest in Wiltshire (7.3 times the British average), followed by Dorset, Devon, Somerset, Berkshire, Hampshire, Nottinghamshire, Gloucestershire, the Channel Islands and Surrey.

The surname has many variations such as Pyke, Pikes, Pykes, McPike, Picke, Pique along with Speight. A volunteer-led genetic genealogy project has been identifying relationships between several family groups bearing the Pike surname and its variants since 2004.

== Derivation ==
The origins of the name are not entirely clear. Individuals may have adopted the surname based on physical attributes resembling pike (the fish), an association with pike (the weapon), or a turnpike (one of the early meanings of which was a turning pike, a horizontal timber that was mounted so as to be able to spin or turn (such turnpikes apparently served as barriers to prevent horses from accessing footpaths, and in other instances to block passage until a toll had been paid). It has also been speculated that the name Pike might be derived in some instances from the word "peak", such as when somebody resided at the peak of a hill (note, for instance, the usage of the word "pike" in the name of Scafell Pike, England's highest mountain).

== Notable people with the surname ==
- Albert Pike (1809–1891), American attorney, soldier, writer, and Confederate general
- Alex Pike (born 1997), English football player
- Alf Pike (1917–2009), Canadian professional ice hockey player
- Andrew Pike, Australian film historian
- Arthur Pike (1862–1907), English cricketer
- Austin F. Pike (1819–1886), United States senator
- Benjamin Pike Jr. (1809–1864), American businessman and manufacturer
- Bob Pike (surfer) (1940–1999), Australian surfer
- Bronwyn Pike (born 1956), Australian politician
- Burton Pike (1930–2022), professor of Comparative Literature
- Cassia Pike (born 2000), Welsh professional football player
- Christa Pike (born 1976), American murderer and the youngest woman to be sentenced to death in the USA during the post-Furman period
- Dave Pike (1938–2015), American jazz musician
- Dick Pike (1924–2003), American disc jockey
- Doris Pike (1896–1987), American investment banker and civic leader
- Drummond Pike (born 1948), American philanthropist and progressive political activist
- Eleanor Pike (1855–1933), English activist and writer
- Eleanor Franklin Pike (1890-c. 1973), English composer
- Emory Jenison Pike (1876–1918), American military officer
- Ernest Pike (1871–1936), English tenor
- Frederick A. Pike (1816–1886), American lawyer and politician
- George Pike (1923–2007), Australian rules footballer
- Henry Pike (born 1987), Australian politician
- Israel Pike (1853–1925), American baseball player
- Jarvis W. Pike (1795–1854), American politician
- Jay Scott Pike (1924–2015), American comic book artist and illustrator
- Jennifer Pike (born 1989), British violinist
- Jenny Pike (1922–2004), Canadian photographer and Navy servicewoman
- Jim Pike, American singer
- Jonathan Pike (born 1949), British architectural painter
- Kenneth Lee Pike (1912–2000), American linguist and anthropologist
- Lip Pike (1845–1893), American star of 19th century baseball, 4x home run champion
- Liz Pike (Born 1960), American politician, Republican, in Washington state
- Maria Louisa Pike (died 1892), American naturalist
- Mark Pike (1963–2021), American professional football player
- Mary Pike (1776–1832), Irish abductee
- Matt Pike (Born 1972) American guitarist and vocalist
- Mervyn Pike (1918–2004), British politician
- Natalie Pike (born 1983), English model, winner of the Miss British Isles Competition in 2004
- Nicholas Pike, English film and television music composer
- Nicolas Pike (1818–1905), American consul and a naturalist
- Olive Pike, the married name of Olive Snell (circa 1888–1962), painter
- Otis G. Pike (1921–2014), United States Democratic politician
- Patrice Pike (born 1970), American musician
- Paul Pike (born 1956), Canadian politician
- Philip Pike (1914–2011), Jamaican barrister and judge
- Randy Pike (1953–2014), American politician
- Richard Pike (1950–2011), British chemist, chief executive of the Royal Society of Chemistry from 2006–2011
- Rob Pike (born 1956), Canadian software engineer, worked at Bell Labs as a member of the Unix team, now works for Google
- Rosamund Pike (born 1979), British actress
- Samuel Pike (c. 1717 – 1773), English minister
- Sarah M. Pike, American religious studies professor
- Sumner Pike (1891–1976), American politician and government official
- Theodore Pike (1904–1987), Irish colonial administrator and international rugby union player
- Thomas Pike (1906–1983), marshal of the Royal Air Force
- Tot Pike (1907–1967), English professional footballer
- Victor Pike (1907–1986), Bishop of Sherborne and international rugby union player
- Wallace Pike (1899–1999), Canadian military veteran and Salvation Army officer, last surviving World War I veteran from Newfoundland
- Zebulon Pike (1779–1813), American soldier and explorer for whom Pikes Peak is named

=== Disambiguation pages ===
- Aaron Pike (disambiguation)
- Christopher Pike (disambiguation)
- Frank Pike (disambiguation)
- Geoffrey Pike (disambiguation)
- James Pike (disambiguation)
- John Pike (disambiguation)
- Luke Pike (disambiguation)
- Martin Pike (disambiguation)
- Oliver Pike (disambiguation)
- Peter Pike (disambiguation)
- Robert Pike (disambiguation)
- William Pike (disambiguation)

=== Fictional characters ===
- Pike (Buffyverse character), in the movie version of Buffy the Vampire Slayer, played by Luke Perry
- Asa Pike, in the Children of the Red King novels
- Charles Pike, a ground skills teacher on The Ark who is elected chancellor of Arkadia, in season 3 of The 100
- Ernie Pike, in Argentinian comics novel, written by Hector German Oesterheld, drawn by Hugo Pratt
- Private Frank Pike, naive young bank clerk and Home Guard private in Dad's Army and It Sticks Out Half a Mile
- Joe Pike (character), Elvis Cole's partner in a series of private-eye novels by Robert Crais
- Langdale Pike (character), a minor character in The Adventure of the Three Gables, a Sherlock Holmes story by Sir Arthur Conan Doyle
- Mallory Pike, a member of The Baby-Sitters Club in the eponymous series
- Pike Trickfoot, a gnome cleric portrayed by Ashley Johnson on the web series Critical Role.
- Harrison Pike, a character in the 2007 Medal of Honor Vanguard game
- The Pike Family (Curtis, Meredith, Iris, Preston and Cal) from Afraid
