= Pike =

Pike, Pikes or The Pike may refer to:

== Fish ==
- Walleyed pike or walleye, Sander vitreus, not actually a pike, but regionally referred to as such
  - Blue pike or blue walleye, an extinct color morph of the yellow walleye Sander vitreus
- Ctenoluciidae, the "pike characins", some species of which are commonly known as pikes
- Esox, genus of pikes
  - Northern pike, common northern hemisphere pike
- Mackerel pike or Pacific saury, a fish popular in east Asian cuisine

== Places ==
=== Russia ===
- Shchukino District (Russian for "Pike" District), an area in North-Western Administrative Okrug, part of the federal city of Moscow.

=== Canada ===
- Pike Island (Nunavut)
- Pike River (Quebec)

=== United Kingdom ===
- Pikes (hill), a hill in the Lake District, England
- The Pike (Hesk Fell), one of Wainwright's outlying fells in the Lake District, England

=== United States ===
- Pike, California, a census-designated place
- Pike, Indiana, an unincorporated community
- Pikeville, Kentucky
- Pike, New Hampshire, an unincorporated community
- Pike, New York, a town
  - Pike (CDP), New York, hamlet in the town of Pike
- Pike, Texas, an unincorporated community
- Pike, West Virginia
- Pike Bay Township, Cass County, Minnesota
- Pike Island, Minnesota
- Pike National Forest, Colorado
- Pike Place Market, Seattle, Washington
- Pike Road, Alabama
- Pikes Peak, in Colorado
- The Pike, an amusement park in California
- Pike County, Alabama
- Pike County, Arkansas
- Pike County, Georgia
- Pike County, Illinois
- Pike County, Indiana
- Pike County, Kentucky
- Pike County, Mississippi
- Pike County, Missouri
- Pike County, Ohio
- Pike County, Pennsylvania

=== Multiple entities ===
- Pike County (disambiguation)
- Pike Township (disambiguation)

== Military ==
- Pike (weapon), a long thrusting pole weapon used by infantry
  - Half pike
- Pike square, a Swiss military tactic
- HMS Pike, the name of five ships of the Royal Navy
- USS Pike (SS-6), an American Plunger-class submarine
- USS Pike (SS-173), the first all-welded submarine
- Pike (munition), a Raytheon-developed guided round fired from a grenade launcher

== Sports ==
- Pike (diving), a position used in competitive diving
- Pike (gymnastics), a position in which the body is bent only in the hips
- Pike, a variant of the kick (b-boy move)
- Pike, a type of cheerleading jump

== Technology ==
- Pike (cipher), a stream cipher invented by Ross Anderson
- Pike (programming language), a programming language

== Characters ==
- Pike Trickfoot, a gnome cleric in the D&D Web Series Critical Role
- Pike (Buffyverse character), a minor character in Buffy the Vampire Slayer
- Pike, a racer character in Rimba Racer
- Langdale Pike (character), a character in The Adventure of the Three Gables, a Sherlock Holmes story by Sir Arthur Conan Doyle
- Private Frank Pike a character in British TV show Dad's Army
- Christopher Pike (Star Trek), a character in the Star Trek science fiction franchise
- Gus Pike, character in Road to Avonlea

== Other uses ==
- Pike (surname), a list of people
- Pike Expedition, an American exploration of the Great Plains and Rocky Mountains
- Pike pole, a long-handled reaching, holding, and pulling tool
- Pike potato, a variety of potato
- The Pike: Gabriele D'Annunzio, Poet, Seducer and Preacher of War, 2009 biography
- Pike or toll road, a road on which fees are collected
  - Massachusetts Turnpike, known as "The Pike"
- Pike, a colloquial name for the Pi Kappa Alpha fraternity
- WWFX, branded as "100 FM The Pike"
- Pikes, a 2013 album by Buckethead

== See also ==
- Pike Creek (disambiguation)
- Piker (disambiguation)
- Pikes Peak (disambiguation)
- Pyke (disambiguation)
