= George Pyke =

George Pyke may refer to:

- George Pyke (politician) (1775–1851), lawyer, judge and political figure in Lower Canada
- George Pyke (footballer) (1887–1960), Australian rules footballer for Fitzroy
- George Woolston Pyke (1893–1977), English footballer
- George Alexander Pyke, Lord Tilbury, a fictional character in the stories of British author P. G. Wodehouse

== See also ==
- George Pike (1923–2007), Australian rules footballer for Geelong
