= 1842 =

1842 in various calendars
- Gregorian calendar: 1842; MDCCCXLII
- Ab urbe condita: 2595
- Armenian calendar: 1291; ԹՎ ՌՄՂԱ
- Assyrian calendar: 6592
- Balinese saka calendar: 1763–1764
- Bengali calendar: 1248–1249
- Berber calendar: 2792
- British Regnal year: 5 Vict. 1 – 6 Vict. 1
- Buddhist calendar: 2386
- Burmese calendar: 1204
- Byzantine calendar: 7350–7351
- Chinese calendar: 辛丑年 (Metal Ox); 4539 or 4332 — to — 壬寅年 (Water Tiger); 4540 or 4333
- Coptic calendar: 1558–1559
- Discordian calendar: 3008
- Ethiopian calendar: 1834–1835
- Hebrew calendar: 5602–5603
- Hindu calendars
- Vikram Samvat: 1898–1899
- Shaka Samvat: 1763–1764
- Kali Yuga: 4942–4943
- Holocene calendar: 11842
- Igbo calendar: 842–843
- Iranian calendar: 1220–1221
- Islamic calendar: 1257–1258
- Japanese calendar: Tenpō 13 (天保１３年)
- Javanese calendar: 1769–1770
- Julian calendar: Gregorian minus 12 days
- Korean calendar: 4175
- Minguo calendar: 70 before ROC 民前70年
- Nanakshahi calendar: 374
- Thai solar calendar: 2384–2385
- Tibetan calendar: ལྕགས་མོ་གླང་ལོ་ (female Iron-Ox); 1968 or 1587 or 815 — to — ཆུ་ཕོ་སྟག་ལོ་ (male Water-Tiger); 1969 or 1588 or 816

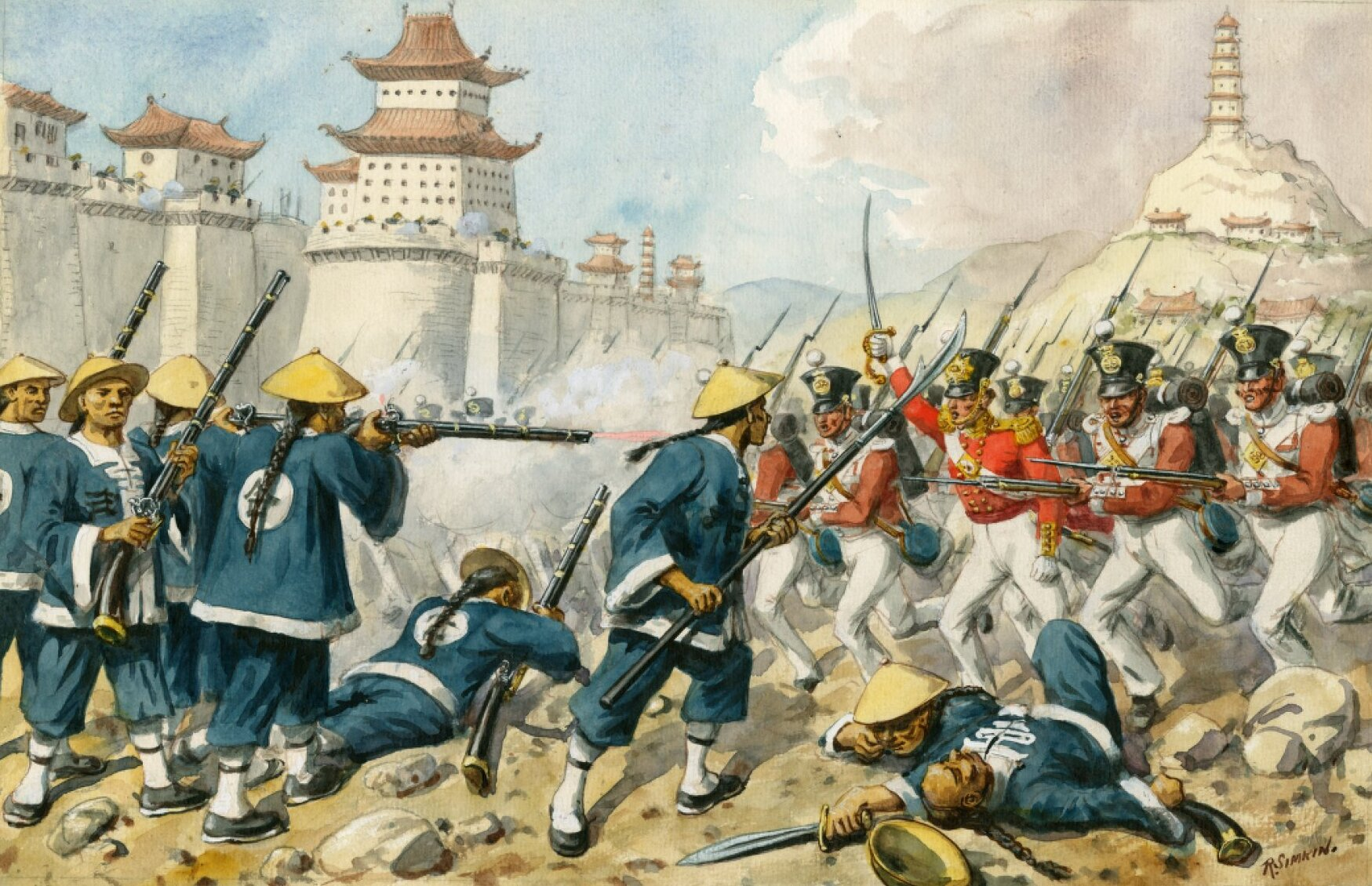
July 21: The Battle of Chinkiang is fought between British and Chinese troops.

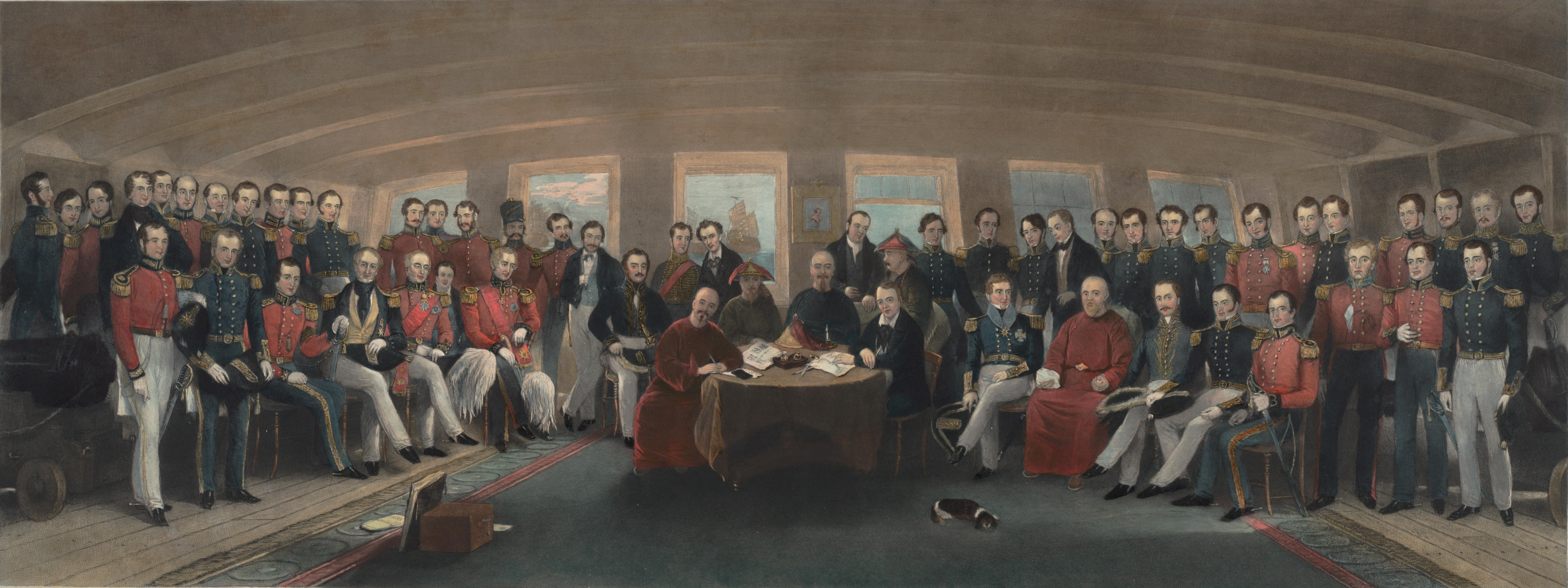
August 29: The Treaty of Nanking is signed, ending the Opium War between Britain and China.

1842 (MDCCCXLII) was a common year starting on Saturday of the Gregorian calendar and a common year starting on Thursday of the Julian calendar, the 1842nd year of the Common Era (CE) and Anno Domini (AD) designations, the 842nd year of the 2nd millennium, the 42nd year of the 19th century, and the 3rd year of the 1840s decade. As of the start of 1842, the Gregorian calendar was 12 days ahead of the Julian calendar, which remained in localized use until 1923.

== Events ==
=== January–March ===
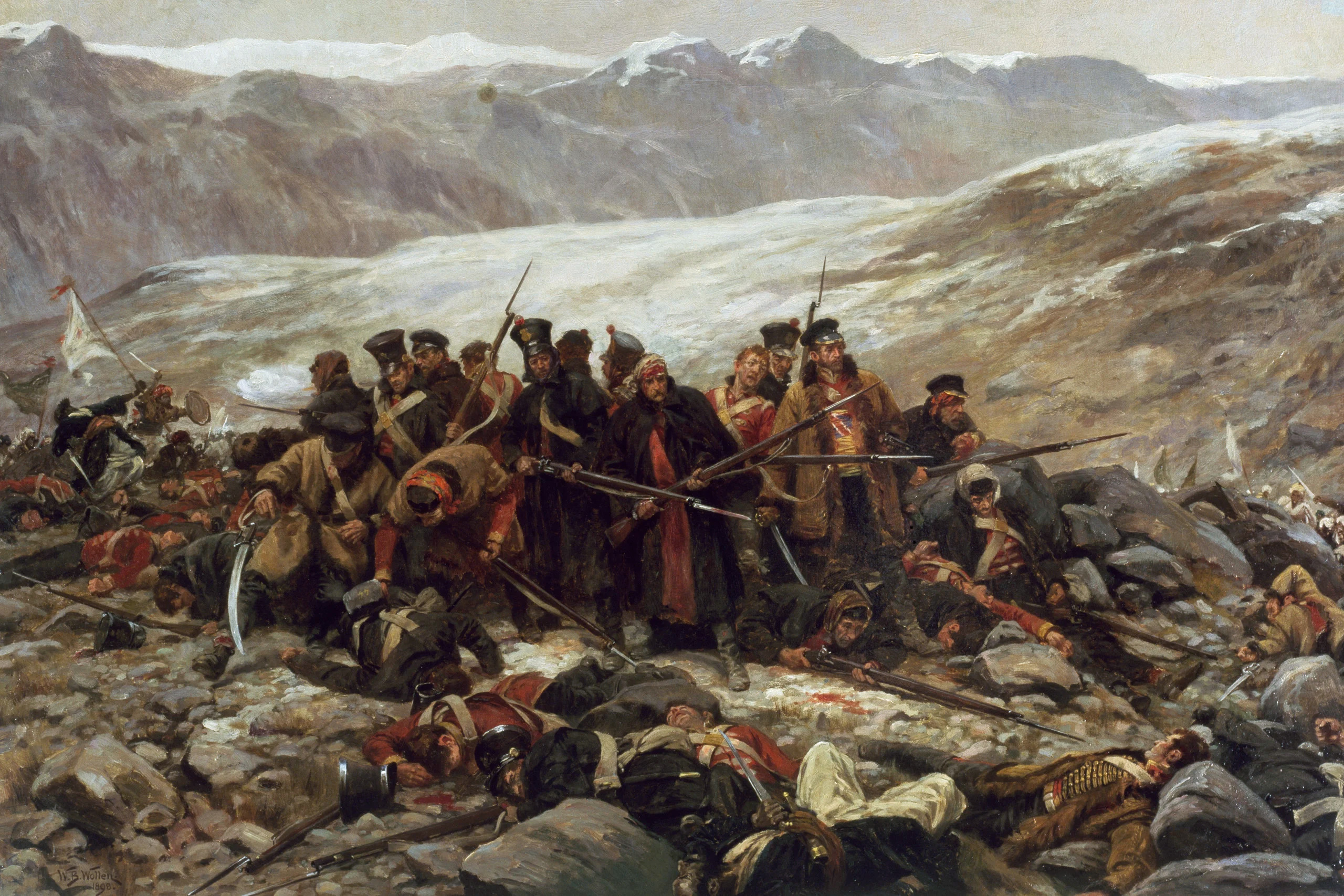
The Last Stand of the 44th Regiment at Gundamuck by William Barnes Wollen, 1898

- January 6–13 – First Anglo-Afghan War – Massacre of Elphinstone's army (Battle of Gandamak): British East India Company troops are destroyed by Afghan forces on the road from Kabul to Jalalabad, Afghanistan, by Akbar Khan, son of Dost Mohammad Khan.
- January 8 – Delft University of Technology is established by William II of the Netherlands, as a 'Royal Academy for the education of civilian engineers'.
- January 23 – Antarctic explorer James Clark Ross, charting the eastern side of James Ross Island, reaches a Farthest South of 78°09'30"S.
- January
  - Michael Alexander takes office, as the first appointee to the Anglican-German Bishopric in Jerusalem.
  - American medical student William E. Clarke of Berkshire Medical College becomes the first person to administer an inhaled anesthetic, to facilitate a surgical procedure. After Clarke uses a towel and ether to anesthetize a patient identified as "Miss Hobbie", Dr. Elijah Pope pulls her tooth.
- February 1 – The modern-day Willamette University, the oldest institution of higher learning in the western United States, is established in Salem, Oregon as "The Oregon Institute". The first students begin classes begin on August 13, 1844.
- February 7 – Battle of Debre Tabor: Ras Ali Alula, Regent of the Emperor of Ethiopia, defeats warlord Wube Haile Maryam of Semien.
- March – Commonwealth v. Hunt: The Massachusetts Supreme Court rules that labor strikes and the formation of labor unions are both legal in the United States.
- March 2 – Gaylad, ridden by Tom Olliver, wins the Grand National at Aintree Racecourse in England.
- March 5 – Mexican troops led by Ráfael Vásquez invade the Republic of Texas, briefly occupy San Antonio, and then head back to the Rio Grande. This is the first such invasion since the Texas Revolution.
- March 9 – Giuseppe Verdi's third opera Nabucco premieres at La Scala in Milan; its success establishes Verdi as one of Italy's foremost operatic composers.
- March 17 – The Female Relief Society of Nauvoo, forerunner to the philanthropic and educational women's organization of the Church of Jesus Christ of Latter-day Saints (LDS Church) is formally organized.
- March 28 – The Vienna Philharmonic Orchestra, founded by Otto Nicolai, performs its first concert.
- March 30 – American physician and pharmacist Crawford Long administers an inhaled anesthetic (diethyl ether) to facilitate a surgical procedure, performing the removal of a neck tumor.
- March 31 – The Middleton Junction and Oldham Branch Railway line is opened up to Werneth in North West England.

=== April–June ===
- April–September – 1842 general strike spreads across England's industrial districts, driven by Chartism. Includes the Preston Strike and Pottery Riots. Protestors are killed by the military in several places.
- April 13 – First Anglo-Afghan War: Battle of Jellalabad – British troops are victorious.
- May 5–8 – The Great fire of Hamburg in Germany destroys around one-third of the city centre and kills 51.
- May 8 – Versailles rail accident: A train traveling between Versailles and Paris, France derails, due to a broken locomotive axle, and catches fire, killing at least 55 passengers in the locked carriages.
- May 11 – The Income Tax Act establishes the first peacetime income tax in the United Kingdom; 7 pence in the pound, for incomes over 150 pounds.
- May 19 – Dorr Rebellion: Militiamen supporting Thomas Wilson Dorr attack the arsenal in Providence, Rhode Island, but are repulsed.
- June 4 – In South Africa, hunter Dick King rides into a British military base in Grahamstown, to warn that the Boers have besieged Durban (he had left 11 days earlier). The British army dispatches a relief force.
- June 13 – Queen Victoria becomes the first reigning British monarch to travel by train, on the Great Western Railway between Slough and London Paddington station.
- June 18 – Education in Sweden: A primary school system is established in Sweden.
- June – James Nasmyth patents the steam hammer in the United Kingdom.

=== July–September ===
- July 8 – The total solar eclipse of July 8, 1842 is visible from Asia.
- July 13 – The Tri-Kap fraternity is founded at Dartmouth College (the oldest local fraternity in the United States).
- August 4 – The Armed Occupation Act is signed, providing for the armed occupation and settlement of the unsettled part of the Peninsula of East Florida.
- August 9 – The Webster–Ashburton Treaty is signed between the United States and United Kingdom, establishing the United States–Canada border east of the Rocky Mountains.
- August 10 – The Mines and Collieries Act 1842 in the United Kingdom makes it illegal for women and girls of any age, and boys under ten years, to work underground.
- August 14 – American Indian Wars: United States general William J. Worth declares the Second Seminole War to be over.
- August 29 – The Treaty of Nanking, an unequal treaty between the United Kingdom and Qing dynasty China, ends the First Opium War, and establishes Hong Kong as a British colony (later a British dependent territory until 1997).
- September – Wesleyan University is established in Ohio.
- September 16–17 – The Treaty of Chushul ends the Dogra–Tibetan war (Sino-Sikh War).

=== October–December ===
- October 5 – Josef Groll brews the first pilsner light lager beer in the city of Pilsen, Bohemia (the modern-day Czech Republic).
- October 29 – The Iberian Peninsula is struck by a category 2 hurricane.
- November 10 & 19 – London debtor's prisons the Fleet Prison and Marshalsea are closed and inmates transferred to Queen's Bench Prison. Pentonville Prison for criminals is completed in north London this year.
- November 26 – The University of Notre Dame in Notre Dame, Indiana (United States) is established by Father Edward Sorin, of the Roman Catholic Congregation of Holy Cross.
- December 7 – The New York Philharmonic, founded by Ureli Corelli Hill, performs its first concert.
- December 20 – The Citadel, The Military College of South Carolina, is established.

=== Date unknown ===
- The Polynesian islands of Tahiti and Tahuata are declared a protectorate of France.
- The New Zealand seat of government moves from Russell to Auckland.
- Dzogchen Monastery, in Sichuan, China, is almost completely destroyed by an earthquake.
- English palaeontologist Richard Owen coins the name Dinosauria, hence the Anglicized dinosaur.
- Julius von Mayer proposes that work and heat are equivalent.
- Pickelhaube helmet introduced in the Prussian Army.
- The Sons of Temperance is founded in New York City.
- Beecham's Pills (a laxative) is first marketed in Lancashire, England, by Thomas Beecham, forming the basis of the Beecham Group and GSK plc pharmaceutical companies.
- Founding of:
  - Cumberland University (in Lebanon, Tennessee).
  - Hollins University (as Valley Union Seminary in Roanoke, Virginia by Charles Cocke).
  - Villanova University (in Villanova, Pennsylvania by the Augustinian order).
  - Indiana University Maurer School of Law at Indiana University Bloomington.

== Births ==
=== January–June ===
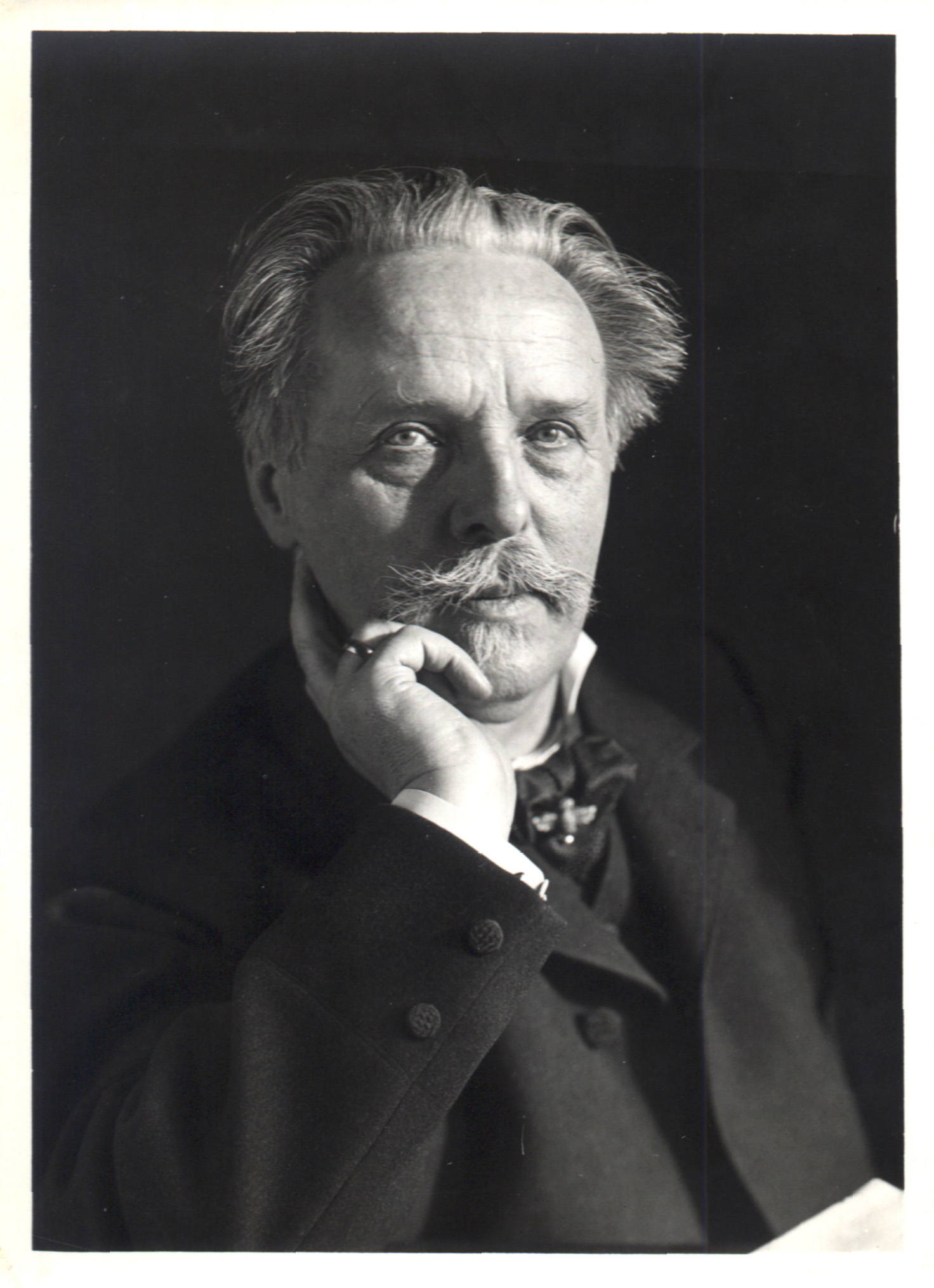
Karl May

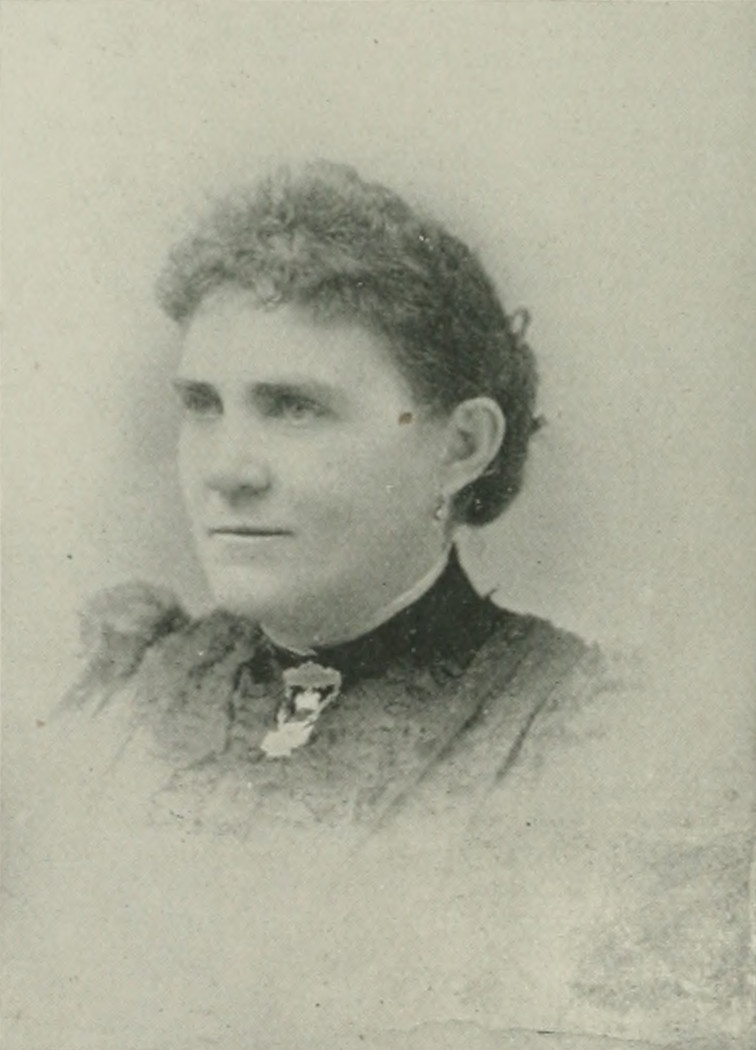
Susan Augusta Pike Sanders

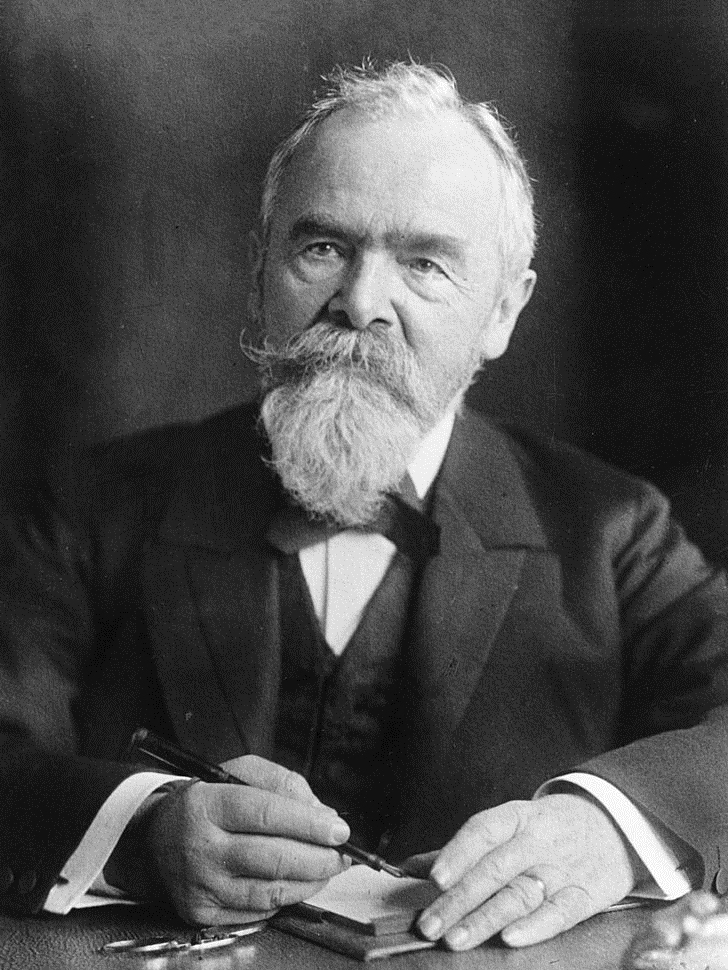
Carl von Linde

- January 11 – William James, American psychologist, philosopher (d. 1910)
- January 15 – Mary MacKillop, first Australian saint (d. 1909)
- February 3 – Sidney Lanier, American writer (d. 1881)
- February 7 – Alexandre Ribot, 46th Prime Minister of France (d. 1923)
- February 11
  - Erik Gustaf Boström, 2-Time Prime Minister of Sweden (d. 1907)
  - Maria Louise Eve, American author (d. 1900)
- February 23 – Karl Robert Eduard von Hartmann, German philosopher (d. 1906)
- February 24 – Arrigo Boito, Italian poet, composer (d. 1918)
- February 25 – Karl May, German writer (d. 1912)
- March 2 – Carl Jacobsen, Danish brewer, patron of the arts after whom the Carlsberg brewery was named (d. 1914)
- March 5 – A. Viola Neblett, American activist, suffragist, women's rights pioneer (d. 1897)
- March 10 – Mykola Lysenko, Ukrainian composer (d. 1912)
- March 18 – Stéphane Mallarmé, French poet (d. 1898)
- March 20 – María Cabrales, Cuban independence activist, revolutionary and nurse (d. 1905)
- March 25 – Susan Augusta Pike Sanders, American teacher, clubwoman, author; national president of the Woman's Relief Corps (d. 1931)
- March 26 – Alexandre Saint-Yves d'Alveydre, French occultist (d. 1909)
- March 30 – John Fiske, American philosopher (d. 1901)
- April 2 – Dominic Savio, Italian adolescent student of John Bosco (d. 1857)
- April 17 – Maurice Rouvier, Prime Minister of France (d. 1911)
- May 4 – Marietta Bones, American suffragist, social reformer, philanthropist (d. 1901)
- May 7 – Isala Van Diest, Belgian physician (d. 1916)
- May 8 – Emil Christian Hansen, Danish fermentation physiologist (d. 1909)
- May 13 – Sir Arthur Sullivan, English composer (d. 1900)
- June 11 – Carl von Linde, German scientist, engineer (d. 1934)
- June 12 – Rikard Nordraak, Norwegian composer (d. 1866)
- June 16 – David Herold, accomplice of John Wilkes Booth (d. 1865)
- June 24 – Ambrose Bierce, American writer, satirist (d. ca. 1914)
- June 25 – Eloy Alfaro, 15th President of Ecuador (d. 1912)

=== July–December ===
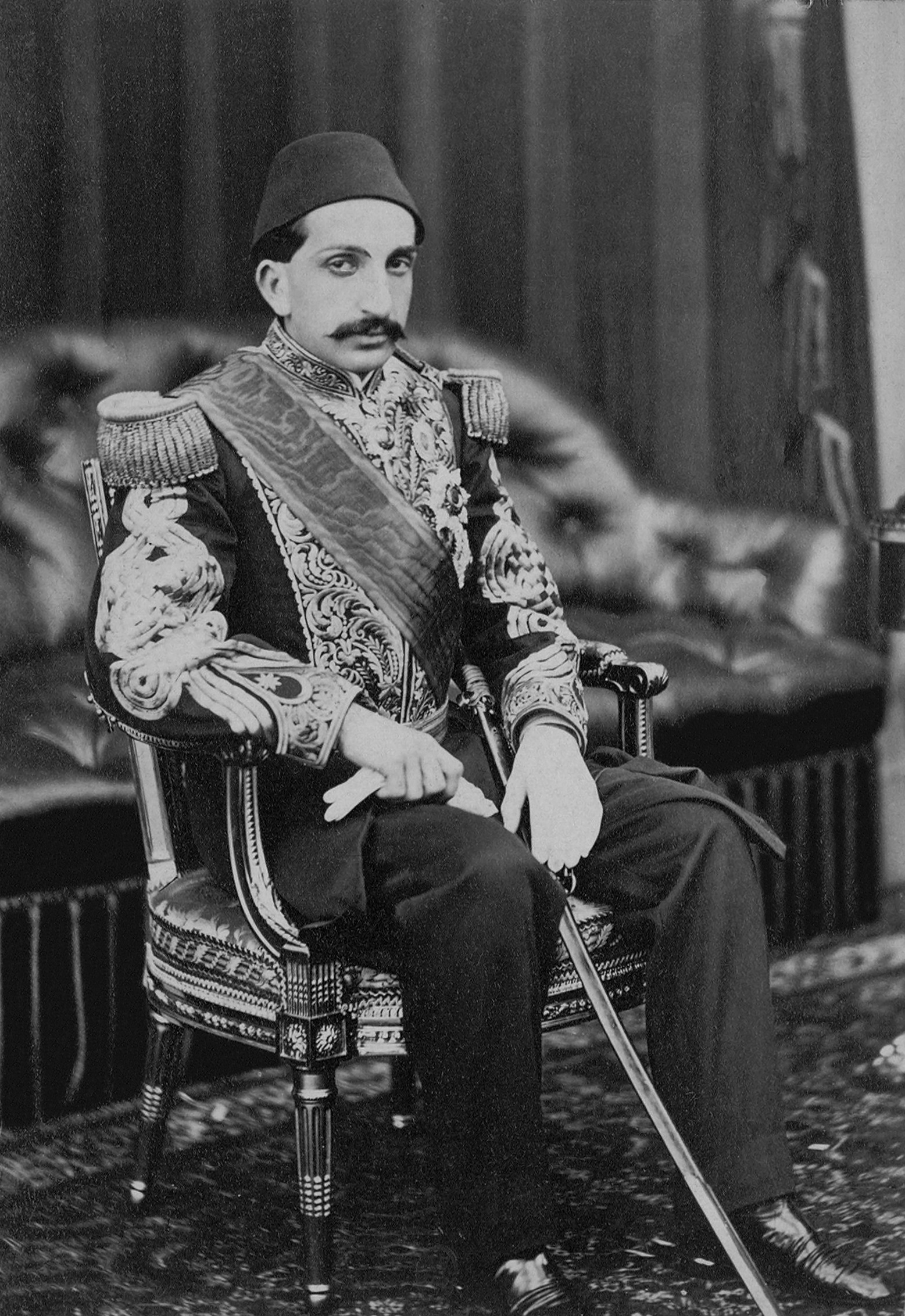
Abdul Hamid II

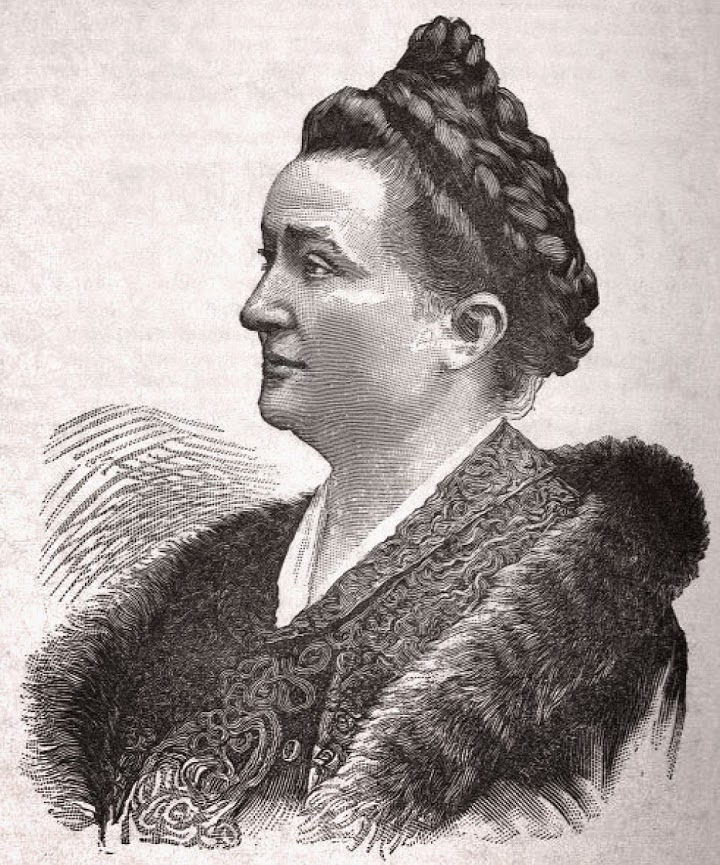
Madeleine Brès

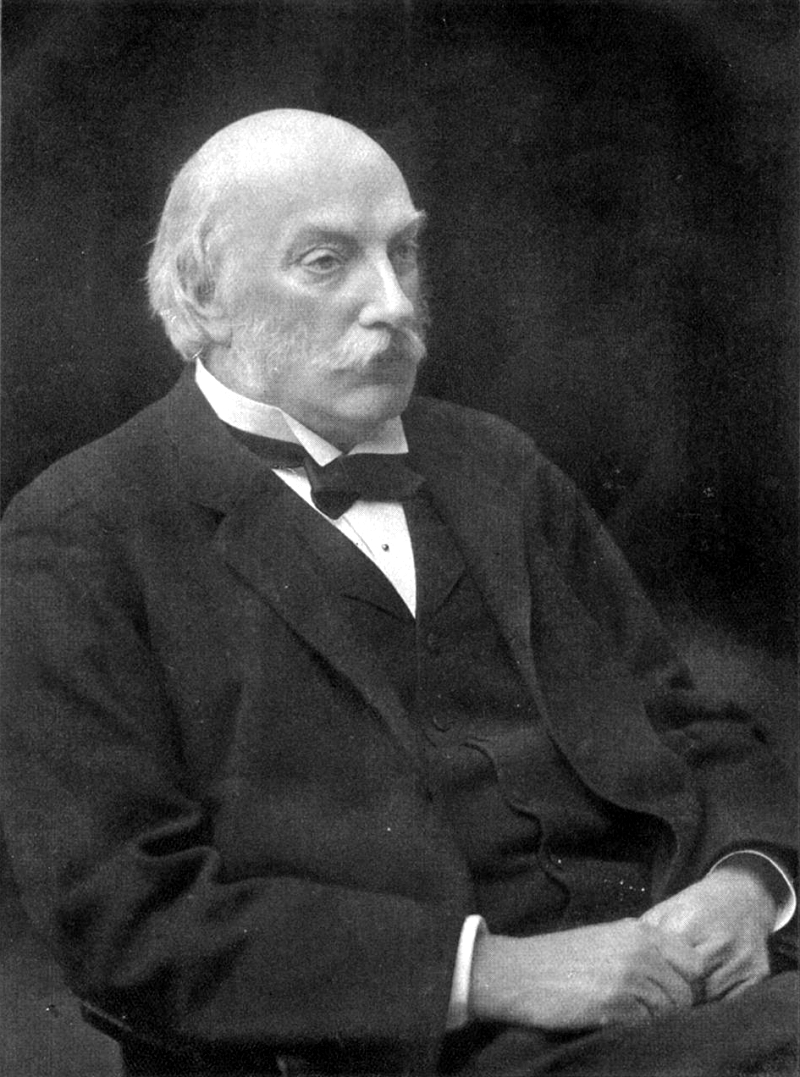
John Strutt, 3rd Baron Rayleigh

- July 2 – Albert Ladenburg, German chemist (d. 1911)
- July 4 – Hermann Cohen, German-Jewish philosopher (d. 1918)
- July 14 – Christian Lundeberg, 10th Prime Minister of Sweden (d. 1911)
- July 18 – William D. Coleman, 13th President of Liberia (d. 1908)
- July 19 – Lydia Hoyt Farmer, American author, women's rights activist (d. 1903)
- July 30 – Thomas J. O'Brien, American politician, diplomat (d. 1933)
- August 21 – Harriet Earhart Monroe, American lecturer, educator, writer, producer (d. 1927)
- August 23 – Osborne Reynolds, Irish engineer, physicist (d. 1912)
- September 3 – John Devoy, Irish rebel leader, exile (d. 1928)
- September 10 – Henry Granger Piffard (d. 1910), New York dermatologist and author of the first systematic treatise on dermatology in America
- September 13 – John H. Bankhead, American senator (d. 1920)
- September 20 – Sir James Dewar, Scottish chemist, physicist (d. 1923)
- September 22 – Abdul Hamid II, Ottoman Sultan (d. 1918)
- September 29 – Sir Joseph Palmer Abbott, Australian politician and solicitor (d. 1901)
- October 3 – Frederick Rodgers, American admiral (d. 1917)
- October 14 – Joe Start, American baseball player (d. 1927)
- October 17 – Gustaf Retzius, Swedish physician, anatomist (d. 1919)
- October 27 – Giovanni Giolitti, 5-time prime minister of Italy (d. 1928)
- October 28 – Anna Elizabeth Dickinson, American orator (d. 1932), younger sister of journalist Susan E. Dickinson
- November 12
  - Ōyama Iwao, Japanese field marshal, a founder of the Imperial Japanese Army (d. 1916)
  - John Strutt, 3rd Baron Rayleigh, English physicist, Nobel Prize laureate (d. 1919)
- November 26 – Madeleine Brès, French physician (d. 1921)
- December 2 – C. W. Alcock, English footballer, football official (d. 1907)
- December 3 – Ellen Swallow Richards, American chemist (d. 1911)
- December 9 – Peter Kropotkin, Russian anarchist (d. 1921)
- December 12 – Alfred Parland, Russian architect (d. 1919)

== Deaths ==
=== January–June ===
- January 12 – Johanna Stegen, German heroine (b. 1793)
- January 19 – Comte Siméon Joseph Jérôme, French jurist and politician (b. 1749)
- February 15 – Carlo Andrea Pozzo di Borgo, Corsican politician, Russian diplomat (b. 1764)
- March 4 – James Forten, African American abolitionist
- March 6 – Constanze Mozart, German-born wife of Wolfgang Amadeus Mozart (b.1762)
- March 13
  - Samuel Eells, American founder of Alpha Delta Phi fraternity (b. 1810)
  - Henry Shrapnel, English army officer, inventor (b. 1761)
- March 15 – Luigi Cherubini, Italian composer (b. 1760)
- March 23 – Stendhal, French novelist (b. 1783)
- March 30 – Louise Élisabeth Vigée Le Brun, French painter (b. 1755)
- May 8 – Jules Dumont d'Urville, French explorer (b. 1790)
- May 12 – Walenty Wańkowicz, Polish painter (b. 1799)
- June 9 – Maria Dalle Donne, Bolognese physician (b. 1778)
- June 18 – François-André Baudin, French admiral (b. 1774)

=== July–December ===
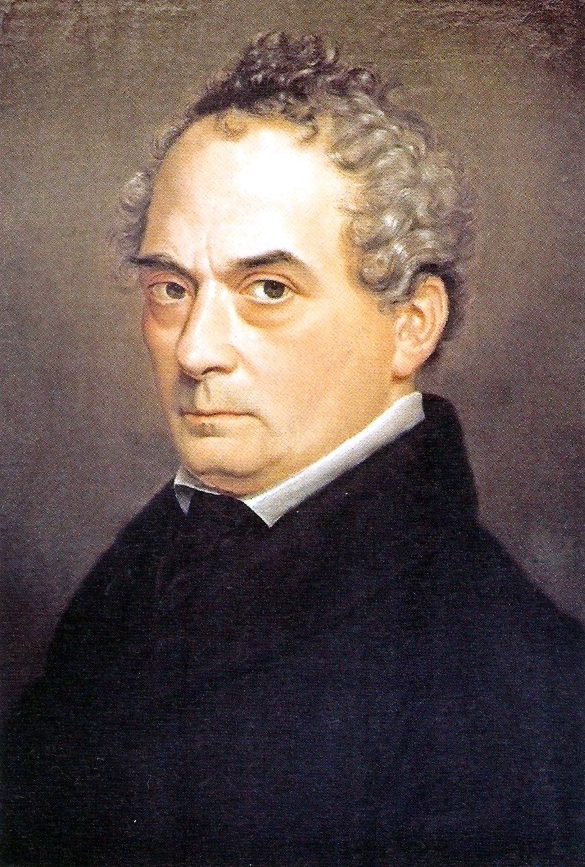
Clemens Brentano

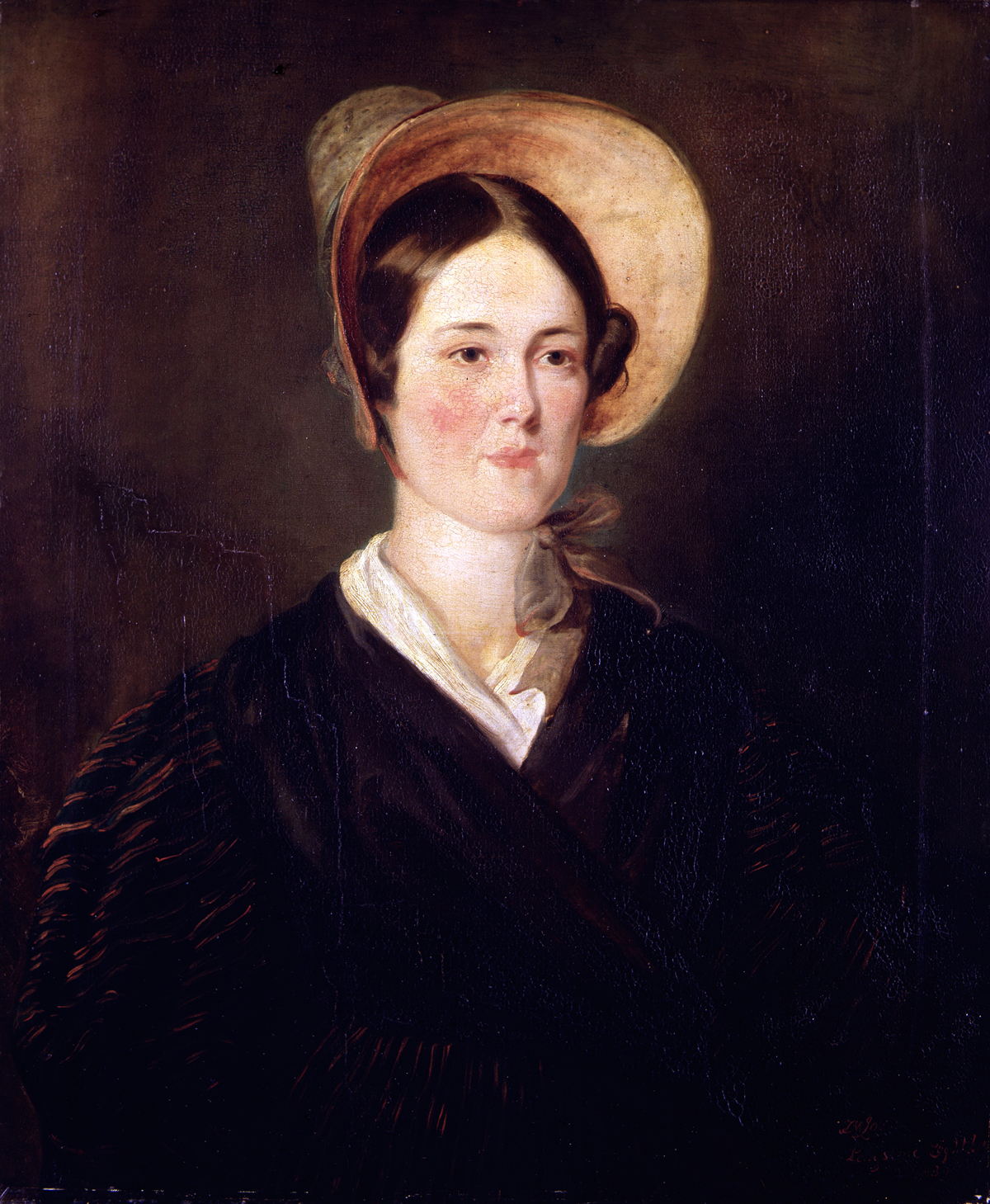
Grace Darling

- July 13 – Prince Ferdinand Philippe, Duke of Orléans, French prince (b. 1810)
- July 21 – Laura M. Hawley Thurston, American poet and educator (b. 1812)
- July 25 – Dominique Jean Larrey, French surgeon (b. 1766)
- July 28 – Clemens Brentano, German poet (b. 1778)
- August 24 – Leona Vicario, leader of Mexican War of Independence and wife of Andrés Quintana Roo (b. 1789)
- September 10
  - William Hobson, Irish-born officer in the British Royal Navy, first Governor-General of New Zealand and co-author of Treaty of Waitangi (b. 1792)
  - Letitia Christian Tyler, First Lady of the United States 1841–1842 (b. 1790)
- September 15 – Francisco Morazán, Honduran-born politician, President of Federal Republic of Central America (b. 1792)
- October 2 – William Ellery Channing, American Unitarian theologian, minister (b. 1780)
- October 20 – Grace Darling, English heroine (b. 1815)
- October 24 – Bernardo O'Higgins, first Chilean head of state after independence (b.1778)
- October 25 – Sampson Salter Blowers, American lawyer, jurist (b. 1742)
- December 1 – Philip Spencer, American founder of Chi Psi fraternity, midshipman aboard the USS Somers, hanged for mutiny.
- December 12 – Robert Haldane, British theologian (b. 1764)
- December 24 – Adam Gillies, Lord Gillies, Scottish judge (b. 1760)

=== Date unknown ===
- Nodira, Uzbek poet, stateswoman (b. 1792)
