= Robert Pike =

Robert Pike may refer to:

- Robert Pike (settler) (1616–1706), opponent to the Salem witchcraft prosecutions of 1692
- Robert Pike (bishop) (1905–1973), Bishop of Meath, 1959–1973
- Robert G. Pike (1851–1917), justice of the New Hampshire Supreme Court
- Robert L. Pike (1912–1981), pseudonym of Robert L. Fish, American writer of crime fiction
- Bob Pike (politician) (1933–1994), Australian politician
- Bob Pike (surfer) (1940–1999), Australian surfer
- Rob Pike (born 1956), Canadian software engineer and author
- Rob Pike (athlete) (born 1970), Canadian pole vaulter on the list of Canadian Track and Field Championships winners
