= Larry Bowie (guard) =

American football player (1939–2012)

No. 71, 61
- Position: Guard

Personal information
- Born: October 13, 1939; Pike, West Virginia, U.S.
- Died: December 31, 2012 (aged 73); Mahtomedi, Minnesota, U.S.
- Listed height: 6 ft 2 in (1.88 m)
- Listed weight: 245 lb (111 kg)

Career information
- High school: Ravenna (Ravenna, Ohio)
- College: Purdue
- NFL draft: 1962: 6th round, 73rd overall pick
- AFL draft: 1962: 8th round, 59th overall pick

Career history
- Minnesota Vikings (1962–1968)

Career NFL statistics
- Games played: 92
- Games started: 72
- Fumble recoveries: 2
- Stats at Pro Football Reference

Lawrence Glen Bowie (October 13, 1939 – December 31, 2012) was a National Football League (NFL) guard. He was drafted 73rd overall by the Minnesota Vikings in the sixth round of the 1962 NFL draft. He played college football at Purdue.

Bowie's 92-game career was cut short in November 1968 when he underwent emergency brain surgery to deal with a suspected blood clot. Bowie had been bothered by headaches and nausea for over a week and was admitted to Miller Hospital for observation following a Wednesday practice.
