= John Pike =

John Pike may refer to:

- John Pike (civil servant), civil servant and former State Financial Secretary of Sarawak
- John Pike, founder and director of the think tank GlobalSecurity.org
- John Pike, police officer who instigated the UC Davis pepper spray incident
- St John Pike (1909–1992), Anglican bishop
- John Pike (born 1945), British actor known for Ivanhoe (1958), Kidnapped (1959) and Live It Up! (1963)
- John Pike (footballer) (1891–1968), Australian rules footballer
- John Pike (settler) (1613 – c. 1688), founder of Woodbridge Township, New Jersey
- John Pike (sport shooter) (1861–1919), British sport shooter
- John Pike, architect of the Carib Theatre in Kingston, Jamaica

== See also ==
- John Pyke (born 1940), Australian physicist and a former university law lecturer
- John George Pyke (1744–1828), English-born merchant and political figure in Nova Scotia
