= Pyka =

Pyka is a surname. Notable people with the surname include:

- Alfred Pyka (1934–2012), German footballer
- Reemt Pyka (born 1969), German ice hockey player
- Tadeusz Pyka (1930–2009), Polish politician

== See also ==
- Pyke
