= James Pyke =

James Pyke may refer to:

- James Pyke (cricketer) (born 1966), Australian cricketer and SANFL footballer
- James Pyke (rugby union) (1866–1941), English rugby international

== See also ==
- James Pike (disambiguation)
