= Victorian Institute of Sport =

Government sporting institute in Victoria, Australia

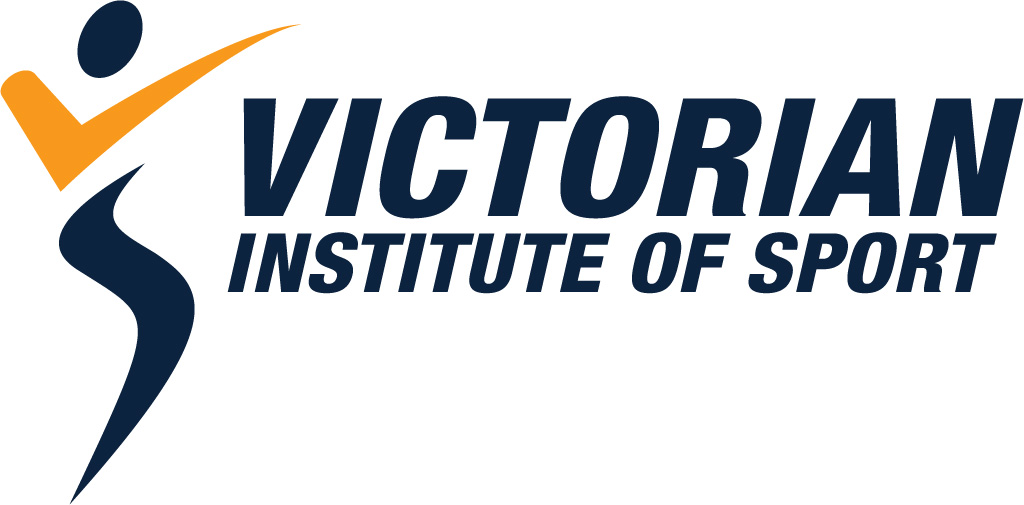
- Gold Navy Blue
- Sport: Multiple
- Abbreviation: VIS
- Founded: 1990
- Headquarters: Lakeside Stadium
- Location: Albert Park
- Chairperson: Nataly Matijevic
- CEO: Nicole Livingstone

Official website
- www.vis.org.au
- (Australia)

The Victorian Institute of Sport (VIS) is the government-funded sporting institute of the Australian state of Victoria. It provides high performance sports programs for talented athletes, enabling them to achieve national and international success. The headquarters are located in Melbourne. The organisation is a member of the National Elite Sports Council.

== Notable people ==
=== Chairs ===
- 2010–2016: Kate Palmer
- 2016–2017: Nicole Livingstone
- 2017–2025: Nataly Matijevic
- 2025–present: Dr Lauren Burns OAM

=== CEOs ===
- 1990–2006: Frank Pyke
- 2006–2024: Anne Marie Harrison
- 2024–present: Nicole Livingstone
