= Piker =

Piker may refer to type of persons like a Miser, Pikey or Vagrant.

It may also refer to:

== People ==
- Hasan Piker (born 1991), American Twitch streamer and political commentator
- Yosmani Piker (born 1987), Cuban male judoka

=== Fictional characters ===
- Miranda Piker, a character cut from Roald Dahl's book Charlie and the Chocolate Factory before publication

== Places ==
- Piker lake, a lake in McLeod County, Minnesota, U.S.

== See also ==
- Pika
- Pike (disambiguation)
- A. Piker Clerk, an American comic strip of the 1900s
- Piker's Peak, a 1957 American animated film
- Piker, vin og sang, a Norwegian sitcom
