= Mary Bradbury =

Salem witch trials defendant (1615–1700)

- Born: Mary Perkins; Hillmorton, Warwickshire, England
- Baptized: September 4, 1615
- Died: December 20, 1700 (aged 85); Salisbury, Province of Massachusetts Bay
- Known for: Salem Witch Trials convict; later exonerated while still alive
- Spouse: Thomas Bradbury
- Children: 11
- Relatives: Ray Bradbury, Bradbury Robinson, Ralph Waldo Emerson, Santana Helen Bradbury

Mary Bradbury (née Perkins; baptized September 3, 1615 – December 20, 1700) was tried, convicted and sentenced to hang as a witch in Salem, Massachusetts in 1692. However, she managed to avoid her sentence until the trials had been discredited, and died in 1700, aged 85.

== Early life ==
Mary Perkins was the daughter of John and Judith (née Gater) Perkins, and was baptized in 1615, in Warwickshire, England. Her family immigrated to America in 1631, sailing on the "Lyon" from Bristol. In 1636 she married Thomas Bradbury of Salisbury, Massachusetts, considered one of its most distinguished citizens. He was the land agent for his great-uncle Ferdinando Gorges and the son of Elizabeth Whitgift, whose uncle John Whitgift was Archbishop of Canterbury under Elizabeth and James I.

== Witch trials ==
In the notorious witch trials of 1692, Mary Bradbury was indicted for (among other charges):

Certaine Detestable arts called Witchcraft & Sorceries Wickedly Mallitiously and felloniously hath used practiced and Exercised At and in the Township of Andivor in the County of Essex aforesaid in upon & against one Timothy Swann of Andivor In the County aforesaid Husbandman – by which said Wicked Acts the said Timothy Swann upon the 26th day of July Aforesaid and divers other days & times both before and after was and is Tortured Afflicted Consumed Pined Wasted and Tormented..

Witnesses testified that she assumed animal forms; her most unusual metamorphosis was said to have been that of a blue boar. Another allegation was that she cast spells upon ships. Over a hundred of her neighbors and townspeople testified on her behalf, but to no avail, and she was found guilty of practicing magic and sentenced to be executed on September 9, 1692. Through the ongoing efforts of her friends, her execution was delayed.

After the witch debacle had passed, she was released. By some accounts she was allowed to escape. Others claim she bribed her jailer. Another account claims that her husband bribed the jailer and took her away to Maine in a horse and cart. They returned to Massachusetts after the witch hysteria had died down. Mary Bradbury died of natural causes in her own bed in 1700, aged 85.

Her family friend, and her daughter-in-law's father, Major Robert Pike, was in command of all the forces of Norfolk County, Massachusetts Bay Colony and those located in present-day Maine. As early as 1650 he was what would now be called a trial justice and in 1672 an associate judge of the courts of Norfolk Co. In political life a member of the General Court when 32 and of the Governor's Council from 1682 to 1696, when having reached the age of 50 years he retired to the private life of the farm.

== Posthumous ==
In 1711, the governor and council of Massachusetts authorized payment of £578.12s to the claimants representing twenty-three persons condemned at Salem, and the heirs of Mary Bradbury received £20. A petition to reverse the attainder of twenty-two of the thirty-one citizens convicted and condemned as a result of the trials was passed by the Massachusetts General Court in 1711. In 1957, the Commonwealth of Massachusetts reversed the stigma placed on all those not covered by earlier orders.

== Descendants ==
Mary Perkins Bradbury and Thomas Bradbury had eleven children:

1. Wymond Bradbury (1637–1669), married Sarah Pike, daughter of Major Robert Pike
2. Judith Bradbury (1638–1700), married Caleb Moody
3. Thomas Bradbury (1640–1718)
4. Mary Bradbury (1642–1724), married John Stanyan
5. Jane Bradbury (1645–1729), married Henry True
6. Jacob Bradbury (1647–1669), died in Barbados
7. William Bradbury (1649–1678), married Rebecca Wheelwright
8. Elizabeth Bradbury (1651–unknown), married Rev. John Buss
9. John Bradbury (1654–1678)
10. Anne Bradbury (1656–1659)
11. Jabez Bradbury (1658–1677)

Other Descendants

- Bradbury Robinson (1752–1801), fought for the patriots at the Battle of Concord (1775) and testified that the Redcoats fired first; a great-great-grandson.
- Bradbury Robinson (1884–1949), threw American football's first legal forward pass; a sixth great-grandson.

== Sources ==
- Threlfall, John Brooks. The Ancestry of Thomas Bradbury (1611–1695) and His Wife Mary (Perkins) Bradbury (1615–1700) of Salisbury, Massachusetts, Madison, Wisconsin: J.B. Threlfall (1988); ASIN B0006EVZOA
- Bradbury, John Merrill, Bradbury Memorial: Records of Some of the Descendants of Thomas Bradbury of Adamenticus, York, 1634 also of Salisbury, Massachusetts, 1638, 1890
