= Nicolas Pike =

American consul and naturalist

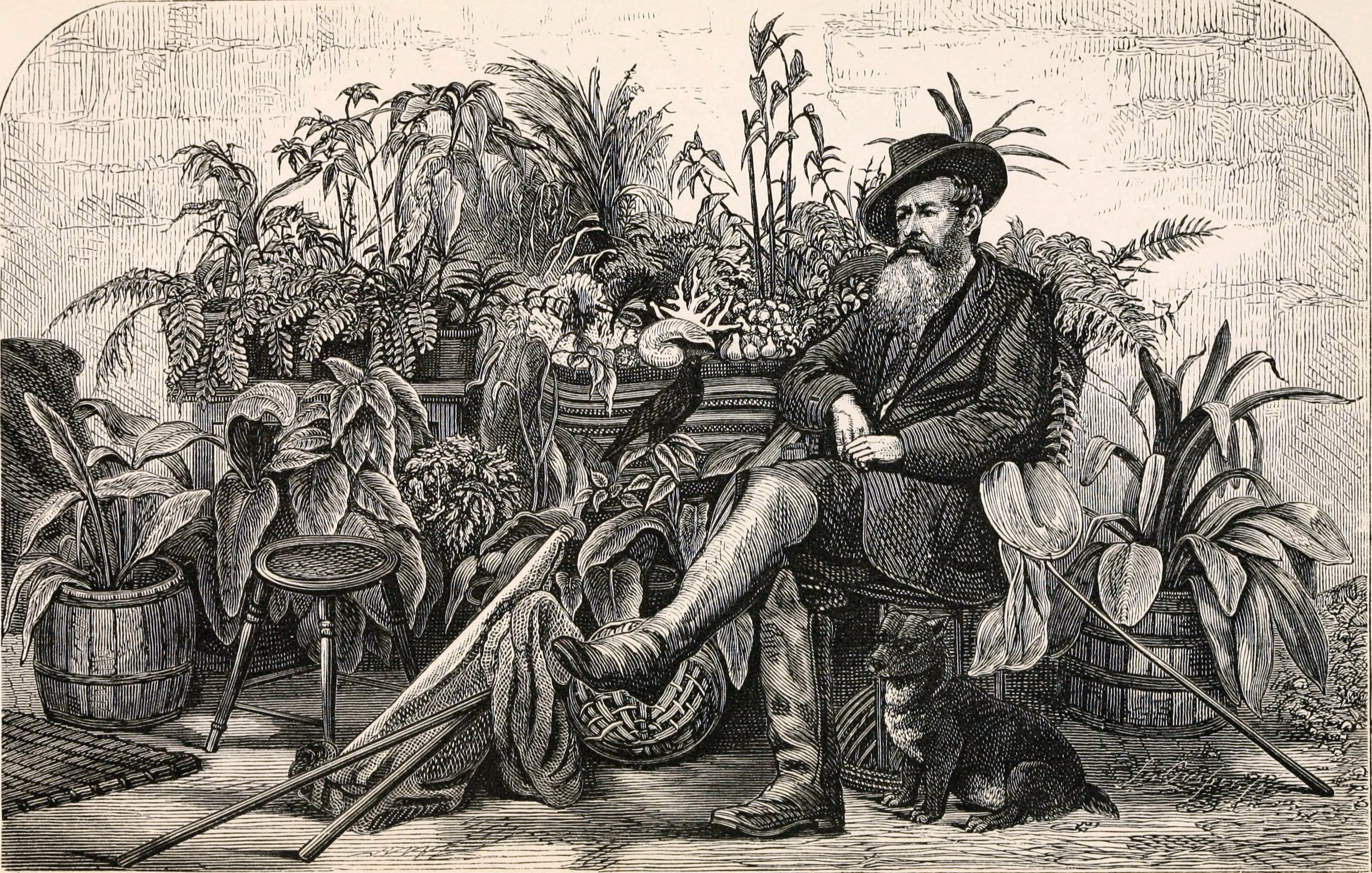
Pike and his collection, 1873

Nicolas Pike (January 26, 1818 – April 11, 1905) was an American consul and a naturalist.

Born in Newburyport, Massachusetts, he studied at Latin High School. He was named after his uncle; Nicholas Pike, a mathematician. He moved to New York in 1839 and worked as a paper hanger.

He served as consul in Oporto, Portugal. He trained soldiers in Long Island during the American Civil War and attained the rank of Lieutenant Colonel. He then served as U.S. Consul in Port Louis, Mauritius. He corresponded with the Royal Botanic Gardens, Kew. Edward Newton was the British official on the island and a bird enthusiast.

He painted fish and collected specimens that are now part of collections at the Museum of Comparative Zoology at Harvard University, the Mauritius Herbarium, and the American Museum of Natural History.

He served as president of the Brooklyn Natural History Society and as the U.S. Consul to Mauritius from 1867 to 1873. He documented fish species in the Western Indian Ocean habitat around Mauritius and neighboring islands.

He imported English sparrows and introduced them in New York.

Pomacentrus pikei, a damselfish, is named for him.

== Personal life ==
He was married to Maria Louisa Pike.

== Bibliography ==
- Sub-Tropical Rambles in the Land of the Aphanapteryx (1873)
