= Sue A. Sanders =

American teacher, clubwoman, and author

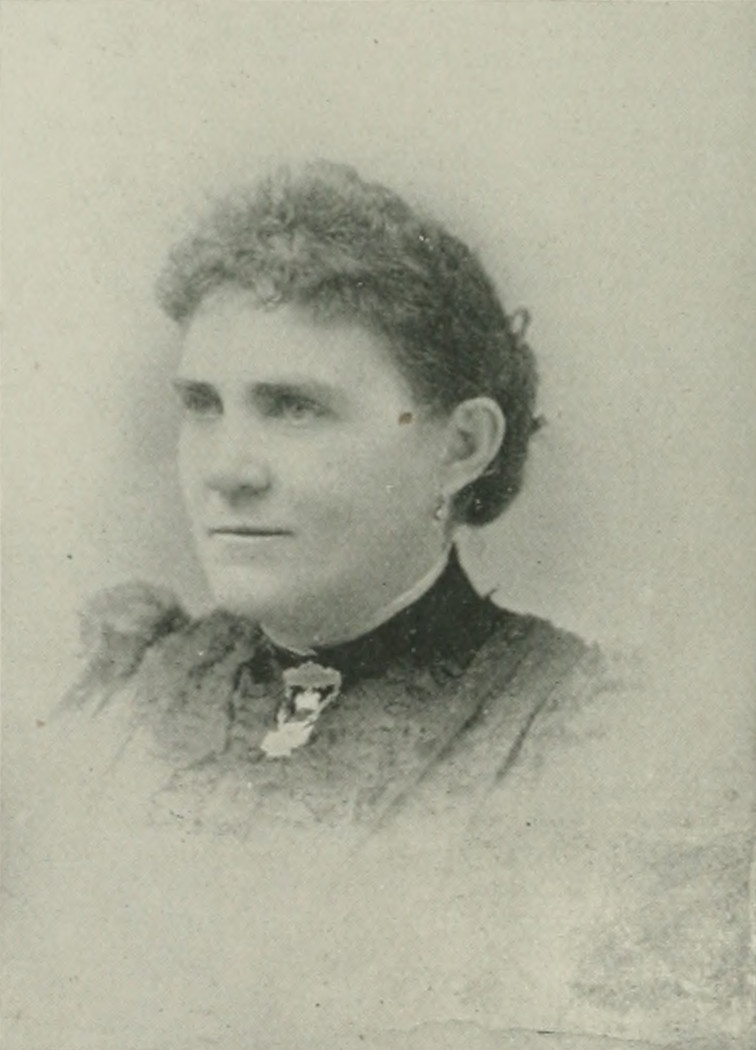
- Photo portrait from A Woman of the Century
- Born: Susan Augusta Pike; March 25, 1842; Casco, Maine, U.S.
- Died: September 8, 1931 (aged 89); Bloomington, Illinois, U.S.
- Education: Illinois State University
- Occupations: teacher; social leader; clubwoman; author
- Organizations: National President, Woman's Relief Corps
- Notable work: A journey to on and from the "golden shore"
- Spouse: James Troyless Sanders (m. 1867; died 1925)
- Relatives: John Pike

Sue A. Sanders (née, Pike; March 25, 1842 – September 8, 1931) was an American teacher, clubwoman, and author, who was prominent in social circles. She was a leader in charitable organizations serving as the ninth National President of the Woman's Relief Corps (WRC). Sanders was the originator of placing a flag in every school house, hers the first school to have a flag in McLean County, Illinois. Sanders was also the author of A journey to on and from the "golden shore" (1887).

== Early life and education ==
Susan (nickname, "Sue") Augusta Pike was born in Casco, Maine, March 25, 1842. Her parents were Harrison W. Pike (1804–1877) and Susan A. Mayberry Pike (1813–1878). Her paternal grandfather was Noah Pike, farmer of Fryeburg, Maine, and a descent of John Pike, who came from England to America in 1637 and located at Limerick, Maine. The father was born in Fryeburg, August 19, 1803, and was one of a family of 24 children. Harrison W. Pike owned and operated a farm in Casco, until he and his wife, accompanied by their seven small children, came to Bloomington, Illinois, in 1854. Here, he engaged in general merchandising and speculating and met with success. Like most men who went west in those days, Harrison accumulated wealth. In their family were seven children, all of whom were educated in Bloomington. They were: Noah H., Sue A., Ivory H., Alpheus H., Anna M. and Mary A. All of Sue's brothers were soldiers of the Civil war. The family attended the Unitarian church.

Sanders began her education in the schools of Casco, and after coming west with the family attended the Bloomington schools and the Illinois State University, of Normal, Illinois.

She became a member of the International Organisation of Good Templars (IOGT) at the age of 15, and took an active part in advancing its principles. When 18 years old, she was elected to the highest office in that order for women in her State.

== Career ==
=== Teacher ===
She taught for six years, the latter part of the time being employed in the schools of Bloomington. The most noted of her schools was the one where she taught during the Civil War in the area near her home. It was there she taught children, whose parents were what were then known as "Copperheads," sympathizers with the secessionists. Notwithstanding the sentiment that surrounded her, she kept a little Stars and Stripes hanging over her desk. One day, she returned to her schoolroom to find it broken from its staff and lying upon the floor. She gathered it up and nailed it to the wall. It hung there the rest of the term. That was the first flag-raising in a public school. Ever since that day, she advocated the placing of a U.S. flag in every school house and church in the country, and her idea became popular. She further advocated that the Bible, ballot box, and U.S. flag should accompany one another at the polls.

=== Civil War years ===
Sanders was secretary of the Soldier's Aid Society of Bloomington, during the Civil War. She also served as corresponding secretary for the U.S. Sanitary Commission branch of that city.

=== Post-war ===
On September 19, 1867, she married James Troyless Sanders (1840–1925), of Jacksonville, Illinois who was one of the incorporators of the Delavan Homestead Building & Loan Association. The couple had four children: Augusta (died in infancy in 1870) Harold Pike Sanders (1871–1957), Royal Woodson Sanders (1873–1936), and Bernadine M. (1878-1894).

After marriage, while residing in Delavan, Illinois, Sanders' time was principally occupied by home duties, but she was always more or less prominently identified with public affairs along certain lines. She was a member of the Order of the Eastern Star, having been state treasurer of the same for 12 consecutive years. She was also the grand vice templar of the IOGT (1865-67), the highest office a woman could hold in that order at that time.

In December 1885, Sanders joined the Illinois WRC, and became the first president of her Corps. In February, 1886, she represented the Corps in department convention of Illinois, where she was elected department treasurer of the order and delegate-at-large to the California convention, where she went in August, via Colorado the month before. On her return, she published a journal of her travels. In February, 1887, she was elected department president of her State. In February 1888, she was made department counselor of the Illinois WRC and a member of the national pension committee, in which she served two years. In the Milwaukee convention, she presented the recommendation for the adoption of the site of the National WRC house in Madison, Ohio. She recommended the certificate of service for the army nurses of the Civil War, and was afterward appointed by the national president to prepare a design for the same, which was adopted and issued by the national order. She was one of the board of incorporators of the National Woman's Relief Corps Home. In 1890 and 1891, she served as national instituting and installing officer. In the national convention in Detroit, Michigan, in August, 1891, she was elected national president of the WRC. In 1892, she presided over the convention held at Washington, D.C.

=== Bloomington ===
Sanders always took considerable interest in school work and everything tending toward reform, but on coming to Bloomington, November, 1892, she determined to keep out of public office. This she could not well do, as the people knew her ability as a leader and the success with which she always met in the management of public affairs. Her first public work here was in connection with the Wither's Public Library as a trustee, and in 1894 she was elected its president, which office she filled for three years, later serving as secretary of the same. Sanders became actively interested in the Girls' Industrial home of McLean county for the care of dependent and defenseless girls, serving as president for three years. In April 1898, Sander was elected a member of the Bloomington board of education.

Her husband became a well-known realtor of Bloomington. The couple attended and helped support the Unitarian church, of which she served as superintendent of the Sunday school for three years. Sanders was a prominent member of the McLean County Historical Society and prepared for the association a complete account of the work of the Sanitary Aid Society of McLean County, from 1861 to 1866. She was a member of the board of trustees of the Deaconess Hospital, a member of the Daughters of the American Revolution, and served as first vice-president of the Woman's Club.

== Death ==
James died in 1925. She died September 8, 1931, at St. Joseph's Hospital, in Bloomington, and was buried at that city's Evergreen Memorial Cemetery. She was the grandmother of Irene Delroy.

== Selected works ==
- A journey to on and from the "golden shore", 1887
