= Pyke =

Pyke is a surname, and may refer to

== Fictional characters ==
- George Alexander Pyke, Lord Tilbury, character devised by PG Wodehouse
- Pyke, The Bloodharbor Ripper from League of Legends

== Real people ==
- Don Pyke (born 1968), Australian rules footballer
- Geoffrey Pyke (1893–1948), English journalist, spy and inventor
- Helen Pyke, English pianist and composer
- Hy Pyke (1935–2006), American character actor
- Frank Pyke (1941–2011), Australian footballer, sports scientist and sports administrator
- James Pyke (cricketer) (born 1966), Australian sportsman
- James Pyke (rugby union) (1866–1941), English rugby union footballer
- Josh Pyke (born 1983), Australian singer-songwriter-musician
- Lionel Edward Pyke (1854–1899), English barrister
- Magnus Pyke (1908–1992), British scientist and media personality
- Margaret Pyke (1893–1966), campaigner for family planning
- Mike Pyke (born 1984), Canadian player of rugby and Australian rules football
- Stuart Pyke, British sports journalist and broadcaster
- Veronica Pyke (born 1981), Australian cricketer

== Other ==
- Pyke, one of the Iron Islands in the George R. R. Martin A Song of Ice and Fire series. The seat of House Greyjoy. Also the surname of noble bastards born in the islands.

== See also ==
- Pike (disambiguation)
