= Robert Pike (settler) =

English colonist (1616–1706)

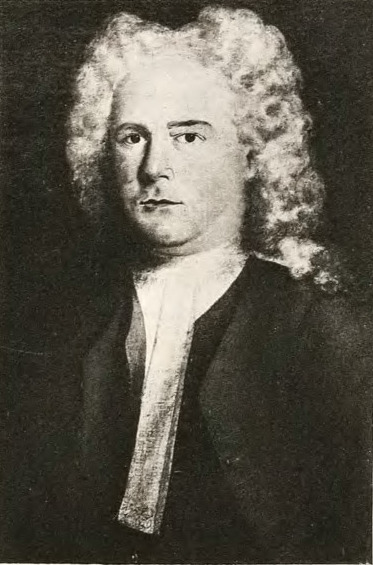
- Born: 1616; Wiltshire
- Died: 12 December 1706 (aged 89–90)
- Children: 8

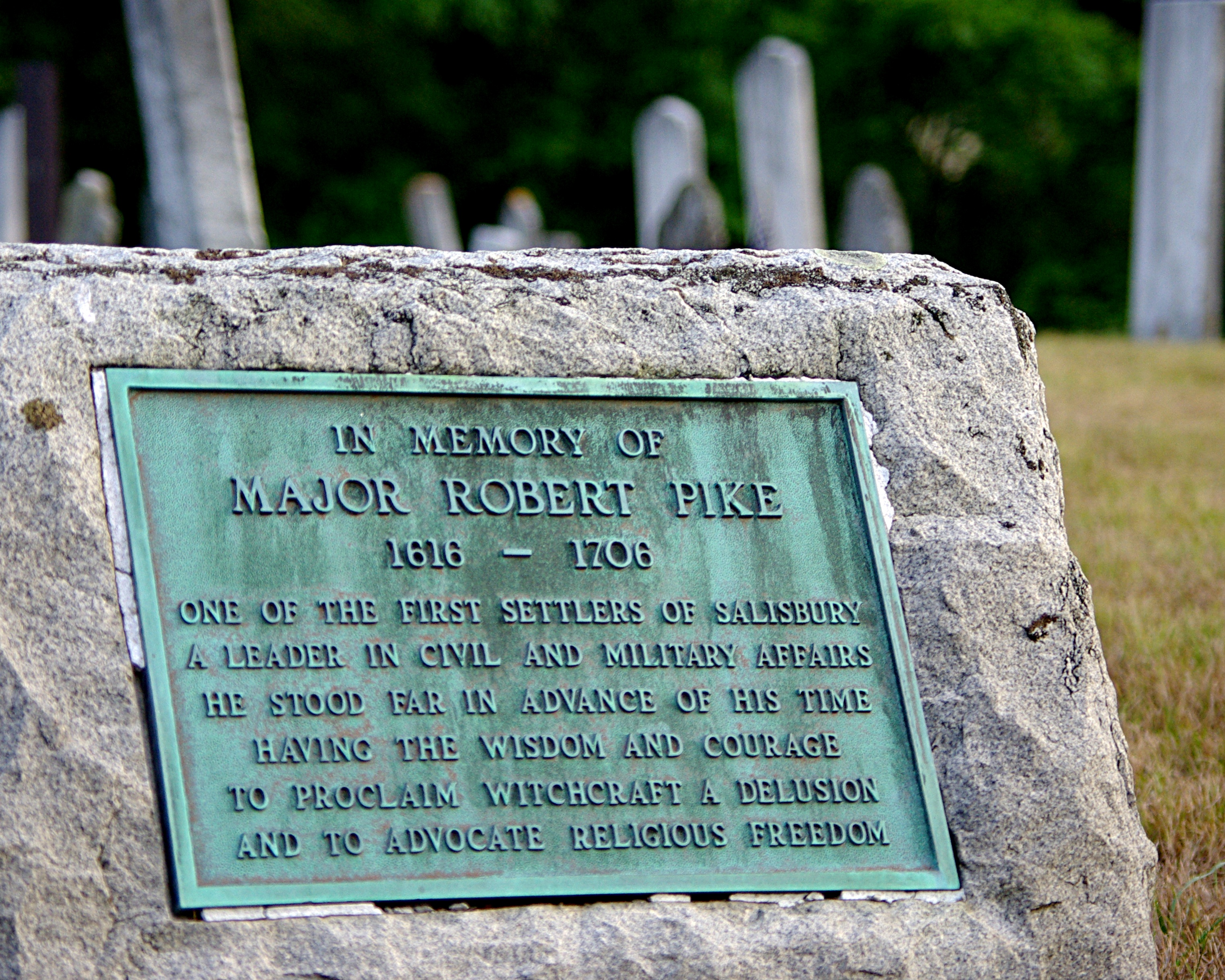
Memorial for Pike (1616–1706) in the Old Colonial Burying Grounds in Salisbury, Massachusetts.

Robert Pike (1616—1706) was an opponent of the Salem witchcraft prosecutions of 1692. He was also involved in two other notable public controversies prior to 1692. The first was his open criticism of the persecution of the Quakers, for which he was arraigned by the Massachusetts General Court in 1653. Years later, he became embroiled in a long feud with the pastor of Salisbury, the Reverend John Wheelwright, who excommunicated him in 1675 and was later obliged to reinstate him.

== Early life and education ==
Robert Pike was probably born in Landford, Wiltshire, England about 1616. He came to the Massachusetts Bay Colony in 1635 with his father, John Pike, and four siblings. His mother Dorothy Day had died several years before. They first settled in Newbury. Within a few years Robert Pike moved to the east side of the Merrimack River and became one of the founders and first land owners of Salisbury (originally called Colchester), where he remained the rest of his life.

Pike married Sarah Sanders, of Salisbury, on 3 April 1641. They raised eight children before her death in 1679. While nothing is known about his formal education in England, it is clear that he was well-educated, for he wrote with a flowing hand and could formulate well-reasoned arguments in his own defence and the defence of others. His brother, John Pike, also appears to have been well-educated prior to their arrival in 1635.

== Civic life ==
As one of the leading men of the new settlement that became Salisbury, Pike took on numerous civic and military duties and held several offices. In 1641, his first appointment was as a fence viewer, which involved the settling of disputes about property boundaries, "livestock proof" fences, and resolving disputes about fence repairs. In May 1644, he was appointed by the General Court, along with two others, with the power "to end small causes in Salisbury". In modern terms, this is roughly equivalent to a justice of the peace. By 1646, Pike was the leader of the local militia and known as Lieutenant Pike, then Major Pike. Thomas Bradbury, husband of Mary Bradbury, was second in command, as an ensign. In 1648, Salisbury elected Pike to the post of Deputy to the General Court, based in Boston. He was re-elected 10 times and later served one term as magistrate. At the time of King Philip's War (1675–78) Pike served as Sergeant-Major General (an archaic term which soon disappeared) and was responsible for much of the area North of Boston (Maine was then a part of Massachusetts). In King Philip's War, Captain Benjamin Church reported to Sergeant-Major Pike.

== In defence of Quakers ==
Small numbers of Quakers started arriving in New England by 1656. The Puritan-dominated General Court immediately enacted laws to discourage their activities. The new laws provided for harsh punishment to anyone who professed the "heretical opinions" of Quakers. They even punished ship captains who knowingly carried Quakers as passengers. However, these new measures brought heated debate within the General Court, as their passage was far from unanimous. The Deputies of the General Court, including Robert Pike, who represented the outlying areas, were much more likely to be sensitive to the issue of religious freedom and probably voted against the new laws. Nonetheless, numerous Quaker missionaries were punished by public whippings, banishment, and the threat of death if they returned to Massachusetts Bay Colony. Between 1659 and 1661, five Quakers, all of whom had returned to Boston to continue preaching publicly, were hanged.

In the winter of 1662, three Quaker women arrived in Dover, New Hampshire, to preach and soon after were arrested and ordered whipped. Richard Waldron, the magistrate at Dover, even went to the extreme of issuing a warrant declaring that the constables of 11 surrounding towns, including Salisbury, were to carry out public whippings of the three women. After they were transported in a cart to Salisbury, the third town of the 11, they were set free by the local authorities, who included Thomas Bradbury, Walter Barefoote, and Pike. While historians are uncertain as to some of the details, it is believed that Pike was the local constable and he deputised an eager Barefoote, who then "misused" his authority to free the women. In any case, over 200 years later, the Quaker poet John Greenleaf Whittier immortalised this cruel episode in his poem, "How the Women Went from Dover". One of the verses is engraved upon a stone memorial to Robert Pike in Salisbury Common.

"Cut loose these poor ones and let them go;

Come what will of it, all men shall know

No warrant is good, though backed by the Crown,

For whipping women in Salisbury town!"

Massachusetts property records substantiate that Major Pike was one of the owners of Nantucket who gave that island to the Quakers as a place of seclusion in which they would be less likely to be persecuted.

== Role in Salem witchcraft crisis ==
By 1692, Robert Pike had risen to the office of Assistant to the General Court. In that role, he was directed to take depositions of both the accused and the accuser, for the immediate region around Salisbury, during the witchcraft crisis of 1692. In May, he took notes regarding the stories and accusations against Susannah Martin of neighbouring Amesbury. More depositions against her followed in June. She was tried and convicted in Boston in late June, then executed by hanging on 19 July, along with Sarah Good, Rebecca Nurse, Elizabeth Howe and Sarah Wildes.

On 26 May 1692, George Herrick brought charges, on behalf of Ann Putnam and Mary Walcott, against Mary Bradbury of Salisbury. The wife of Thomas Bradbury, she was well known and respected by Robert Pike and many others. She was convicted in her final trial of 9 September, despite several witnesses supporting her and a petition on her behalf signed by 115 townspeople. Pike prepared her sworn statement on her behalf, defending her character and good works.

Prior to Mary Bradbury's conviction, Pike wrote a remarkable letter to Jonathan Corwin, one of the trial judges, in which he composed a tightly reasoned attack upon the use of spectral evidence and the testimony of the "afflicted girls" in general. While Pike, like all Puritans, believed witches and witchcraft existed and were the work of Satan, he was questioning the current methods of the court in determining credibility and guilt. In his letter of 9 August, Pike makes several points:

- Citing 1st Samuel xxviii 13, 14: Any person, virtuous or not, may be in truth a witch.
- A poor reputation does not suggest or substantiate guilt (as with Sarah Good).
- Satan is capable of presenting anyone's spectre to a tormented person (not only a witch's spectre).
- How can it be known if Satan acts with or without the permission of any specific (accused) person.
- It is completely contrary to a witch's well-being for them to practice witchcraft within a courtroom.
- It is likewise contrary for witches to accuse others of witchcraft (as was the case), as "they are all part of Satan's kingdom, which would fall, if divided against itself".

It is not known just how Pike's letter was received, since there is no written response, but with it he became one of the first of several prominent men to question the handling of the witchcraft crisis. Within a few weeks, Thomas Brattle and Samuel Willard of Boston wrote their own manuscripts, using some of the same arguments Pike had made. By October 1692, the activity of the courts was greatly diminished, the executions had ended, and the witchcraft crisis was effectively over.
