= Frank Pike =

Frank Pike may refer to:

- Private Pike, first name Frank, a fictional character in the British sitcom Dad's Army
- Frank Pike (soccer) (1930–2010), Canadian soccer player and coach
- Frank Pike (footballer) (1925–2011), Australian rules footballer
- Frank Pike (Arrowverse), a fictional character in the TV series Arrow

== See also ==
- Frank Pyke (1941–2011), Australian sports scientist, Australian rules footballer and sports administrator
