= John Pike (footballer) =

Australian rules footballer

Personal information
- Full name: John Thomas Pike
- Born: 18 July 1891; Point Nepean, Victoria
- Died: 17 July 1968 (aged 76); Fitzroy, Victoria

Playing career^{1}
Years	Club	Games (Goals)
1913	Essendon	4 (0)
- ^{1} Playing statistics correct to the end of 1913.

John Thomas Pike (18 July 1891 – 17 July 1968) was an Australian rules footballer who played with Essendon in the Victorian Football League (VFL).

== Family ==
The ninth and youngest child of Edward Pike (1848–1896), and Elizabeth Mary Pike (1848–1930), née Purdy, John Thomas Pike was born at Point Nepean, Victoria on 18 July 1891.
