= Nicholas Pike (mathematician) =

Nicholas Pike (1743–1819) was born in New Hampshire in the Thirteen Colonies. He was one of the first American-born mathematicians to dedicate a book to mathematics. His book talked about important math needed in the colonies, ranging from simple things like addition and multiplication, to more complicated areas like compounding interest on loans.

== Early life ==
Pike graduated in 1766 (aged 23) from Harvard University. He went on to earn an A.M. (Master's Degree) three years after, in 1769. He went on to serve the colonies in different ways, from being a public and private teacher, to being a selectman and even a justice of the peace.

== Career ==
Though Pike had many careers, he was a mathematician above all. He created one of the first mathematical textbooks that would be used by the new American school systems. This was very important because at the time, they were using books that were written in England to teach. The book was called A New and Complete System of Arithmetic Composed for Use of Citizens of the United States (1788). He worked closely to get this book pushed into the school system, because congress was looking to revamp the school system to slowly phase out the England authors, since they used more of the English currency at the time.

== A New and Complete System of Arithmetic Composed for Use of Citizens of the United States (1788) ==
This book had much influence in the early stages of the colonies because helped people understand complex issues when dealing with currency. He broke down the values of the Early American currency, which were pence, shillings, and pounds. This was taught in schools for younger people to better understand currency. This book touched on many topics, including simple subjects, such as addition and subtraction, and complex subjects, such as bartering, insurance policies, and compounding interest. For many reasons, this book was a gem for the colonies. It went through many revisions, making it suitable for teaching in elementary schools, and then more in depth versions for people to learn certain topics in further detail.
