= Maria Louisa Pike =

American naturalist

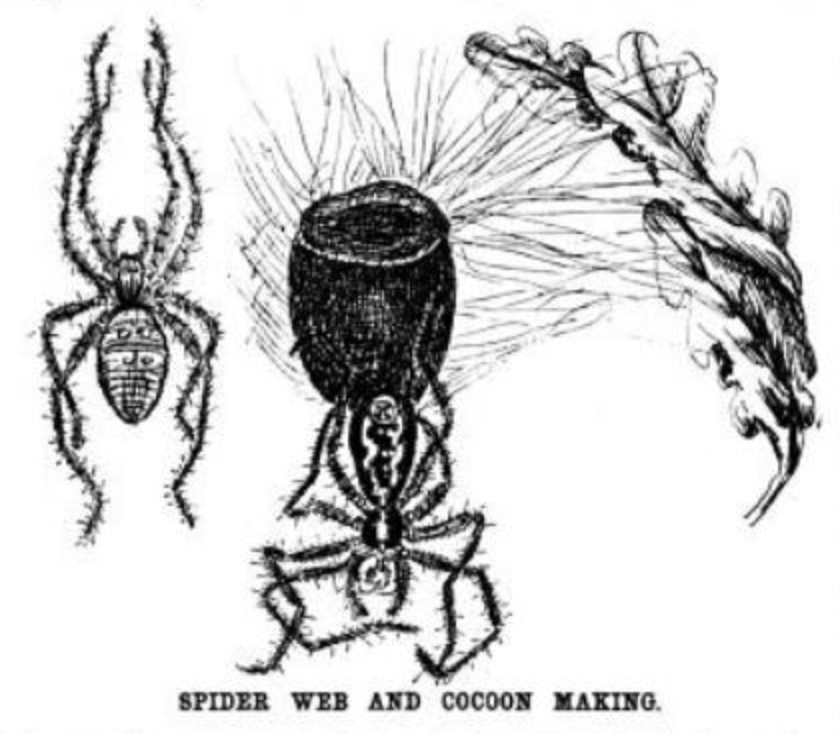
Pike's 1887 drawing of Argiope trifasciata making a cocoon.

Maria Louisa Pike (c. 1824 – 1892) was an American naturalist.

Born in England, her father was Benjamin Hadley, British Commissioner to South Africa. She was private secretary to her father for several years, and employed much of her spare time in studying and making sketches of the flora of South Africa. She went to Mauritius in 1870 and became acquainted with Nicolas Pike, U.S. consul, who was engaged in collecting natural history specimens for the Louis Agassiz Museum in Cambridge, Massachusetts. She assisted him in the classification of over 800 species of fish, of which she made many colored sketches. They married in 1875 and moved to America, where she contributed articles and illustrations to Scientific American, American Agriculturist, and American Garden. She produced color illustrations of a large collection of spiders made by her husband, and also made a nearly complete set of pen-and-ink drawings of North American snakes. She was a member of the Brooklyn Institute of Arts and Sciences.

She died in Brooklyn, New York, on March 23, 1892.

== Selected works ==
- Pike, Mrs. Nicolas (31 August 1889). "Spider Web and Cocoon Making". Scientific American. 61 (9): 130. doi:10.1038/scientificamerican08311889-130.
- Pike, Mrs. N. (1 February 1890). "Plants Useful yet Dangerous to Man". Scientific American Supplement (735): 11746.
- Pike, Mrs. N. (7 June 1890). "A Chat on Orchids". Scientific American. 62 (23): 355.
- Pike, Mrs. N. (17 January 1891). "The Destruction of Animal Life and Its Consequences". Scientific American. 64 (3): 37.
- Pike, Mrs. N. (13 February 1892). "Ferns: Their Preservative Properties and Varied Uses". Scientific American. 66 (7): 100. doi:10.1038/scientificamerican02131892-100a.
