= Geoffrey Pike =

Geoffrey Pike may refer to:

- Geoff Pike, English footballer
- Geoff Pike (author), Australian author, also writing as Pai Kit Fai
- Benny Pike (Geoffrey Benjamin Pike), Australian boxer at the 1980 Summer Olympics

== See also ==
- Geoffrey Pyke (1893–1948), English journalist, spy and inventor
