= Pike Creek =

Pike Creek may refer to:

== Place name ==
- Pike Creek, Delaware, United States
- Pike Creek, Ontario, Canada
- Pike Creek Township, Morrison County, Minnesota, United States
- Kenosha, Wisconsin (formerly Pike Creek)

== River ==
=== United States ===
- Pike Creek (White Clay Creek tributary), a stream in Delaware
- Pike Creek (Mississippi River), a stream in Minnesota
- Pike Creek (Current River), a stream in Missouri

=== Elsewhere ===
- Pike Creek (Queensland), a river in southern Queensland, Australia

== Road ==
- Pike Creek Bypass, a road in Essex County, Ontario, Canada

== See also ==
- Pikes Creek, Pennsylvania, United States, a census-designated place
