= Pikes Peak (disambiguation) =

Pikes Peak is a summit of the Rocky Mountains in North America.

Pikes Peak or Pike's Peak may also refer to:

== Other places ==
- Pikes Peak, Georgia
- Pikes Peak, Indiana
- Pikes Peak State Park, Iowa
- Pikes Peak (Missouri)

== Other uses ==
- Pike's Peak (album), by Dave Pike, 1962

== See also ==
- Pike's Peak Country, the gold mining region of the western United States near Pikes Peak
  - Pike's Peak gold rush, 1858–1861
- Pikes Peak International Hill Climb
