= Martin Pike =

Martin Pike is the name of

- Martin Pike (athlete) (1920–1997), British sprinter
- Martin Pike (English footballer) (born 1964), English footballer
- Martin Pike (Australian footballer) (born 1972), Australian rules footballer
