= Christopher Pike =

Christopher Pike is the name of:

- Christopher Pike (author) (born 1955), author who specializes in young adult thrillers
- Christopher Pike (Star Trek), a character in the fictional Star Trek universe
- Chris Pike (born 1961), Welsh former professional footballer
- Chris Pike (American football) (born 1964), former American football defensive tackle

== See also ==
- Chris Pine, American actor
- Christian Pike, American neuroscientist
