= George Pyke (footballer) =

Australian rules footballer

Personal information
- Full name: George William Pyke
- Born: 2 March 1887; Ararat, Victoria
- Died: 31 March 1960 (aged 73); Malvern, Victoria

Playing career^{1}
Years	Club	Games (Goals)
1909	Fitzroy	5 (1)
- ^{1} Playing statistics correct to the end of 1909.

George William Pyke (2 March 1887 – 31 March 1960) was an Australian rules footballer who played with Fitzroy in the Victorian Football League (VFL).

== Family ==
The son of Robert George Pyke (1853–1929), and Ellen Bryson Pyke (1861–1943), née McKerchar, later Mrs. Samuel Bilston, George William Pyke was born at Ararat, Victoria on 2 March 1887.

He married Eleanor Grace Turner (1887–1960) in 1910.
