= James Pike (disambiguation) =

James Pike (1913–1969) was an American Episcopal bishop.

James or Jim Pike may also refer to:

- James Shepherd Pike (1811–1882), American journalist
- James Pike (politician) (1818–1895), U.S. Representative from New Hampshire
- Jim Pike (jockey) (1892–1969), Australian jockey during the 1930s
- Jim Pike, American musician (The Lettermen)

== See also ==
- James Pyke (disambiguation)
