= Maria Louise Eve =

American poet

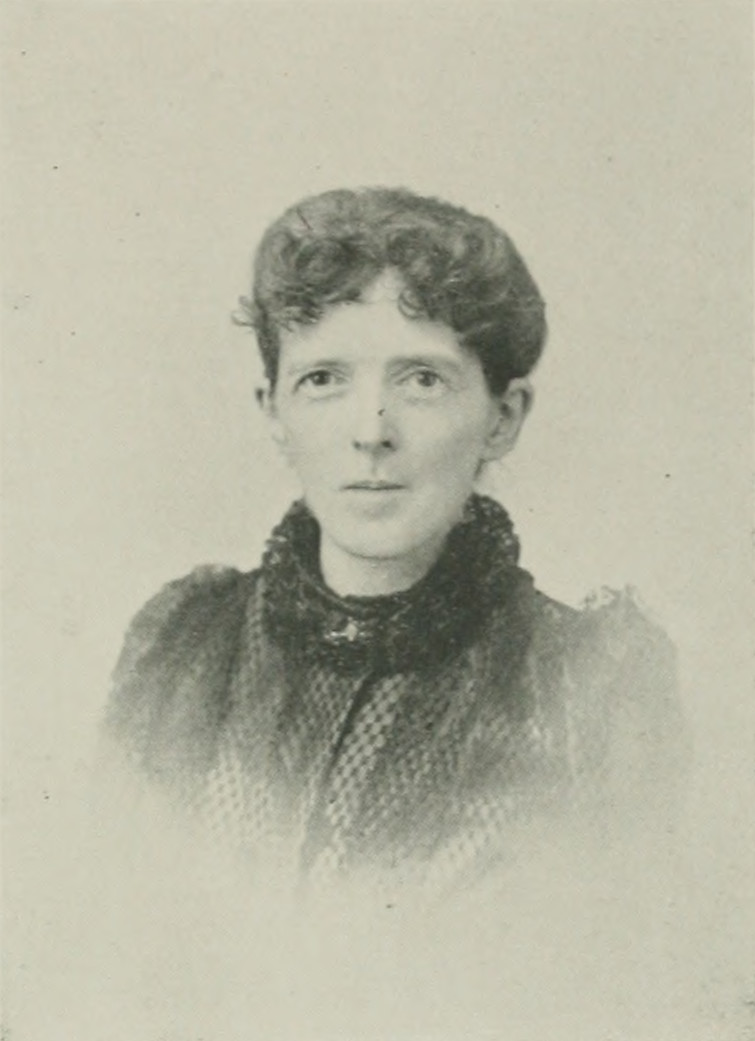
- Photo in A Woman of the Century
- Born: February 11, 1842; Augusta, Georgia, US
- Died: April 5, 1900 (aged 58)
- Resting place: Augusta, Georgia
- Occupation: author
- Writing career
- Genres: poetry; prose

Maria Louise Eve (February 11, 1842 – April 5, 1900) as a 19th-century American author of poetry and prose. In 1866, she secured a prize of US$100 for a prose essay, and in 1879, a prize of the same amount for the best poem, expressing the gratitude of the South to the North for aid in the yellow fever epidemic. Her "Brier Rose" won the prize for the best poem offered by The Augusta Chronicle in 1889, and her poem, "The Lion and Eagle", a welcome to the England peace deputation, attracted much attention. Her writings were limited in number, but were of excellent quality. Of Eve's poems, the best known are "Conquered at Last," "Woes of Ireland," Unfulfilled," "Filling his Place," "Easter Morning," and "The Lion and the Eagle."

== Early life and education ==
Maria Louise Eve was born February 11, 1842, near Augusta, Georgia. She was the daughter of Dr. Edward Armstrong Eve, a physician, and Sarah Jane Raiford. Her ancestors were of old English ancestry. Her great-great-grandfather, Oswell Eve, commanded a man-of-war, The Roebuck, under George III, in ante-revolutionary days. Upon the opening of hostilities, he requested "to be sent on other service, as he had many friends in the Colonies". The family afterward came to America, locating first in Philadelphia, removing to Charleston, South Carolina, and finally to the neighborhood of Augusta, Georgia.

From childhood she showed a love for both poetry and prose.

== Career ==
Her first literary success was a prize for the best essay awarded by Scott's Monthly Magazine. Thereafter, she contributed, from time to time, articles on literary and other subjects to some of the prominent magazines and papers of her day. In 1879, her poem "Conquered at Last" won the prize offered by the Mobile, Alabama News for the best poem expressing the gratitude of the South to the North for aid in the yellow fever scourge of the preceding year. That poem was reproduced in nearly all of the papers and many of the magazines of the North, and also in some periodicals abroad. Its great popularity throughout the North, attested by the large number of letters received by her from soldiers and civilians was a complete surprise as well as a great gratification to her. In June 1889, a short poem by her, entitled "A Briar Rose", won the prize offered by The Augusta Chronicle. At the request of the secretary of the American Peace and Arbitration Society, in Boston, as a message of welcome to the English Peace Deputation to America in October 1887, she wrote a poem, "The Lion and the Eagle". The underlying thought of the "Universal Peace," as found in one of her published poems, led the secretary to communicate with her in regard to it, and she subsequently wrote a number of poems bearing on the subject.

=== "Conquered at Last" ===
Shortly after a yellow-fever scourge swept up the Mississippi Valley the Mobile News offered a prize for the poem by a Southern writer which best expressed the gratitude of the Southern heart towards the people of the North for the philanthropy and magnanimity displayed during the civil war. Seventy-seven compositions from various parts of the South were produced, and the prize was finally awarded to Eve, the author of "Conquered at Last".

You came to us once, O brothers, in wrath,
And rude desolation followed your path.
You conquered us then, but only in part,
For a stubborn thing is the human heart.
So the mad wind blows in his might and main,
And the forests bend to his breath like grain
Their heads in the dust and their branches broke;
But how shall he soften their hearts of oak?
You swept o'er our land like the whirlwind's wing;
But the human heart is a stubborn thing.
We laid down our arms, we yielded our will;
But our heart of heart was unconquered still.
"We are vanquished," we said, "but our wounds
must heal;" We gave you our swords, but our hearts were steel.
"We are conquered," we said, but our hearts were sore,
And " Woe to the conquered " on every door.
But the Spoiler came and he would not spare.
The angel that walketh in darkness was there;—
He walked through the valley, walked through the street,
And he left the print of his fiery feet
In the dead, dead, dead, that were everywhere,
And buried away with never a prayer.
From the desolate land, from its very heart,
There went forth a cry'to the uttermost part:—
You heard it, O brothers!—with never a measure
You opened your hearts and poured out your treasure.
O Sisters of Mercy, you gave above these!
For you helped, we know, on your bended knees.
Your pity was human, but O! it was more,
For you shared our cross and our burden bore.
Your lives in your hands you stood by our side;
Your lives for our lives—you laid down and died.
And no greater love hath a man to give,
Than to lay down his life that his friends may live.
You poured in our wounds the oil and the wine
That you brought to us from a Hand Divine.
You conquered us once, our swords we gave;
We yield now our hearts—they are all we have.
Our last trench was there, and it held out long:
It is yours, O friends! and you'll find it strong.
Your love had a magic diviner than art,
And "Conquered by Kindness" we'll write on our heart.

== Death ==
Maria Louisa Eve died in Georgia, April 5, 1900.

== Selected works ==
- "Conquered at Last"
- "Woes of Ireland"
- "Unfulfilled"
- "Filling his Place"
- "Easter Morning"
- "The Lion and the Eagle"
