= Frank Pyke =

Personal information
- Full name: Frank Sherman Pyke
- Born: 1 December 1941; Perth, Western Australia
- Died: 22 November 2011 (aged 69); Perth, Western Australia
- Original team: Armadale Juniors
- Positions: Half-forward flanker, ruck-rover

Playing career^{1}
Years	Club	Games (Goals)
1959–73	Perth	130 (154)

Representative team honours
Years	Team	Games (Goals)
1963–66	Western Australia	2 (1)
- ^{1} Playing statistics correct to the end of 1973.

Career highlights
- WANFL representative team 1963, 1966; Runner-up Sandover Medal 1963; Perth premiership side 1966

Frank Sherman Pyke (1 December 1941 – 22 November 2011) was an Australian sports scientist, educator, author, Australian rules footballer and sports administrator. He played 130 games for Perth in the Western Australian National Football League (WANFL) and two interstate matches for Western Australia, and later served as a professor at a number of universities in Australia, Canada and the United States. He also served as the inaugural executive director of the Victorian Institute of Sport (VIS), where he pioneered the Athlete Career and Education (ACE) program.

== Career ==
=== Early life and football career ===
Born in Perth, Western Australia, on 1 December 1941, Pyke played schoolboy cricket and football and was also a noted athlete, winning state championships in running, long jump and high jump. He represented Western Australia at the 1956 National Schoolboys' Championships held in Launceston. He made his debut for Armadale in the South Suburban Football League at the age of 15. Falling into the Perth Football Club's recruitment zone, Pyke made his senior debut for the club in round one of the 1959 season, at the age of 17. Playing originally as a half-forward flanker, and later as an onballer, Pyke became a regular in the Perth side, and finished third in the Sandover Medal in 1962 and second in 1963, behind Ray Sorrell. He played in the club's 1966 premiership win over East Perth, playing as a loose man in defence during part of the game. Pyke also opened the bowling for the Perth Cricket Club in the WACA district cricket competition. Outside of sports, he worked as a physical education teacher at Belmont Senior High School.

=== Education career ===
In December 1966, Pyke left Perth with his wife, Janet, to study sports science at Indiana University Bloomington. He graduated with a PhD in exercise physiology and human performance, and later taught at Illinois State University in Normal, Illinois, and Dalhousie University in Halifax, Nova Scotia. Pyke returned to Western Australia in 1972, where he accepted a position as a lecturer in the Department of Physical Education and Recreation at the University of Western Australia (UWA), and resumed his football career with Perth. While at UWA he was involved with the rehabilitation of fast bowler Dennis Lillee, who Pyke had previously taught at Belmont Senior High School. He is credited by some with "saving [Lillee]'s cricket career" and "[giving Lillee] back his fire".

Pyke later served as the inaugural Head of the Centre for Sports Studies at the University of Canberra, Head of the Department of Human Movement and Sports Science at the University of Wollongong and Professor and Head of the Department of Human Movement Studies at the University of Queensland. He also held adjunct professor status at Deakin University, the University of Ballarat and UWA. Pyke was appointed the inaugural Executive Director of the Victorian Institute of Sport (VIS) in 1990, a position which he held until 2006. During his tenure at the VIS, he developed a number of programs, including the Athlete Career and Education (ACE), which has been credited as "the program nationally for elite athletes". He was awarded an Australian Sports Medal in 2000, life membership of the Australian Council for Health, Physical Education and Recreation in 2002 and was made a member of the Sports Australia Hall of Fame in 2003. He was awarded the 2010 Mobley International Distinguished Alumni Award by Indiana University. Pyke was diagnosed with motor neurone disease midway through 2011, and died in November 2011.

== Personal life ==
Pyke had three children with his wife Janet: Stephen, James, who played football for Norwood and cricket for South Australia, and Don Pyke, who played football for Claremont and the West Coast Eagles and was the former senior coach of the Adelaide Crows.

== Publications ==
Pyke has authored, co-authored and edited a number of books and articles, mainly on sports science and medicine:

=== Books ===
1. Football: the scientific way (1975; with Ross Smith)
2. The grid system for skill practice in Australian football (1977; with Lawrence Woodman)
3. Running man: a multidisciplinary introduction to physical education (1977; as co-editor with Geoffrey Watson)
4. Focus on running : an introduction to human movement (1978; as co-editor with Geoffrey Watson)
5. Physiological considerations during exercise in hot climates (1981)
6. Towards better coaching: the art and science of sports coaching (1981; as editor)
7. Sport in the heat (1985)
8. Training for sports and fitness (1990; with Brent Rushall)
9. Better coaching: advanced coach's manual (1991; as editor)
10. Gold rush: a decade of success (2000)
11. Champions in sport and life: the Victorian Institute of Sport, 1990–2005 (2006)
12. Champions in sport and life: and the companies that make it happen (2006)
13. Cutting edge cricket (2010; with Ken Davis)
14. Going for gold: champions from the West (2010)

=== Articles ===
- Mallett, C. J. and Pyke, F. S. (1 January 2008). Coaching the best. Sports Coach, 30 1: pages 6–8.
- Pyke, F. S. (1966) The effect of selected preliminary activities on certain maximal performances. University of Western Australia (thesis).
- Pyke, F. S. (14–19 January 1979). The physical educator and physical fitness. 12th Conference of the Australian Council for Health Physical Education and Recreation.
- Pyke, F. S. (2007). Science in Australian sport: its origins and challenges. Sport Health, volume 25, number 2, Winter 2007, pages 26–27.
