= George Pike =

Australian rules footballer

Personal information
- Full name: George Campbell Pike
- Born: 22 January 1923; Geelong, Victoria
- Died: 19 September 2007 (aged 84); Bridgewater, Victoria
- Original team: East Geelong
- Height: 180 cm (5 ft 11 in)
- Weight: 74 kg (163 lb)

Playing career^{1}
Years	Club	Games (Goals)
1947–49	Geelong	14 (11)
- ^{1} Playing statistics correct to the end of 1949.

George Campbell Pike (22 January 1923 – 19 September 2007) was an Australian rules footballer who played with Geelong in the Victorian Football League (VFL).

Pike served in the Australian Army during World War II, seeing active duty in New Guinea.
