= Bob Pike (surfer) =

Australian surfer

Bob Pike (20 May 1940 – 20 May 1999), born Robert Hughes Pike, was an Australian surfer who specialized in big wave surfing.

== Biography ==
Pike was born in Sydney, the son of a former surf champion. In 1954, Pike entered his first surf competition at age 14. He would soon become noticed for his excellence at surfing big waves. In 1961, Pike travelled to Hawaii where he would pursue some of the state's biggest surf breaks. In 1962, he won a shorebreak competition in Peru, becoming one of the first Australian competitors to win an international surf competition. Pike would later leave professional surfing, after disliking the way that competition had taken over the sport. Pike continued to surf recreationally and joined the fire brigade. He would eventually become station chief of Narrabeen Fire Station. After retirement in 1997, Pike suffered an injury that left him unable to stand on a surfboard. Two years later, Pike died by suicide in 1999.

In February 2000, Manly Council dedicated a plaque on Manly Beach to Pike's memory.

== Filmography ==
Pike appeared in the following surfing documentaries:

- Locked In! (1964)
- Stop the Wave, I Want to Get Off (1965)
- The Endless Summer (1966) (cameo)
