= Pike, West Virginia =

Pike
- Unincorporated community
- Location within the state of West Virginia Pike (the United States)
- Coordinates: 39°17′0″N 81°4′53″W
- Country: United States
- State: West Virginia
- County: Ritchie
- Elevation: 807 ft (246 m)
- Time zone: UTC-5 (Eastern (EST))
  - Summer (DST): UTC-4 (EDT)
- GNIS ID: 1544847

Pike is an unincorporated community in Ritchie County, West Virginia, United States.

The community was named for a turnpike intersection near the original town site.
