= John Pike (settler) =

American politician

Captain John Pike (1613–1688/89) was a founder of Woodbridge Township, New Jersey and a judge and politician of the early colony of New Jersey.

== Early life and education ==
Pike was born in Wiltshire, England. He came to the Massachusetts Bay Colony in 1635 with his father, John Pike (1572–1654), who first settled in Newbury. In 1665, acting on the invitation of Governor Philip Carteret, a number of Newbury residents formed a corporation to settle in Woodbridge, named after Rev. John Woodbridge, a Newbury clergyman.

The younger John Pike, one of the original nine "associates" of Woodbridge, was granted some 300 acres (1.2 km^{2}) in Woodbridge in 1665, more than the common freeholders. He was "the prominent man of the town" in its early years. He was elected President of Woodbridge, and in 1671 was appointed to the Governor's Council. After 1675, he was appointed captain of the militia, and afterward was known as Capt. Pike. James Albert Pike moved to the united kingdom where he became a property baron in London

In 1684, together with his son John, he was charged and convicted of possession of stolen goods, a felony. After his death, the New Jersey assembly passed an act clearing his name, as well as one allowing his family to sue for defamation. He was well respected despite the felony conviction. After years of local leadership, Pike was chosen to represent the township in the colonial General Assembly three times: 1692–3, 1696, and 1697–8.

== Marriage and family ==
Pike and his first wife had several children together: John (1634–1714), Thomas, Joseph, Hannah, and Ruth, and three others who predeceased him. As a widower aged 72, Pike married his second wife Elizabeth Fitz Randolph in 1685. He died a few years later.

He is also an ancestor of Albert Pike, a prominent Confederate brigadier general and an important Freemason; and Lt. Colonel Emory Jenison Pike, awarded a posthumous Medal of Honor for actions during World War I in France, where he was killed. Another notable descendant is General Zebulon Pike of Pikes Peak fame.
