= National Register of Historic Places listings in Davidson County, Tennessee =

Location of Davidson County in Tennessee

This is a list of the National Register of Historic Places listings in Davidson County, Tennessee.

This is intended to be a complete list of the properties and districts on the National Register of Historic Places in Davidson County, Tennessee, United States. Latitude and longitude coordinates are provided for many National Register properties and districts; these locations may be seen together in a map.

There are 203 properties and districts listed on the National Register in the county, including 7 National Historic Landmarks.

See also National Register of Historic Places listings in Sumner County, Tennessee for additional properties in Goodlettsville, a city that spans the county line.

Contents: Counties in Tennessee
Anderson – Bedford – Benton – Bledsoe – Blount – Bradley – Campbell – Cannon – Carroll – Carter – Cheatham – Chester – Claiborne – Clay – Cocke – Coffee – Crockett – Cumberland – Davidson – Decatur – DeKalb – Dickson – Dyer – Fayette – Fentress – Franklin – Gibson – Giles – Grainger – Greene – Grundy – Hamblen – Hamilton – Hancock – Hardeman – Hardin – Hawkins – Haywood – Henderson – Henry – Hickman – Houston – Humphreys – Jackson – Jefferson – Johnson – Knox – Lake – Lauderdale – Lawrence – Lewis – Lincoln – Loudon – Macon – Madison – Marion – Marshall – Maury – McMinn – McNairy – Meigs – Monroe – Montgomery – Moore – Morgan – Obion – Overton – Perry – Pickett – Polk – Putnam – Rhea – Roane – Robertson – Rutherford – Scott – Sequatchie – Sevier – Shelby – Smith – Stewart – Sullivan – Sumner – Tipton – Trousdale – Unicoi – Union – Van Buren – Warren – Washington – Wayne – Weakley – White – Williamson – Wilson

This National Park Service list is complete through NPS recent listings posted June 6, 2026.

== Current listings ==
	Name on the Register	Image	Date listed	Location	City or town	Description
1	Acme Farm Supply Building	Acme Farm Supply Building	April 2, 1998 (#98000320)	101 Broadway; 36°09′43″N 86°46′28″W	Nashville	
2	Airdrie		September 15, 2005 (#05001027)	3210 Avenal Ave. 36°06′11″N 86°43′54″W	Nashville	
3	Alumni Memorial Hall, Vanderbilt University	Alumni Memorial Hall, Vanderbilt University	July 6, 2011 (#11000418)	2205 West End Ave. 36°08′53″N 86°48′12″W	Nashville	
4	American Baptist Theological Seminary Historic District	American Baptist Theological Seminary Historic District	June 14, 2013 (#13000399)	1800 Baptist World Center Dr. 36°12′09″N 86°47′24″W	Nashville	
5	Archeological Site 40DV307		March 12, 2015 (#14000940)	Address Restricted	Nashville	
6	Archeological Site No. 40DV35		December 16, 1992 (#92001655)	Cockrill Bend, 0.25 miles (0.40 km) south of the Cumberland River; 36°12′09″N 86°54′04″W	Nashville	
7	Beech Grove	Beech Grove	November 8, 2007 (#07001163)	8423 Old Harding Pike; 36°01′24″N 87°01′22″W	Nashville	
8	Belair	Belair	May 6, 1971 (#71000815)	2250 Lebanon Rd. 36°10′09″N 86°41′15″W	Nashville	
9	Belle Meade Plantation	Belle Meade Plantation	December 30, 1969 (#69000177)	Harding Rd. at Leake Ave. 36°06′20″N 86°51′52″W	Belle Meade	
10	Belle Meade Apartments	Belle Meade Apartments	April 19, 1984 (#84003474)	715 Belle Meade Boulevard; 36°05′47″N 86°51′28″W	Belle Meade	
11	Belle Meade Golf Links Subdivision Historic District		July 7, 2004 (#04000675)	Roughly bounded by Windsor Dr., Blackburn and Pembroke Aves., Westover Dr., and Harding Pl. 36°06′07″N 86°51′48″W	Belle Meade	
12	Belle Vue	Belle Vue	October 25, 1973 (#73001758)	7306 Old Harding Rd., off U.S. Route 70S; 36°04′00″N 86°56′17″W	Bellevue	
13	Belmont Mansion	Belmont Mansion	May 6, 1971 (#71000816)	Belmont Boulevard; 36°08′09″N 86°47′41″W	Nashville	
14	Belmont–Hillsboro Historic District	Belmont–Hillsboro Historic District	May 1, 1980 (#80003784)	Roughly bounded by Primrose and 20th Avenues and Magnolia and Belmont Boulevards; 36°07′48″N 86°47′52″W	Nashville	
15	Bennie-Dillon Building	Bennie-Dillon Building	August 16, 1984 (#84003483)	702 Church St. 36°09′44″N 86°46′59″W	Nashville	
16	Berger Building	Berger Building	November 8, 1984 (#84000376)	164 N. 8th Ave. 36°09′39″N 86°46′59″W	Nashville	
17	Bluefields Historic District		March 22, 2016 (#16000116)	2600-2733 Bluefield Ave., 201-279 Cumberland & 2700-2724 Overhill Cirs., 104-165 Spring Valley Dr. 36°10′02″N 86°40′07″W	Nashville	
18	Brick Church Mound and Village Site	Brick Church Mound and Village Site	May 7, 1973 (#73001759)	East of Brick Church Pike; 36°14′51″N 86°46′32″W	Nashville	A multi-mound Mississippian culture site, leveled in the 1970s and 80s for a residential neighborhood
19	Broadway Historic District	Broadway Historic District	July 18, 1980 (#80003785)	Broadway between 2nd and 5th Aves. 36°09′40″N 86°46′38″W	Nashville	
20	James Buchanan House	James Buchanan House	March 29, 1984 (#84003486)	2910 Elm Hill Pike; 36°08′41″N 86°39′26″W	Nashville	
21	Buena Vista Historic District	Buena Vista Historic District	April 24, 1980 (#80003786)	Bounded by Interstate 65 and U.S. Route 41; 36°10′34″N 86°47′50″W	Nashville	
22	Bush-Herbert Building	Bush-Herbert Building	March 25, 1982 (#82003959)	174 3rd. Ave., N. 36°09′49″N 86°46′38″W	Nashville	
23	Cameron School	Cameron School	March 15, 2005 (#05000180)	1034 1st Ave., S. 36°08′55″N 86°45′51″W	Nashville	
24	Cane Ridge Cumberland Presbyterian Church	Cane Ridge Cumberland Presbyterian Church	December 12, 1976 (#76001770)	Southeast of Antioch on Old Hickory Boulevard; 36°00′06″N 86°38′02″W	Antioch	
25	Capers C.M.E. Church	Capers C.M.E. Church	January 2, 1985 (#85000045)	319 15th Ave., N. 36°09′34″N 86°47′43″W	Nashville	
26	Capitol Hill Redevelopment District		March 23, 2026 (#100012838)	James Robertson Parkway; 36°10′01″N 86°47′06″W	Nashville	
27	Carnegie Library	Carnegie Library	January 2, 1985 (#85003769)	17th Ave. N. on the Fisk University campus 36°10′04″N 86°48′18″W	Nashville	Designed by African-American architect Moses McKissack III; built in 1908; now serves as Fisk's academic building.
28	Cartwright-Moss House		August 1, 1979 (#79002420)	760 Old Dickerson Pike; 36°18′13″N 86°43′22″W	Goodlettsville	
29	Castner-Knott Building	Castner-Knott Building	August 20, 1999 (#99000957)	616-618 Church St. 36°09′45″N 86°46′56″W	Nashville	
30	James A. Cayce Administration Service Building	James A. Cayce Administration Service Building	December 13, 2019 (#100004689)	701 S. 6th St. 36°09′58″N 86°45′32″W	Nashville	
31	Centennial Park	Centennial Park	July 15, 2008 (#08000689)	West End Ave. at its junction with 25th Ave. N. 36°08′59″N 86°48′47″W	Nashville	
32	Robert Chadwell House	Robert Chadwell House	November 13, 1989 (#89001972)	712 Neeleys Bend Rd. 36°15′09″N 86°41′48″W	Madison	
33	Cheatham Building	Cheatham Building	February 21, 1980 (#80003787)	301-309 Church St. 36°09′50″N 86°46′39″W	Nashville	
34	William T. Cheek Sr. House		March 20, 2026 (#100012837)	712 Enquirer Avenue; 36°05′49″N 86°51′31″W	Belle Meade	
35	Cheekwood	Cheekwood	August 23, 2000 (#00000993)	1200 Forrest Park Dr. 36°05′11″N 86°52′26″W	Nashville	
36	Christ Church	Christ Church	November 14, 1978 (#78002577)	900 Broadway; 36°09′32″N 86°47′00″W	Nashville	
37	Church of the Assumption	Church of the Assumption	August 22, 1977 (#77001262)	1227 7th Ave., N. 36°10′31″N 86°47′30″W	Nashville	
38	Clark Memorial Methodist Church Complex		August 2, 2024 (#100010663)	1014 14th Avenue North and 1218–1220 Phillips Street; 36°10′09″N 86°48′00″W	Nashville	
39	Cleveland Hall	Cleveland Hall	April 16, 1971 (#71000821)	4041 Old Hickory Boulevard; 36°13′46″N 86°37′38″W	Old Hickory	
40	Clover Bottom Farm	Clover Bottom Farm	April 3, 1975 (#75001747)	2941 Lebanon Rd. 36°10′11″N 86°38′58″W	Donelson	Enlarged and renamed (from Clover Bottom Mansion to Clover Bottom Farm) on May 7, 2019.
41	Club Baron		March 12, 2026 (#100012798)	2614 Jefferson Street; 36°10′05″N 86°49′05″W	Nashville	
42	Cole House	Cole House	December 27, 1974 (#74001907)	2001 Lebanon Rd. 36°09′24″N 86°42′28″W	Nashville	
43	Anna Russell Cole Auditorium	Anna Russell Cole Auditorium	April 17, 1980 (#80003788)	Tennessee Preparatory School campus 36°07′56″N 86°44′28″W	Nashville	
44	Mrs. Edward B. Craig House	Mrs. Edward B. Craig House	October 27, 2003 (#03001078)	1418 Chickering Rd. 36°04′18″N 86°52′03″W	Forest Hills	
45	Cummins Station	Cummins Station	November 17, 1983 (#83004233)	Demonbreun and 10th Ave., S. 36°09′19″N 86°46′58″W	Nashville	
46	Davidson County Courthouse	Davidson County Courthouse	March 23, 1987 (#87000670)	Public Sq. 36°10′02″N 86°46′43″W	Nashville	
47	Demonbreun's Cave	Demonbreun's Cave	February 7, 1980 (#80003789)	1700 Omohumdro Dr. 36°09′55″N 86°42′57″W	Nashville	
48	Devon Farm	Devon Farm	August 28, 1974 (#74001908)	South of Nashville on State Route 100; 36°03′28″N 86°55′11″W	Nashville	
49	Doctor's Building	Doctor's Building	July 25, 1985 (#85001607)	706 Church St. 36°09′44″N 86°46′59″W	Nashville	
50	Dozier Farm	Dozier Farm	November 1, 1990 (#90001580)	8451 River Rd. Pike; 36°12′16″N 86°58′36″W	Nashville	
51	Dubuisson-Neuhoff House	Dubuisson-Neuhoff House	October 27, 2003 (#03001077)	1407 Chickering Rd. 36°04′24″N 86°52′01″W	Forest Hills	
52	Guildford Dudley, Sr. and Anne Dallas House		October 23, 2003 (#03001080)	5401 Hillsboro Pike; 36°05′07″N 86°50′04″W	Forest Hills	
53	Arthur J. Dyer Observatory	Arthur J. Dyer Observatory	March 6, 2009 (#09000114)	1000 Oman Dr. 36°03′08″N 86°48′17″W	Brentwood	
54	East Nashville High and Junior High Schools	East Nashville High and Junior High Schools	January 25, 2002 (#01001552)	110 and 112 Gallatin Rd. 36°10′52″N 86°45′10″W	Nashville	
55	East Nashville Historic District	East Nashville Historic District	April 15, 1982 (#82003960)	Roughly bounded by Gallatin Pike, Edgewood Pl., N. 16th St., and Russell Sts. 36°10′39″N 86°44′42″W	Nashville	
56	Edgefield Historic District	Edgefield Historic District	July 13, 1977 (#77001263)	Roughly bounded by Woodland, S. 10th and S. 5th Sts., and Shelby Ave. 36°10′22″N 86°45′28″W	Nashville	
57	Eighth Avenue South Reservoir	Eighth Avenue South Reservoir	March 30, 1978 (#78002578)	8th Ave., S. 36°08′21″N 86°46′49″W	Nashville	
58	Ellis Service Station Garage	Ellis Service Station Garage	April 15, 1991 (#91000436)	2000 Old Murfreesboro Rd. 36°05′50″N 86°39′13″W	Nashville	
59	Elm Street Methodist Church	Elm Street Methodist Church	May 15, 1984 (#84003496)	616 5th Ave., S. 36°09′11″N 86°46′24″W	Nashville	
60	Alexander Ewing House	Alexander Ewing House	November 25, 1980 (#80003790)	5101 Buena Vista Pike; 36°14′03″N 86°49′38″W	Nashville	
61	Exit/In	Exit/In	March 28, 2023 (#100008789)	2208 Elliston Pl. 36°09′05″N 86°48′15″W	Nashville	
62	Fall School	Fall School	December 19, 1979 (#79002421)	1116 S. 8th Ave. 36°08′32″N 86°46′43″W	Nashville	
63	Federal Office Building	Federal Office Building	December 26, 1972 (#72001232)	701 Broadway; 36°09′31″N 86°46′53″W	Nashville	The 1877 Federal Custom House and Courthouse
64	Federal Office Building	Federal Office Building	October 24, 2016 (#16000739)	801 Broadway; 36°09′30″N 86°46′58″W	Nashville	Now known as the Estes Kefauver Federal Building and United States Courthouse.
65	Federal Reserve Bank of Atlanta	Federal Reserve Bank of Atlanta	October 10, 1984 (#84000089)	226 N. 3rd Ave. 36°09′58″N 86°46′45″W	Nashville	
66	Fifth Avenue Historic District	Fifth Avenue Historic District	December 5, 1983 (#83004234)	Roughly bounded by Church and Union Sts. and 4th, 5th, and 6th Aves. 36°09′50″N 86°46′50″W	Nashville	
67	Fire Hall No. 1	Fire Hall No. 1	July 23, 2008 (#08000691)	1312 3rd Ave., N. 36°10′43″N 86°47′12″W	Nashville	
68	Fire Hall for Engine Company No. 18	Fire Hall for Engine Company No. 18	June 24, 2016 (#16000416)	1220 Gallatin Ave. 36°11′31″N 86°44′42″W	Nashville	
69	First Baptist Church East Nashville	First Baptist Church East Nashville	July 27, 2005 (#05000761)	601 Main St. 36°10′33″N 86°45′46″W	Nashville	
70	First Community Church		August 2, 2024 (#100010662)	1815 Knowles Street; 36°10′20″N 86°48′32″W	Nashville	
71	First Presbyterian Church	First Presbyterian Church	July 8, 1970 (#70000608)	154 5th Ave., N. 36°09′46″N 86°46′47″W	Nashville	
72	Fisk University Historic District	Fisk University Historic District	February 9, 1978 (#78002579)	Roughly bounded by 16th and 18th Aves. and Hermosa, Herman and Jefferson Sts. 36°10′04″N 86°48′17″W	Nashville	
73	Fort Negley	Fort Negley	April 21, 1975 (#75001748)	Ridley Boulevard and Chestnut St. 36°08′42″N 86°46′28″W	Nashville	
74	Frost Building	Frost Building	November 25, 1980 (#80003791)	161 8th Ave., N. 36°09′38″N 86°47′00″W	Nashville	
75	James Geddes Engine Company No. 6	James Geddes Engine Company No. 6	January 9, 1978 (#78002580)	629 2nd Ave., S. 36°09′16″N 86°46′14″W	Nashville	
76	John Geist and Sons Blacksmith Shop and House	John Geist and Sons Blacksmith Shop and House	April 29, 1980 (#80003792)	311 and 313 Jefferson St. 36°10′28″N 86°47′06″W	Nashville	Boundary decrease July 22, 2016 removed 309 Jefferson Street.
77	Germantown Historic District	Germantown Historic District	August 1, 1979 (#79002422)	Bounded by Jefferson, Hume, Rosa Parks, and Third; 36°10′36″N 86°47′25″W	Nashville	
78	Gilbert Mansion	Gilbert Mansion	March 28, 1979 (#79002423)	1906 West End Ave. 36°09′08″N 86°47′54″W	Nashville	
79	Gladstone Apartments	Gladstone Apartments	June 16, 1983 (#83003025)	3803 West End Ave. 36°07′54″N 86°49′55″W	Nashville	
80	Glen Leven	Glen Leven	November 17, 2008 (#8001085)	4000 Franklin Rd., 36°06′13″N 86°46′18″W	Oak Hill	
81	Glen Oak	Glen Oak	November 17, 1983 (#83004235)	2012 25th Ave., S. 36°07′57″N 86°48′24″W	Nashville	
82	Grand Ole Opry House	Grand Ole Opry House	January 27, 2015 (#14001222)	2804 Opryland Dr. 36°12′23″N 86°41′30″W	Nashville	Main home of the Grand Ole Opry since 1974.
83	Grassmere	Grassmere	July 19, 1984 (#84003503)	Nolensville Rd. 36°05′16″N 86°44′26″W	Nashville	Plantation house on the property that is now the site of the Nashville Zoo
84	Benajah Gray Log House	Benajah Gray Log House	July 11, 1985 (#85001512)	446 Battle Rd. 35°59′36″N 86°37′31″W	Antioch	
85	Gymnasium, Vanderbilt University	Gymnasium, Vanderbilt University	February 23, 1972 (#72001233)	West End and 23rd Aves. 36°08′54″N 86°48′18″W	Nashville	
86	Hall-Harding-McCampbell House	Hall-Harding-McCampbell House	March 23, 2010 (#10000141)	305 Kent Rd. 36°09′32″N 86°39′43″W	Nashville	
87	Hays-Kiser House	Hays-Kiser House	September 10, 1974 (#74001906)	834 Reeves Rd. 36°03′55″N 86°40′20″W	Antioch	
88	Hermitage Hotel	Hermitage Hotel	July 24, 1975 (#75001749)	231 6th Ave., N. 36°09′47″N 86°47′01″W	Nashville	Designated a National Historic Landmark in 2020 for its role in the women's suffrage movement.
89	The Hermitage	The Hermitage	October 15, 1966 (#66000722)	12 miles (19 km) east of Nashville on U.S. Route 70N; 36°12′54″N 86°36′42″W	Hermitage	
90	Hillsboro-West End Historic District	Hillsboro-West End Historic District	December 23, 1993 (#93001435)	Roughly bounded by West End, 31st, Blakemore, and 21st Aves. and Interstate 440; 36°08′00″N 86°48′24″W	Nashville	
91	Holly Street Fire Hall	Holly Street Fire Hall	August 26, 1982 (#82003963)	1600 Holly St. 36°10′30″N 86°44′30″W	Nashville	
92	Holy Trinity Church	Holy Trinity Church	April 14, 1972 (#72001234)	615 6th Ave., S. 36°09′10″N 86°46′33″W	Nashville	
93	Home for Aged Masons	Home for Aged Masons	November 19, 2008 (#08001086)	Ben Allen Rd. and R.S. Gass Boulevard; 36°13′03″N 86°44′36″W	Nashville	
94	House of David Recording Studio Complex	House of David Recording Studio Complex	November 15, 2016 (#16000472)	1205-1207 16th Ave., S. 36°08′35″N 86°47′36″W	Nashville	
95	P. D. Houston Jr. House		October 27, 2003 (#03001081)	5617 Hillsboro Pike; 36°04′57″N 86°50′06″W	Forest Hills	
96	Hows-Madden House	Hows-Madden House	November 23, 1984 (#84000324)	U.S. Route 70; 36°05′32″N 86°59′02″W	Nashville	
97	Hubbard House	Hubbard House	August 14, 1973 (#73001760)	1109 1st Ave., S. 36°08′48″N 86°45′50″W	Nashville	
98	Hume-Fogg High School	Hume-Fogg High School	October 16, 1974 (#74001909)	700 Broad St. 36°09′34″N 86°46′55″W	Nashville	
99	Inglewood Place Historic District	Inglewood Place Historic District	March 22, 2016 (#16000117)	Golf, Greenfield, Howard, Jakes, Katherine, Kennedy, Kirkland, McChesney, Riverside, Shelton & Stratford Aves. 36°12′41″N 86°43′12″W	Nashville	
100	Jackson Park Historic District	Jackson Park Historic District	July 26, 2016 (#16000483)	Brush Hill Ct., Brush Hill Rd., Earlene, Kenwood, Riverwood & E. Riverwood Drs., Eastdale & Plymouth Aves. 36°13′14″N 86°42′41″W	Nashville	
101	Jubilee Hall, Fisk University	Jubilee Hall, Fisk University	December 9, 1971 (#71000817)	17th Ave., N. 36°10′08″N 86°48′17″W	Nashville	
102	Thomas P. Kennedy Jr. House		October 27, 2003 (#03001079)	6231 Hillsboro Pike; 36°03′21″N 86°51′31″W	Forest Hills	
103	Kenner Manor Historic District		May 26, 2016 (#16000118)	672-910 Clearview Dr., 700-722 Crescent Rd., 100-201 Kenner Ave., 200-313 Woodmont Cir. 36°07′08″N 86°50′19″W	Nashville	
104	Lakewood Commercial District	Lakewood Commercial District	May 24, 1985 (#85001556)	Roughly bounded by 22nd St. and Old Hickory Boulevard; 36°14′55″N 86°38′32″W	Lakewood	
105	Lebanon Road Stone Arch Bridge	Lebanon Road Stone Arch Bridge	May 13, 1987 (#87000379)	Over Brown's Creek at Lebanon Rd. 36°09′16″N 86°44′33″W	Nashville	
106	Lindsley Avenue Church of Christ	Lindsley Avenue Church of Christ	May 15, 1984 (#84003507)	3 Lindsley Ave. 36°09′08″N 86°46′07″W	Nashville	
107	Litterer Laboratory	Litterer Laboratory	January 9, 1978 (#78002581)	631 2nd Ave., S. 36°09′15″N 86°46′13″W	Nashville	
108	Little Sisters of the Poor Home for the Aged	Little Sisters of the Poor Home for the Aged	July 25, 1985 (#85001608)	1400 18th Ave., S. 36°08′26″N 86°47′44″W	Nashville	
109	Longleat		February 16, 1984 (#84003509)	5819 Hillsboro Rd. 36°04′37″N 86°50′27″W	Nashville	
110	Longview	Longview	January 12, 1983 (#83003027)	811 Caldwell Lane; 36°06′22″N 86°46′33″W	Nashville	
111	Hulda Margaret Lyttle Hall of Meharry Medical College	Hulda Margaret Lyttle Hall of Meharry Medical College	July 27, 1998 (#98000842)	1005 Dr. D. B. Todd, Jr., Boulevard; 36°10′02″N 86°48′18″W	Nashville	
112	Marathon Motor Works	Marathon Motor Works	January 4, 1996 (#95001482)	1200–1310 and 1305 Clinton St. 36°09′53″N 86°47′44″W	Nashville	
113	Dr. Richard and Mrs. Margaret Martin House	Dr. Richard and Mrs. Margaret Martin House	March 22, 2007 (#07000188)	825 Kendall Dr. 36°08′02″N 86°51′53″W	Nashville	
114	Richard E. Martin House		October 27, 2003 (#03001083)	30 Castlewood Court; 36°04′22″N 86°50′43″W	Forest Hills	
115	McCrory-Mayfield House	McCrory-Mayfield House	December 27, 1982 (#82001726)	1280 Old Hickory Boulevard; 36°02′31″N 86°49′41″W	Brentwood	
116	McGavock-Gatewood-Webb House	McGavock-Gatewood-Webb House	July 11, 2007 (#07000688)	908 Meridian St. 36°11′15″N 86°46′07″W	Nashville	
117	Mechanical Engineering Hall, Vanderbilt University	Mechanical Engineering Hall, Vanderbilt University	December 13, 1978 (#78002582)	Grand Ave. and 21st Ave., S. 36°08′50″N 86°48′00″W	Nashville	
118	Miles House	Miles House	January 8, 1979 (#79002424)	631 Woodland St. 36°10′25″N 86°45′38″W	Nashville	
119	Dr. Cleo Miller House	Dr. Cleo Miller House	August 25, 1995 (#95001045)	1431 Shelton Ave. 36°12′37″N 86°43′14″W	Nashville	
120	Morris Memorial Building	Morris Memorial Building	January 2, 1985 (#85000046)	330 Charlotte Ave. 36°10′01″N 86°46′49″W	Nashville	
121	Mount Olivet Cemetery	Mount Olivet Cemetery	November 25, 2005 (#05001334)	1101 Lebanon Pike; 36°09′02″N 86°43′58″W	Nashville	
122	Municipal Public Works Garage Industrial District	Municipal Public Works Garage Industrial District	November 29, 2010 (#10000949)	33 Peabody St. 36°09′28″N 86°46′06″W	Nashville	
123	Nashville Arcade	Nashville Arcade	May 22, 1973 (#73001761)	Between 4th and 5th Aves. 36°09′51″N 86°46′48″W	Nashville	
124	Nashville Children's Museum	Nashville Children's Museum	May 6, 1971 (#71000818)	724 2nd Ave., S. 36°09′15″N 86°46′05″W	Nashville	Originally the University of Nashville, Literary Department Building. Begun in 1853; architect was Major Adolphus Heiman of Nashville.
125	Nashville Christian Institute Gymnasium	Nashville Christian Institute Gymnasium	March 10, 2005 (#05000181)	2420 Batavia St. 36°09′40″N 86°48′47″W	Nashville	
126	Nashville City Cemetery	Nashville City Cemetery	October 18, 1972 (#72001235)	1001 S. 4th Ave. 36°08′51″N 86°46′12″W	Nashville	
127	Nashville Financial Historic District	Nashville Financial Historic District	March 20, 2002 (#02000232)	3rd Ave., N. and Union St. 36°09′56″N 86°46′42″W	Nashville	
128	Nashville National Cemetery	Nashville National Cemetery	December 20, 1996 (#96001516)	1420 Gallatin Rd., S 36°14′28″N 86°43′35″W	Nashville	
129	Nashville Union Station and Trainshed	Nashville Union Station and Trainshed	December 30, 1969 (#69000178)	Broadway and 10th Ave. 36°09′24″N 86°47′04″W	Nashville	
130	Newsom's Mill	Newsom's Mill	September 13, 1976 (#76001771)	West of Nashville on the Big Harpeth River; 36°04′49″N 86°59′47″W	Nashville	
131	Noel Hotel	Noel Hotel	October 10, 1984 (#84000090)	200-204 N. 4th Ave. 36°09′50″N 86°46′46″W	Nashville	
132	Oglesby School	Oglesby School	November 15, 2002 (#02001340)	5724 Edmondson Pike; 36°02′15″N 86°44′34″W	Nashville	
133	Old Hickory Historic District		May 24, 1985 (#85001555)	Bordered by Hadley Ave., Jones St., 8th St., Riverside Dr. and 15th Ave. 36°15′32″N 86°38′42″W	Old Hickory	
134	Old Hickory Methodist Church	Old Hickory Methodist Church	May 24, 1985 (#85001557)	1216 Hadley Ave. 36°15′28″N 86°38′52″W	Old Hickory	
135	Old Natchez Trace	Old Natchez Trace	May 30, 1975 (#75002125)	From the Alabama/Tennessee border to State Route 100 in Davidson County	Nashville	Extends into Hickman, Lawrence, Lewis, Maury, Wayne, and Williamson counties
136	Omohundro Water Filtration Complex District	Omohundro Water Filtration Complex District	May 13, 1987 (#87000380)	Northeast of Omohundro Dr. 36°09′43″N 86°43′23″W	Nashville	
137	Overbrook	Overbrook	March 29, 1984 (#84003511)	4218 Harding Rd. 36°07′55″N 86°50′35″W	Nashville	
138	Overton Lane	Overton Lane	July 17, 1980 (#80003795)	Kirkman Lane; 36°05′12″N 86°48′01″W	Oak Hill	
139	Park-Elkins Historic District	Park-Elkins Historic District	November 15, 2011 (#11000806)	Roughly along Park & Elkins between 42nd & 50th Aves. 36°09′02″N 86°50′32″W	Nashville	
140	The Parthenon	The Parthenon	February 23, 1972 (#72001236)	Centennial Park; 36°08′59″N 86°48′49″W	Nashville	
141	Peabody College for Teachers	Peabody College for Teachers	October 15, 1966 (#66000723)	21st Ave., S. and Edgehill Ave. 36°08′30″N 86°47′55″W	Nashville	
142	Pearl High School	Pearl High School	August 2, 2002 (#02000828)	613 17th Ave., N. 36°09′43″N 86°48′01″W	Nashville	
143	Thomas W. Phillips Memorial	Thomas W. Phillips Memorial	November 9, 2006 (#06001036)	1101 19th Ave., S. 36°08′44″N 86°47′52″W	Nashville	
144	Dr. Cobb Pilcher House	Dr. Cobb Pilcher House	October 27, 2003 (#03001082)	5335 Stanford Dr. 36°04′55″N 86°49′37″W	Forest Hills	
145	Primitive Baptist Church	Primitive Baptist Church	May 15, 1984 (#84003513)	627-629 3rd Ave., S. 36°09′15″N 86°46′19″W	Nashville	
146	Printers Alley Historic District	Printers Alley Historic District	August 26, 1982 (#82003964)	Roughly bounded by 3rd and 4th Aves., Bank Alley, and both sides of Church St. 36°09′51″N 86°46′43″W	Nashville	
147	RCA Studio B	RCA Studio B	July 10, 2012 (#12000420)	1611 Roy Acuff Pl. 36°09′00″N 86°47′34″W	Nashville	
148	RCA Victor Studios Building	RCA Victor Studios Building	July 21, 2015 (#15000445)	30 Music Square W. 36°08′59″N 86°47′35″W	Nashville	
149	Rainbow Ranch	Rainbow Ranch	November 27, 2018 (#100003154)	312 E Marthona Rd. 36°15′38″N 86°43′40″W	Nashville	
150	Rich-Schwartz Building	Rich-Schwartz Building	October 10, 1984 (#84000091)	202-204 N. 6th Ave. 36°09′47″N 86°46′56″W	Nashville	
151	Richland Hall	Richland Hall	September 1, 1983 (#83003028)	4822 Charlotte Ave. 36°09′08″N 86°50′45″W	Nashville	
152	Richland-West End Historic District	Richland-West End Historic District	April 16, 1979 (#79002425)	Roughly bounded by railroad tracks, Murphy Rd., and Park Circle, Wilson, and Richland Aves. 36°08′09″N 86°49′50″W	Nashville	
153	Riverwood	Riverwood	July 20, 1977 (#77001264)	1833 Welcome Lane; 36°12′N 86°43′W	Nashville	
154	James Robertson Hotel	James Robertson Hotel	October 10, 1984 (#84000092)	118 N. 7th Ave. 36°09′37″N 86°46′54″W	Nashville	
155	Robincroft	Robincroft	July 10, 1978 (#78002583)	746 Benton Ave. 36°07′58″N 86°46′35″W	Nashville	
156	Rutledge Hill Historic District	Rutledge Hill Historic District	July 8, 1980 (#80003793)	Roughly bounded by Middleton, 2nd, Lea, and Hermitage Aves. 36°09′19″N 86°46′09″W	Nashville	
157	Ryman Auditorium	Ryman Auditorium	May 6, 1971 (#71000819)	116 5th Ave., N. 36°09′39″N 86°46′44″W	Nashville	
158	St. Ann's Episcopal Church	St. Ann's Episcopal Church	November 18, 1983 (#83004237)	419 Woodland St. 36°10′18″N 86°45′56″W	Nashville	
159	St. Cecilia Academy	St. Cecilia Academy	December 12, 1976 (#76001772)	8th Ave. and Clay St. 36°11′13″N 86°48′04″W	Nashville	
160	St. Mary's Catholic Church	St. Mary's Catholic Church	July 8, 1970 (#70000609)	330 5th Ave., N. 36°09′57″N 86°46′53″W	Nashville	
161	St. Patrick's Catholic Church and Rectory	St. Patrick's Catholic Church and Rectory	May 15, 1984 (#84003516)	1219 2nd Ave., S. 36°08′39″N 86°45′51″W	Nashville	
162	Sandbar Village		July 22, 1994 (#94000749)	Both sides of the Cumberland River, northwest of Nashville; 36°12′20″N 86°53′52″W	Nashville	
163	Savage House	Savage House	January 11, 1983 (#83003029)	167 8th Ave., N. 36°09′39″N 86°47′01″W	Nashville	
164	Scarritt College Historic District	Scarritt College Historic District	August 26, 1982 (#82003965)	19th Ave., S. 36°08′46″N 86°47′48″W	Nashville	
165	Second Avenue Commercial District	Second Avenue Commercial District	February 23, 1972 (#72001237)	2nd Ave. between Brandon St. and Broadway; 36°09′50″N 86°46′35″W	Nashville	
166	Abner T. Shaw House	Abner T. Shaw House	March 28, 1985 (#85000671)	4866 Brick Church Pike; 36°18′53″N 86°46′38″W	Goodlettsville	
167	Shelby Street Bridge	Shelby Street Bridge	November 20, 1986 (#86003237)	Over the Cumberland River at Shelby St. 36°09′43″N 86°46′19″W	Nashville	
168	Smith Farmhouse	Smith Farmhouse	November 17, 1983 (#83004239)	State Route 100; also 8600 State Route 100, north and west of the original boundaries 36°02′07″N 86°58′52″W	Pasquo	8600 State Route 100 represents a boundary increase of June 24, 1991
169	Smith-Carter House	Smith-Carter House	November 29, 2018 (#100003155)	1020 Gibson Dr. 36°15′06″N 86°43′25″W	Madison	
170	Southern Methodist Publishing House	Southern Methodist Publishing House	September 13, 1984 (#84003519)	810 Broadway; 36°09′33″N 86°46′58″W	Nashville	
171	Stone Hall	Stone Hall	November 17, 2010 (#10000923)	1014 Stones River Rd. 36°11′16″N 86°37′58″W	Nashville	
172	Frederick Stump House	Frederick Stump House	April 2, 1973 (#73001762)	4949 Buena Vista Pike; 36°13′22″N 86°49′31″W	Nashville	
173	Sunnyside	Sunnyside	October 1, 1974 (#74001910)	3000 Granny White Pike; 36°07′09″N 86°47′20″W	Nashville	
174	Tanglewood Historic District		July 20, 1998 (#98000819)	4907, 4909, and 4911 Tanglewood Dr.; also 4905 Tanglewood Dr. 36°14′07″N 86°43′02″W	Nashville	4905 Tanglewood represents a boundary increase of March 19, 1999
175	Temple Cemetery	Temple Cemetery	May 12, 2004 (#04000440)	2001 15th Ave. N 36°11′09″N 86°48′41″W	Nashville	
176	Tennessee Manufacturing Company	Tennessee Manufacturing Company	June 25, 1999 (#99000759)	1400 8th Ave., N. 36°10′43″N 86°47′32″W	Nashville	
177	Tennessee State Capitol	Tennessee State Capitol	July 8, 1970 (#70000894)	Capitol Hill; 36°09′57″N 86°47′03″W	Nashville	
178	Tennessee State Library and Archives	Tennessee State Library and Archives	November 17, 2003 (#03001154)	403 7th Ave., N. 36°09′56″N 86°47′07″W	Nashville	
179	Tennessee State Office Building	Tennessee State Office Building	July 13, 2011 (#11000455)	6th Ave., N. & Charlotte Ave. 36°09′58″N 86°46′57″W	Nashville	
180	Tennessee State University Historic District	Tennessee State University Historic District	June 14, 1996 (#96000677)	3500 John A. Merritt Boulevard; 36°10′00″N 86°49′48″W	Nashville	
181	Tennessee Supreme Court Building	Tennessee Supreme Court Building	March 18, 2014 (#14000084)	401 7th Ave., N. 36°09′54″N 86°47′05″W	Nashville	
182	Tennessee War Memorial	Tennessee War Memorial	November 16, 2017 (#100001822)	301 6th Ave. N 36°09′51″N 86°47′02″W	Nashville	
183	Third Baptist Church	Third Baptist Church	October 31, 1979 (#79002427)	906 and 908 Monroe St. 36°10′30″N 86°47′43″W	Nashville	
184	Travellers' Rest	Travellers' Rest	December 30, 1969 (#69000179)	Franklin Rd. 36°04′37″N 86°45′49″W	Nashville	
185	Tulip Grove	Tulip Grove	February 26, 1970 (#70000607)	Lebanon Rd. 36°12′45″N 86°36′21″W	Hermitage	
186	Two Rivers	Two Rivers	February 23, 1972 (#72001238)	3130 McGavock Pike; 36°11′23″N 86°40′39″W	Nashville	
187	US Post Office	US Post Office	November 15, 1984 (#84000580)	901 Broadway; 36°09′28″N 86°47′02″W	Nashville	
188	U.S. Naval Reserve Training Center	U.S. Naval Reserve Training Center	July 6, 2011 (#11000419)	1515 Davidson St. 36°09′52″N 86°44′27″W	Nashville	
189	US Post Office-Old Hickory	US Post Office-Old Hickory	August 6, 1985 (#85002401)	1010 Donelson Ave. 36°15′49″N 86°39′02″W	Old Hickory	
190	Utopia Hotel	Utopia Hotel	March 26, 1979 (#79002428)	206 4th Ave., N. 36°09′50″N 86°46′44″W	Nashville	
191	Warner Park Historic Park	Warner Park Historic Park	January 20, 1984 (#84003528)	Roughly bounded by the Little Harpeth River, Belle Meade Boulevard, State Route 100, and Chickering Rd. 36°03′47″N 86°53′30″W	Nashville	Extends into Williamson County
192	Waverly Place Historic District	Waverly Place Historic District	March 28, 1985 (#85000676)	Roughly bounded by Beech, Douglas, and Bradford Aves., 10th Ave., S., and Acklen Ave. 36°07′51″N 86°46′56″W	Nashville	
193	Weakley-Truett-Clark House	Weakley-Truett-Clark House	April 13, 1989 (#89000297)	415 Rosebank Ave. 36°11′15″N 86°43′14″W	Nashville	
194	West End High School	West End High School	August 1, 2003 (#03000726)	3529 West End Ave. 36°07′54″N 86°49′26″W	Nashville	
195	West Meade	West Meade	March 4, 1975 (#75001750)	Old Harding Pike; 36°05′51″N 86°52′39″W	Nashville	
196	Whites Creek Historic District	Whites Creek Historic District	August 16, 1984 (#84003530)	Whites Creek Pike and Old Hickory Boulevard; 36°15′32″N 86°49′43″W	Whites Creek	
197	Whitland Area Neighborhood	Whitland Area Neighborhood	July 24, 2007 (#07000763)	Roughly bounded by Whitland Ave., Bowling Ave., S. Wilson Boulevard, and a tributary of Richland Creek. 36°07′45″N 86°49′44″W	Nashville	
198	Wilkinson House	Wilkinson House	November 29, 2006 (#06001095)	7663 Wilkinson Rd. 36°20′53″N 86°51′10″W	Joelton	Residence built in 1932, designed by architect Clarence Kelley Colley.
199	Woman's Club of Nashville (J.B. Daniel House)	Woman's Club of Nashville (J.B. Daniel House)	July 19, 2010 (#10000481)	3206 Hillsboro Pike; 36°07′06″N 86°48′32″W	Nashville	
200	Woodland in Waverly Historic District	Woodland in Waverly Historic District	March 25, 1982 (#82003966)	Roughly bounded by Interstate 65, 8th, Bradford and Wedgewood Aves. 36°07′54″N 86°46′38″W	Nashville	
201	Woodlawn	Woodlawn	November 21, 1978 (#78002584)	127 Woodmont Boulevard; 36°07′19″N 86°50′43″W	Nashville	
202	Woodmont Terrace Apartments	Woodmont Terrace Apartments	April 21, 2003 (#03000280)	920 Woodmont Blvd. 36°06′41″N 86°47′00″W	Nashville	
203	Young Women's Christian Association Building	Young Women's Christian Association Building	December 16, 1982 (#82001727)	211 7th Ave., N. 36°09′46″N 86°47′00″W	Nashville	

== Former listings ==
	Name on the Register	Image	Date listed	Date removed	Location	City or town	Description
1	DuPont Fire Hall		May 24, 1985 (#85001558)	December 10, 2002	1010 Hadley Avenue; 36°15′36″N 86°38′51″W	Old Hickory	
2	Evergreen Place		April 15, 1982 (#82003961)	March 26, 2008	1023 Joyce Lane; 36°14′01″N 86°43′33″W	Nashville	Demolished on September 22, 2005.
3	Fort Nashborough	Fort Nashborough	July 13, 2011 (#11000454)	November 24, 2015	Riverfront Park on 1st Ave. 36°09′51″N 86°46′32″W	Nashville	A replica of the original Fort Nashborough, built in the 1930s. Damaged in 2010 flooding. Demolished in June 2015.
4	Goodwill Manor		March 25, 1982 (#82003962)	October 11, 1994	3500 Centennial Boulevard; 36°09′52″N 86°50′24″W	Nashville	
5	The Hibbettage		October 30, 1998 (#98001305)	April 12, 2022	2160 Old Hickory Boulevard; 36°03′04″N 86°51′55″W	Nashville	Demolished in June 2020
6	J. S. Reeves and Company Building	J. S. Reeves and Company Building	February 1, 1972 (#72001543)	June 2, 1975	208-210 Public Sq.	Hickory	Also known as the Morgan-Reeves Building. Demolished in 1975.
7	Hatch Show Print Company Building		June 16, 1982 (#83003026)	October 11, 1994	116-118 4th Avenue	Nashville	
8	Shute-Turner House		September 11, 1997 (#97001138)	March 22, 2002	4112 Brandywine Point Blvd; 36°14′13″N 86°36′19″W	Nashville	House still exists. Removed due to alterations
9	Sudekum Building		December 19, 1979 (#79002426)	October 11, 1994	535 Church Street; 36°09′46″N 86°46′53″W	Nashville	
10	Treppard-Baldwin House		October 28, 1983 (#83004242)	October 11, 1994	3338 Whites Creek Pike; 36°14′00″N 86°48′54″W	Nashville	
11	Turner-Cole House		November 25, 1980 (#80003794)	December 5, 1986	2122 West End Ave. 36°08′58″N 86°48′11″W	Nashville	Demolished in 1986.
12	Westboro Apartments		November 10, 1988 (#88002607)	March 27, 1989	3101 West End Ave. 36°08′32″N 86°48′57″W	Nashville	Removed due to procedural error with the nomination.

== See also ==
- List of National Historic Landmarks in Tennessee
- National Register of Historic Places listings in Tennessee
