= Woodmont Terrace Apartments =

- U.S. National Register of Historic Places
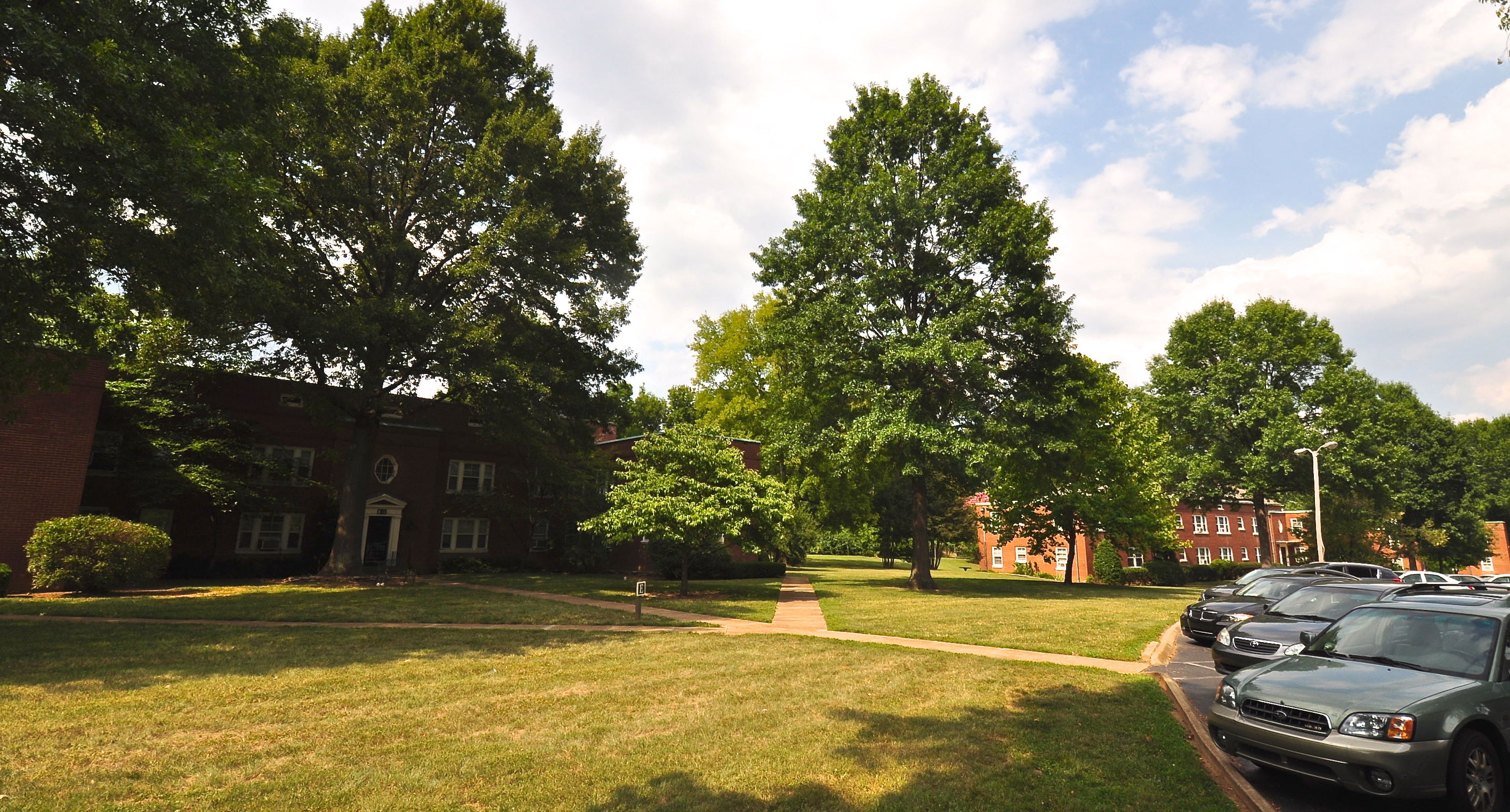
- The Woodmont Terrace Apartments in 2014

- Location within Tennessee Location within the United States
- Location: 920 Woodmont Boulevard, Nashville, Tennessee, U.S.
- Coordinates: 36°06′41″N 86°47′00″W
- Area: 11 acres (4.5 ha)
- Built: 1938-39
- Architect: Warfield and Keeble
- Architectural style: Colonial Revival
- NRHP reference No.: 03000280
- Added to NRHP: April 21, 2003

The Woodmont Terrace Apartments is a historic apartment complex in Nashville, Tennessee, United States.

== Location ==
The buildings are located at 920 Woodmont Boulevard in Nashville, the county seat of Davidson County, Tennessee.

== History ==
Construction of the eleven apartment buildings began in 1938, and it was completed within a year, in 1939. A year later, in 1940, an office building was built adjacent to the residential buildings. Two decades later, in 1965, five more apartments were added to the office building. By 1983, a gym and a swimming-pool were also added to the office building.

The seven two-storey buildings were designed in the Colonial Revival architectural style.

== Architectural significance ==
The original seven residential buildings have been listed on the National Register of Historic Places since April 21, 2003.
