= Berger Building =

- U.S. National Register of Historic Places
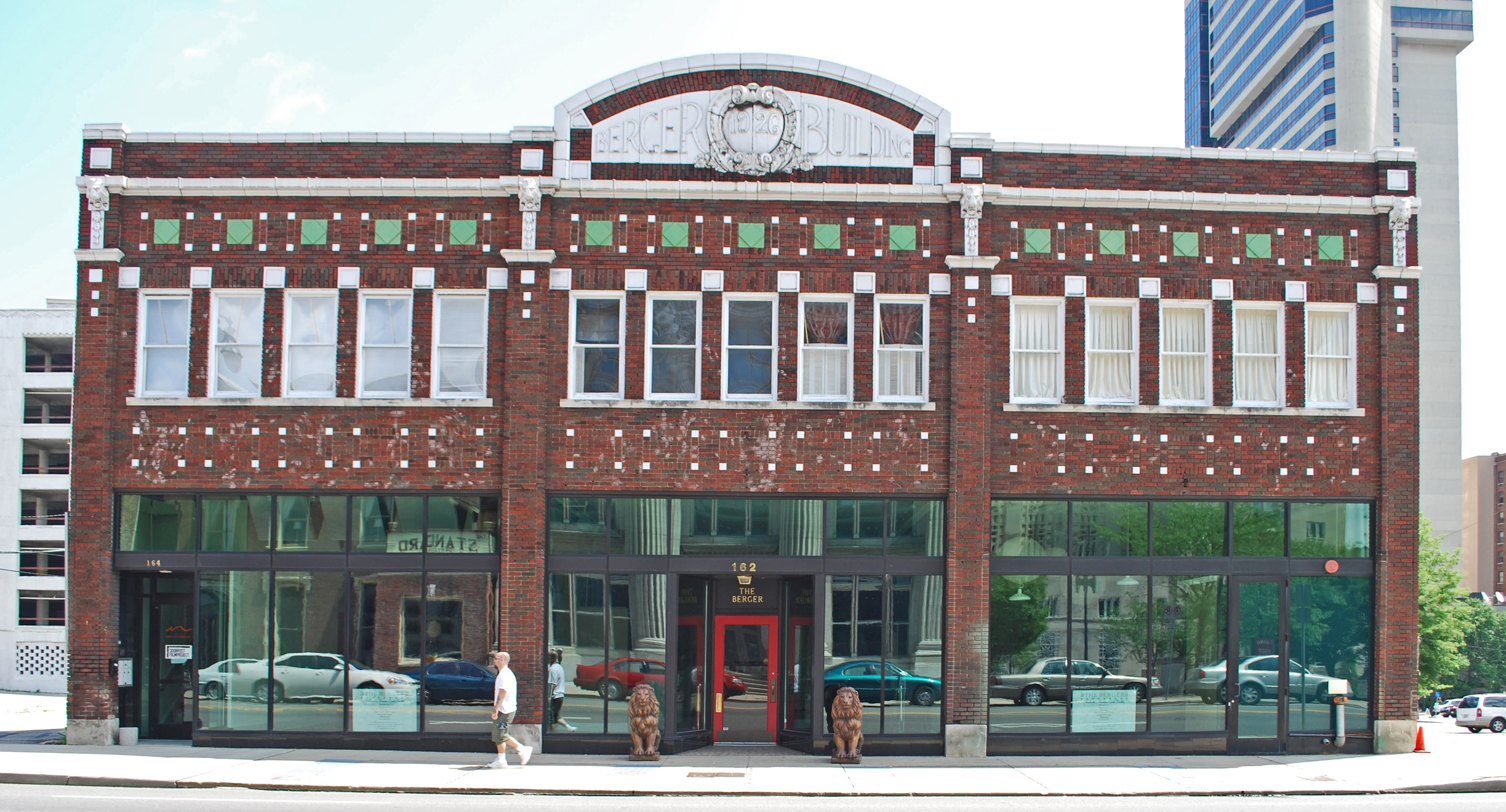
- The Berger Building in 2010

- Location within Tennessee Location within the United States
- Location: 164 North 8th Avenue (Rosa L Parks Blvd), Nashville, Tennessee, U.S.
- Coordinates: 36°9′38.8″N 86°46′58.8″W
- Area: 0.3 acres (0.12 ha)
- Built: 1926
- Architect: O. J. Billis
- Architectural style: Late 19th And Early 20th Century American Movements, Commercial Style
- NRHP reference No.: 84000376
- Added to NRHP: November 8, 1984

The Berger Building is a historic building in Nashville, Tennessee, USA.

== Location ==
The building is located at 164 North 8th Avenue (Rosa L Parks Blvd) in Nashville, the county seat of Davidson County, Tennessee. It is downtown.

== History ==
In 1925, Samuel Berger, a businessman, purchased the land as an investment. He hired architect O. J. Billis to design this two-storey building. It was completed in 1926, and Berger leased it to other businesses for commercial use.

When Berger died in 1934, the building was willed to Vanderbilt University. It belonged to the university for the next two decades, until they sold it in 1954.

== Architectural significance ==
It has been listed on the National Register of Historic Places since November 8, 1984.
