= Miles House =

Historic house in Tennessee, United States

- U.S. National Register of Historic Places
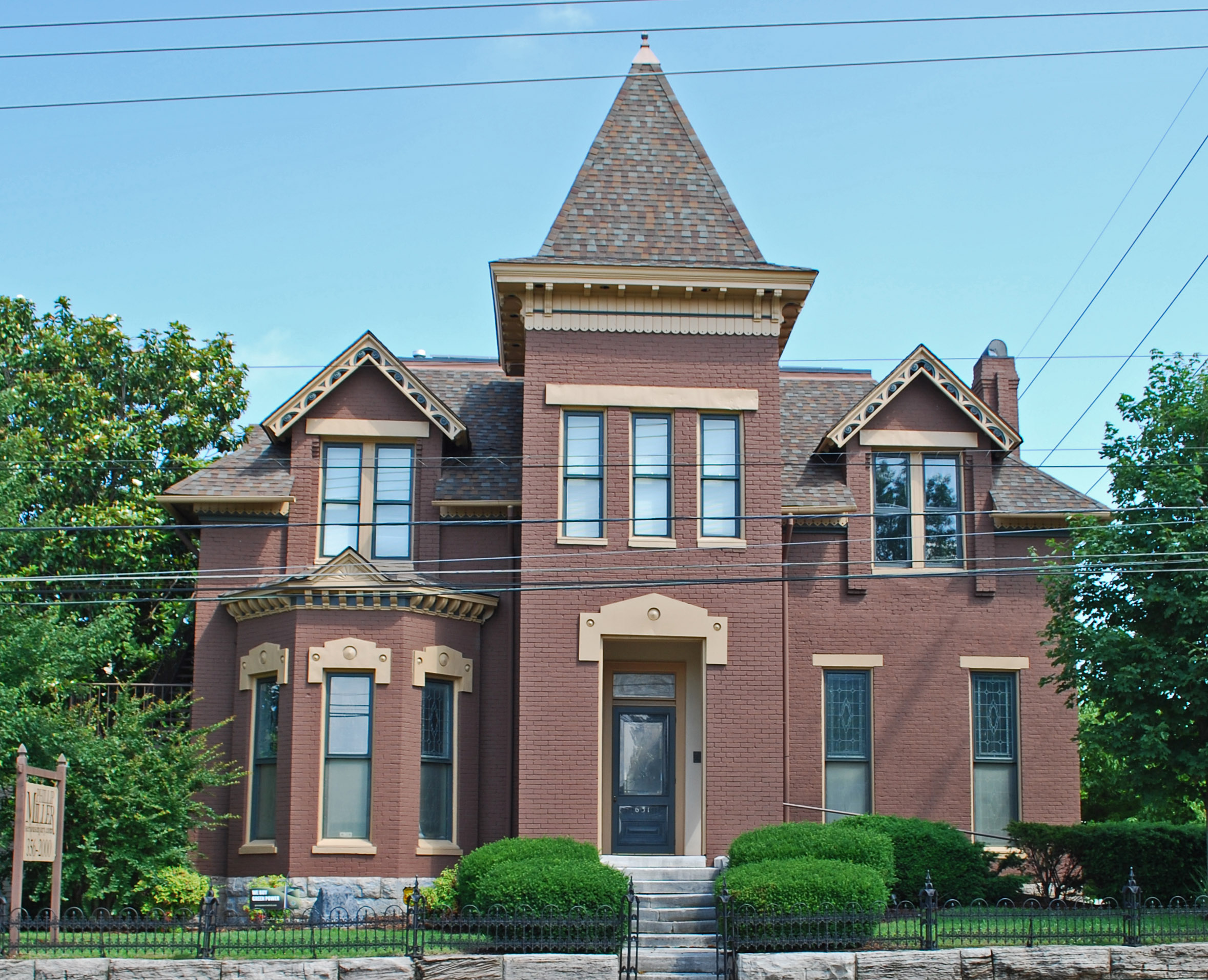

- Location within Tennessee Location within the United States
- Location: 631 Woodland Street, Nashville, Tennessee
- Coordinates: 36°10′25″N 86°43′14″W
- Built: 1860
- NRHP reference No.: 79002424
- Added to NRHP: January 8, 1978

The Miles House is a historic building located at 631 Woodland Street in Nashville, Tennessee It was added to the National Register of Historic Places on January 8, 1978. Since 1978 the Miles House has been cared for by Phillip Miller and is currently home to the Miller Law Offices.

== History ==
The Miles House has withstood Nashville's Great Fire of 1916 and a tornado in 1998. When first built prior to the civil war the building was a private residence, but was converted to a private girls school to serve the wealthy neighborhood of Edgefield.

== See also ==
- National Register of Historic Places listings in Davidson County, Tennessee
