= James Robertson Hotel =

- U.S. National Register of Historic Places
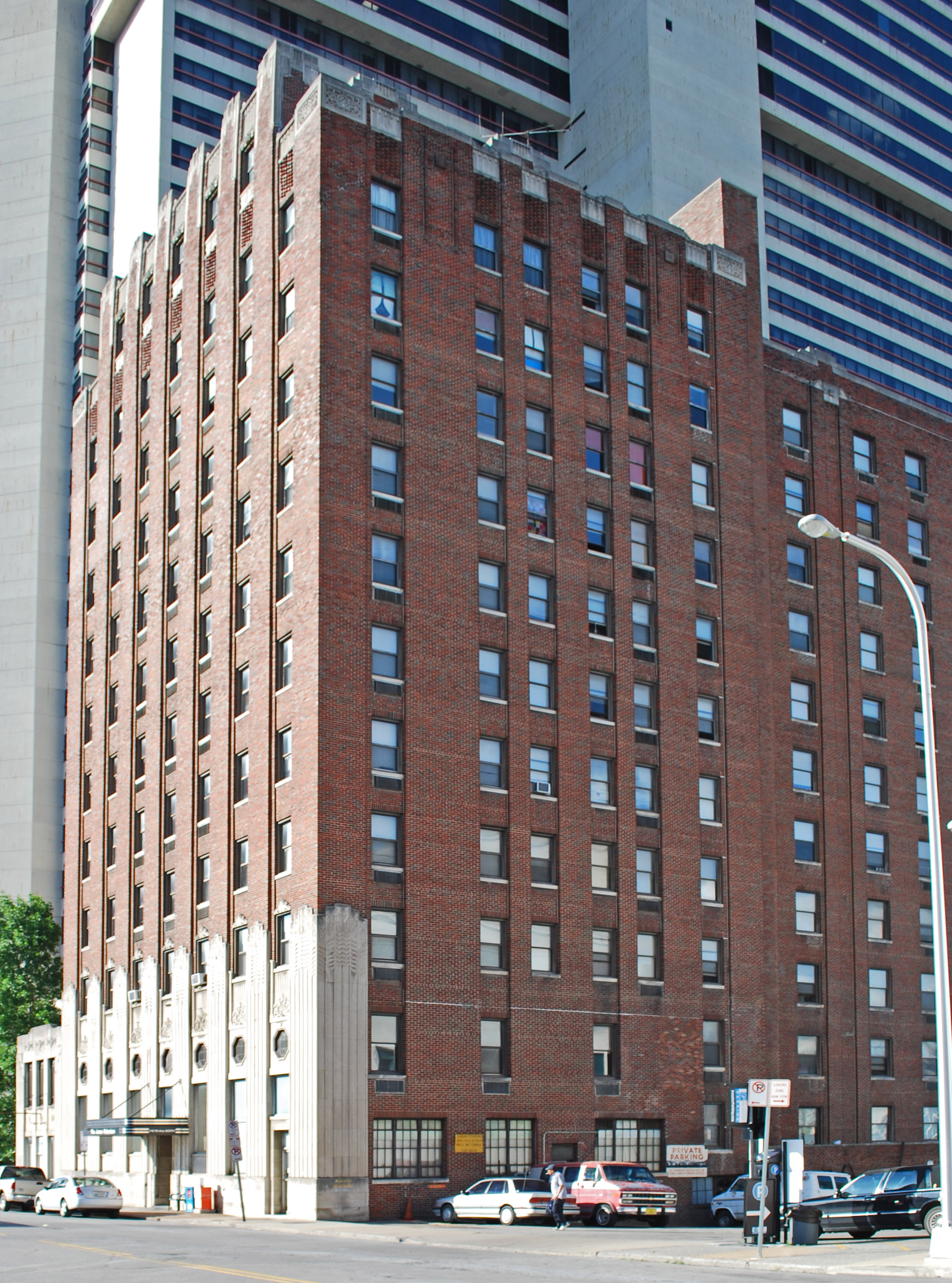
- The James Robertson Hotel in 2010

- Location within Tennessee Location within the United States
- Location: 118 N. 7th Ave., Nashville, Tennessee
- Coordinates: 36°9′37″N 86°46′54″W
- Area: 0.5 acres (0.20 ha)
- Built: 1929
- Architect: Marr & Holman
- Architectural style: Art Deco
- MPS: Marr and Holman Buildings in Downtown Nashville TR
- NRHP reference No.: 84000092
- Added to NRHP: October 10, 1984

The James Robertson Hotel is a historic hotel and apartment building in Nashville, Tennessee. It is located on North 7th Avenue at Commerce Street in Downtown Nashville.

It has been listed on the National Register of Historic Places since October 10, 1984.
