= Cartwright-Moss House =

Historic house in Tennessee, United States

- U.S. National Register of Historic Places
- Location: 760 Old Dickerson Pike, Goodlettsville, Tennessee, U.S.
- Built: c. 1810; c. 1850
- NRHP reference No.: 79002420
- Added to NRHP: August 1, 1979

The Cartwright-Moss House is a historic house in Goodlettsville, Tennessee, United States.

== History ==
The house was built as a log house by Jacob Cartwright, a settler, circa 1810s. It was expanded circa 1850.

== Architectural significance ==
It has been listed on the National Register of Historic Places since August 1, 1979.
