= Bush–Herbert Building =

- U.S. National Register of Historic Places
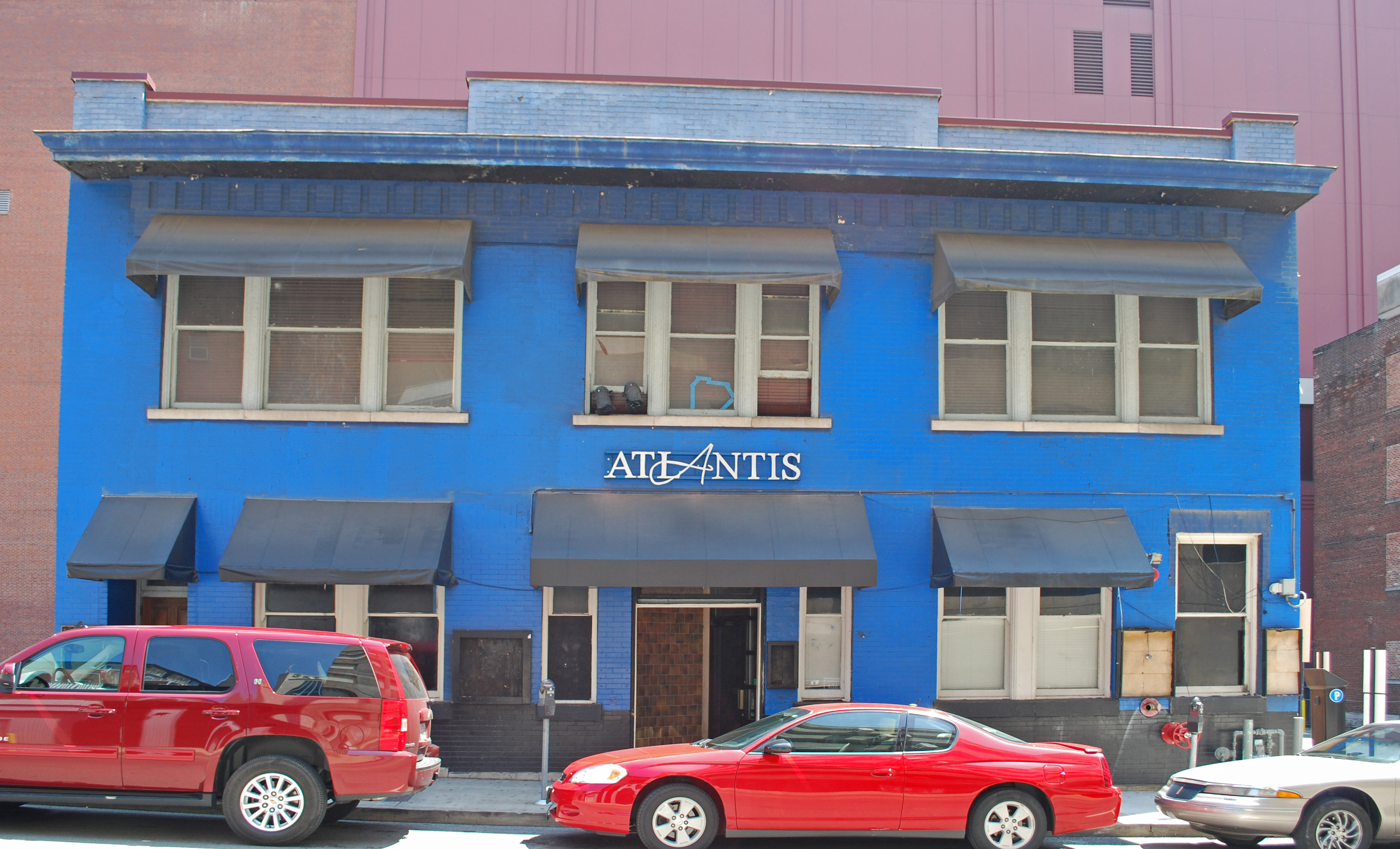
- The Bush–Herbert Building in 2010

- Location within Tennessee Location within the United States
- Location: 174 Third Avenue, North, Nashville, Tennessee, U.S.
- Coordinates: 36°09′50″N 86°46′38″W
- NRHP reference No.: 82003959
- Added to NRHP: March 25, 1982

The Bush–Herbert Building is a historic building in Nashville, Tennessee, United States. It was home to the Bush Brick Company (founded in 1867 by Confederate veteran Major W.G. Bush in 1867) and T. L. Herbert and Sons, from 1911 to 1961. The family business made bricks used for the construction of many buildings on the campus of Vanderbilt University as well as the Maxwell House Hotel, the Downtown Presbyterian Church and the Tulip Street Methodist Church. The building has been listed on the National Register of Historic Places since March 25, 1982.
