= Cole House (Nashville, Tennessee) =

Historic house in Tennessee, United States

- U.S. National Register of Historic Places
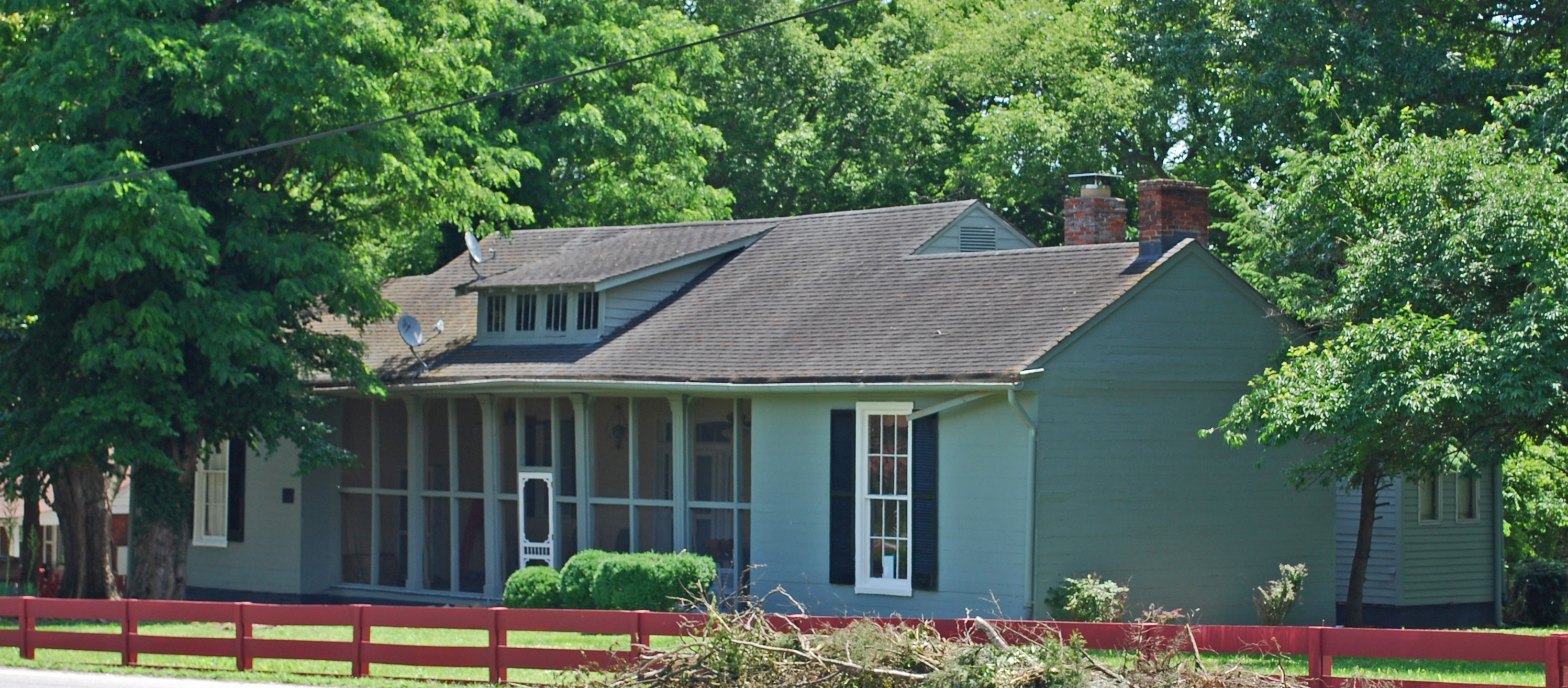
- The Cole House in 2010

- Location within Tennessee Location within the United States
- Location: 2001 Lebanon Road, Nashville, Tennessee
- Coordinates: 36°9′24″N 86°42′28″W
- Area: 3 acres (1.2 ha)
- Architectural style: Tennessee Vernacular
- NRHP reference No.: 74001907
- Added to NRHP: December 27, 1974

The Cole House is a historic house in Nashville, Tennessee. It has been listed on the National Register of Historic Places since December 27, 1974. The original portion of the Cole House at 2001 Lebanon Pike and shown on Wilbur Foster's 1871 Map of Davidson County, is reputed to have been constructed c.1859. According to local legend and family tradition, Edmund Cole constructed the front portions of this structure for his first wife who died in 1869. The house is significant as an example of early Tennessee vernacular architecture and is the only one of three Cole residence remaining.
