= Hows-Madden House =

Historic house in Tennessee, United States

- U.S. National Register of Historic Places
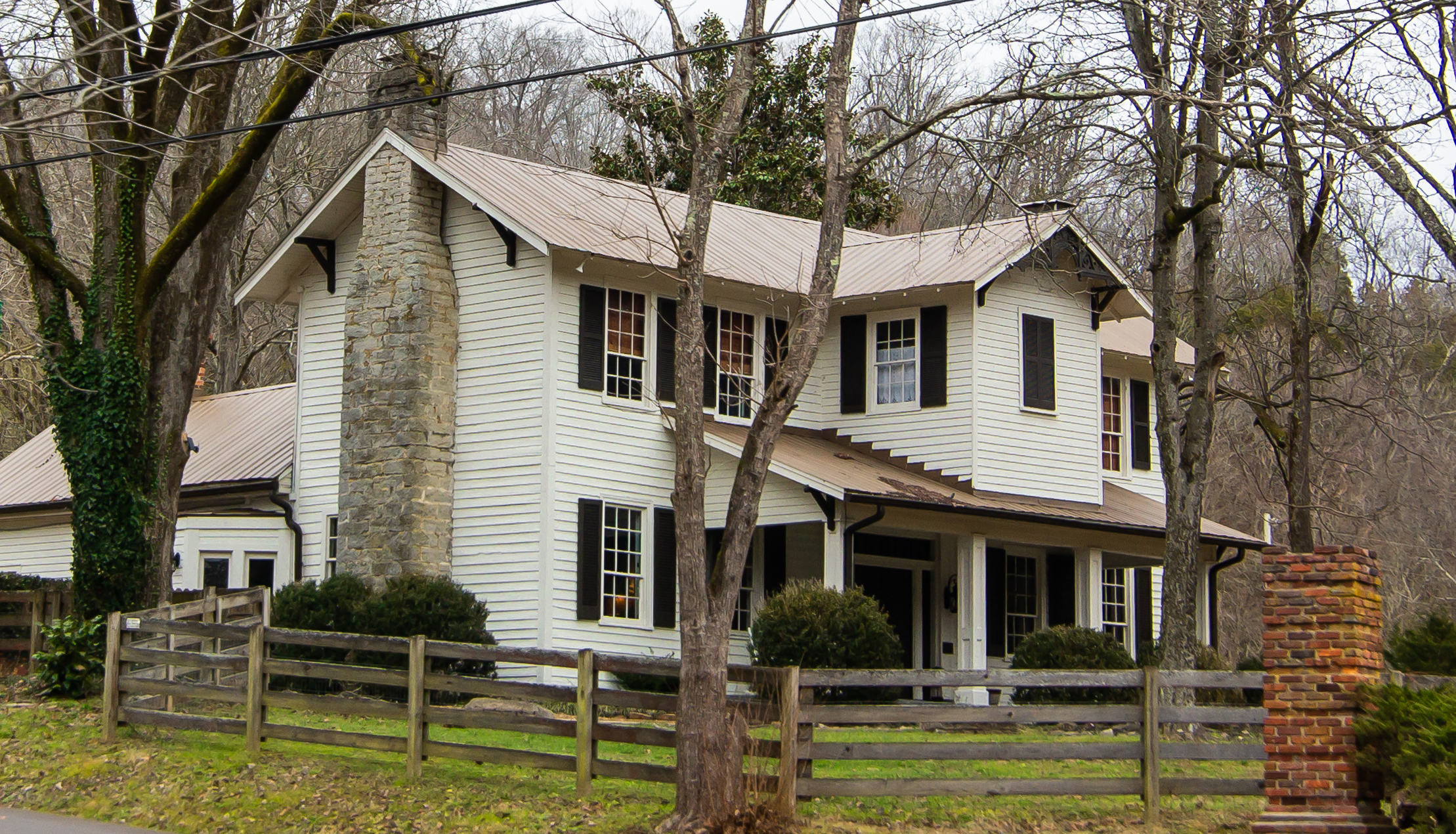
- Hows-Madden House

- Location within Tennessee
- Nearest city: Nashville, Tennessee
- Coordinates: 36°5′32″N 86°59′2″W
- Area: 1 acre (0.40 ha)
- Built: 1830
- Architectural style: I House
- NRHP reference No.: 84000324
- Added to NRHP: November 23, 1984

The Hows-Madden House is a historic mansion in Nashville, Tennessee, U.S.. It was built in 1830 for Rasa Hows, a settler and slaveholder. After he died in 1858, it was inherited by his widow and his sons, including Stephen Hows, who served under Nathan Bedford Forrest in the Confederate States Army during the American Civil War of 1861–1865. It has been listed on the National Register of Historic Places since November 23, 1984.
