= Devon Farm =

- U.S. National Register of Historic Places
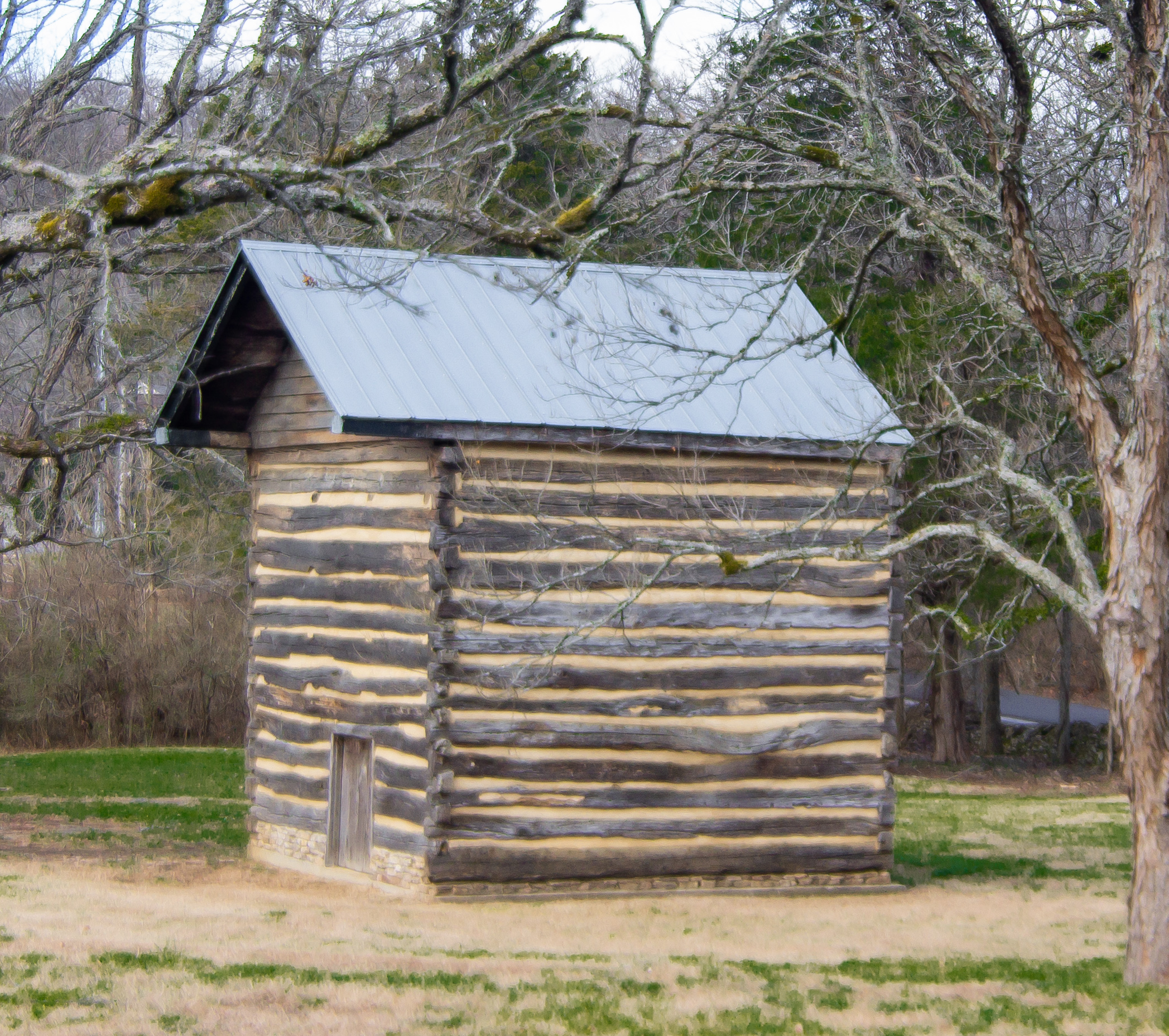
- Devon Farm

- Location within Tennessee Location within the United States
- Nearest city: Nashville, Tennessee
- Area: 30 acres (12 ha)
- NRHP reference No.: 74001908
- Added to NRHP: August 28, 1974

Devon Farm is a historic farm in Nashville, Tennessee, US. It has been listed on the National Register of Historic Places since August 28, 1974.

== History ==
The property was established as a 6,955-acre land grant by John Davis, a surveyor from North Carolina, in the 1790s. Davis built a red brick farmhouse. It was subsequently inherited by his daughter Fannie and his son-in-law, Morris Harding, in 1816. The couple lived on the farm for the next five decades, a period that included the American Civil War.

By 1865, the farm was inherited by Fannie Davis Harding's nephew, Edward Dickson Hicks II. Hicks imported Devon cattle from England, and he renamed the farm Devon Farm. It was later inherited by Edward Dickson Hicks III, who lived there with his wife Harriet Cockrill, the granddaughter of Mark R. Cockrill. By 1946, the farm was inherited by their son, Edward Dickson Hicks IV.
