= Fire Hall for Engine Company No. 18 =

Historic fire Station in Nashville, Tennessee

- U.S. National Register of Historic Places
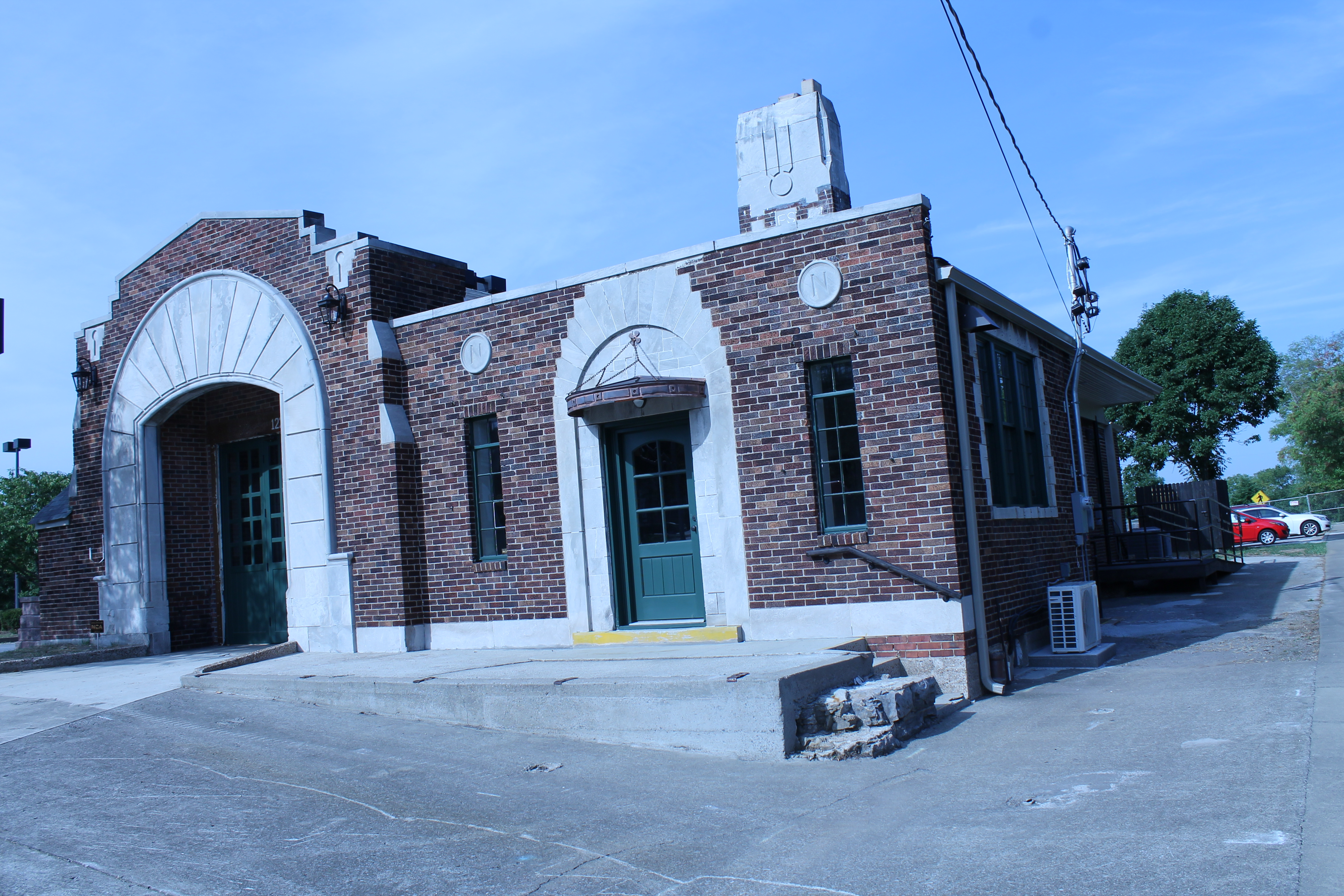
- Engine Company No. 18

- Location within Tennessee Location within the United States
- Location: 1220 Gallatin Ave Nashville, Tennessee 37206
- Coordinates: 36.161111°N 86.776389°W
- Built: 1930
- Architect: C.K Colley and Sons
- Architectural style: Tudor Revival architecture
- NRHP reference No.: 16000416
- Added to NRHP: May 13, 2016

Fire Hall for Engine Company No. 18 (1930) is a fire station in Nashville, Tennessee. It is listed on the National Register of Historic Places listings in Davidson County, Tennessee (NRHP) on May 13, 2016.

It is built in the style of Tudor Revival architecture.

== History ==
The building was planned in 1929 and an artist rendering of the building appeared in The Tennessean newspaper on October 3, 1929. It was designed by C.K Colley and Sons. The builder was W.R. Smith and Sons Company and there was a budget of $15,425. The building was operational in May of 1930 but it officially opened on Thursday, June 5, 1930.
