= East Nashville Historic District =

Historic district in Nashville, Tennessee

- U.S. National Register of Historic Places
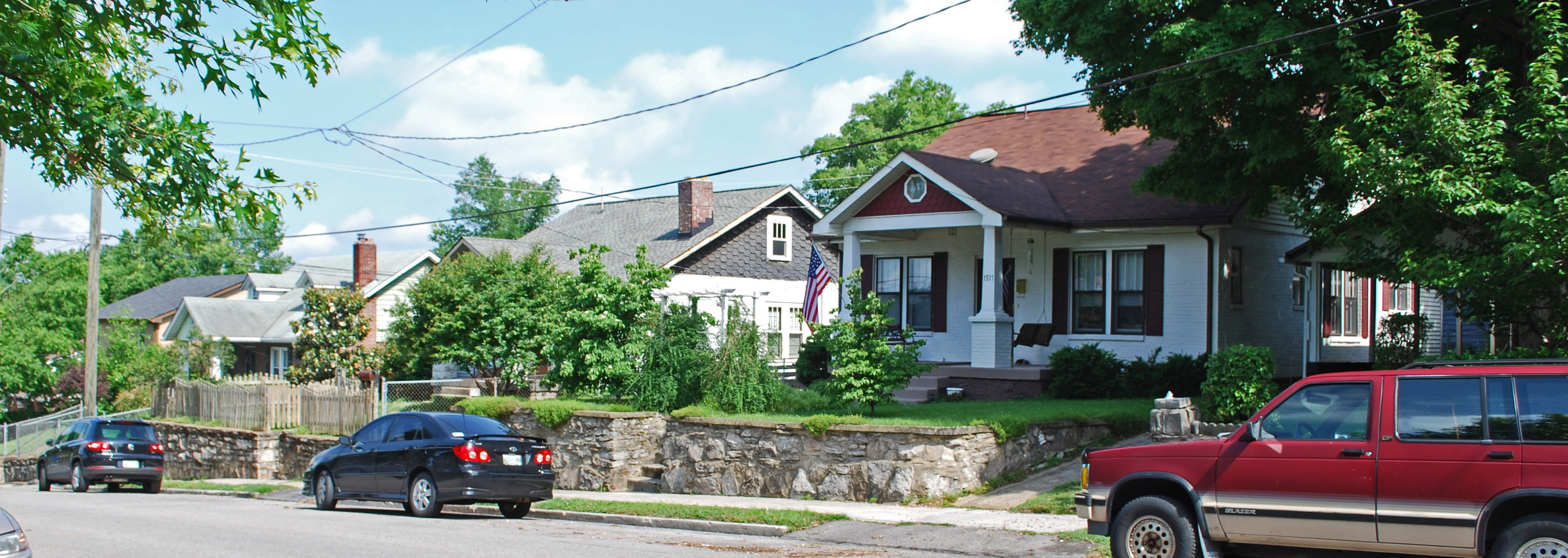
- Homes in East Nashville

- Location within Tennessee Location within the United States
- Location: Nashville, Tennessee
- Coordinates: 36.1775°N 86.745°W
- Built: 1800-1824; 1900-1924; 1925-1949
- Architect: Multiple
- Architectural style: Beaux-Arts architecture; Stick architecture; Eastlake architecture; Queen Anne style architecture
- NRHP reference No.: 82003960
- Added to NRHP: April 15, 1982

East Nashville Historic District is a historic neighborhood in East Nashville, Tennessee. It was listed on the National Register of Historic Places listings in Davidson County, Tennessee (NRHP) on April 15, 1982.

== History ==
The district is 2 miles east of downtown Nashville. The area was developed between the late 19th and early 20th centuries. Historically, it has been a middle class area. There are 352 buildings in the district and the majority of the buildings are single family homes. The district also has several churches a corner store and a school. There are 22 blocks: geographically the land is rolling terrain. The borders of the district are: to the north, East Land Avenue, in the south Fatherland Street, in the east South 16 and South 14 Streets, and in the west Gallatin Road.

== Architecture ==
Buildings in the district: late Victorian, Neoclassical, Bungalow and modern houses. There are Victorian buildings and also modest houses. Other architectural styles include Beaux-Arts architecture, Stick architecture, Eastlake architecture and Queen Anne style architecture.
