= Richland Hall =

- U.S. National Register of Historic Places
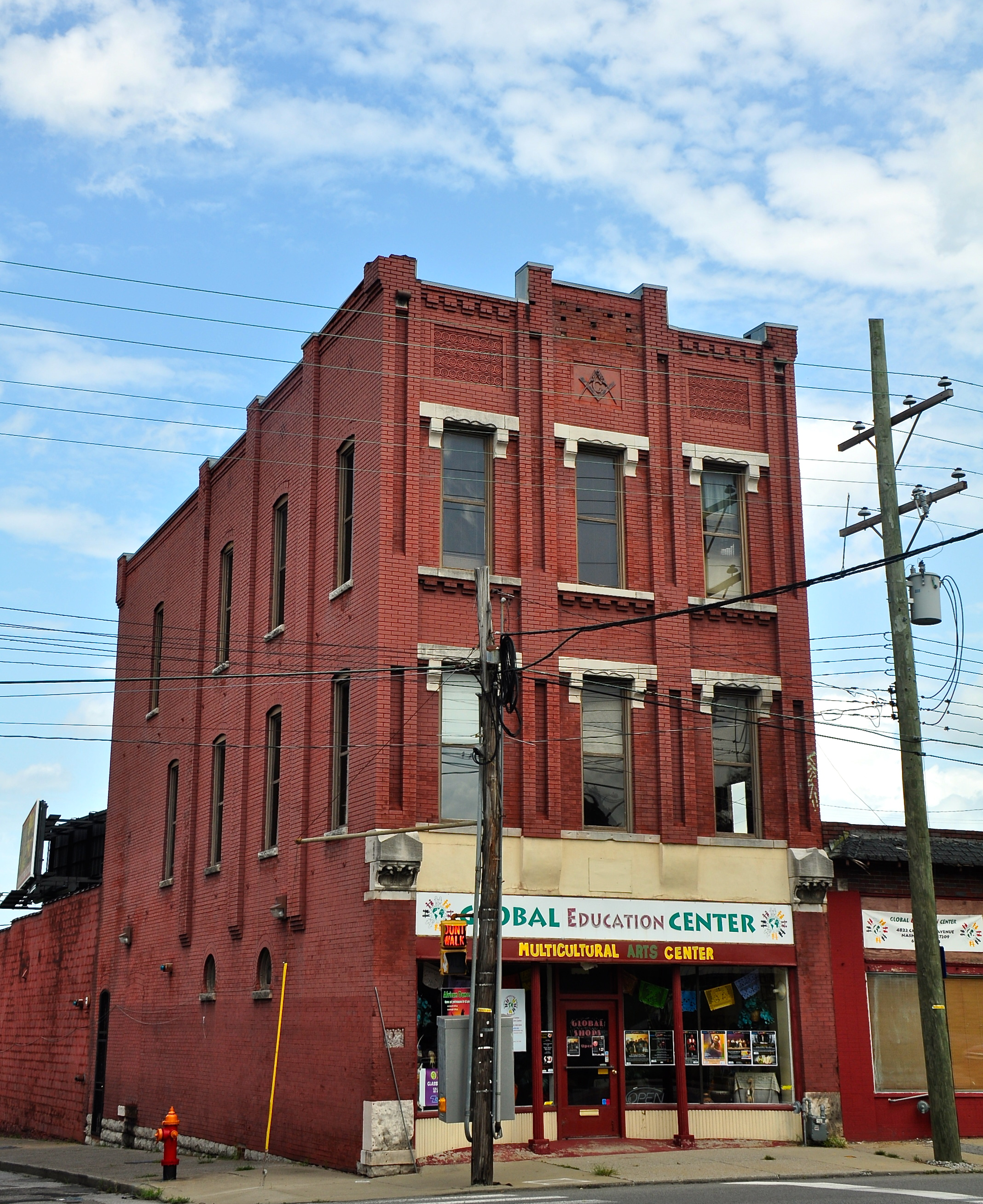
- Richland Hall in 2014

- Location within Tennessee Location within the United States
- Location: 4822 Charlotte Ave., Nashville, Tennessee
- Coordinates: 36°9′8″N 86°50′45″W
- Area: less than one acre
- Built: 1894
- Built by: Bowling, J. A. & Sons
- NRHP reference No.: 83003028
- Added to NRHP: September 1, 1983

Richland Hall is a historic building in Nashville, Tennessee, USA. It was completed in 1894.

== History ==
The three-story red brick building was completed in 1894. It was built by James A. Bowling, whose money came from the sale of prison farmland. The West Nashville Masonic Lodge was founded there in 1898. The building was used by the Freemasons from 1901 to 1915. In the 1920s, rooms on the third floor were rented as the Richland Hall Hotel.

The building was listed on the National Register of Historic Places in 1983.
