= Robert Chadwell House =

Historic house in Tennessee, United States

- U.S. National Register of Historic Places
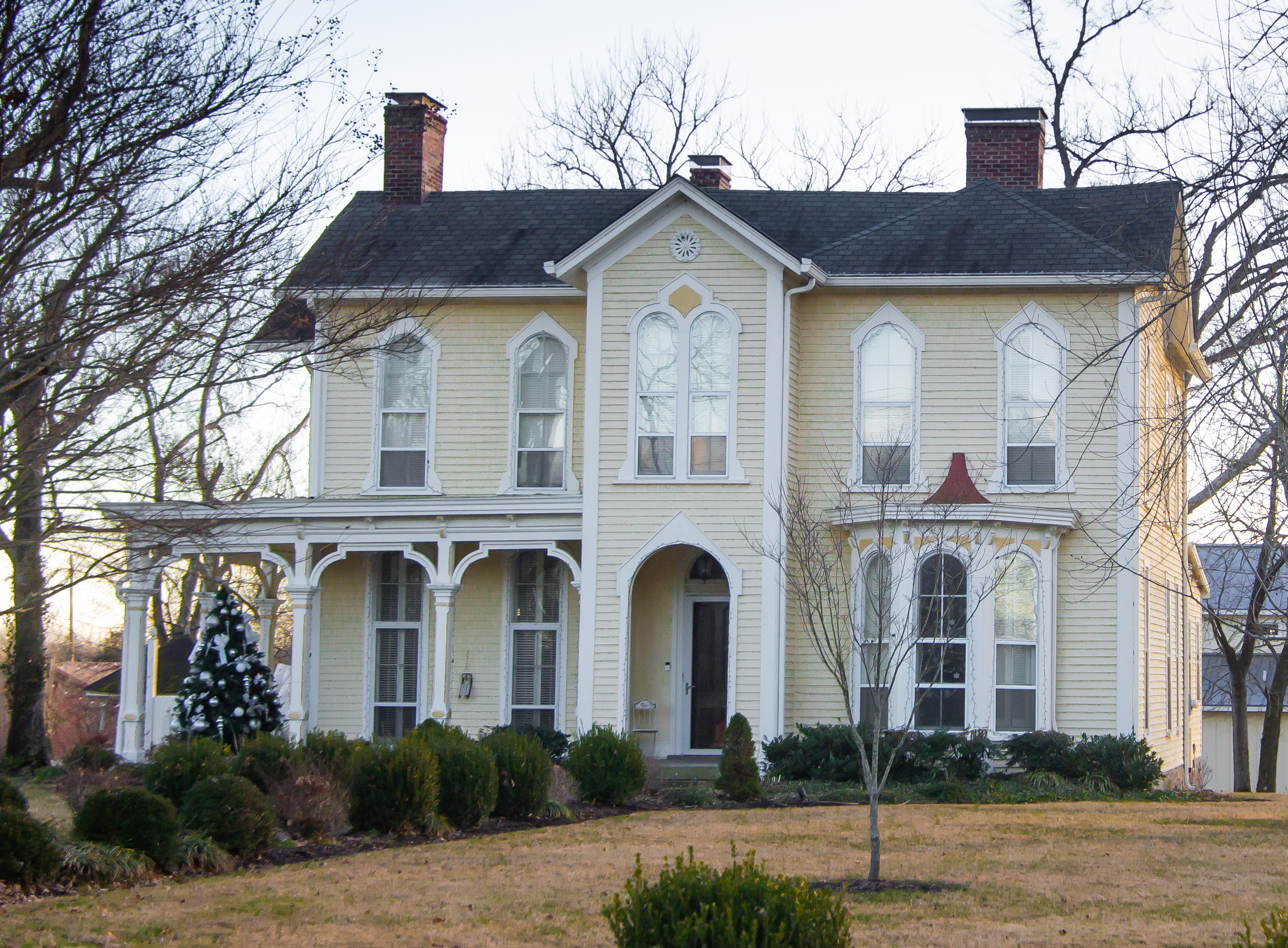
- Robert Chadwell House

- Location within Tennessee Location within the United States
- Location: 712 Neelys Bend Rd., Madison, Tennessee
- Coordinates: 36°15′9″N 86°41′48″W
- Area: 2 acres (0.81 ha)
- Built: 1874
- Architectural style: Italian Villa
- NRHP reference No.: 89001972
- Added to NRHP: November 13, 1989

The Robert Chadwell House is a historic mansion in Madison, Tennessee, United States. It was built circa 1874. It was designed in the Italianate architectural style. It has been listed on the National Register of Historic Places since November 13, 1989.
