= Overbrook (Nashville, Tennessee) =

Historic building in Nashville, Tennessee

- U.S. National Register of Historic Places
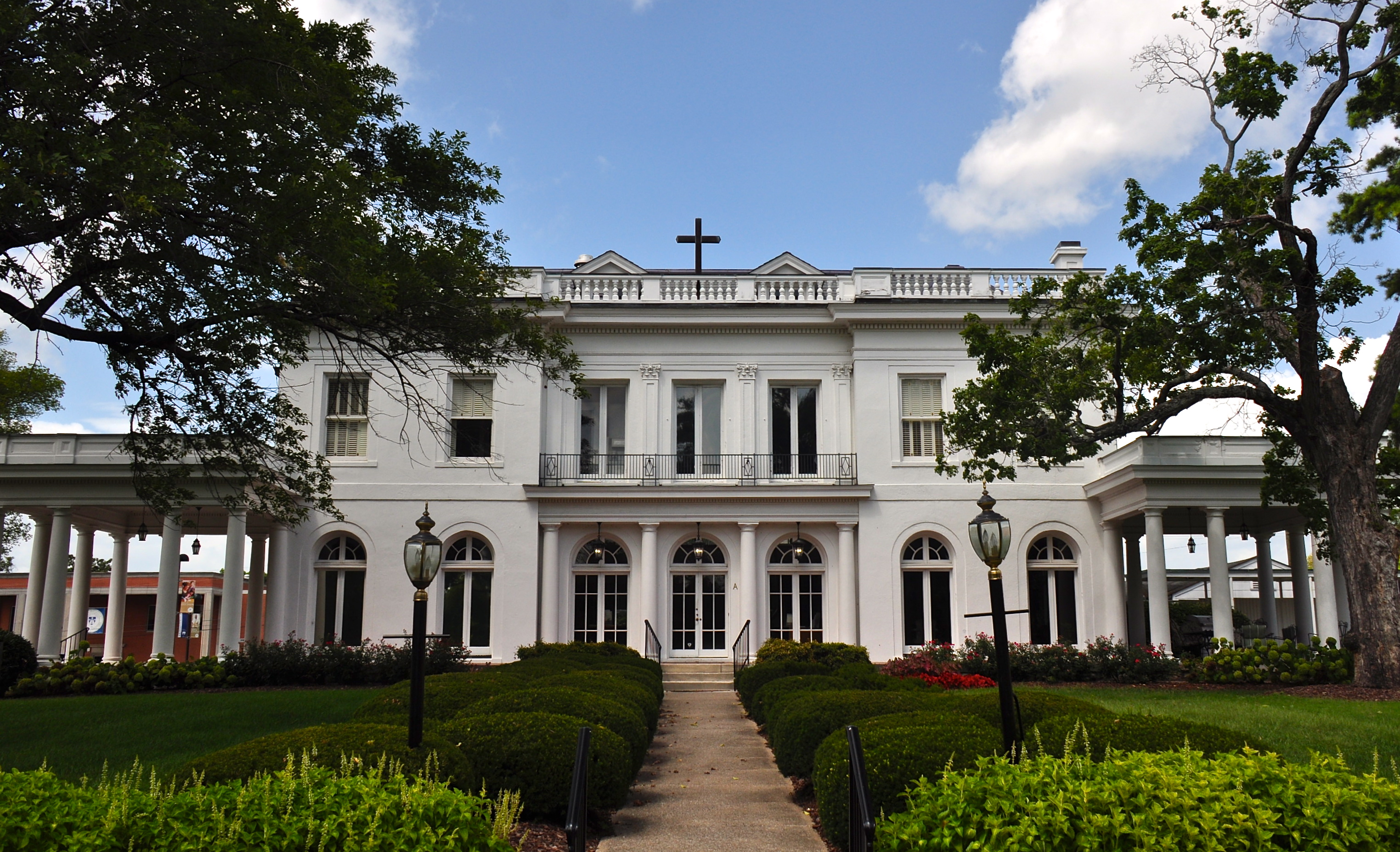
- Overbrook (2014)

- Location within Tennessee Location within the United States
- Location: 4218 Harding Rd. Nashville, Tennessee 37208
- Coordinates: 36.133333°N 86.8425°W
- Built: 1913
- Architectural style: Classic revival
- NRHP reference No.: 84003511
- Added to NRHP: March 29, 1984

Overbrook is a building located in Nashville, Tennessee. The building is now used by Overbrook School and two other schools operated by The Dominican Sisters of St. Cecelia. It was listed on the National Register of Historic Places listings in Davidson County, Tennessee (NRHP) in 1984.

== History ==
In 1913 Overbrook was constructed for businessman Joseph Warner. It was purchased by St. Cecelia Congregation of the Dominican Sisters in 1923. For a time the building was rented out. In 1927 the building was then rented out for $150 a month. In 1928 it was rented by Mr. and Mrs. Paul M. Davis: they lived in the building while they rebuilt their fire damaged home. In 1936 it became a Catholic elementary school called "Overbrook School". The Dominican Sisters of St. Cecelia now run three private schools on the property.

The building was added to the National Register of Historic Places listings in Davidson County, Tennessee (NRHP) on March 29, 1984.

== Description ==
The building is situated on a 96 acres (39 ha) property which features Kingfisher Creek - which is where the "brook" in the name "Overbrook" came from. The building is a Neo-Classical style building which is 8,700 ft (2,700 m). Then home is covered in stucco and it is an L-shaped brick building. The 1913 news article in The Tennessean described a hall and the "Adams room" (drawing room) finished in Italian marble and white mahogany. The home also had French and English wallpaper and Persian tapestries throughout. The second level's floors were covered in white enamel, and there is mahogany woodwork. There was also a spring house on site with a water plant, garages and servants' houses.
