= J.B. Daniel House =

Historic house in Tennessee, United States

- Woman's Club of Nashville (J.B. Daniel House)
- U.S. National Register of Historic Places
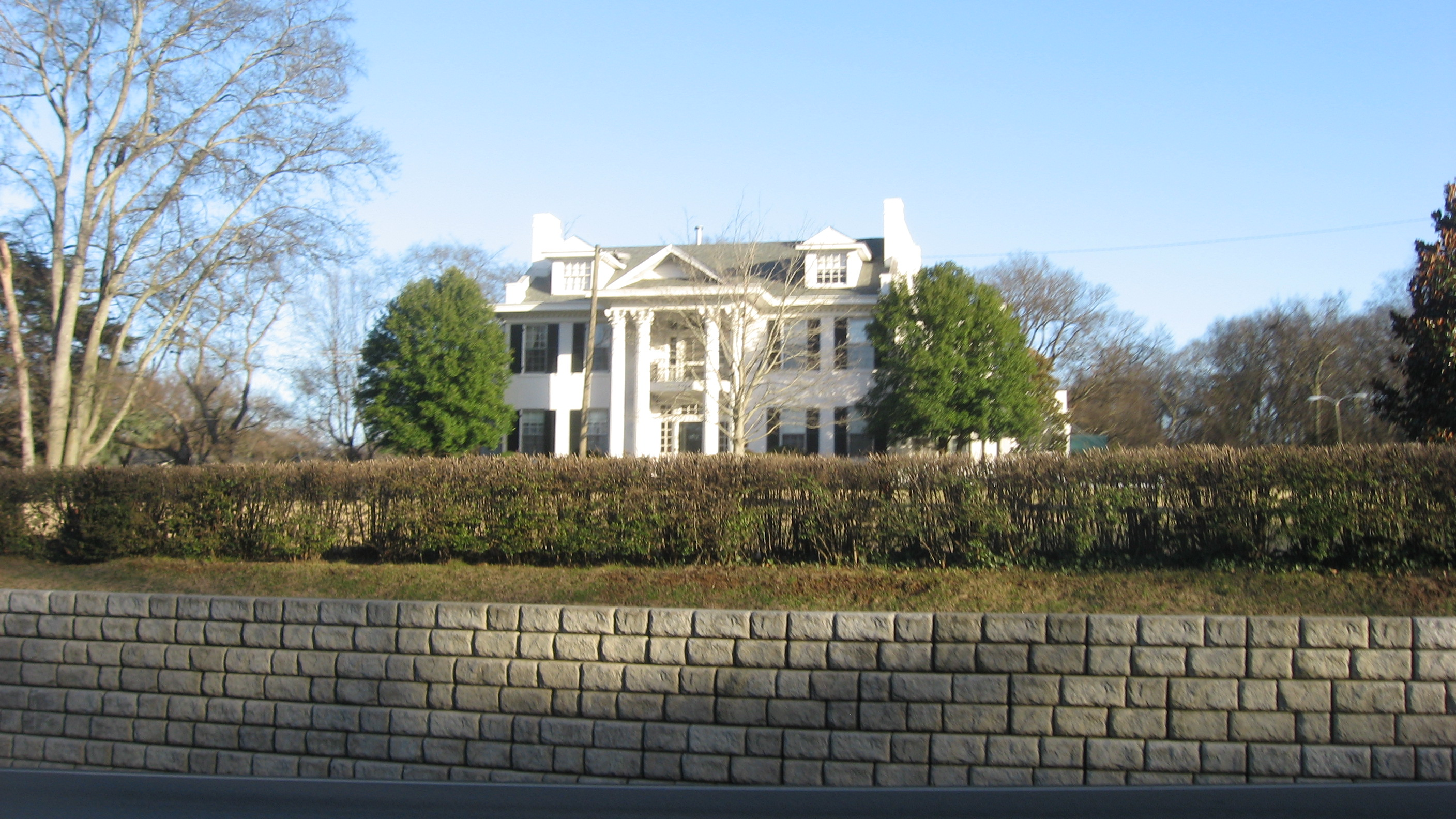
- The J.B. Daniel House in 2014

- Location within Tennessee Location within the United States
- Location: 3206 Hillsboro Pike, Nashville, Tennessee, U.S.
- Coordinates: 36.118333°N 86.808889°W
- NRHP reference No.: 10000481
- Added to NRHP: July 19, 2010

The J.B. Daniel House is a historic mansion in Nashville, Tennessee, United States. It is home to the Woman's Club of Nashville. It has been listed on the National Register of Historic Places since July 19, 2010.

== See also ==
- National Register of Historic Places listings in Davidson County, Tennessee
