= Tennessee Manufacturing Company =

Coordinates: 36.17839°N 86.79450°W

- U.S. National Register of Historic Places
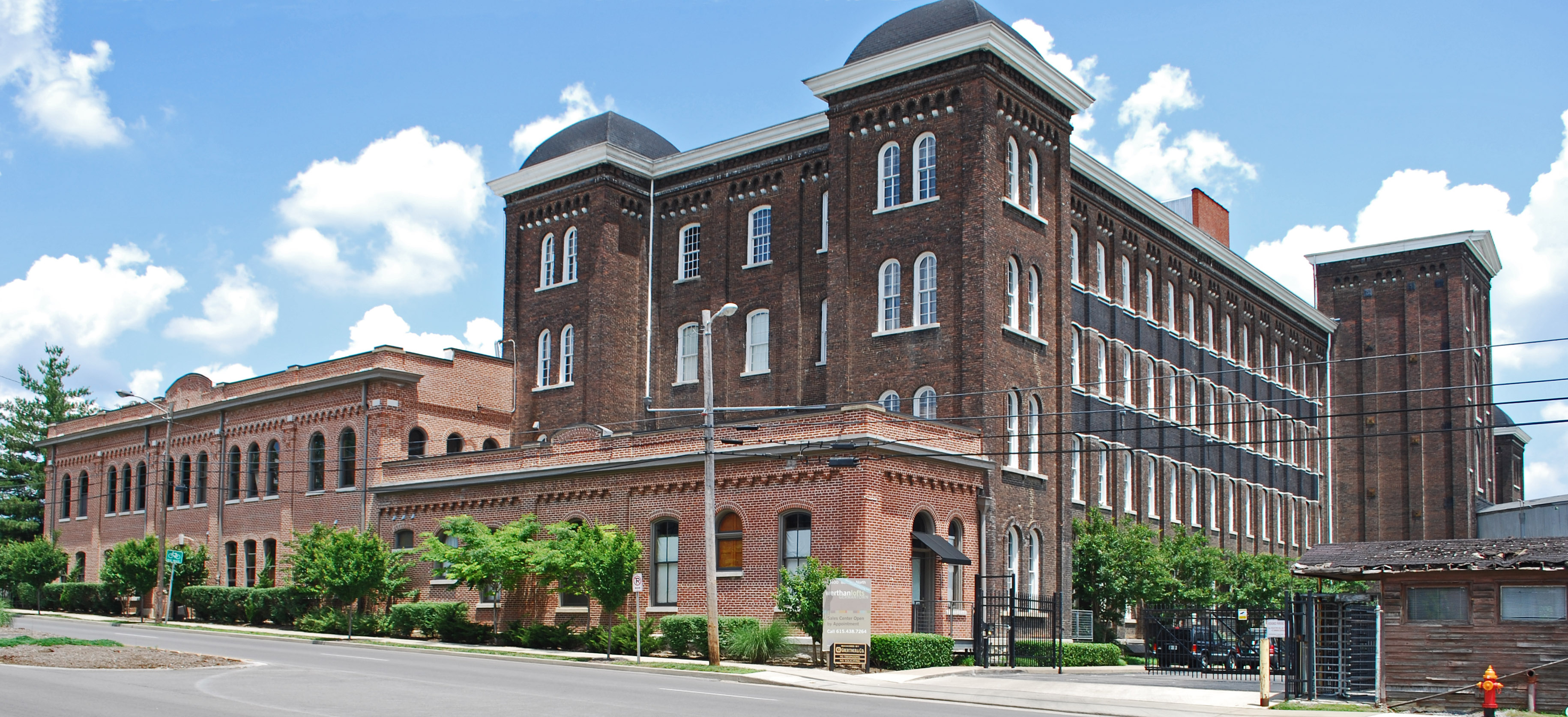
- The Tennessee Manufacturing Company in 2010

- Location within Tennessee Location within the United States
- Location: 1400 Eighth Ave., N, Nashville, Tennessee
- Area: 20.5 acres (8.3 ha)
- Built: 1871
- Architectural style: Italianate, 20th Century Industrial
- NRHP reference No.: 99000759
- Added to NRHP: June 25, 1999

The Tennessee Manufacturing Company is a complex of six historic buildings in Nashville, Tennessee, USA. They were built from 1869 to 1953. The company was founded by Samuel Morgan. The buildings have been listed on the National Register of Historic Places since June 25, 1999.
