= Thomas W. Phillips Memorial =

- Phillips, Thomas W., Memorial
- U.S. National Register of Historic Places
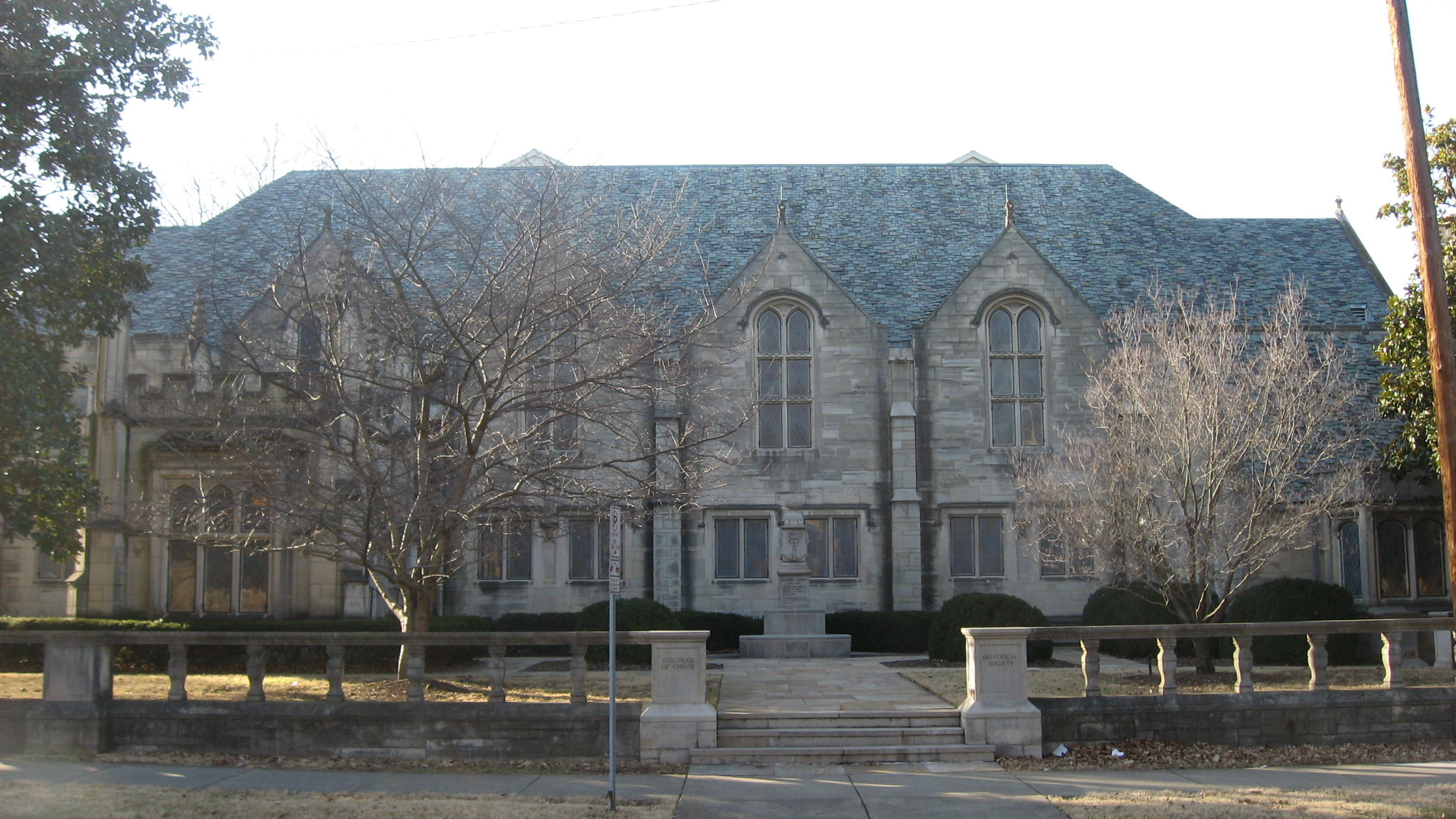
- The Thomas W. Phillips Memorial in 2014

- Location within Tennessee
- Location: 1101 19th Avenue South, Nashville, Tennessee
- Coordinates: 36°8′50″N 86°47′52″W
- Area: 0.6 acres (0.24 ha)
- Built: 1956
- Architectural style: Late Gothic Revival
- NRHP reference No.: 06001036
- Added to NRHP: November 9, 2006

The Thomas W. Phillips Memorial is a historic building in Nashville, Tennessee, United States, owned by Vanderbilt University. It was home to the Disciples of Christ Historical Society until the building was purchased by Vanderbilt in 2015. It was built in 1956. It has been listed on the National Register of Historic Places since November 9, 2006.
