= Robincroft =

Historic house in Tennessee, United States

- U.S. National Register of Historic Places
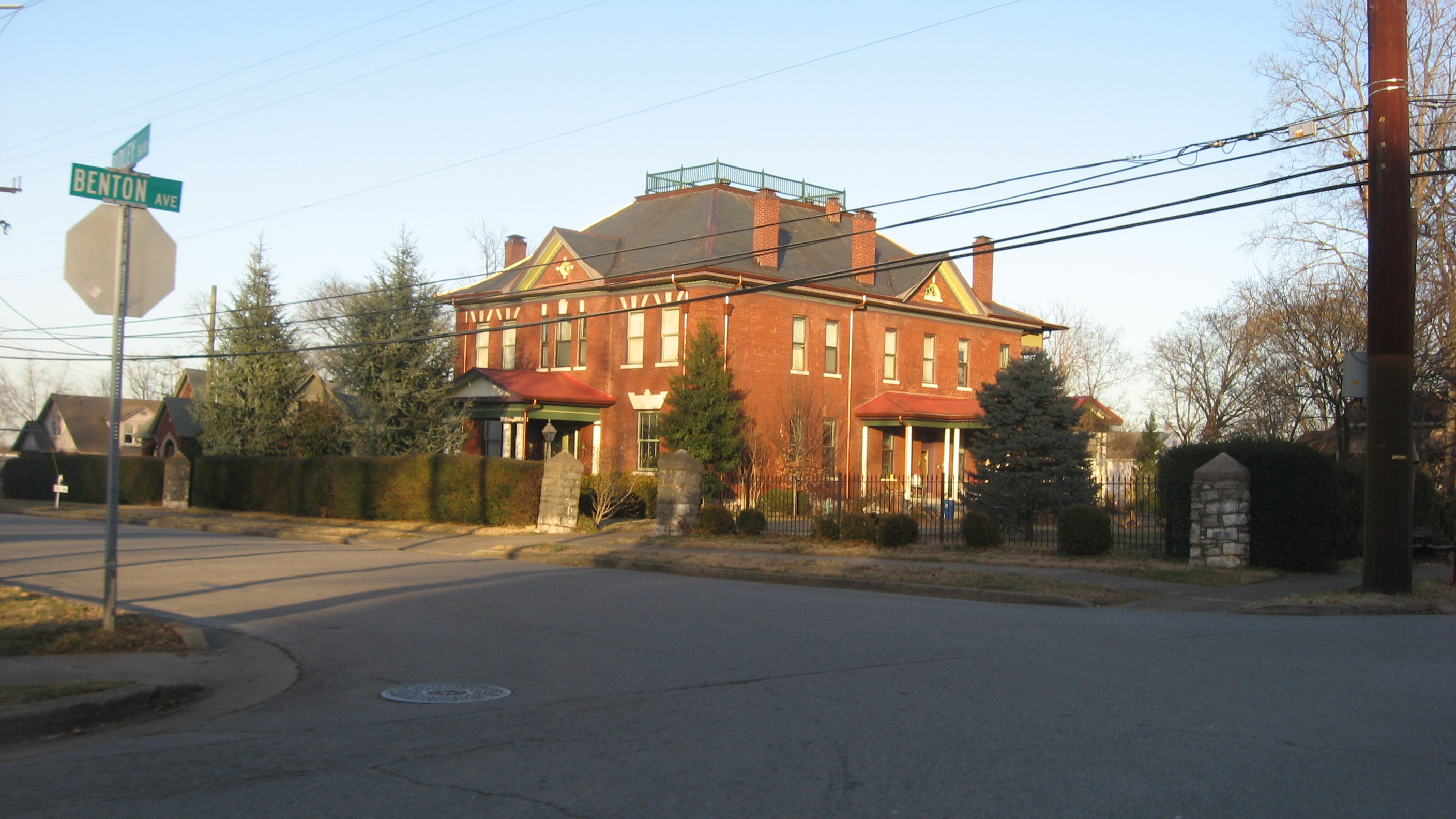
- Robincroft in 2014

- Location within Tennessee
- Location: 746 Benton Ave., Nashville, Tennessee
- Coordinates: 36°7′57″N 86°46′39″W
- Area: 0.5 acres (0.20 ha)
- Built: 1908
- NRHP reference No.: 78002583
- Added to NRHP: July 10, 1978

Robincroft is a historic mansion in Nashville, Tennessee, U.S.. It was built in 1908 for Thomas M. Robinson, the owner of the Robinson McGill Carriage Company, a baby carriage company. It has been listed on the National Register of Historic Places since July 10, 1978.
