= Abner T. Shaw House =

Historic house in Tennessee, United States

- U.S. National Register of Historic Places
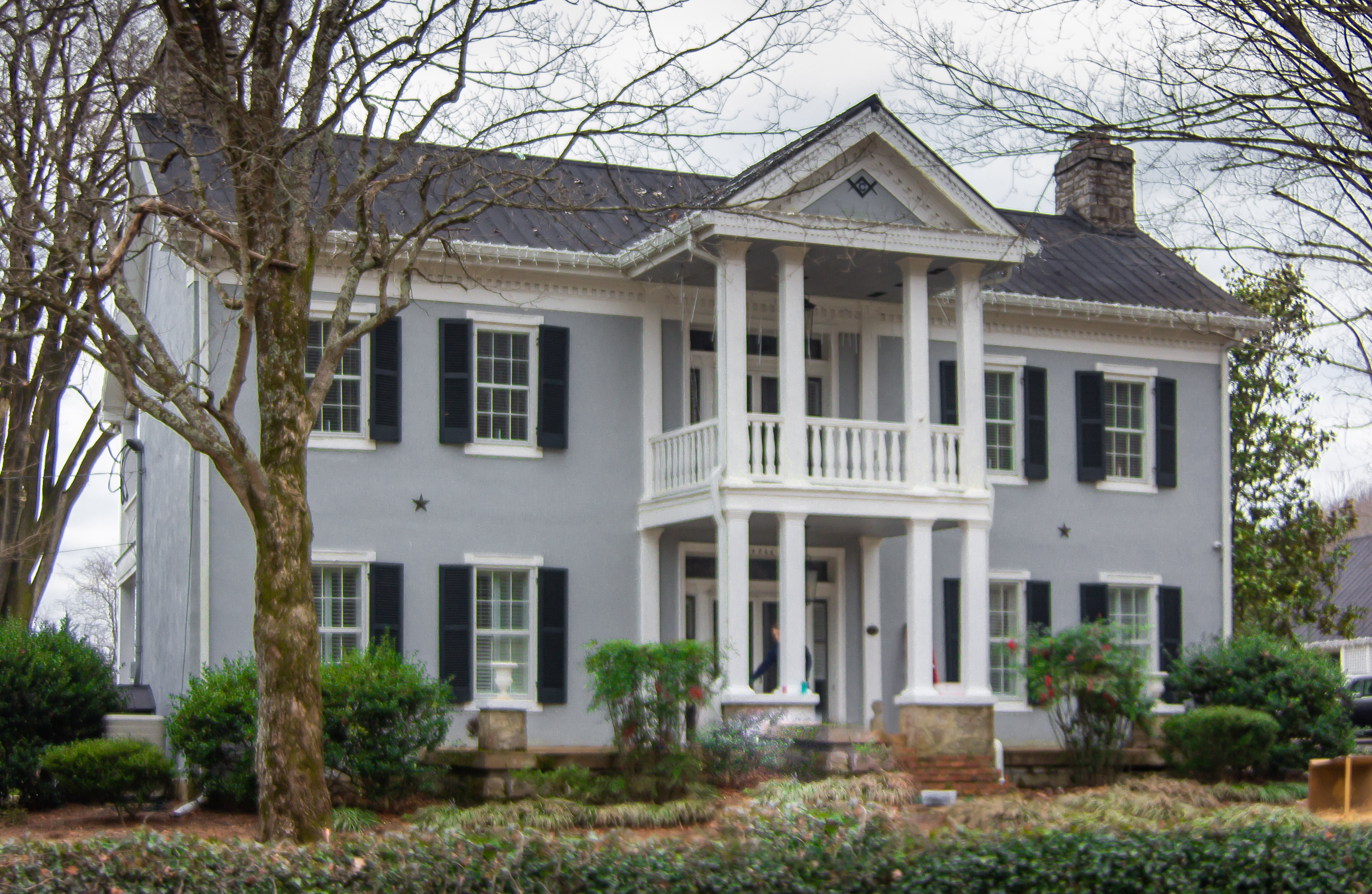
- Abner T. Shaw House

- Location within Tennessee
- Location: 4866 Brick Church Pike
- Nearest city: Goodlettsville, Tennessee
- Coordinates: 36°18′53″N 86°46′38″W
- Area: 3 acres (1.2 ha)
- Built: 1855
- Architect: Abner T. Shaw
- Architectural style: Greek Revival, Vernacular Greek Revival
- NRHP reference No.: 85000671
- Added to NRHP: March 28, 1985

The Abner T. Shaw House is a historic mansion in Goodlettsville, Tennessee, U.S. that was built in 1855. It was designed in the Greek Revival architectural style. During the American Civil War of 1861–1865, the house was not burnt down by the Union Army because both Shaw and the Union general were Masons. It has been listed on the National Register of Historic Places since March 28, 1985.
