= Old Hickory United Methodist Church =

Historic church in Tennessee, United States

- Old Hickory Methodist Church
- U.S. National Register of Historic Places
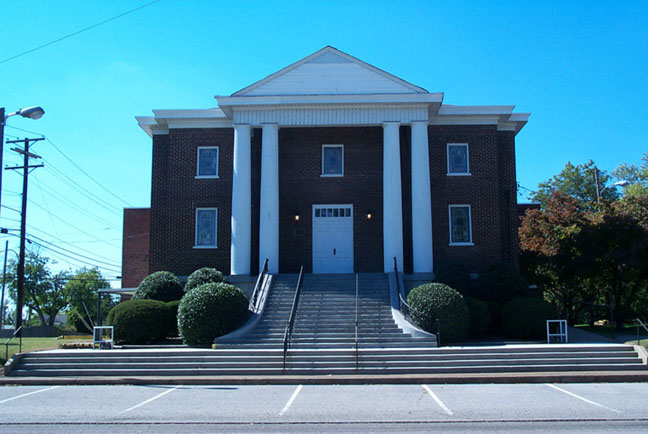

- Location within Tennessee Location within the United States
- Location: 1216 Hadley Ave., Old Hickory, Tennessee
- Coordinates: 36°15′28″N 86°38′52″W
- Area: 0.8 acres (0.32 ha)
- Built: 1928
- Architectural style: Classical Revival
- MPS: Old Hickory MRA
- NRHP reference No.: 85001557
- Added to NRHP: May 24, 1985

Old Hickory Methodist Church is a Methodist congregation which meets at 1216 Hadley Avenue in Old Hickory, Tennessee. The church building was constructed in 1928 and added to the National Register of Historic Places in 1985.

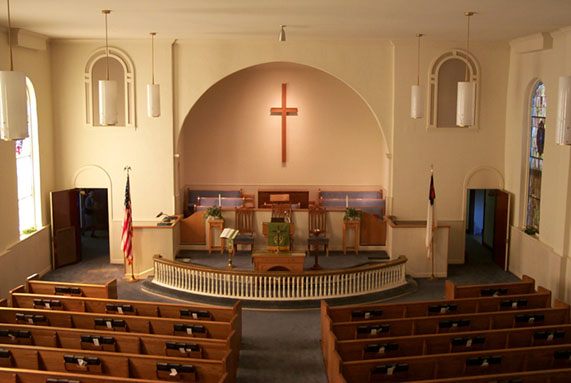
Sanctuary, Old Hickory Methodist Church

== History ==
Old Hickory Methodist Church was organized in 1925. Originally, it met in the "little gym," which is now the site of the Old Hickory Community Center. The construction of the current sanctuary began with services held in the basement. The sanctuary was completed in 1929 at a cost of $30,000, and the first service was held on the first Sunday in 1929. Pews were installed in 1936 to replace folding chairs. An educational annex was added in 1939 at a cost of $10,000, and second floor was added in 1954. In 1967 the sanctuary was remodeled and redecorated. Stained-glass windows were installed in 1983. The church was added to the National Register of Historic Places in May 1985.

New cushioned pews were added in 1990. Marvin Rodgers memorials placed new pew Bibles, lectern, wedding candle, Advent wreath, Paschal candlestick, communion ware, and candelabra in the sanctuary. In 1982, the Prayer Room was built.

In 2024, Old Hickory United Methodist Church made the decision to separate from the United Methodist Church, and so dropped "United" from the church name.

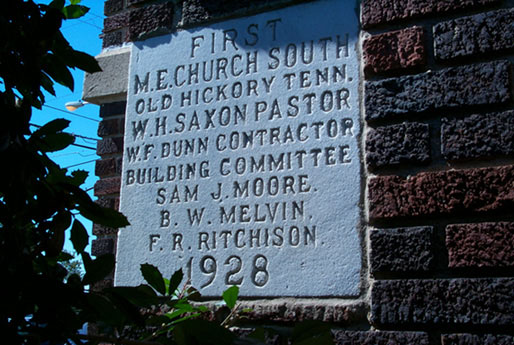
Cornerstone, Old Hickory Methodist Church
