= Gladstone Apartments =

- U.S. National Register of Historic Places
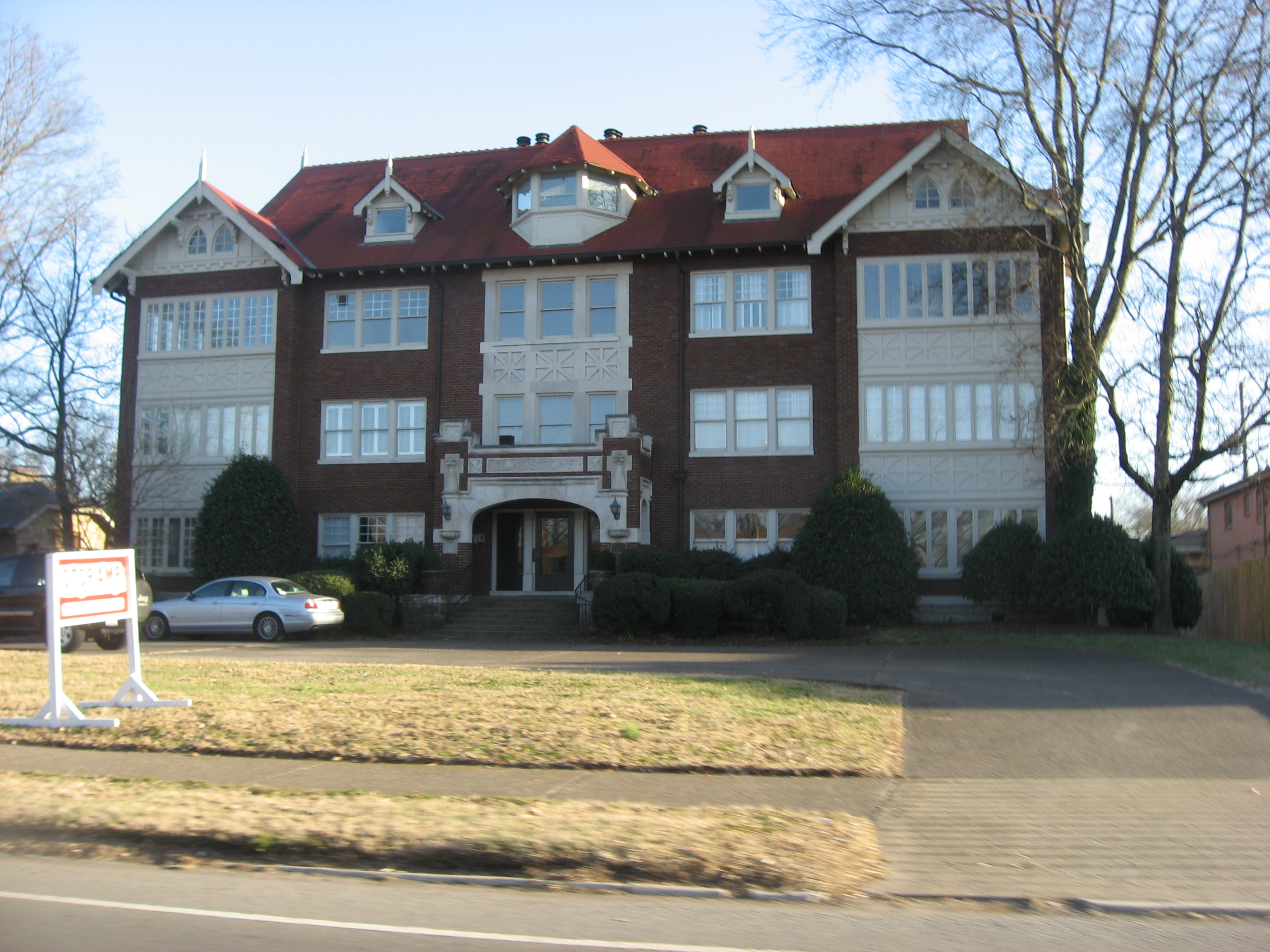
- Glastone Apartments in 2014

- Location within Tennessee
- Location: 3803 West End Avenue, Nashville, Tennessee
- Coordinates: 36°7′54″N 86°49′54″W
- Area: 0.4 acres (0.16 ha)
- Built: 1923
- Architectural style: Classical Revival
- NRHP reference No.: 83003025
- Added to NRHP: June 16, 1983

Gladstone Apartments is a historic apartment building in Nashville, Tennessee, U.S.. It was built in 1923 for Morris Fisher, a developer, and it was designed by architect Charles Ferguson. It has been listed on the National Register of Historic Places since June 16, 1983.
