= Dubuisson-Neuhoff House =

Historic house in Tennessee, United States

- Dubuisson--Neuhoff House
- U.S. National Register of Historic Places
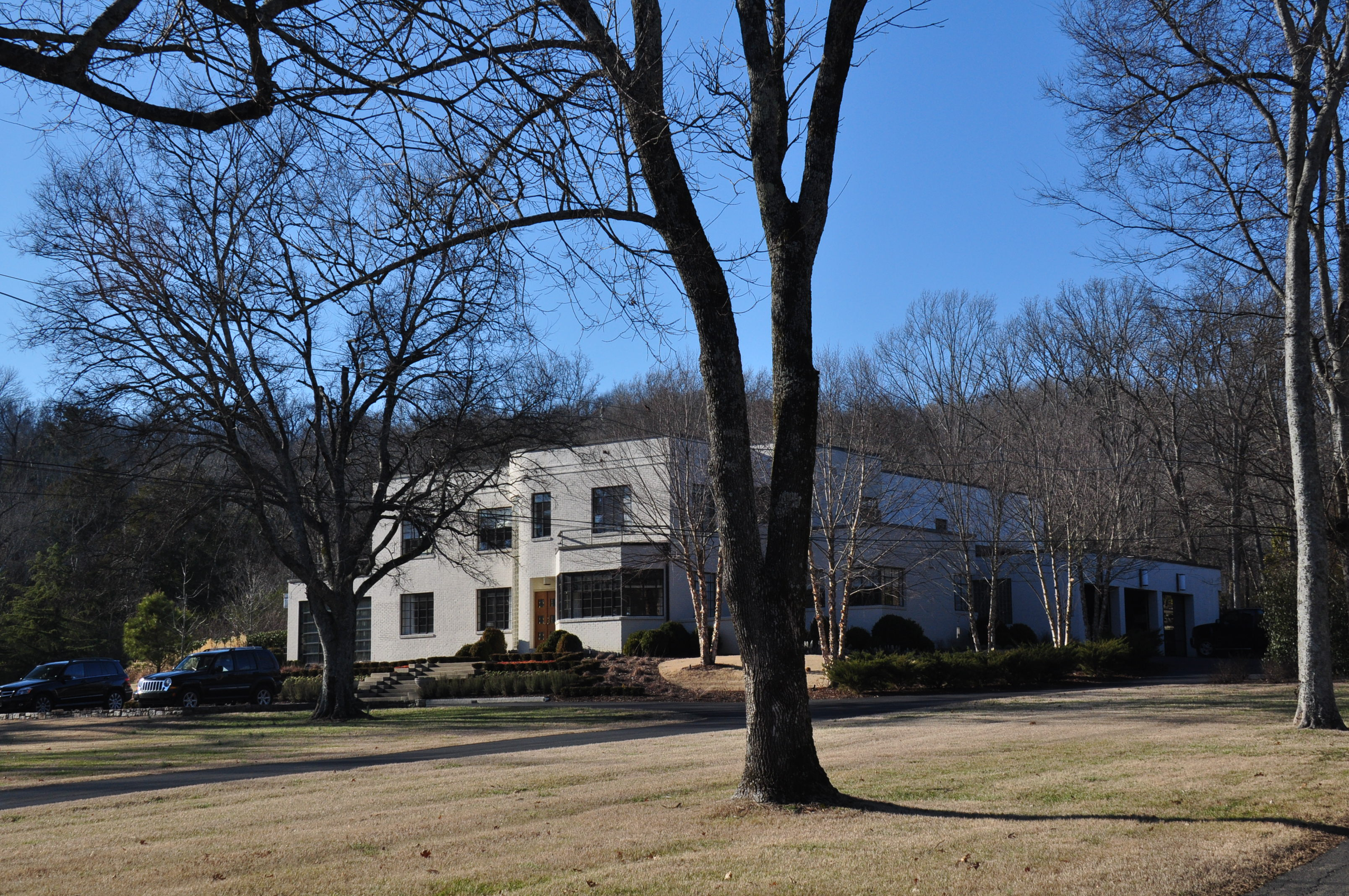
- The Dubuisson-Neuhoff House in 2015

- Location within Tennessee
- Location: 1407 Chickering Rd., Forest Hills, Tennessee
- Coordinates: 36°4′24″N 86°52′1″W
- Area: 3.4 acres (1.4 ha)
- Built: 1939
- Architectural style: International Style
- MPS: Forest Hills, Tennessee MPS
- NRHP reference No.: 03001077
- Added to NRHP: October 27, 2003

The Dubuisson-Neuhoff House is a historic mansion in Forest Hills, Tennessee, U.S..

== History ==
The land was purchased from Edwin Warner, Percy Warner's brother, by John H. Dubuisson and Dorothy Neuhoff in 1938. The house was built in 1939, and designed in the International Style. It was the home of Dorothy's father, Henry Neuhoff, a German-born businessman who founded the Neuhoff Packing Company, a meatpacking company, and co-founded the German-American Bank of Nashville.

The house has been listed on the National Register of Historic Places since October 27, 2003.
