= Sunnyside (Nashville, Tennessee) =

Historic house in Tennessee, United States

- U.S. National Register of Historic Places
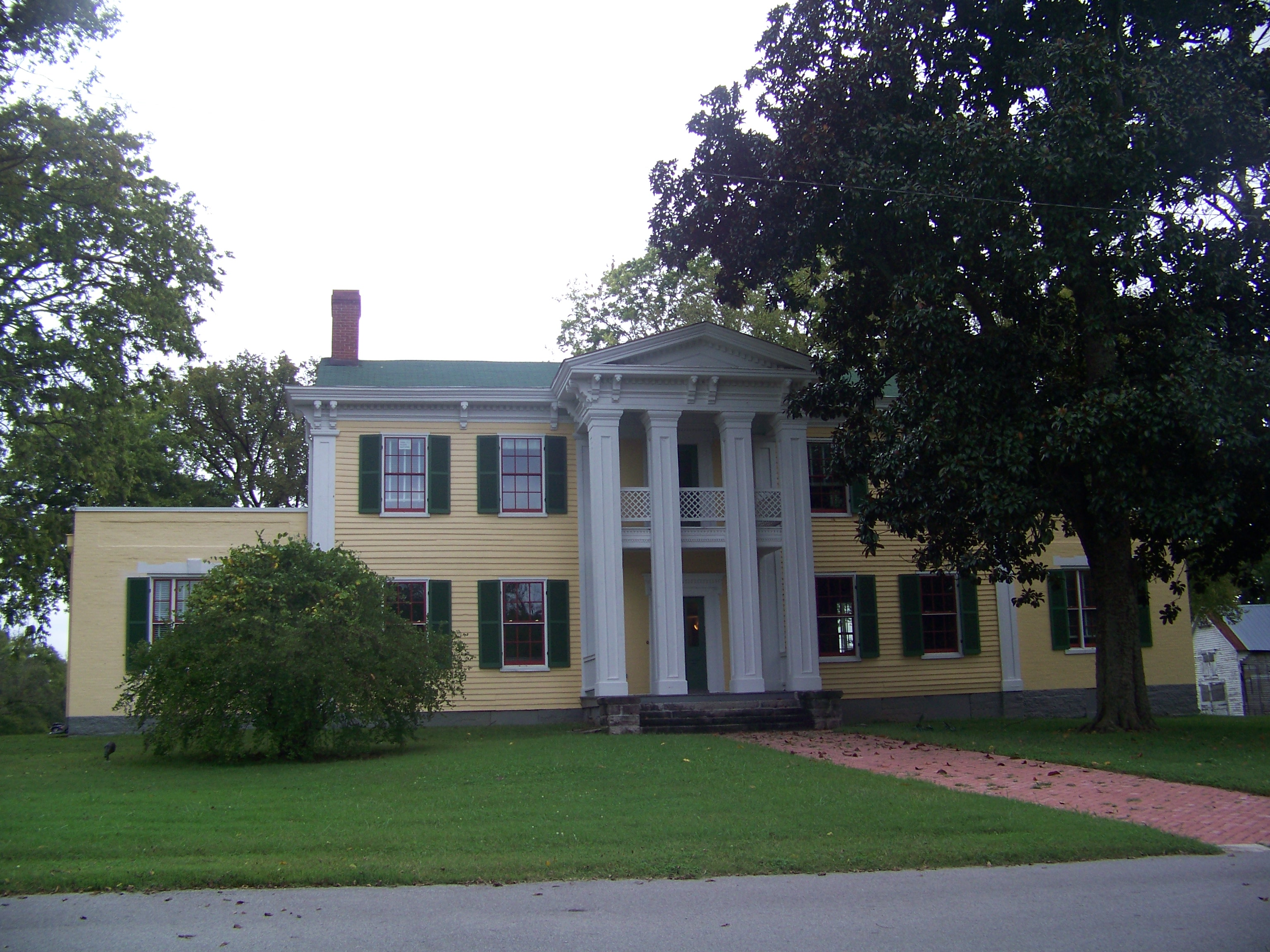
- Sunnyside in 2007

- Location within Tennessee Location within the United States
- Location: 3000 Granny White Pike, Nashville, Tennessee
- Coordinates: 36°7′9″N 86°47′20″W
- Area: less than one acre
- Built: 1840
- Architectural style: Greek Revival
- NRHP reference No.: 74001910
- Added to NRHP: October 1, 1974

Sunnyside is a historic mansion in Sevier Park, a public park in Nashville, Tennessee, USA.

== History ==
The two-story mansion was built in the 1840s. It was designed in the Greek Revival architectural style. It was built for Mary Childress Benton, the sister-in-law of Senator Thomas Hart Benton, after she became a widow. When her great-niece Mary Douglass married Theodore Francis Sevier, it became their family home.

In the 1860s, the mansion was purchased by John Armstrong Shute, who gave it to his daughter, Mrs Stephen W. Childress, as a present. It was damaged during the Battle of Nashville. Shortly after, it served as a hospital for wounded soldiers of the Confederate States Army. After the war, Childress renamed the mansion Lee Monte, after Confederate General Robert E. Lee.

In 1882, the mansion was purchased by Dr. L.G. Noel, a Professor of Dentistry at Vanderbilt University. In 1927, Granville Sevier, who was Mary Douglass Sevier's grandson, bought back the home, adding to it and renovating it. His children bequeathed Sunnyside to the City of Nashville in 1945. Three years later, in 1948, Sevier Park was established as a public park around the property.

The mansion was restored in 2004.

== Architectural significance ==
It has been listed on the National Register of Historic Places since October 1, 1974.
