= St. Patrick's Catholic Church and Rectory =

Historic church in Tennessee, United States

- U.S. National Register of Historic Places
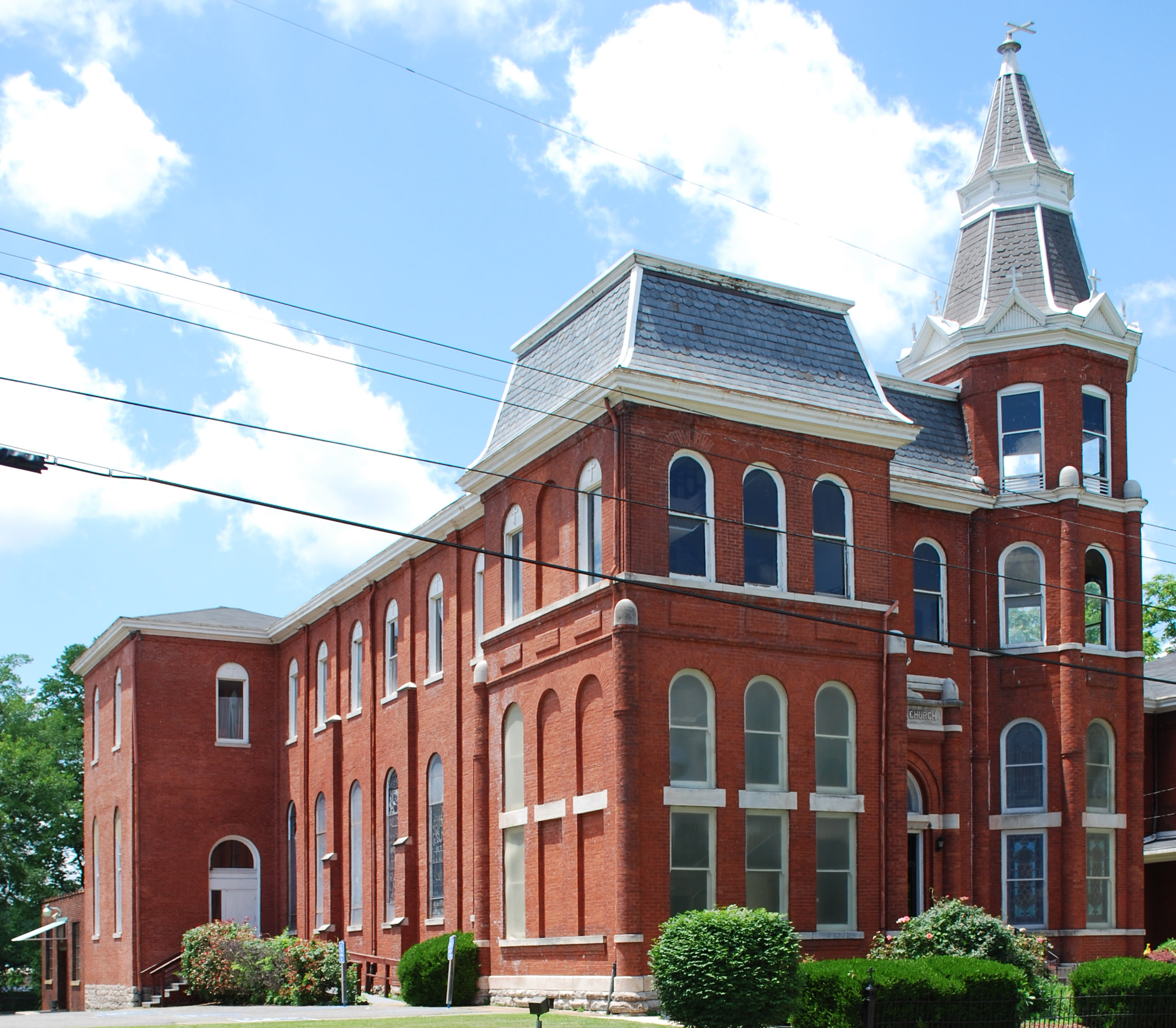

- Location within Tennessee Location within the United States
- Location: 1219 2nd Ave., S., Nashville, Tennessee
- Coordinates: 36°8′39″N 86°45′51″W
- Area: 0.6 acres (0.24 ha)
- Built: 1890
- Architectural style: Second Empire
- MPS: Nineteenth Century Churches of South Nashville TR
- NRHP reference No.: 84003516
- Added to NRHP: May 15, 1984

St. Patrick's Catholic Church and Rectory is a historic building at 1219 2nd Avenue, S. in Nashville, Tennessee, United States. It was built in 1890 and added to the National Register of Historic Places in 1984.
