= Fall School =

- U.S. National Register of Historic Places
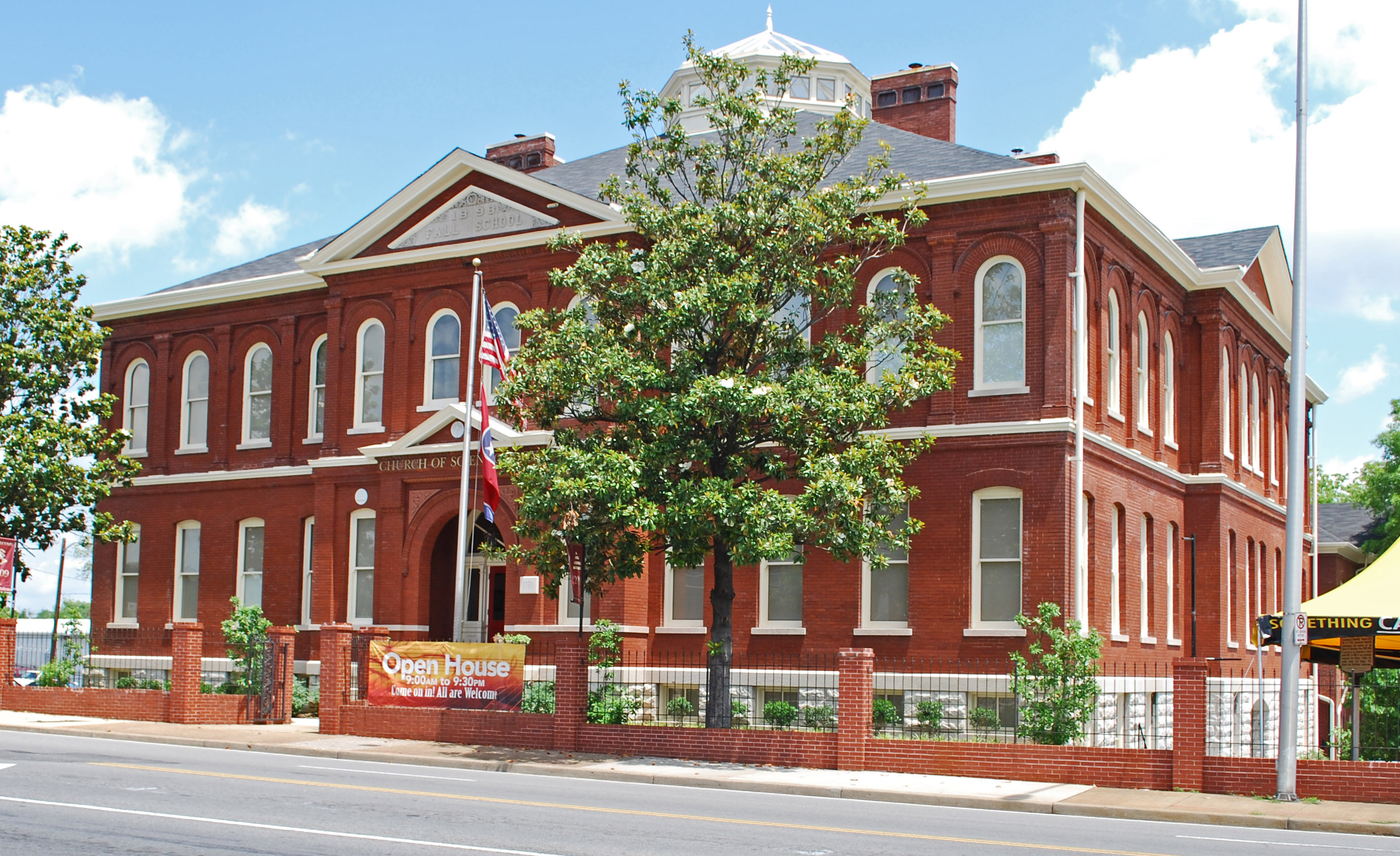
- The Fall School in 2010

- Location within Tennessee
- Location: 1130 8th Avenue South, Nashville, Tennessee
- Coordinates: 36°8′32″N 86°46′43″W
- Area: 1.4 acres (0.57 ha)
- Built: 1898
- Architectural style: Renaissance
- NRHP reference No.: 79002421
- Added to NRHP: December 19, 1979

The Fall School is the oldest public school building remaining in Nashville, Tennessee, U.S.

== History ==
Built in 1898, it was named after Phillip S. Fall, a Nashville businessman and member of the Board of Education from 1865 to 1867. The Fall School was notable because it had individual classrooms, unlike the earlier study hall design. It served as an elementary school until 1970, and has been listed on the National Register of Historic Places since December 19, 1979. In 1982 a private company renovated it for offices.

In 2007, the Church of Scientology purchased the building and renovated it for their Church of Scientology & Celebrity Centre Nashville. A grand opening was held on April 25, 2009.
