= Keeble =

Keeble is a surname. Notable people with the surname include:

- Brian Keeble, author
- Charles Keeble, Australian figure skater
- Chris Keeble, British Army veteran
- Cornelia Keeble (1898–1973), American clubwoman
- Curtis Keeble, British diplomat
- Edwin Augustus Keeble, American politician
- Edwin A. Keeble (c. 1905–1979), American architect
- Frederick Keeble (1870–1952), English botanist
- George Keeble (1849–1923), English cricketer
- Jerry Keeble (born 1963), American football player
- Jim Keeble, British author
- Joe Keeble, American football player
- John Keeble (disambiguation) multiple people, including
  - John Keeble, British pop musician
  - John Bell Keeble (1868–1929), American attorney and academic administrator
- Marshall Keeble, American preacher
- Noel Keeble, British World War I flyer
- Sally Keeble, British Labour politician
- Vic Keeble, English footballer
- Woodrow W. Keeble, American soldier, Medal of Honor recipient

== Fictional characters ==
- Lady Constance Keeble, fictional character by P. G. Wodehouse
- Samantha Keeble, fictional character from British TV series Eastenders

== See also ==
- Keeble v Hickeringill, English legal case
- Keebles Hut, Australian alpine hut
- Keeble Observatory, astronomical observatory
- Gordon-Keeble, former British car marque
- Max Keeble's Big Move, Disney comedy film
