= Edwin Keeble =

Edwin Keeble may refer to:

- Edwin Augustus Keeble (1807–1868), American politician
- Edwin A. Keeble (1905–1979), American architect
