= Senator Seay =

Senator Seay may refer to:

- Edward T. Seay (c. 1869–1941), Tennessee State Senate
- Valencia Seay (born 1953), Georgia State Senate
