= P. D. Houston Jr. House =

Historic house in Tennessee, United States

- P.D. Houston Jr. House
- U.S. National Register of Historic Places
- Location within Tennessee
- Location: 5617 Hillsboro Pike, Forest Hills, Tennessee
- Coordinates: 36°05′00″N 86°50′07″W
- Area: 15.6 acres (6.3 ha)
- Built: 1941
- Architect: Warfield and Keeble
- Architectural style: Tudor Revival
- MPS: Forest Hills, Tennessee MPS
- NRHP reference No.: 03001081
- Added to NRHP: October 27, 2003

The P. D. Houston Jr. House is a historic mansion in Forest Hills, Tennessee. Also known as Woods Cote, it was built in 1941 for P. D. Houston Jr., a banker who became the president of the First American National Bank in 1957. It was designed in the Tudor Revival architectural style by Warfield and Keeble. It was purchased by Norris H. Nielsen and his wife Britton in 1972. It has been listed on the National Register of Historic Places since October 27, 2003.
