= Richard E. Martin House =

Historic house in Tennessee, United States

- U.S. National Register of Historic Places
- Location within Tennessee
- Location: 30 Castlewood Court; Forest Hills, Tennessee
- Coordinates: 36°4′22″N 86°50′43″W
- Area: 1.3 acres (0.53 ha)
- Built: 1931
- Architect: Warfield & Keeble
- Architectural style: Tudor Revival
- MPS: Forest Hills, Tennessee MPS
- NRHP reference No.: 03001083
- Added to NRHP: October 27, 2003

The Richard E. Martin House, also known as Castlewood, is a historic mansion in Forest Hills, Tennessee. It was built in 1931 for Richard E. Martin.

It was designed in the Tudor Revival architectural style by architects Warfield & Keeble. Keeble himself lived in the Forest Hills neighborhood. It has been listed on the National Register of Historic Places since October 27, 2003.
