= John Keeble (disambiguation) =

John Keeble may refer to:

- John Keeble (composer) (1711–1786), English organist and composer
- John Keeble (writer) (born 1944), Canadian-American author
- John Bell Keeble (1868–1929), American attorney and academic administrator
- John Keeble (born 1959) is an English pop and rock drummer.

== See also ==
- John Keble (1792–1866), English churchman, poet, and one of the leaders of the Oxford Movement
