= KUOS =

KUOS may refer to:

- KUOS-LP, a low-power radio station (92.1 FM) licensed to serve Sedona, Arizona, United States
- Franklin County Airport (Tennessee) (ICAO code KUOS)
