= Dr. Cleo Miller House =

Historic house in Tennessee, United States

- U.S. National Register of Historic Places
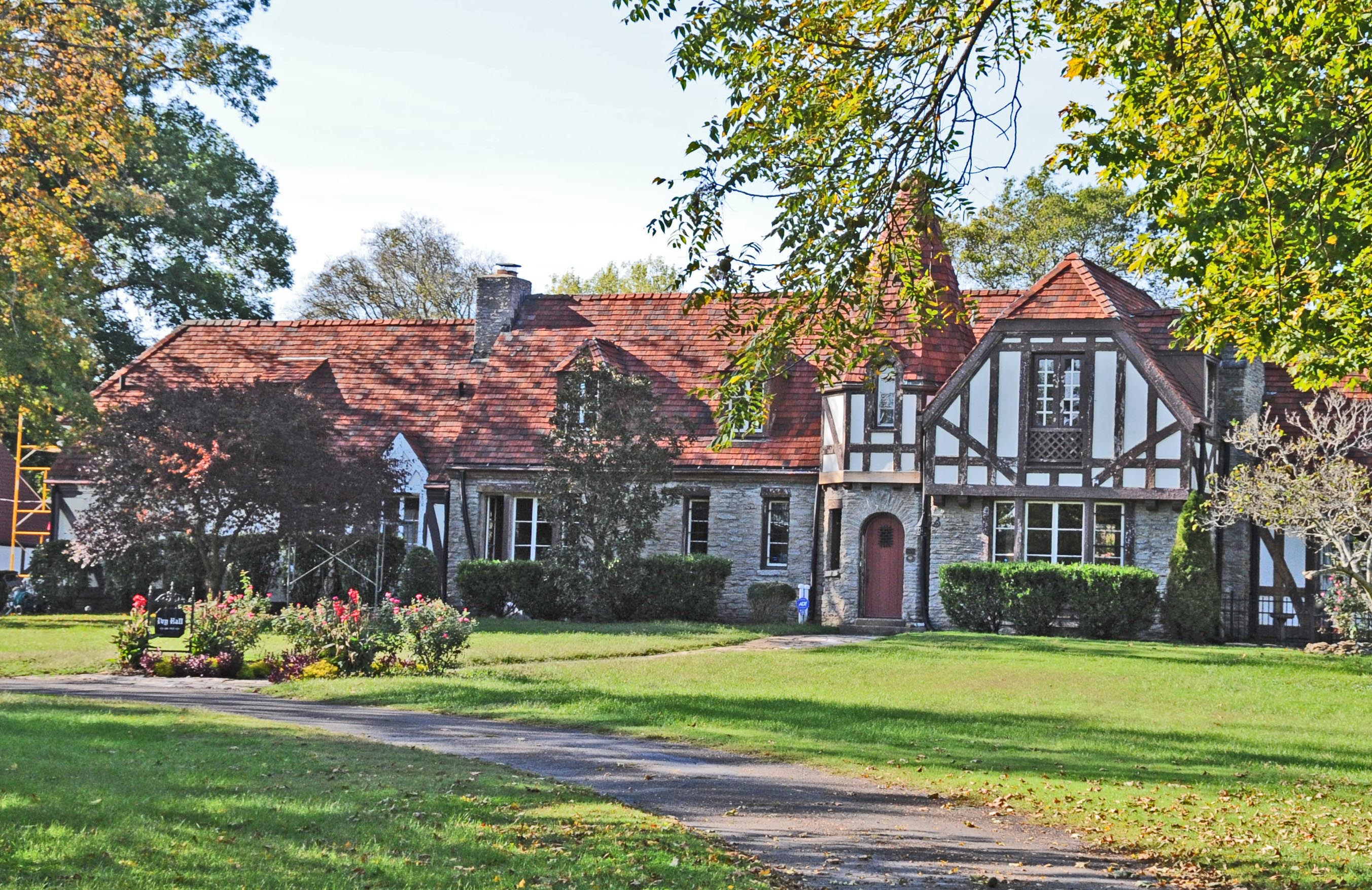
- The Dr. Cleo Miller House in 2015

- Location within Tennessee
- Location: 1431 Shelton Ave., Nashville, Tennessee
- Coordinates: 36.21055°N 86.72063°W
- Area: less than one acre
- Built: 1934-36
- Architect: Edwin A. Keeble
- Architectural style: Tudor Revival
- NRHP reference No.: 95001045
- Added to NRHP: August 25, 1995

The Dr. Cleo Miller House, also known as Ivy Hall, is a historic mansion in Nashville, Tennessee, U.S.. It was designed and built during 1934–1936. It is approximately 20 by 100 feet (6.1 m × 30.5 m) in plan. It was designed by Edwin A. Keeble in Tudor Revival architectural style. It was the residence of Dr. Cleo Miller, a college friend of Keeble's at Vanderbilt University.

The house has been listed on the National Register of Historic Places since August 25, 1995.
