= Dr. Cobb Pilcher House =

Historic house in Tennessee, United States

- U.S. National Register of Historic Places
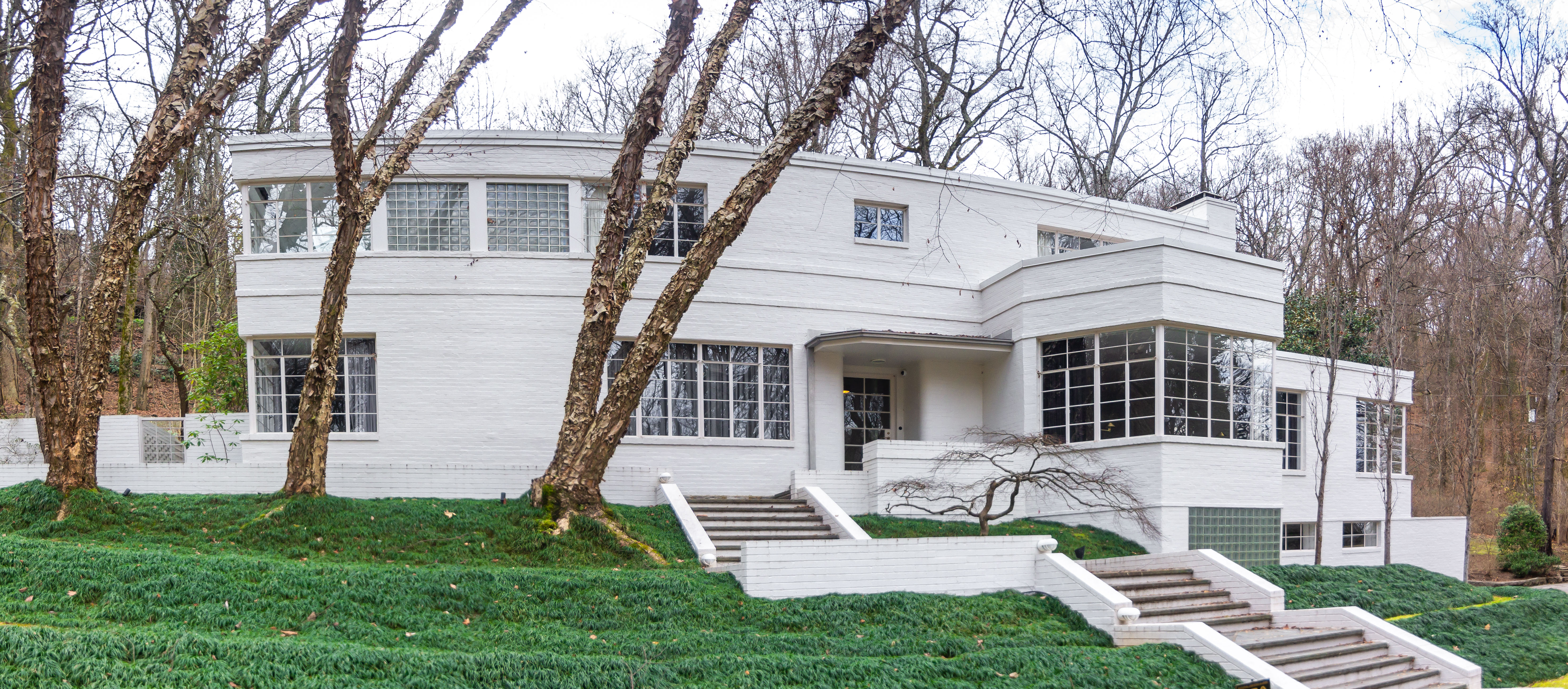
- Dr. Cobb Pilcher House

- Location within Tennessee
- Location: 5335 Stanford Dr., Forest Hills, Tennessee
- Coordinates: 36°4′55″N 86°49′37″W
- Area: 1.5 acres (0.61 ha)
- Built: 1936
- Architectural style: International Style
- MPS: Forest Hills, Tennessee MPS
- NRHP reference No.: 03001082
- Added to NRHP: October 27, 2003

The Dr. Cobb Pilcher House is a historic house in Forest Hills, Tennessee, U.S.. It was built in 1936 for Dr. Cobb Pilcher, a neurologist at Vanderbilt University. It was designed in the International Style by Warfield and Keeble. It has been listed on the National Register of Historic Places since October 27, 2003.
