= Randolph–Macon College =

Private liberal arts college in Ashland, Virginia, U.S.

- Motto: Building Extraordinary Futures
- Type: Private liberal arts college
- Established: 1830; 196 years ago
- Accreditation: Southern Association of Colleges and Schools Commission (SAOCASC)
- Religious affiliation: United Methodist Church
- Academic affiliations: NAICU; IAMSCU; Annapolis Group; Oberlin Group
- Endowment: $222.5 million (2025)
- President: Michael E. Hill
- Students: 1,854
- Undergraduates: 1,800 (fall 2025)
- Postgraduates: 54 (fall 2025)
- Location: Ashland, Virginia, U.S. 37.763°N 77.477°W
- Campus: 125 acres (51 ha); Suburban
- Newspaper: The Yellow Jacket
- Colors: Black and Yellow
- Nickname: Yellow Jackets
- Sporting affiliations: NCAA Division III Old Dominion Athletic Conference Continental Volleyball Conference
- Website: rmc.edu

Randolph–Macon College (RMC or, colloquially, Macon) is a private liberal arts college in Ashland, Virginia, United States. Founded in 1830, the college has an enrollment of more than 1,800 students. It is the second-oldest Methodist-run college in the country and the oldest in continuous operation. The college primarily offers bachelor's degrees with more than 55 areas of study.

== History ==
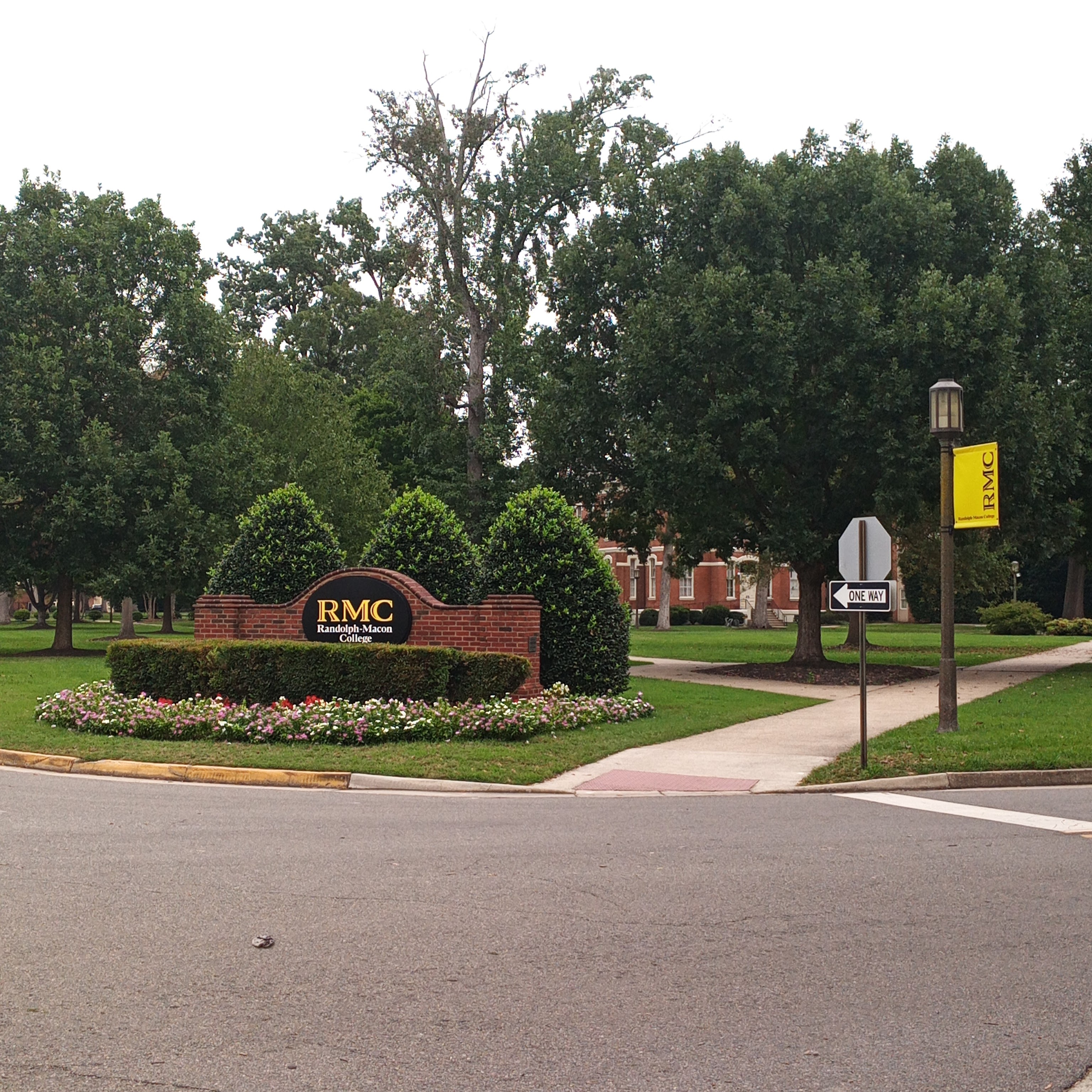
Sign at the entrance of the Randolph–Macon campus near downtown Ashland. Washington-Franklin Hall, the oldest building on campus, is visible in the background.

Randolph–Macon was founded in 1830 by Methodists Hekeziah G. Leigh and John Early and Staten Islander Gabriel Poillon Disosway. It was originally located in Boydton, near the North Carolina border, but as the railroad link to Boydton was destroyed during the Civil War, the college's trustees decided to relocate the school to Ashland in 1868. The college takes its name from Virginia statesman John Randolph and North Carolina statesman Nathaniel Macon.

The original site of Randolph–Macon features a historical marker and ruins of the classroom buildings. The original campus became the home of the Boydton Academic and Bible Institute, a Christian school for African Americans which operated from 1878 to 1935.

In 1847, Randolph–Macon College established a relationship with Hampden–Sydney College. The relationship led to the formation of the Randolph–Macon Medical School, which closed in 1851. Its president William A. Smith delivered a set of lectures advocating slavery in 1856 and 1857.

The college has a historical relationship with Randolph College (formerly known as Randolph-Macon Woman's College) in Lynchburg, Virginia. The former women's college was founded under Randolph–Macon's original charter in 1893 by the then-president William Waugh Smith; it was intended as a female counterpart to the then all-male Randolph-Macon. The two schools later separated to become distinct institutions governed by two separate boards. Randolph–Macon College became co-educational in 1971 with the enrollment of 50 women and the first full-time female faculty member. (Randolph College became co-educational in 2007.)

In 1892, two preparatory schools—both called Randolph–Macon Academy—were founded. The only one that remains today is Randolph–Macon Academy in Front Royal, Virginia. Randolph–Macon Academy is today the only co-educational military boarding school in the country with an Air Force Junior Reserve Officer Training Corps (AFJROTC) affiliated with the United States Air Force. Currently, there are no formal relationships or agreements between Randolph-Macon Academy and Randolph–Macon College aside from the shared names, mascots, and school colors.

Randolph-Macon College became the first college south of the Mason–Dixon line to require physical education coursework for graduation. The old gym, built in 1887, was the first structure in the South to be constructed solely for instruction in physical education. Randolph–Macon is considered to be the first college in the South to offer English as a full discipline and to develop biology as a distinct study. Its computer science department is one of the oldest in the country associated with a liberal arts school; in the 1960s, when the program was established, many academics believed computer science to be more appropriate for a commercial trade or secretarial school than a traditional four-year institution.

Since 1923, the college has been home to the Zeta of Virginia chapter of Phi Beta Kappa society, the nation's oldest academic honor society. Chi Beta Phi, the national science honorary society, was founded at Randolph-Macon in 1916.

== Academics ==
Randolph-Macon offers three undergraduate degrees: the bachelor of arts, the bachelor of science, and the bachelor of nursing. All students must satisfy the general collegiate curriculum, which requires them to take courses pillars that span the curriculum, as well as courses that enhance communication and encourage wellness. All students complete a capstone, which may be an internship, research project, or field study. Randolph-Macon's most popular majors, based on 2025 graduates, were:

- Business/Commerce, General (60)
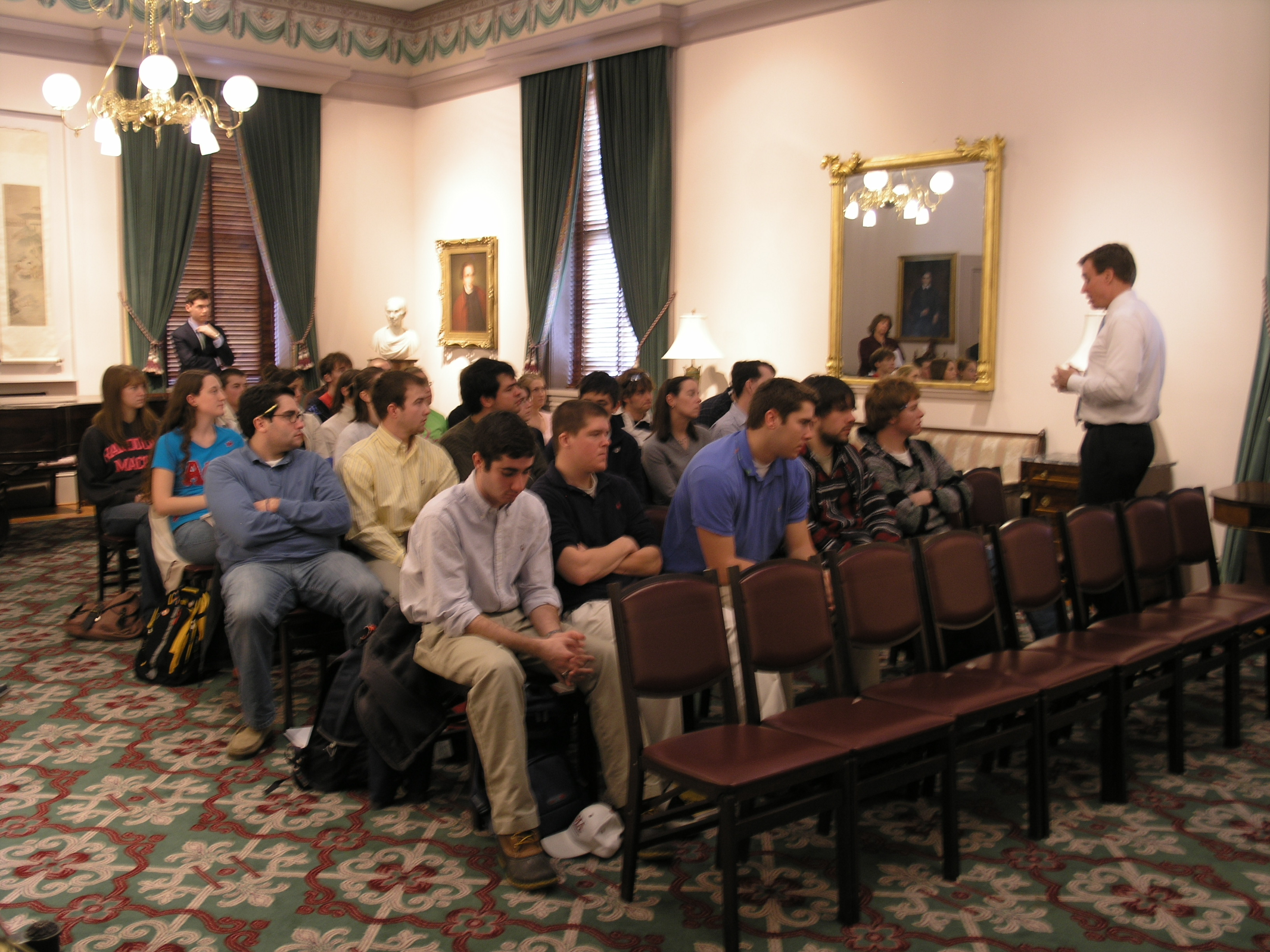
  Governor Mark Warner speaks to students in a classroom at Randolph Macon
- Biology/Biological Sciences (33)
- Registered Nursing (26)
- Psychology (26)
- Communication (19)
- Computer and Information Sciences (17)

The institution began providing a master of science program in physician's assistant studies in 2023, which awarded 22 graduates in 2025. The PA MS is accredited by the Accreditation Review Commission on Education for the Physician Assistant, ARC-PA)

Randolph-Macon also offers additional accredited programs:

- Initial-Licensure Level (accredited by the Council for the Accreditation of Educator Preparation, CAEP)
- Baccalaureate (accredited by the Commission on Collegiate Nursing Education, CCNE)

== Facilities ==
- Randolph–Macon College Buildings
- U.S. National Register of Historic Places
- Virginia Landmarks Register
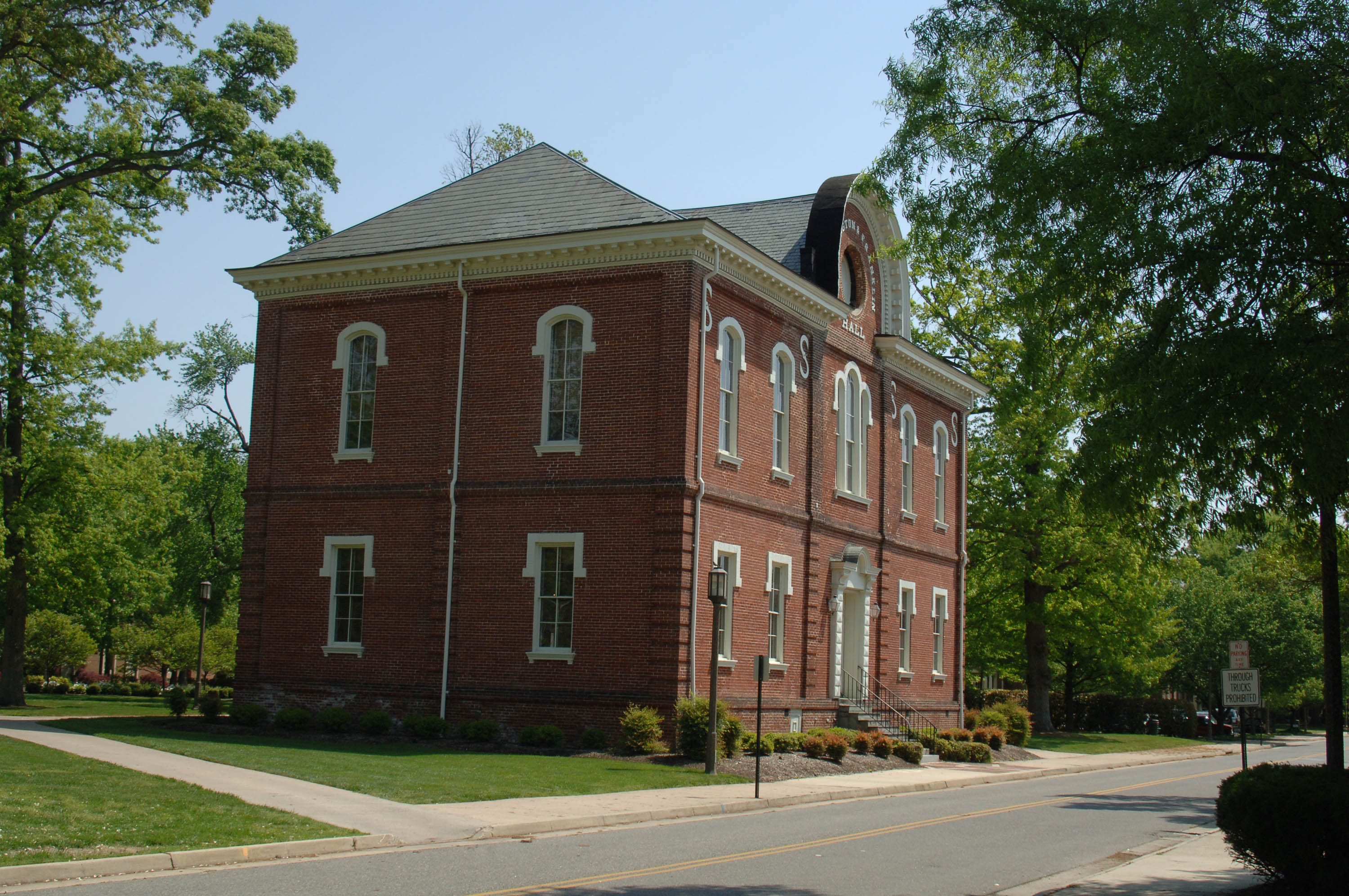

- Location within Virginia Location within the United States
- Location: Randolph–Macon College campus, Ashland, Virginia
- Coordinates: 37°45′39″N 77°28′47″W
- Area: 4.5 acres (1.8 ha)
- Built: 1872
- Architects: B.F. Price; William West
- Architectural style: Gothic, Italianate
- NRHP reference No.: 79003044
- VLR No.: 166-0002

Significant dates
- Added to NRHP: June 19, 1979
- Designated VLR: April 17, 1979

Randolph–Macon College has over 65 academic, administrative, athletic, and residential buildings on its campus of 125 acres(0.5 km^{2}) located in the heart of Ashland, Virginia. The oldest building is Washington-Franklin Hall, built in 1872, soon after the college moved to Ashland from Boydton. It was the first brick building in Ashland, and its construction was funded by the students. Renovated in 1987, Washington-Franklin Hall now houses the history department. Pace-Armistead Hall was built in 1876 (renovated 1997) and originally housed the chemistry department. Today, it is home to the studio art department. The original Duncan Methodist Church was built in 1879 and was renovated to include classrooms and offices for the music and arts departments. All three buildings are listed on the National Register of Historic Places, and collectively they make up "Historic Campus."

Copley Science Center is the largest academic building on campus, and is connected to Macon Brock, Jr. Hall. Together, they house programs in biology, chemistry, physics/astrophysics, engineering, environmental studies, computer science, cybersecurity, psychology, behavioral neuroscience, data science and mathematics. Just north of Copley is Keeble Observatory, which includes a 12" Cassegrain reflector optical telescope, and two radio telescopes. Randolph-Macon has been repeatedly featured on Princeton Review's "Best Science Lab Facilities" list.

Randolph-Macon has one main library: McGraw-Page Library. Formerly, the library was located in Peele Hall, which is now the main administrative building on-campus.

There are 12 residence halls on campus. The seven halls on the north end of campus are collectively known as the Village. Many of the college's freshmen live in one of those halls. The four located near the center of campus house upperclassmen and the remaining freshmen. These include the two oldest residence halls – Thomas Branch Hall and Mary Branch Hall. The college also owns most of the fraternity and sorority houses, other houses devoted to special interest groups, and on-campus townhouses and apartments (usually reserved for seniors). Andrews Hall, named after former dean of students Rev. Ira Andrews, opened in fall 2011. The newest residence hall, Birdsong Hall, named for Constance and Thomas Birdsong '49, opened in fall 2014. Birdsong Hall provides housing for upperclassmen, including common areas, study rooms, and laundry facilities. In 2025, the college opened the Spotswood Village apartments, on the west side of the train tracks.

The college completed a capital campaign in 2018, which exceeded its $100 million goal. A large portion of those funds went toward enhancing facilities, including two new residence halls, new football and baseball fields and stadiums, additions and renovations to the McGraw-Page Library and Copley Science Center, and the student center, Brock Commons, which was rebuilt in 2013. Subsequent fundraising efforts went to completing three additional buildings: Payne Hall, opened in 2020 and home to RMC's nursing program, Duke Hall in 2023, home to a master's degree program in Physician Assistants Studies as well as enhanced athletic facilities, and the enlarged and renovated Center for the Performing Arts.

The main north–south railroad line for the east coast runs through the campus. Most of the campus is located to the east of the railroad, but a handful of college offices, special interest houses, and athletic fields are located to the west of the tracks. The Ashland train station (not part of the RMC campus) is directly across from the southern entrance to the campus.

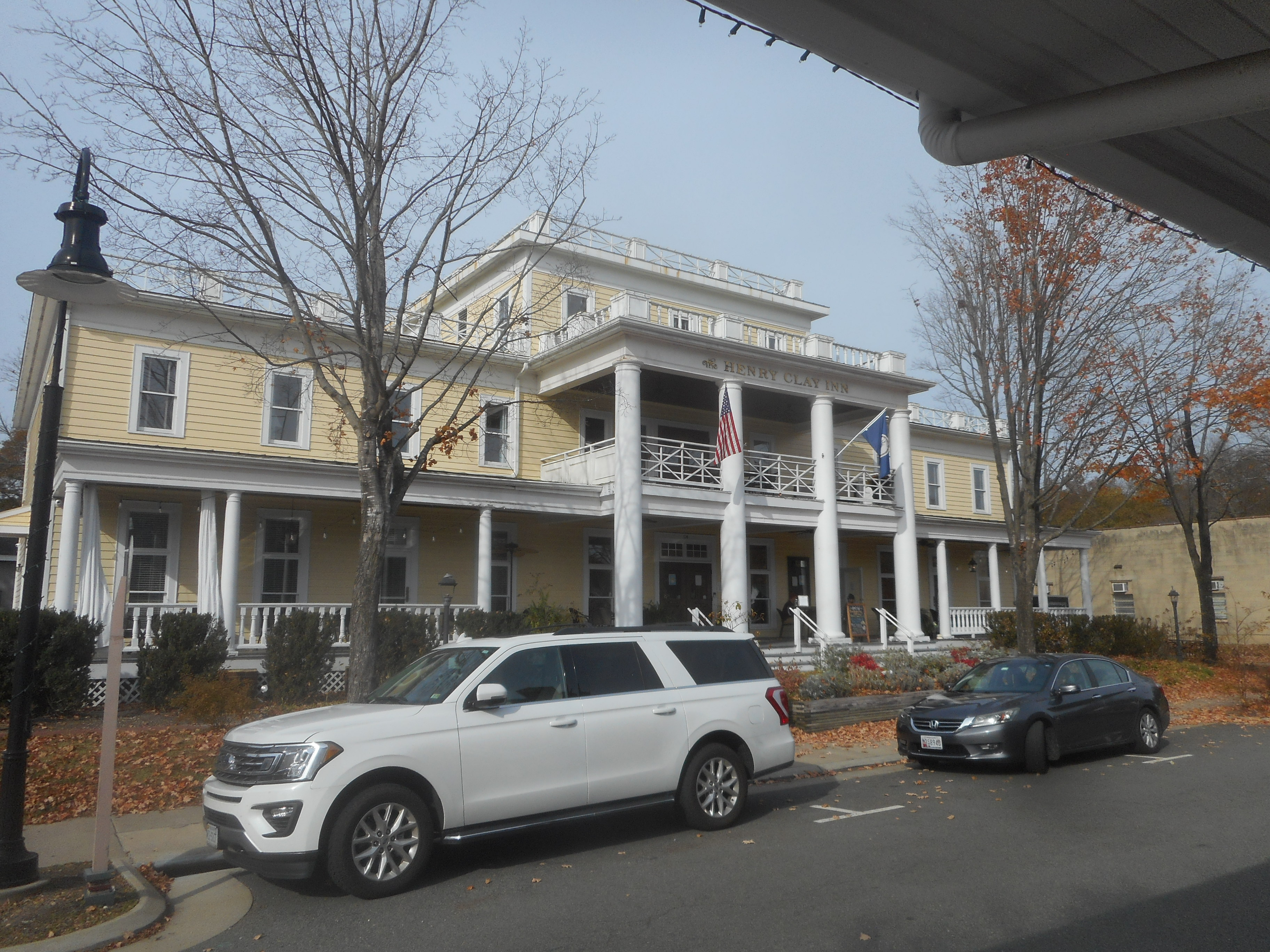
Henry Clay Inn

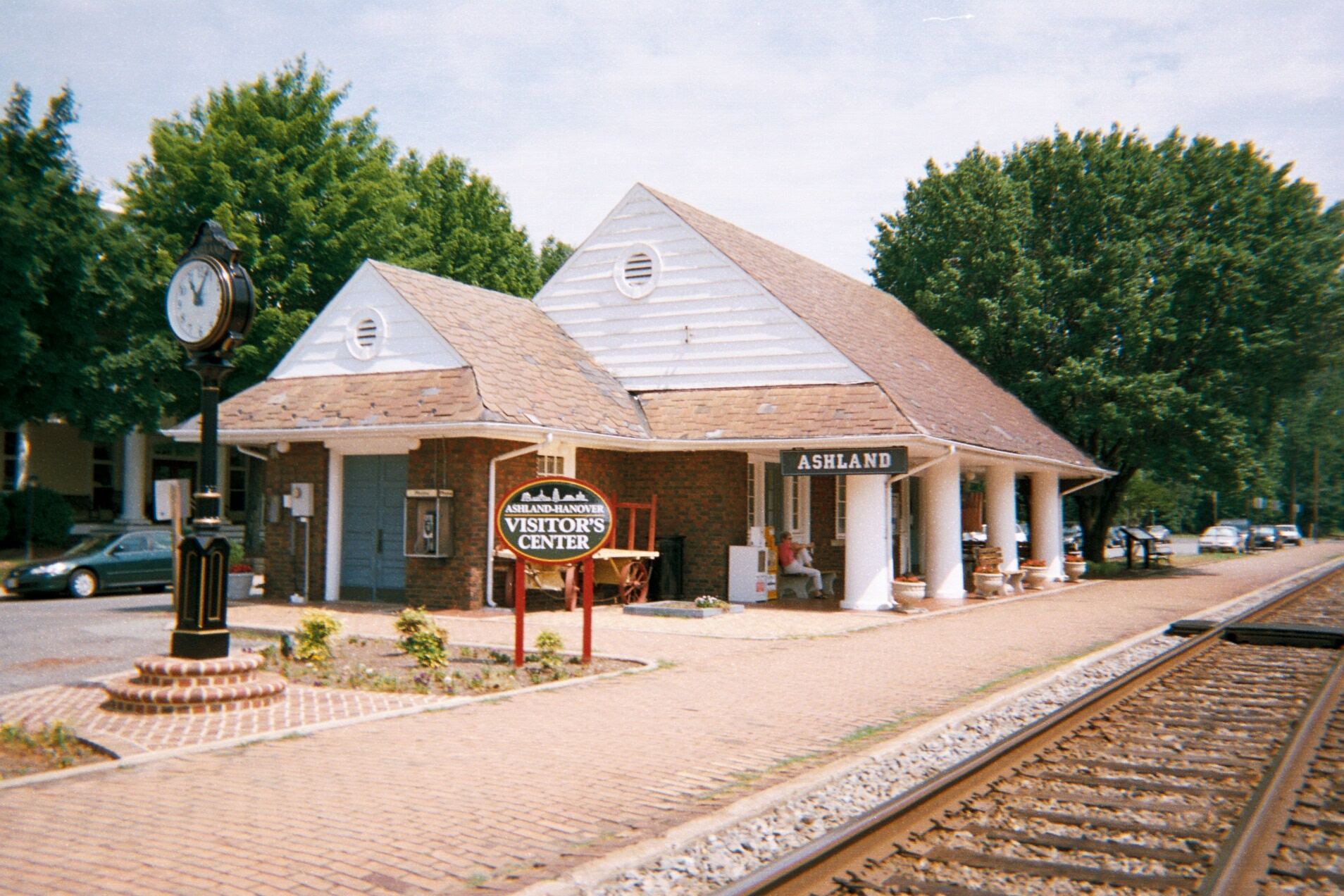
Ashland Station

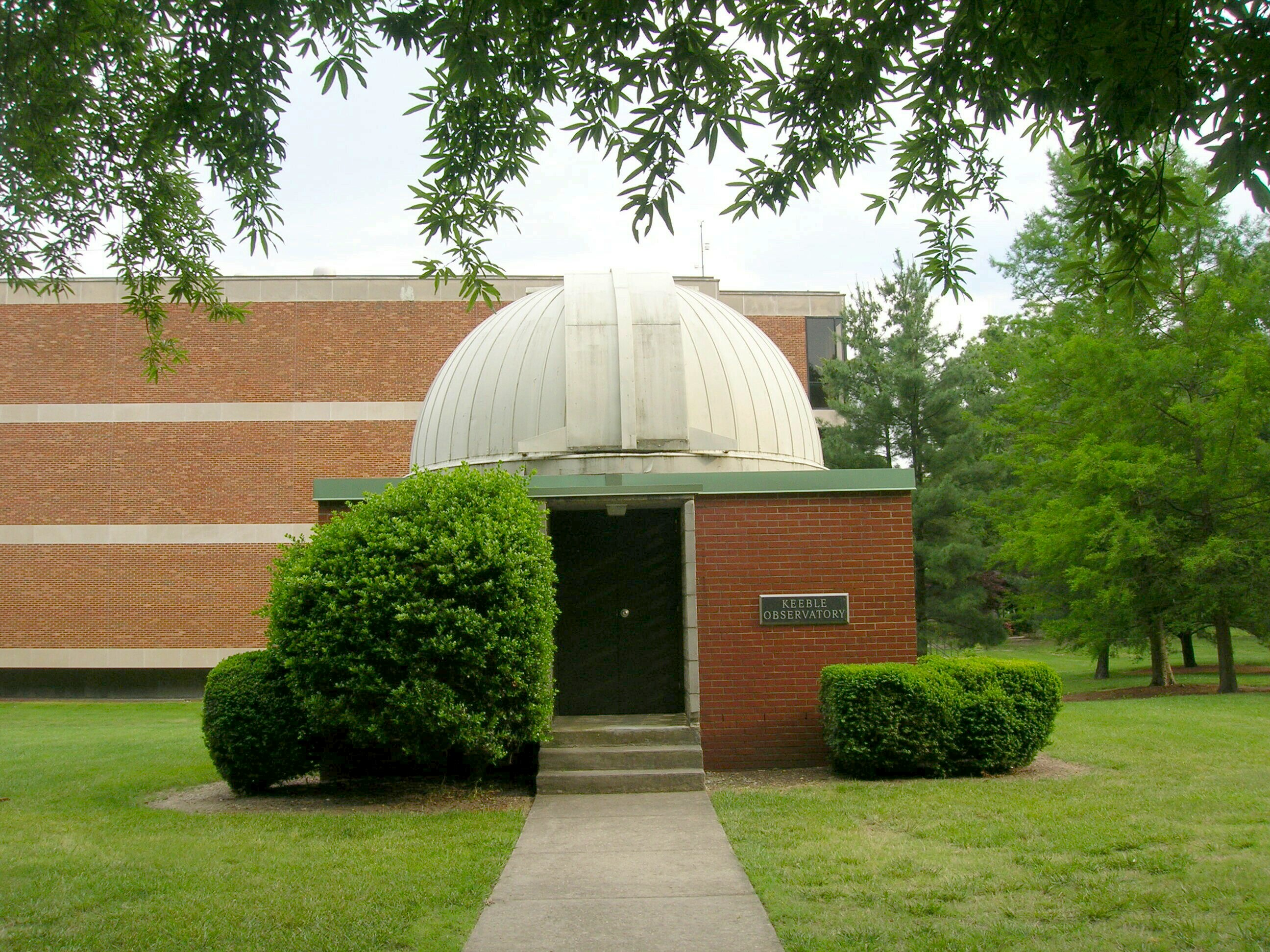
Keeble Observatory

== Athletics ==
Randolph–Macon athletic teams are the Yellow Jackets (or more simply, as "The Jackets"). The college is a member of the Division III level of the National Collegiate Athletic Association (NCAA), primarily competing in the Old Dominion Athletic Conference (ODAC) since the 1976–77 academic year.

Randolph–Macon competes in 20 intercollegiate varsity sports: Men's sports include baseball, basketball, football, golf, lacrosse, soccer, swimming, tennis and volleyball (which was added in 2019); while women's sports include basketball, field hockey, golf, lacrosse, soccer, softball, swimming, tennis and volleyball; and co-ed sports include dance/cheer and equestrian.

The Hampden–Sydney vs. Randolph–Macon rivalry is a sports rivalry between the Hampden–Sydney College Tigers and the Randolph–Macon College Yellow Jackets. The college football rivalry between the NCAA Division III schools, often known simply as "The Game", dates to 1893 and has been called the oldest small-school rivalry in the Southern United States. The rivalry now crosses all sports, with the men's basketball series in particular gaining national attention.

Randolph–Macon won its first national championship in 2022 in basketball, defeating Elmhurst University with a score of 75–45.

== Notable faculty ==
- Dave Brat, former Republican Congressman for Virginia's 7th congressional district
- Thomas Inge, professor of Humanities
- Seth Clabough, American novelist and English professor
- William E. Dodd, American ambassador to Germany 1933–1937
- David Seth Doggett, professor in the 1860s and later a bishop of the Methodist Episcopal Church, South
- Roxane Gilmore, classics professor and former First Lady of Virginia
- Nathaniel Thomas Lupton, professor of chemistry
- Debra Rodman, associate professor of anthropology and women's studies and member of the Virginia House of Delegates for District 73
