= Monroe Carell Jr. Children's Hospital at Vanderbilt =

Children's hospital in Nashville, Tennessee, U.S.

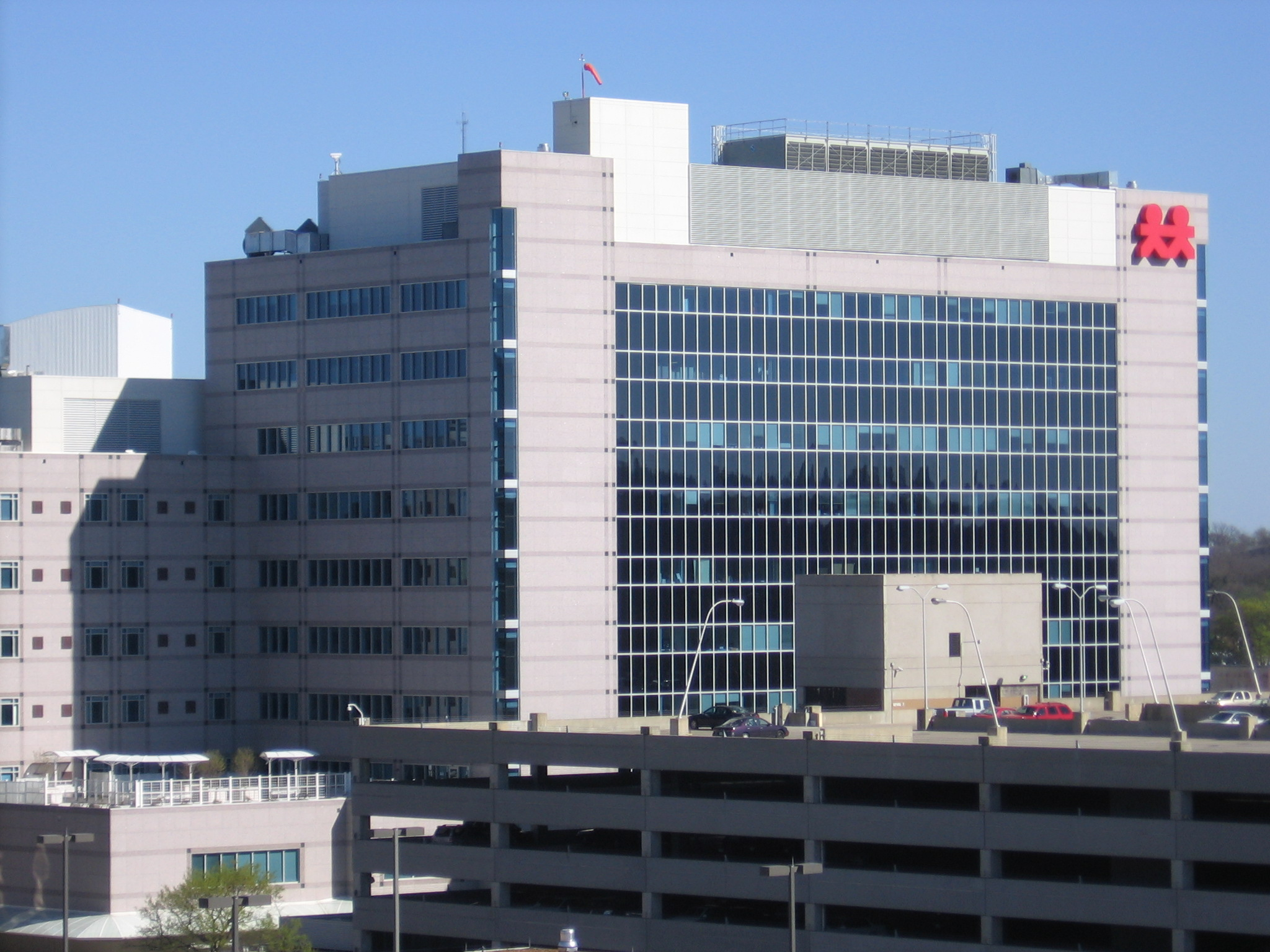
- Monroe Carell Jr. Children's Hospital in 2007

Geography
- Location: Nashville, Tennessee, United States
- Coordinates: 36.1393°N 86.8025°W

Organization
- Type: Non-Profit Teaching Children's
- Affiliated university: Vanderbilt University

Services
- Emergency department: Level I Pediatric Trauma Center
- Beds: 343

History
- Founded: 1970

Links
- Website: http://childrenshospitalvanderbilt.org/
- Lists: Hospitals in the United States

Monroe Carell Jr. Children's Hospital at Vanderbilt, also known as Children's Hospital at Vanderbilt, is a nationally ranked pediatric acute care children's teaching hospital and entity of Vanderbilt University Medical Center in Nashville, Tennessee, United States. The hospital is affiliated with Vanderbilt University School of Medicine's Department of Pediatrics.

Children's Hospital at Vanderbilt comprises 343 pediatric beds and over 1 million square feet of clinical and administrative space. The hospital provides comprehensive pediatric specialties and subspecialties to infants, children, teens, and young adults aged 0–21 throughout Nashville and the greater mid-south region. The hospital also sometimes treats adults who require pediatric care.

Children's Hospital at Vanderbilt also features an American College of Surgeons level I pediatric trauma center for critically ill pediatric trauma patients. The hospital is attached to Vanderbilt University Medical Center, including Vanderbilt University Hospital. It is affiliated with the nearby Ronald McDonald House of Nashville.

Children's Hospital at Vanderbilt is routinely ranked among the best children's hospitals in the nation by U.S. News & World Report.

== History ==
Vanderbilt Children's Hospital began in 1923 when the Junior League of Nashville, under the leadership of Cornelia Keeble Ewing, established the Junior League Home for Crippled Children. The Children's Regional Medical Center within Vanderbilt University Medical Center was founded in 1971.

In the fall of 1971, Frances Keltner Hardcastle led a group of dedicated women and community leaders of the Junior League of Nashville, who had created and sustained the Junior League Home for Crippled Children, to form the Friends of the Children's Hospital (established in 1972) to support the Children's Regional Medical Center and to raise funding and public awareness for a fully distinct Children's Hospital at Vanderbilt.

In 1980, construction on the Vanderbilt Children's Hospital facility was completed, and the patients from both the Children's Hospital and the Junior League Home for Crippled Children moved into a single medical facility dedicated to children's medicine.

During the 1980s and '90s, the Friends of the Children's Hospital continued community outreach and development efforts to support the Children's Hospital at Vanderbilt University. Monroe J. Carell, Jr., former CEO of Central Parking Corporation, lead in the raising of $79 million in funds for the construction of a new stand-alone facility, including $20 million from his family's personal donations.

In 2004, the 616,785-square-foot (57,301.2 m^{2}) Monroe Carell Jr. Children's Hospital at Vanderbilt University opened with 238 inpatient beds, 16 operating rooms, 36 intensive care unit beds, and space for 104 premature infants in the neonatal intensive-care unit.

In 2007, Providence House published More Than a Place: The Origins of a Children's Hospital at Vanderbilt by Lisa A. DuBois. More Than a Place traces the development of the children's hospital from its genesis as the Junior League Home for Crippled Children to its establishment as a premiere children's hospital, detailing how the hospital's advocates battled racism, religious differences, politicians, academics, lawsuits, and hospital administration in addition to disease and pain to ensure that children in middle Tennessee were served by a medical facility dedicated to them.

== About ==
The freestanding Monroe Carell Jr. Children's Hospital at Vanderbilt opened on February 8, 2004. Receiving over 375,000 pediatric cases per year, with 15,000 inpatients and 357,000+ treated in the emergency and outpatient departments, the not-for-profit hospital provides pediatric health care regardless of ability to pay.

Children's Hospital at Vanderbilt is equipped with 343 licensed inpatient beds, including 119 in its neonatal intensive care unit and 61 devoted to critical care (pediatric intensive care unit and pediatric cardiac intensive care unit). It has 42 emergency department rooms, three surgical locations and 21 operating rooms.

In its 2021 fiscal year, Children's Hospital at Vanderbilt recorded 35,511 emergency department visits; 369,914 clinic visits; 26,048 telehealth visits; and 18,180 surgeries.

== Research and innovations ==
- In 1961, Dr. Mildred Stahlman pioneered the first newborn intensive care unit (NICU) in the country to use monitored respiratory therapy on infants with damaged lungs. On Oct. 31, 1961, a baby girl was born at Vanderbilt hospital two months prematurely and gasping for breath. With the permission of her parents, Martha H. Lott was placed into the negative-pressure breathing machine Dr. Stahlman modified from an infant "iron-lung" machine to keep her sufficiently ventilated until her lungs could develop for her to breathe on her own. Today, Ms. Lott fights on behalf of newborns with similar stories to her own as a nurse in the NICU.
- In 1972, with funding from a Regional Medical Program (RMP) grant, Vanderbilt initiated its Pediatric and Neonatal Transport (originally called 'Angel Transport') service. The first mobile neonatal and pediatric critical care transport of its kind, its Pediatric Transport Team consists of a neonatal nurse practitioner, a neonatal respiratory therapist, a neonatal registered nurse, an emergency medical technician, and a driver able to double as an assistant. The transport vehicles are equipped with ventilators and monitoring equipment including a blood gas analyzer that enable it to serve the large referral areas of Tennessee, Southern and Western Kentucky, and North Alabama. 2014 marked the 40th anniversary of the program at Vanderbilt.
- By 2006, Children's Hospital ranked 6th in the nation for NIH research funding, with grants issued to researchers from the Department of Pediatrics totaling $20.238 million.
- In November 2016, researchers at Vanderbilt University Medical Center and Washington University School of Medicine isolated a human monoclonal antibody that in a mouse model "markedly reduced" infection by the Zika virus. The antibody, called ZIKV-117, was able to inhibit infection by strains from both Africa and America in cell culture and in animals, including during pregnancy. These naturally occurring human antibodies isolated from humans represent the first medical intervention that prevents Zika infection and damage to fetuses.

== Awards & rankings ==
- Third Magnet status, awarded by the American Nurses Credentialing Center in 2017
- Named a Leapfrog Top Hospital for 2017
- The Joint Commission (JCAHO) accredits Children's Hospital. JCAHO accreditation is a nationwide seal of approval that indicates a hospital meets high performance standards, requiring on-site surveys by a JCAHO team at least every three years.
- Ranked as the No. 1 children's hospital in Tennessee and tied as No. in the Southeast in the 2025-2026 U.S. News & World Report rankings

== Specialties ==
- Adolescent and Young Adult Health
- Allergy, Immunology and Pulmonary Medicine
- Anesthesiology
- Cardiology
- Critical Care Medicine
- Dentistry
- Dermatology
- Developmental Medicine
- Diagnostic Imaging (Radiology)
- Emergency Medicine
- Endocrinology and Diabetes
- Gastroenterology
- General Pediatrics
- Heart Surgery
- Hematology and Oncology
- Hepatology
- Infectious Diseases
- Medical Genetics and Genomic Medicine
- Neonatology
- Nephrology
- Neurology
- Neurosurgical Services
- Nutrition
- Ophthalmology
- Oral and Maxillofacial Surgery
- Orthopaedics
- Otolaryngology (Ear, Nose, and Throat)
- Plastic Surgery
- Psychiatry - Child and Adolescent
- Rheumatology
- Urology

== Expansion efforts ==
In September 2016, Children's Hospital began construction on a 160,000-square-foot four-floor expansion for a projected cost of $100 million. The facility's expansion was supported by a fundraising effort led by Kathryn Carell Brown. The first two floors to be completed will provide approximately 80,000 square feet of new patient care space and will include 76 critical and acute care beds for newborns and pediatric patients. The new space will also include family areas, a playroom, a large waiting room, educational space and patient consultation rooms.

The hospital originally underwent a 30,000-square-foot (2,800 m^{2}) expansion with a $30 million price tag in May 2012. The five-story addition added 33 beds, as well as additional treatment areas.
