= Milliken Building =

- U.S. National Register of Historic Places
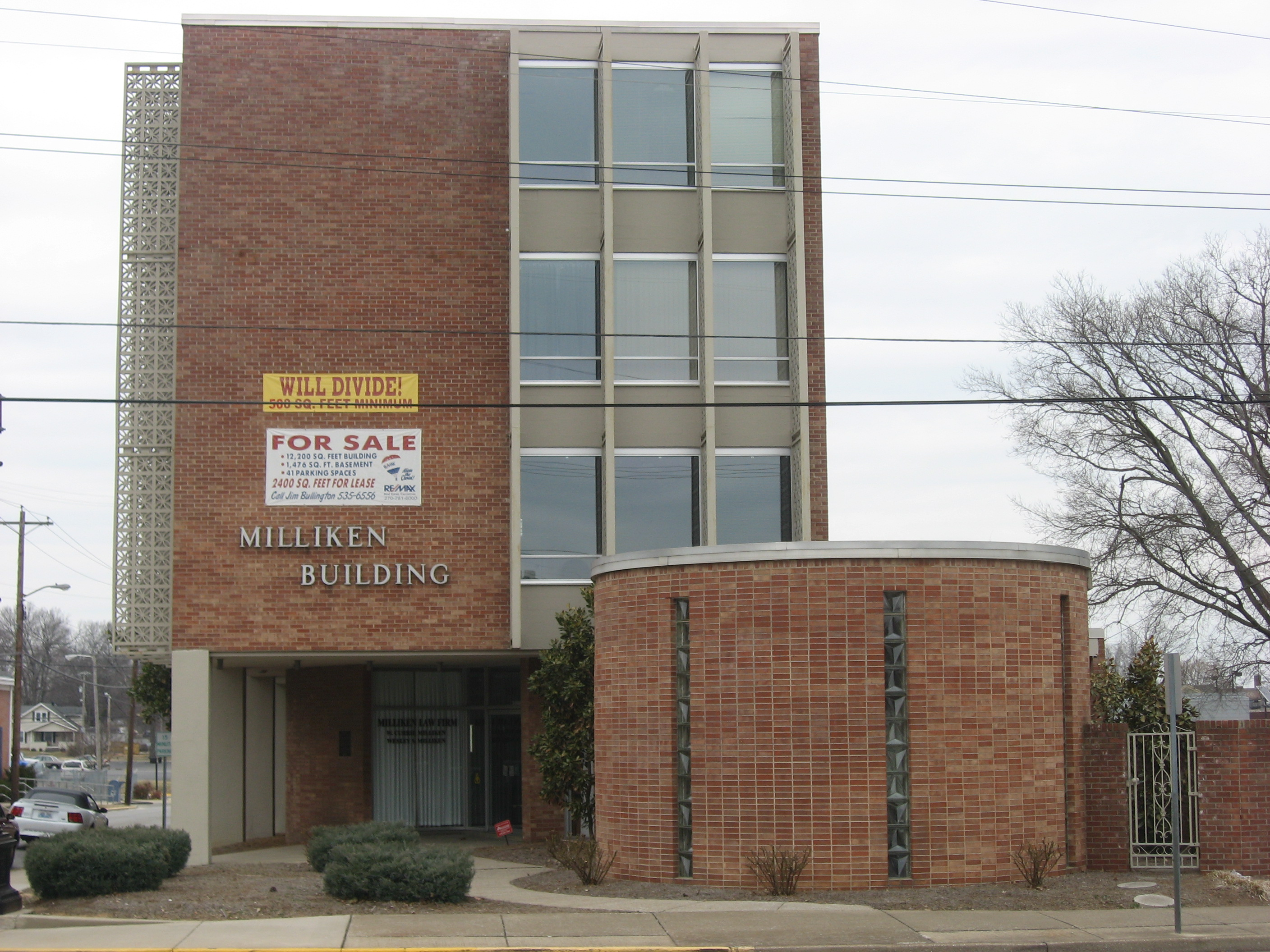
- Photographed in 2014

- Location within Kentucky Location within the United States
- Location: 1039 College St., Bowling Green, Kentucky
- Coordinates: 36°59′40″N 86°26′40″W
- Area: 0.5 acres (0.20 ha)
- Built: 1963
- Built by: Clarence Shaub
- Architect: Edwin A. Keeble
- Architectural style: International Style
- NRHP reference No.: 09001313
- Added to NRHP: February 3, 2010

The Milliken Building, located at 1039 College St. in Bowling Green, Kentucky, was completed in 1963. It was listed on the National Register of Historic Places in 2010.

It is an International Style building designed by Edwin A. Keeble. It is designated WA-B-127.

It is a four-story building.

It was listed for its design not its age.

Its style might better be termed Contemporary rather than International, in part due to its use of brick, according to one source focused upon the Modern Automotive District.

It was built by Clarence Shaub, a construction contractor.
