= Edwin A. Keeble =

American architect

- Born: August 18, 1905; Monteagle, Tennessee, U.S.
- Died: September 22, 1979 (aged 74); Sewanee, Tennessee, U.S.
- Resting place: Mount Olivet Cemetery
- Education: Montgomery Bell Academy; Vanderbilt University; École nationale supérieure des Beaux-Arts; University of Pennsylvania
- Occupation: Architect
- Spouse(s): Barbara McKelvey, Alice Beasley
- Children: 2 sons, 2 daughters
- Parent(s): John Bell Keeble; Emmie Frazer
- Relatives: Cornelia Keeble Ewing (sister); John Bell (maternal great-grandfather); Edwin Augustus Keeble (paternal grandfather)

Edwin Augustus Keeble (August 18, 1905 – September 22, 1979) was an American architect based in Nashville, Tennessee, who was trained in the Beaux-Arts tradition. Keeble designed a wide range of buildings, including residences, churches, hospitals, schools, military facilities, several of which are listed on the National Register of Historic Places. He is best known for Nashville's landmark Life and Casualty Tower built in 1957 which was the tallest commercial structure in the Southeastern United States at that time (31 stories). It reflected an architectural turn to modernism and was one of the first buildings emphasizing energy efficiency.

Keeble was also known for designing tall, slender church steeples, nicknamed "Keeble's needles" by architecture critics. He briefly taught architecture at the University of Pennsylvania before settling in Nashville. He was one of the founders of the "Nashville Architectural Studio" during the 1920s and 1930s, an organization that promoted architectural education and professional development. Keeble advocated for the creation of a school of architecture at Vanderbilt University, although the effort was unsuccessful.

== Early life ==
Edwin A. Keeble was born August 18, 1905, in Monteagle, Tennessee, a town on the Cumberland Plateau in the southeast corner of Tennessee on a direct path between Nashville and Chattanooga. Monteagle was the family's summer home, the primary home being Nashville. He was the fourth of six children and was the brother of Cornelia Keeble Ewing. (Note: The others were John Bell Keeble Jr., Sydney F. Keeble, David M. Keeble, Cornelia Keeble and Emmie Keeble.) His father, John Bell Keeble, was the dean of the Vanderbilt University Law School. His mother was Emmie Frazer. His maternal great-grandfather, John Bell, was a U.S. senator and was U.S. Secretary of War in 1841 under President William Henry Harrison. Bell was an 1860 U.S. Presidential candidate. Keeble's paternal grandfather, Edwin Augustus Keeble, was Speaker of the Tennessee House of Representatives, Mayor of Murfreesboro, and represented Tennessee in the Confederate Congress of 1864.

Keeble grew up in his father's house at 2114 West End Avenue in Nashville, across the street from the Vanderbilt University Campus— within sight of Kissam Hall. His early schooling was at the Wallace University School, which was a block from his house. His high school was Montgomery Bell Academy, where his father had attended; it was a straight three-mile trolley ride down West End Avenue. He graduated in 1921 and went on to Vanderbilt University, where he earned a bachelor's degree in engineering in 1924. He studied architecture at the University of Pennsylvania with Paul Philippe Cret, a Frenchman who had trained in Lyon and Paris in the Beaux-Arts tradition. This association influenced Keeble to spend the summer of 1926 studying in France at the Ecole des Hautes Etudes Artistiques at Fontainebleau. The next year he studied with Georges Gromort at the École nationale supérieure des Beaux-Arts in Paris. He then traveled through France and Italy observing architectural styles before returning to the University of Pennsylvania to complete his architecture degree in 1928.

== Early career ==
On completion of his studies, Keeble returned to Nashville and for a brief period, worked for architect Donald Southgate and for a Los Angeles architect named Kenneth McDonald Jr. In 1929 he joined Francis Bodie Warfield, forming the firm of Warfield & Keeble, with whom he practiced for the next 15 years . Warfield, known as "Dolly", graduated from Vanderbilt in 1915. He was about 14 years older than Keeble, and had served during the First World War in France with the 105th Engineers Corps. Warfield was primarily an engineer, and his major works were two housing projects, Cheatham Place and Andrew Jackson Courts; Vanderbilt University's Rand Hall (1952), the First Presbyterian Church, and the Springfield Woolen Mills. With Keeble, they designed McTyeire Hall in 1940 (Vanderbilt's first women's residence hall on campus) and Westminster Presbyterian Church. Warfield was a commissioner and Vice-Mayor of Belle Meade but had to resign in 1957 for health reasons before finishing his term. In 1964, Warfield was honored with a citation by the American Institute of Architects for his efforts "...to establish architecture as a significant art form".

Throughout the 1930s, their firm was quite active and they designed college dormitories, schools, churches and many private homes. When World War II was raging in Europe, Congress authorized the president to federalize the National Guard; as a result, National Guard Armories were needed on a grand scale. Warfield and Keeble received a commission from the State of Tennessee, with partial funding from the Works Progress Administration, to design and supervise the construction of National Guard Armories in six Tennessee cities: Columbia, Lawrenceburg, Cookeville, Shelbyville, Centerville and Murfreesboro. Each armory took a year or two to build and kept them busy up until the U.S. entry into the war.

Warfield and Keeble also designed houses like the P. D. Houston Jr. House in Forest Hills in 1941, which is listed on the National Register of Historic Places; but with the advent of the war, Keeble entered the military in 1944, at age 39, and this effectively dissolved their association. Stationed in Washington, D.C., Keeble served as a lieutenant in the United States Navy. He was assigned to the "Bureau of Ordnance" where he worked in the planning of rocket-producing plants, for which there existed no industrial precedent. The expertise developed during this led him many contracts for these facilities.

== Post-war career ==
=== Private homes ===
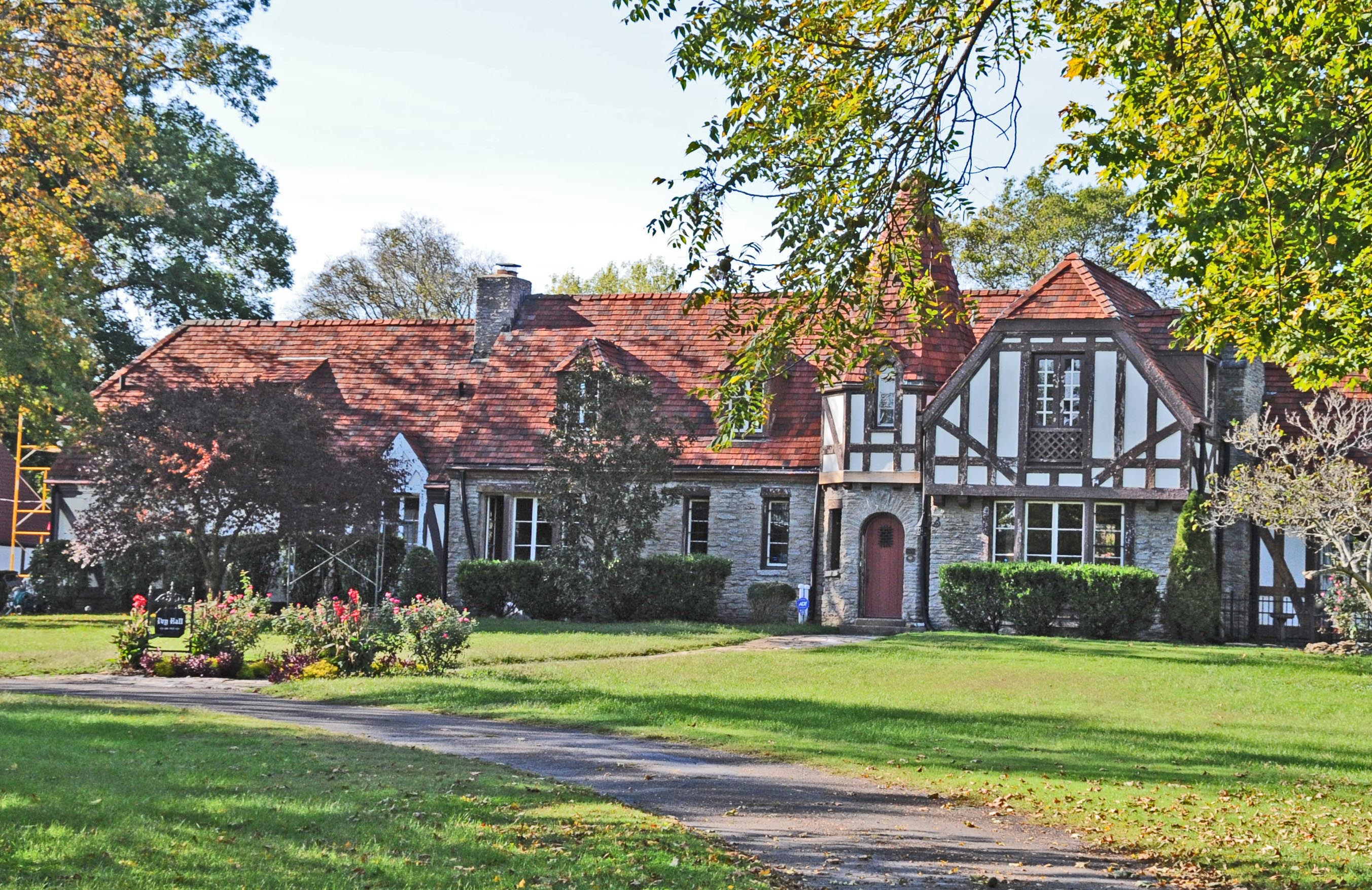
The Dr. Cleo Miller House, listed on the National Register of Historic Places.

After the war, in 1946, Keeble opened his solo practice, Edwin A. Keeble & Associates. He designed private residences and several are on the National Register of Historic Places. Examples are the Dr. Cleo Miller House at 1431 Shelton Avenue in Nashville, and the 4410 Truxton Place house in Belle Meade. The latter house was designed in the 1960s for Keeble's nephew, Sydney Keeble and is the "French Regency" style. According to the Nashville Post, the description, "It's a Keeble" is used as a symbol of added desirability in describing upscale Nashville homes. Keeble was quite busy during his prime years, with up to 100 projects per year. He designed seven houses, including his own, on Nashville's Stanford Drive, and the enclave was unofficially called "Keeble Heights". Here are selected examples of his private homes, all designed by Keeble unless otherwise noted; not intended to be complete:

- 5403 Stanford Drive, the Walter Stokes Jr. House, (1930), Colonial Revival Style, Forest Hills, Tennessee
- 30 Castlewood Court, the Richard E. Martin House (1931), Forest Hills, Tennessee (Warfield and Keeble), NRHP-listed
- 5134 Stanford Drive (1932)
- The Guilford Dudley Jr house, "Northumberland", Hillsboro Pike at Harding Place, Colonial Revival style
- John H. Dewitt Jr. home (now demolished), Stanford Drive, International Style
- 1431 Shelton Avenue (see photo), the Dr. Cleo Miller House, Tudor Revival style (1934–36), Nashville, Tennessee, NRHP-listed
- 5335 Stanford Drive, the Dr. Cobb Pilcher House, "Deepwood". This was one of the first Modernist homes in Nashville. (1936), Forest Hills, Tennessee (Warfield and Keeble), NRHP-listed
- 5401 Stanford Drive, the Dr. Frank Luton house, (1938), Country French
- 9205 Weston Drive, Maple Grove Farm, (1939), Brentwood, Tennessee
- 5405 Stanford Drive, the Edwin A. Keeble House. (1936) He designed his own house on Stanford Drive.
- 1301 Chickering Road, the William J. Tyne House (1936) demolished 2017.
- 1315 Chickering Road, Einer Nielsen house (1938), Forest Hills, Tennessee. Keeble added to it in 1978.
- 5617 Hillsboro Pike, the P.D. Houston Jr. House (1941), Forest Hills, Tennessee (Warfield and Keeble), NRHP-listed
- 4410 Truxton Place house, the Sydney Keeble house, French Regency style Belle Meade (1967)
- 5415 Stanford Drive (1970)
- 5400 Stanford Drive
- 5520 Stanford Drive
- 6129 Hillsboro Pike, The Snodgrass House, "Cedarwood" (1938) Colonial Revival style
- 114 Clarendon Ave, Nashville

Vine St. Christian Church, Nashville

=== Churches ===
Keeble designed churches in Nashville and elsewhere. Some include:

- Westminster Presbyterian Church, 3900 West End Ave, Nashville, (With Warfield), 1938; 150 foot steeple; cost, $137,000. Its significance was that it was the first classically-inspired Georgian church in Nashville (others were typically Romanesque or Gothic).
- Woodmont Christian Church, 3601 Hillsboro Pike, Neo-Classical style with a 220-foot spire, 1949; cost, $350,0000. The tall narrow steeple has been referred to as one of "Keebles needles" says architectural writer Trish Elston .
- Vine Street Christian Church (see photo) 4101 Harding Pike, Nashville, 1958; it features a 187-foot steeple and working shutters for the windows. During the construction, Keeble personally supervised the brickmasons to take five bricks from separate piles to minimize color variations; cost, $900,000.
- Nashville First Baptist Church at 7th and Broadway, Nashville (1970); Keeble had to please two factions of the congregation; preservationists cherished the existing 1886 Victorian Gothic design; others wanted to rebuild an entirely new church. Keeble elected to keep the original tower, which was achievable since the tower stood on its own foundation and to build a new structure partially around it. An architecture critic said the addition "did nothing to complement the powerful steeple"; cost, about $2 million. The main design inspiration for First Baptist Church, Nashville came from the completed 1962 Coventry Cathedral in Coventry, England. Most notable similarities are the tall, vertical windows on the North and South sides of the Sanctuary that go back through the Nave and the Schantz Pipe Organ with its stacked tiers of organ pipes, modeled after the 1962 Harrison and Harrison organ which is housed in Coventry Cathedral.
- Immanuel Baptist Church Belle Meade Boulevard, Nashville, Neo-Classical, 1954. It features an unusually tall steeple over a columned portico.
- Donelson Presbyterian Church, 2305 Lebanon Road, Nashville, (1952); cost, $85,000.
- First Christian Church, Glasgow, Kentucky
- Warren Chapel, Monteagle, Tennessee
- Bellevue Baptist Church, Memphis.

== Life and Casualty tower ==
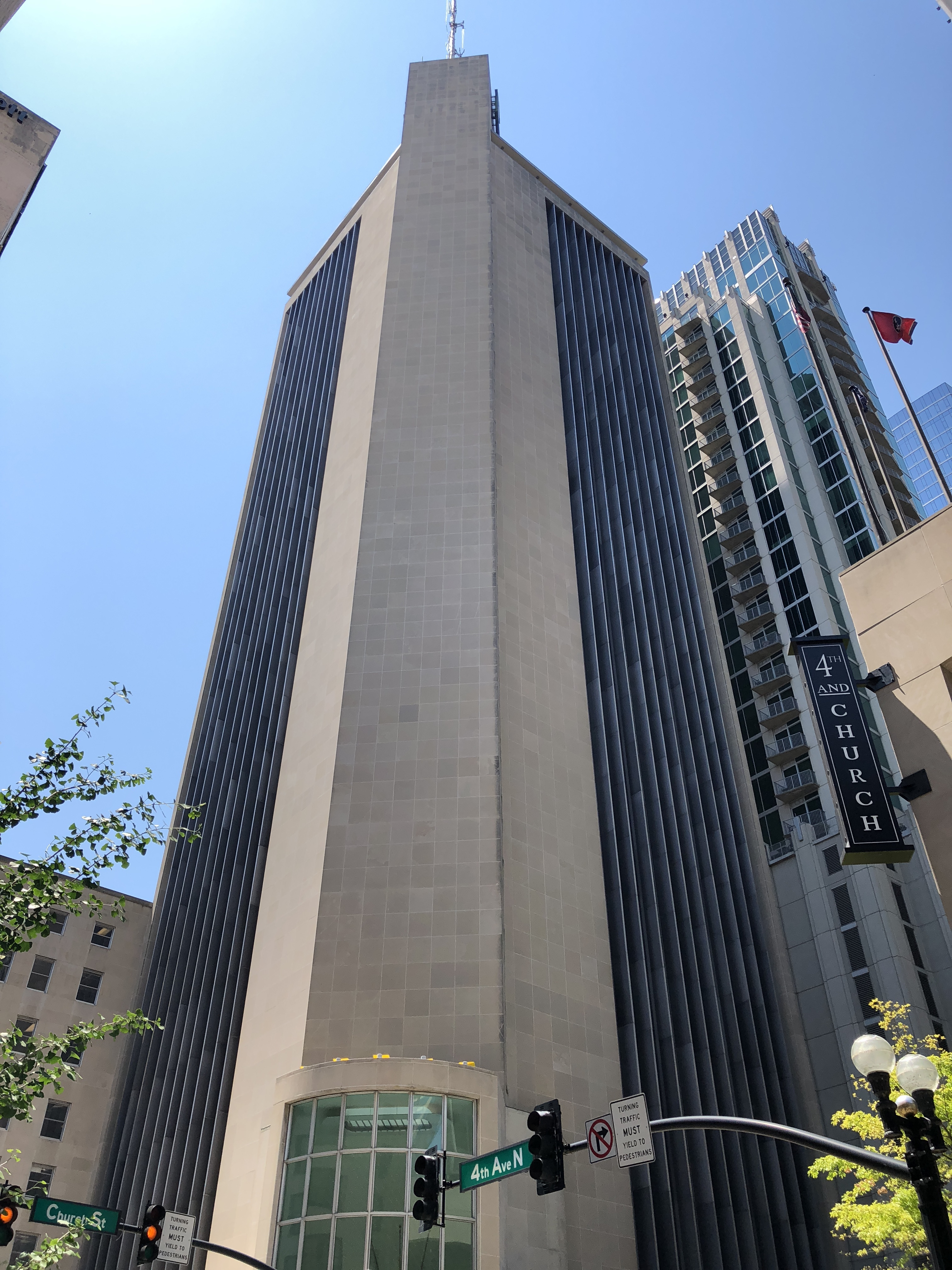
Life & Casualty Tower, Nashville, 2018

Keeble's best-known work is the Life & Casualty Tower in downtown Nashville, completed in 1957. Architecture critics have described it as "Nashville's first landmark" and said, "it was clearly the pivotal building on which the course of Nashville's architecture turned finally to modernism." USA Today (with input from the American Institute of Architects) named it as one of "The 25 must-see buildings in Tennessee" in 2017.

When completed, it was the tallest commercial building in the southeastern United States.

=== Design goals ===
In an article published in The Tennessean shortly before the building opened, Keeble explained the functional principles that guided the design, including the building's slender footprint, solar orientation, and column-free upper floors. His mission, as he described it, was to build a 409-foot tower providing light and a view; that only required one-fourth of the present property area; with enough office space to meet the company's need for 25 years.

Keeble used four-foot aluminum "fins" running the height of the façade (see photo) was designed to afford views but protect offices from direct sunlight. He consulted a Vanderbilt astronomer to map the site's solar exposure, maximizing winter sunlight while excluding direct summer sun after 9:30 a.m. and before 5:15 p.m. The design, now recognized as passive solar architecture, produced significant energy savings decades before energy conservation became a national concern. He said the aesthetic appeal of the fins is as "entirely incidental as it is welcome". He wanted to use even more aluminum in the structure, but limestone was needed for weight against wind pressure, and was less expensive.

The upper 20 floors were designed without internal columns, an uncommon feature in buildings of comparable height at the time. This required more steel and therefore higher cost, but created an additional 4000 square feet and more flexibility of arrangement without columns in the way. The building cost about six million dollars.

== Other designs ==
He designed buildings on the campus of his alma mater Vanderbilt University, like McTyeire Hall and Memorial Gymnasium. On the campus of Sewanee University, Keeble designed McCrady Hall, Hamilton Hall, and Cravens Hall. He was also the architect behind the Franklin County Airport in Sewanee. Outside Tennessee, Keeble designed the Milliken Building in Bowling Green, Kentucky, completed in 1963; it is listed on the National Register of Historic Places. Keeble designed the Veterans Administration hospitals in Nashville and Washington, D.C.

In 1970 Keeble retired, transferring his firm and its management to his long-time associates: Arnold Nye, William Lincoln, Louis C. Daugherty, Henry C. Waechter, and John F. Caldwell Jr. The new firm was named "Architect-Engineer Associates, Inc." Keeble remained a consultant.

Works include: (Keeble unless otherwise noted):

- Vanderbilt University Memorial Gymnasium
- Woodmont Terrace Apartments (1938–39), 920 Woodmont, Nashville, Tennessee (with Warfield), NRHP-listed
- Hillsboro High School (1954)
- Nashville Airport Terminal, "Berry Field"(1944)
- Franklin County Airport, Sewanee, Tennessee
- Life & Casualty Tower (1957), Nashville
- Milliken Building (1963), 1039 College St., Bowling Green, Kentucky, NRHP-listed
- Veterans Administration hospital, Nashville
- Peach Blossom Square, ten-home town house Development, Nashville
- Vanderbilt University, McTyeire Hall (1940), (with Warfield)
- U.S. Naval Reserve Training Center, Shelby Park, (1948). A pool was installed for "river assault boat training" and was used until 1961.
- Veterans Administration hospital, Washington, D.C.
- Numerous rocket and ammunitions plants around the U.S. for the Navy.

== Educational pursuits ==
Keeble briefly taught architecture at the University of Pennsylvania but when he moved to Nashville, he had a desire to raise the entire profile of architecture there. Early in his career, he felt that a prestigious school of architecture could be founded at Vanderbilt University; writing in a 1932 letter, he said "If we would realize our own strength and the possibilities of it, Southern architecture would follow Southern literature". Many young people who wished to study architecture came to him during the 1920s and 1930s. Rather than set them up in his office as apprentices, he did what his teacher Paul Cret had done and organized the "Nashville Architectural Studio". Working without pay, Keeble involved other architects in the teaching project including Edward E. Dougherty, Granbery Jackson Jr. and Henry C. Hibbs. Through Keeble's efforts, this group became associated with the Beaux-Arts Institute of Design in New York and was recognized as the institute's "Nashville Atelier". (Note: The official name was "The Nashville Atelier of the Beaux-Arts Institute of Design in New York") This meant that its students were able to transfer credits to almost any school of architecture in the United States. They met from 1930 to 1932 in a room provided by Vanderbilt University. Vanderbilt would not commit to the project to establish a school of architecture— a decision which, says Architecture historian Christine Kreyling, "still inhibits the seriousness with which the design of the built environment is taken in the city".

== Personal life ==
Keeble married Barbara McKelvey from Youngstown, Ohio, a graduate of Smith College, in 1936. She was studying music at Ward-Belmont in Nashville. They had a daughter, Kezia and a son, Edwin A. Keeble Jr. The junior Keeble, a Marine, was killed in the Vietnam War when his helicopter was shot down by enemy ground fire February 28, 1969. He had attended Deerfield Academy and had graduated from Princeton a couple of years prior. The daughter, Kezia Keeble was one of Vogue Magazine's youngest editors at age 24 and a founder of A New York public relations and advertising firm, Keeble, Cavaco, and Duka. The New York Times called Keeble "a shaper of American Fashion". She died of breast cancer at age 48.

Keeble married Alice Beasley on December 15, 1950, in LaGrange, Tennessee. They resided in a home he designed in the Classical Revival architectural style on Stanford Drive in Forest Hills, a suburb of Nashville. They had a son, Peter and a daughter, Lucy Keeble Wilkinson.

Edwin Keeble died on September 22, 1979, in Sewanee, Tennessee, at the age of 74. His funeral was held in the Warren Chapel (which Keeble designed) located at the Monteagle Sunday School Assembly in Monteagle, Tennessee, and he was buried in the Mount Olivet Cemetery in Nashville. Keeble's business associate in the 1930s, Francis B. Warfield died August 6, 1975, at age 84.
