= The Hibbettage =

Historic house in Tennessee, United States

- Hibbettage, The
- Formerly listed on the U.S. National Register of Historic Places
- Location within Tennessee
- Location: 2160 Old Hickory Boulevard, Nashville, Tennessee
- Coordinates: 36°3′12″N 86°51′56″W
- Area: 62.2 acres (25.2 ha)
- Built: 1948
- Architectural style: Colonial Revival
- NRHP reference No.: 98001305

Significant dates
- Added to NRHP: October 30, 1998
- Removed from NRHP: April 12, 2022

The Hibbettage was a historic mansion in Nashville, Tennessee, U.S.. It was built in 1938 for B. K. Hibbett. It was designed in the Colonial Revival architectural style by George D. Waller, who was inspired by The Hermitage. Construction was discontinued due to World War II, and it was resumed in 1948. It was listed on the National Register of Historic Places on October 30, 1998. The home was purchased in January 2020 for $11.4 million by David Bronson Ingram an American heir, businessman and philanthropist. He is the chairman and president of Ingram Entertainment, the largest distributor of DVDs and video games in the US. The Tennessean did a story on 11/25/2020 about how the historic preservation society took meaningful artifacts from the home before its demolition in 2020. The site was removed from the National Register in April, 2022
