= Forest Hills, Tennessee =

Forest Hills
- City
- Location of Forest Hills in Davidson County, Tennessee.
- Coordinates: 36°04′06″N 86°50′39″W
- Country: United States
- State: Tennessee
- County: Davidson

Government
  - Mayor: Kenny Griffin

Area
  - Total: 9.24 sq mi (23.93 km^{2})
  - Land: 9.24 sq mi (23.92 km^{2})
  - Water: 0 sq mi (0.00 km^{2})
- Elevation: 653 ft (199 m)

Population (2020)
  - Total: 5,038
  - Density: 545.5/sq mi (210.61/km^{2})
- Time zone: UTC-6 (Central (CST))
  - Summer (DST): UTC-5 (CDT)
- Postal codes: 37027, 37215, 37220
- FIPS code: 47-27020
- GNIS feature ID: 1269581
- Website: cityofforesthills.com

Forest Hills is an incorporated city in Davidson County, Tennessee that operates its own municipal government under a general law manager–commission charter. Although Forest Hills is within Davidson County, it is one of several smaller “satellite cities” that retain independent municipal governance rather than being fully governed by the Metropolitan Government of Nashville and Davidson County. When Nashville and Davidson County consolidated their governments in 1963 to create a single metropolitan government, cities such as Forest Hills were allowed to keep their existing charters and municipal authorities, including their own mayor and commissioners, while still cooperatively receiving certain services from Metro Nashville. The population was 5,038 at the 2020 United States census.

== History ==
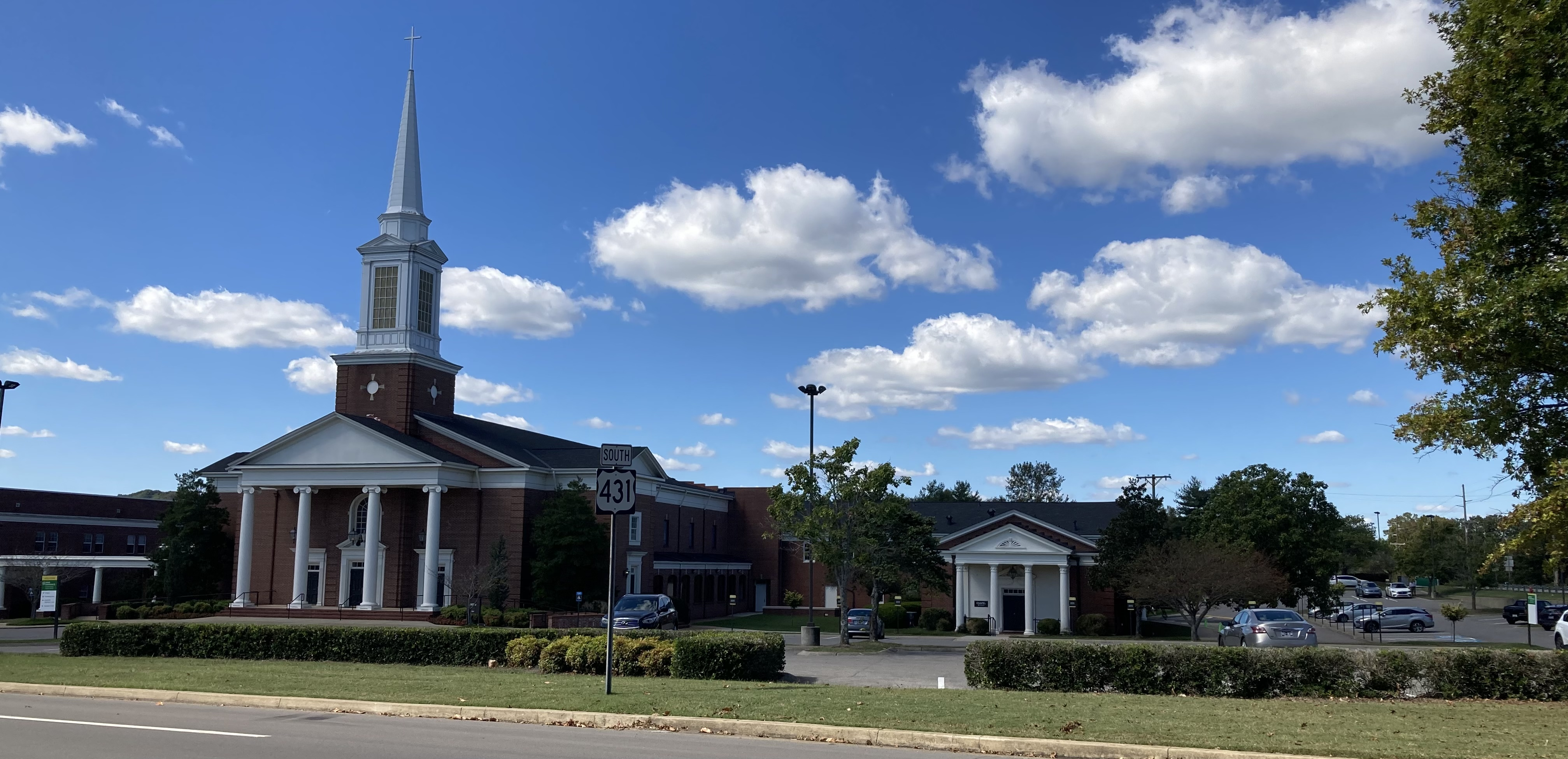
Forest Hills Baptist Church

Nashville was settled by Anglo-Europeans in 1780, and over the next two decades settlers staked claims on what was originally land cultivated and hunted by Native Americans. Several land grants were awarded to Revolutionary War veterans. The recipients of these grants seldom settled the land themselves, but either sold them to individuals or passed them along to their children or other relatives. In the Forest Hills area, William Nash received a 640-acre (2.6 km^{2}) grant along what is now Granny White Pike south of Tyne Boulevard. Nash opted to sell off parcels of his land, including a 160-acre (0.65 km^{2}) tract to Henry Compton in the early 19th century. Much of the land west of Hillsboro Road was part of a grant awarded to James Robertson.

A Revolutionary War veteran named McCrory chose to give his land grant to his son Thomas, who came to the area in 1790. The younger McCrory went on to acquire some 3,700 acres (15 km^{2}) in Davidson and Williamson counties, including land along what is now Old Hickory Boulevard. McCrory built a two-story log dwelling on this property in 1798. The property was purchased by William B. Carpenter in 1837, and his daughter and son-in-law Mary E. and George Mayfield inherited the house in 1869. It remained in the Mayfield family until 1939. This is the oldest building remaining in Forest Hills, and it was listed on the National Register of Historic Places in 1982.

As Nashville assumed prominence on the western frontier, a road known as the Natchez Trace was created to provide an overland route for settlers returning from New Orleans. Many settlers in the Ohio and Cumberland River valleys floated on rafts down the Mississippi River to New Orleans to sell their goods. Prior to the invention of the steamboat, western settlers had no choice but to walk home through the wilderness. To provide an improved route, the Natchez Trace was constructed from Nashville to Natchez, Mississippi.

Construction of the Natchez Trace began in 1802 and continued until it was officially declared complete in 1809. From the early 19th century through the 1820s, the Trace served as the primary north–south route through central Tennessee. With the advent of steamboat travel, its use declined significantly, and by the mid-19th century the old roadbed functioned largely as local farm roads. Various surveys and land records from the 19th century refer to the “Natchez Trace” or “Natchez Road” along at least three routes in Davidson County, two of which ran through Forest Hills. As National Park Service historian Dawson Phelps wrote in the 1940s, “All this has been very confusing to many Nashvillians who dabble in local history. Each has a definite idea that one or the other of the roads mentioned above is the Old Trace and is eager, at the drop of a hat, to defend his position obstinately, profanely, and at great length.” A later National Park Service study identified one of the primary routes as passing through what is now Forest Hills along either side of present-day Hillsboro Pike.

In northern Williamson County, the Natchez Trace crossed the Harpeth River near present-day Union Bridge Road. The Trace then turned north along what is now Stockit Road, where two branches diverged in the area now encompassed by Edwin Warner Park. One branch continued north along present-day Page Road and followed the route of State Route 100 (Harding Pike) to its terminus at Cockrill’s Spring in Centennial Park. The second branch ran east to present-day Hillsboro Pike, passed north of Otter Creek, recrossed Hillsboro Pike, and continued through Green Hills to Cockrill’s Spring. This route is shown on a National Park Service map prepared in 1935.

With declining use of the Natchez Trace, this roadbed became known as Compton Road, named for the prominent Compton family of the area. Shown on numerous 19th-century maps, Compton Road was distinct from Hillsboro Pike through Green Hills. Residential and commercial development obliterated most traces of the road north of Harding Place, though a small intact section remains just north of Woodlawn Drive.

Another route connecting Franklin to Nashville followed what was historically known as the Middle Franklin Turnpike, now Granny White Pike. This branch of the Natchez Trace left the main road at Leiper’s Fork and traveled east to Franklin before continuing north to Nashville.

Settlement in Forest Hills remained limited during the early 19th century due to the area’s steep, forested topography, which made large-scale farming difficult. Fertile bottomlands existed primarily along tributaries of Richland Creek and Otter Creek. Primary crops included oats, Indian corn, and potatoes, while livestock—especially swine and sheep—played a central role in the local agricultural economy. Wool production was common, while cattle were primarily raised for dairy rather than beef.

Members of the Compton family became among the area’s most influential landowners. William Compton, a cousin of Henry Compton Sr., established farms along Hillsboro Pike and later served under Andrew Jackson at New Orleans. His sons Felix and Henry W. Compton acquired extensive property holdings. In 1860, Felix Compton owned a 460-acre (1.9 km^{2}) farm and 300 acres (1.2 km^{2}) of woodlands valued at $40,000, producing primarily corn and oats along with swine and sheep. His Hillsboro Pike residence stood until the 1980s, when it was dismantled and relocated to Dickson County.

Henry Compton Sr. (1784–1873) settled in the area in 1806 and, following his marriage to Sarah Cox in 1815, established a 325 acres (1.32 km^{2}) farm in present-day Forest Hills. Around 1819, he constructed a two-story log dwelling near what is now Tyne Boulevard. By 1860, Compton owned approximately 900 acres (3.6 km^{2}) of improved land and 400 acres (1.6 km^{2}) of woodlands, with his farm valued at $195,000. His ca. 1819 log house and family cemetery remain extant at 1645 Tyne Boulevard.

William Scruggs established another prominent estate along Hillsboro Pike during the 19th century, eventually acquiring approximately 700 acres (2.8 km^{2}). His nephew Edward Scruggs inherited the property and later played a key role in the Hillsboro Turnpike Company, which constructed Hillsboro Pike. In 1890, Scruggs built an elaborate Queen Anne–style residence along Hillsboro Pike, which remains extant at 6251 Hillsboro Road (DV24931).

== Geography ==
Forest Hills is bordered by Old Hickory Boulevard on the south, Granny White Pike on the east, Harding Place (also known as Battery Lane) on the north, and Chickering Road/The City of Belle Meade on the west. The city hall is located within city limits, at the intersection of Hillsboro Pike and Old Hickory Blvd.

According to the United States Census Bureau, the city has a total area of 9.3 square miles (24 km^{2}), all land.

Like its neighbor, Belle Meade, it has distinct signage covenants concerning land size and use. Forest Hills is considered a "satellite city" of Nashville, and residents do not receive access to all city-county combined services, taking financial responsibility for some services like garbage collection on their own, while the city of Forest Hills provides other services, such as chipper service, road maintenance and stormwater management.

The area was developed as a suburb of Nashville in the wake of the post-World War II population and economic boom. Forest Hills was born as a result of the ensuing conflicts between suburban residents and Nashville city government as Nashville struggled to deal with the ramifications of suburban growth.

As its name implies, Forest Hills is composed primarily of steep wooded hills. These steep-sided hills were covered with forest until the early 20th century, when residential development extended south from Nashville. Several hills have water towers and cellular towers, and the WKRN and WNPT TV towers and the WSIX radio tower are located on a 1,114-foot (340 m) hill north of Old Hickory Boulevard. In addition to the area's many hills, the south-central section of the community contains what was originally fertile farmland within the Otter Creek watershed. This area supported numerous small farms during the 19th and early 20th century.

Nashville has enjoyed prosperity and growth during the past several decades, which is reflected in the development of Forest Hills. Since 1970, hundreds of dwellings have been built in Forest Hills, and the community no longer retains many tracts of open space or farmland. Most dwellings are sited on parcels of 1 acre (4,000 m^{2}) to 2 acres (8,100 m^{2}), and only a small number of houses are located on tracts of 10 acres (40,000 m^{2}) or more. Several of the community's hills and ridges — such as the properties along Laurel Ridge Drive and Fredericksburg Drive — also have been developed in recent decades.

== Demographics ==
Historical population
Census	Pop.	Note	%±
1960	2,101		—
1970	4,255		102.5%
1980	4,516		6.1%
1990	4,231		−6.3%
2000	4,710		11.3%
2010	4,812		2.2%
2020	5,038		4.7%

=== 2020 census ===
Forest Hills racial composition
Race	Number	Percentage
White (non-Hispanic)	4,638	92.06%
Black or African American (non-Hispanic)	44	0.87%
Native American	4	0.08%
Asian	110	2.18%
Other/Mixed	115	2.28%
Hispanic or Latino	127	2.52%

As of the 2020 United States census, there was a population of 5,038, with 1,796 households and 1,470 families residing in the city.

=== 2000 census ===
As of the census of 2000, there was a population of 4,710, with 1,729 households and 1,471 families residing in the city. The population density was 507.8 inhabitants per square mile (196.1/km^{2}). There were 1,791 housing units at an average density of 193.1 per square mile (74.6/km^{2}). The racial makeup of the city was 96.14% White, 1.40% African American, 0.06% Native American, 1.38% Asian, 0.40% from other races, and 0.62% from two or more races. Hispanic or Latino of any race were 0.76% of the population.

There were 1,729 households, out of which 36.3% had children under the age of 18 living with them, 79.4% were married couples living together, 3.9% had a female householder with no husband present, and 14.9% were non-families. 11.7% of all households were made up of individuals, and 6.0% had someone living alone who was 65 years of age or older. The average household size was 2.72 and the average family size was 2.96.

In the city, the population was spread out, with 25.8% under the age of 18, 3.5% from 18 to 24, 20.4% from 25 to 44, 34.3% from 45 to 64, and 15.9% who were 65 years of age or older. The median age was 45 years. For every 100 females, there were 97.5 males. For every 100 females age 18 and over, there were 95.8 males.

The median income for a household in the city was $124,845, and the median income for a family was $154,148. Males had a median income of $100,000 versus $41,125 for females. The per capita income for the city was $68,228, the second highest in the state after Belle Meade. About 1.2% of families and 1.7% of the population were below the poverty line, including 0.5% of those under age 18 and 3.6% of those aged 65 or over.

== Government and politics ==
=== Government ===
The city’s governing body consists of an elected Mayor and Board of Commissioners. Elections are nonpartisan and held in November of even-numbered years. Commissioners collaborate with the mayor to establish local policy and municipal governance.

Kenny Griffin serves as Mayor.

=== Political makeup ===
Forest Hills generally leans Republican in statewide elections.

Forest Hills Presidential election results
Year	Republican	Democratic	Third parties
2024	50.58% 1,665	47.75% 1,572	1.67% 55
2020	52.87% 1,669	45.58% 1,439	1.55% 49
2016	50.94% 1,546	42.90% 1,302	6.16% 187

== Historic properties ==
The growth and development of Forest Hills has resulted in the loss of most of the community's 18th- and 19th-century dwellings. Only a handful of properties dating from this early period remain extant. One of the most notable of these is the McCrory-Mayfield House at 1280 Old Hickory Boulevard, which was listed on the National Register of Historic Places in 1982. This two-story log dwelling was built circa 1798 and is the oldest remaining dwelling in Forest Hills.

Although 19th-century dwellings are rare, Forest Hills contains a number of significant houses built in the early 20th century. With improvements in automobiles and road systems, this section of Davidson County became a preferred area for country estates by the 1920s. Properties built along Hillsboro Pike mirrored those built in nearby Belle Meade as West Nashville became home to the area's most prosperous businessmen and professionals. Representative of this type of rural country home is Longleat at 5819 Hillsboro Pike, which was completed in 1932 as the home of insurance executive Thomas Tyne. Longleat was listed on the National Register in 1984 for its architectural significance. Another 20th-century home is "The Hibbettage" at 2160 Old Hickory Boulevard. Built in 1939, this two-story brick dwelling was constructed as a replica of The Hermitage; it was listed on the National Register in 1998 for its architectural significance.

== Education ==
Metro Nashville Public Schools is the school district.

Percy Priest Elementary School is in Forest Hills.
