= Longleat (Nashville, Tennessee) =

Historic house in Tennessee, United States

- U.S. National Register of Historic Places
- Location within Tennessee
- Location: 5819 Hillsboro Road, Nashville, Tennessee
- Coordinates: 36.07765°N 86.84161°W
- Area: 22.2 acres (9.0 ha)
- Built: 1932
- NRHP reference No.: 84003509
- Added to NRHP: February 16, 1984

Longleat is a historic house in Nashville, Tennessee, U.S.. It was built from 1928 to 1932 for Thomas J. Tyne. It was designed by architect Bryant Fleming. It has been listed on the National Register of Historic Places since February 16, 1984.
