= Franklin County Airport (Tennessee) =

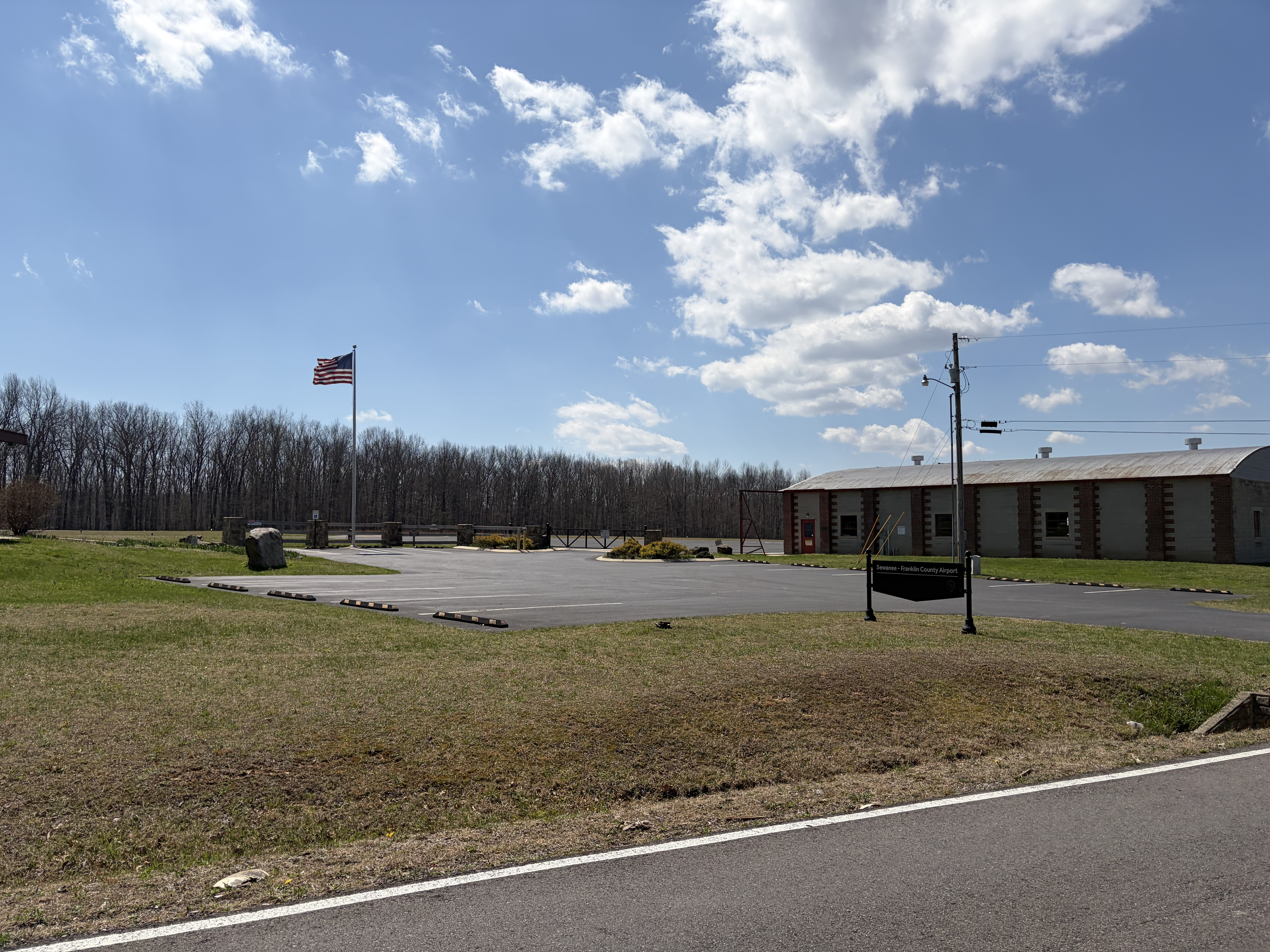
- IATA: UOS; ICAO: KUOS; FAA LID: UOS

Summary
- Airport type: Public
- Owner: Franklin County
- Location: Sewanee, Tennessee
- Elevation AMSL: 1,953 ft (595 m)
- Coordinates: 35°12′19″N 085°53′53″W

Map
- Location of airport in Tennessee UOS (the United States)

Runways
Direction	Length		Surface
Direction	ft	m	Surface
7/25	3,700	1,128	Asphalt

Statistics (2019)
- Aircraft operations: 1,800
- Source: Federal Aviation Administration

Franklin County Airport (IATA: UOS, ICAO: KUOS, FAA LID: UOS) is a public airport located one mile (2 km) east of the central business district of Sewanee, a census-designated place in Franklin County, Tennessee, United States. It is owned by Franklin County.

It is a general aviation airport located atop the Cumberland Plateau. The location is commonly referred to as Monteagle Mountain since it is near one of the most notoriously hazardous stretches of Interstate Highway in the United States where Interstate 24 crosses the plateau. The ICAO designation "KUOS" resulted from its proximity to the University of the South. Although the airport is named "Franklin County", it is referred to as "Sewanee" over the radio on Unicom 122.8.

== History ==
Franklin County was the home airport of late aviation legend Bill Kershner. He was one of the world's leading experts on spins and spin recovery and was known as the Spin Doctor in the aviation community.

The airport was designed by architect Edwin A. Keeble.

== Facilities and aircraft ==
Franklin County Airport covers an area of 70 acres (28 ha) which contains one asphalt paved runway designated 7/25 which measures 3,700 x 50 feet (1,128 x 15 m). For the 12-month period ending December 31, 2019, the airport had 1,800 aircraft operations, 100% of which were general aviation.

== See also ==
- List of airports in Tennessee
