= Edward T. Seay =

American politician

Edward Tucker Seay
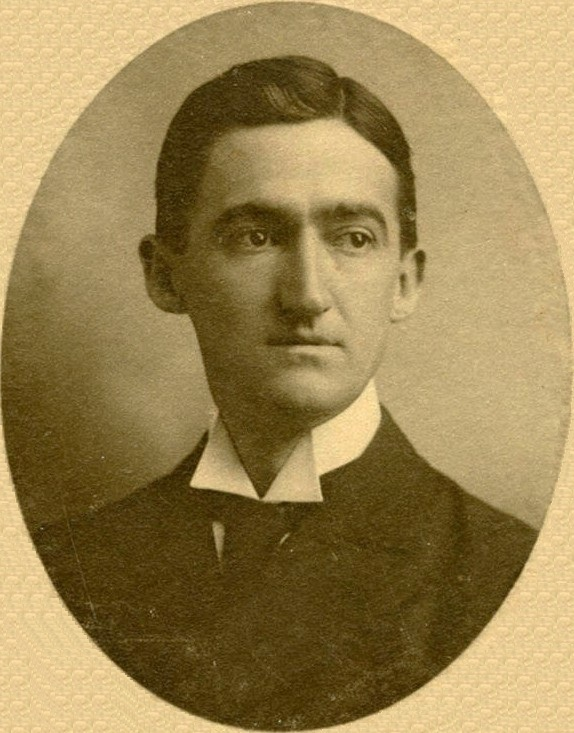
- Edward T. Seay in 1899
- Born: October 15, 1868; Hartsville, Tennessee, U.S.
- Died: August 19, 1941 (aged 72); Nashville, Tennessee, U.S.
- Resting place: Gallatin, Tennessee, U.S.
- Education: Vanderbilt University
- Occupations: Attorney, politician
- Known for: Speaker of the Tennessee Senate (1903–1905); Tennessee State Senator (1899–1905)
- Spouse: Polly Barr
- Children: 2 daughters

Edward Tucker Seay (October 15, 1868 – August 19, 1941) was an American lawyer and a politician. He served as the speaker of the Tennessee Senate from 1903 to 1905. He represented the Louisville and Nashville Railroad, and he was the acting dean of the Vanderbilt University Law School from 1929 to 1930.

== Early life ==
Edward Tucker Seay was born October 15, 1868, in Hartsville, Tennessee. His father, George Seay, was the chancellor of the district court of Sumner County, and Seay grew up in Gallatin. He graduated from Vanderbilt University, where he earned a bachelor of laws in 1891.

== Career ==
Seay began practising the law with Dismukes and Seay in Gallatin in 1891. He later joined Seay, Stockwell and Edwards. In 1907, he co-founded Keeble and Seay with John Bell Keeble. It later became Keeble, Seay, Stockwell and Keeble. He was also a "special judge" on the Tennessee Supreme Court and the Tennessee Court of Appeals. He represented the Louisville and Nashville Railroad throughout his career. He was also involved the Scopes Trial.

Seay was elected to represent Sumner, Macon and Trousdale Counties in the Tennessee Senate as a Democrat in 1898, serving from 1899 to 1905. He served as its speaker from 1903 to 1905.

Seay began teaching at the Vanderbilt University Law School in 1907. Shortly after John Bell Keeble's death in 1929, he became the acting dean, and he was succeeded by Earl C. Arnold in 1930. He was elected to Vanderbilt University's board of trust in 1937, and also served on the board of Fisk University.

== Personal life and death ==
Seay was married to Polly Barr, and had two daughters. He resided at 3702 Richland Avenue in Nashville. He was a member of the Vine Street Christian Church and the First Presbyterian Church. He was also a "32nd Degree Mason, a Shriner and a Knight of Pythias."

Seay died of a heart attack on August 19, 1941. He was buried in Gallatin, Tennessee.
