= Keebles Hut =

Alpine hut in New South Wales, Australia

- Interactive map of the Keebles Hut area

General information
- Coordinates: 36°22′09″S 148°10′28″E
- Year built: 1942

Keebles Hut is an alpine hut located in New South Wales, Australia. It is located in the Geehi flats area, north of Dead Horse Gap and a short walk from the main Geehi Hut and camp area.

The hut was built in 1942 by Snowy Miller, Alex Milovitch, Arthur Keeble and Dr Hubert Smith for Arthur and Flo Nankervis as a fishing lodge. It was constructed of River rocks in a similar fashion to Geehi Hut and YHA Hut.

The hut was resumed by the National Parks and Wildlife Service in 1970. Today the hut is a popular destination for day walkers hiking groups.
