= Keeble Observatory =

Observatory in Virginia, US

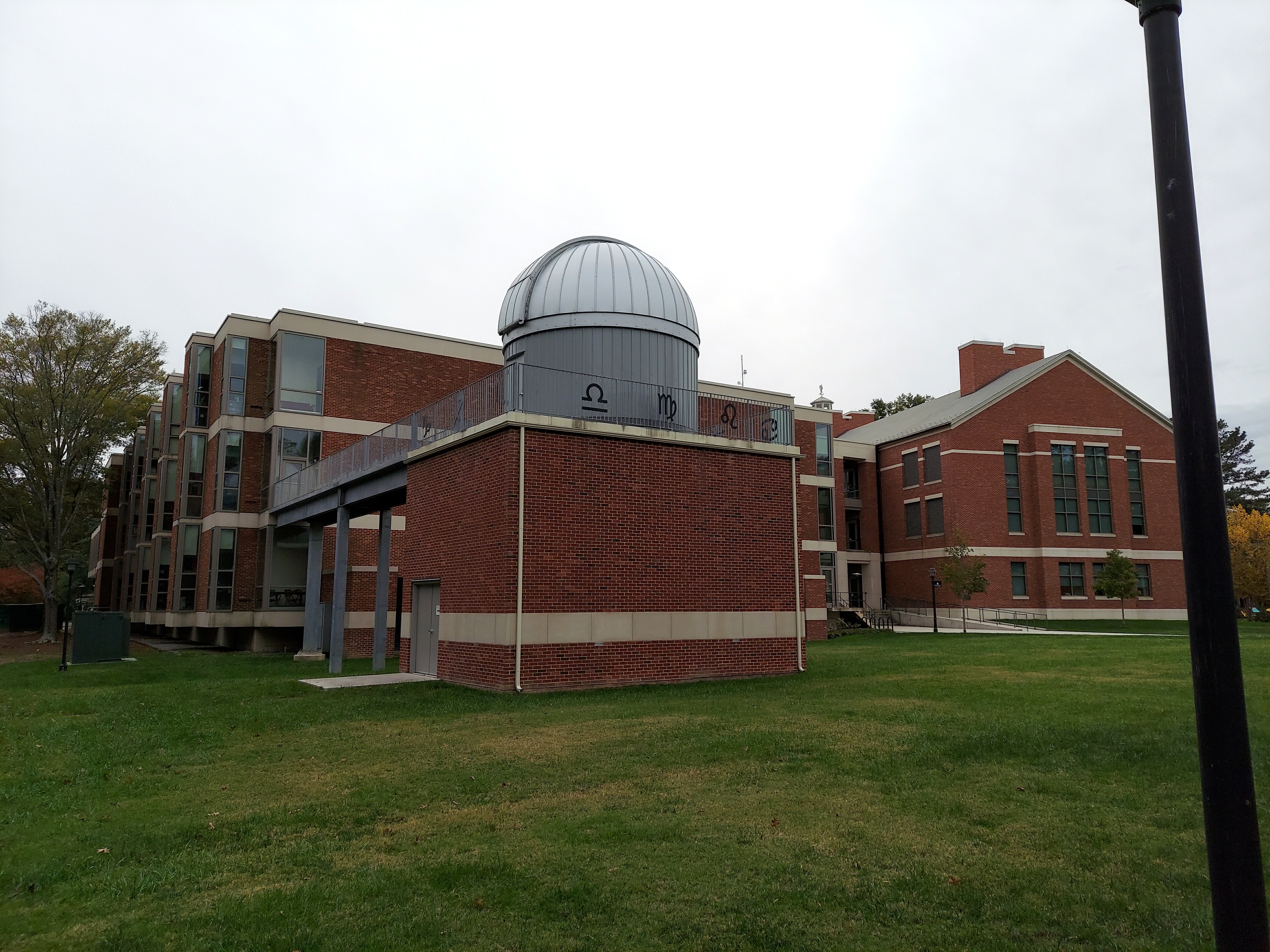
- Organization: Randolph-Macon College
- Location: Ashland, Virginia (USA)
- Coordinates: 37°45′44.6″N 77°28′31.4″W
- Established: 1963

Telescopes
- 1963 - 2016: 12-inch Newtonian
- 2017 - current: 40cm Ritchey-Chretien

Keeble Observatory, 2017

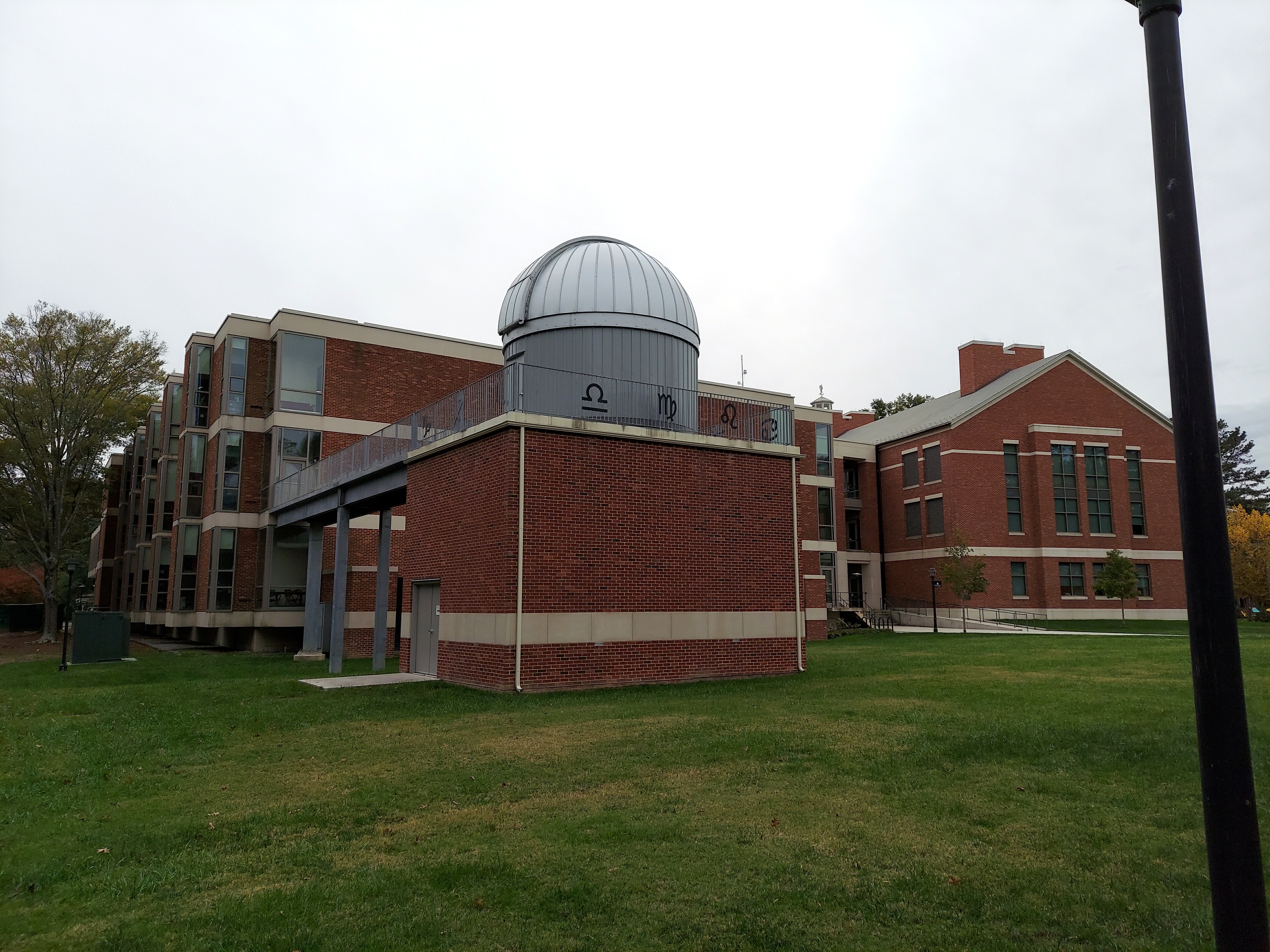
From the northeast

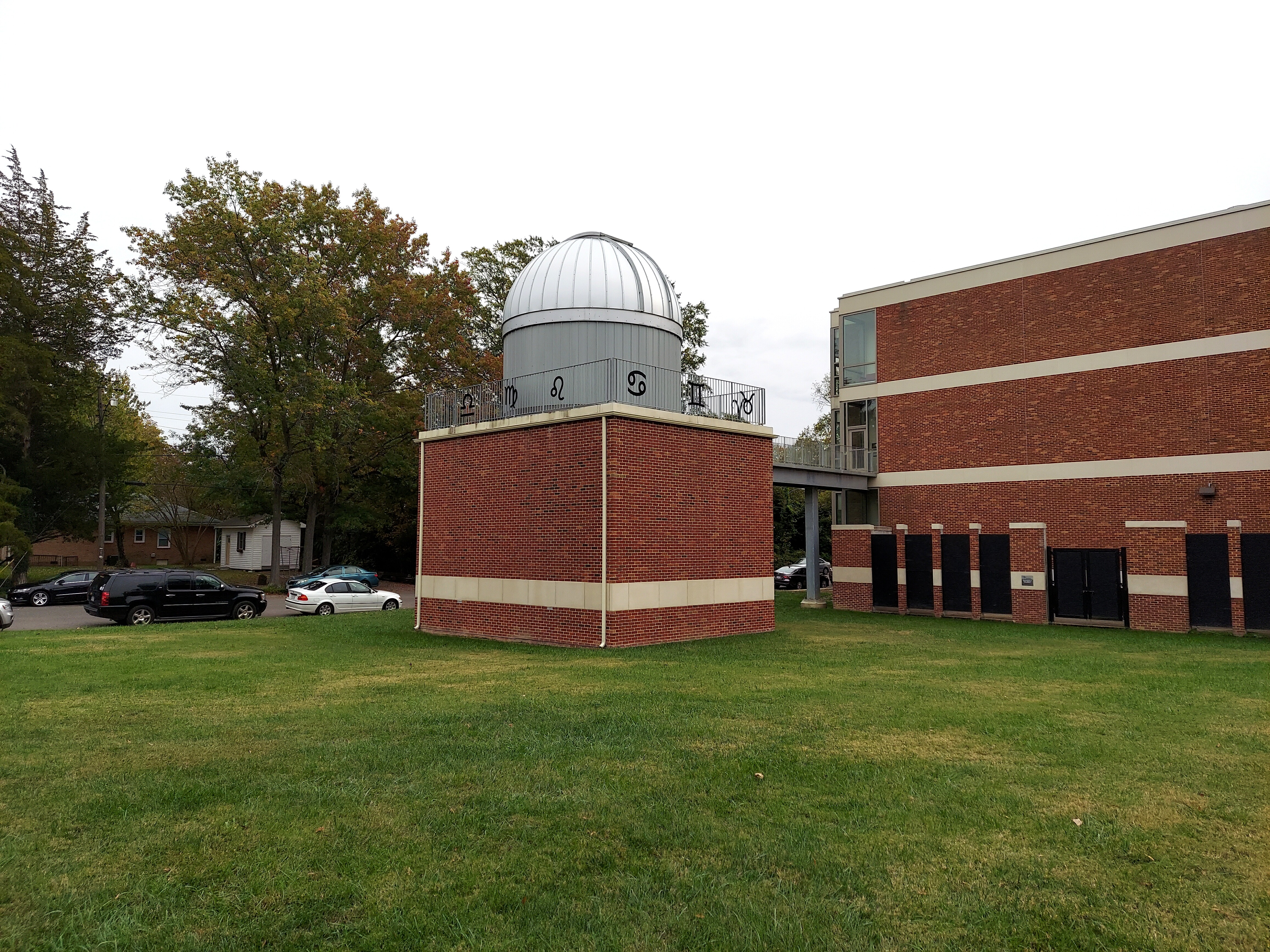
From the northwest

Keeble Observatory is an astronomical observatory owned and operated by Randolph-Macon College. It is located in Ashland, Virginia (USA), named for Dr. William Houston Keeble, distinguished Professor of Physics at Randolph-Macon College from 1919 until his retirement in 1952. He was a member of Phi Beta Kappa, the American Physical Society, the American Association of Physics Teachers, the American Astronomical Society, and was a fellow of the American Association for the Advancement of Science.

The first structure was opened in 1963 and housed a 12-inch Newtonian telescope. This building was razed in 2016. A new taller structure went into service the following year and houses a 40cm Ritchey-Chretien.

Original Keeble Observatory, 1963 - 2016

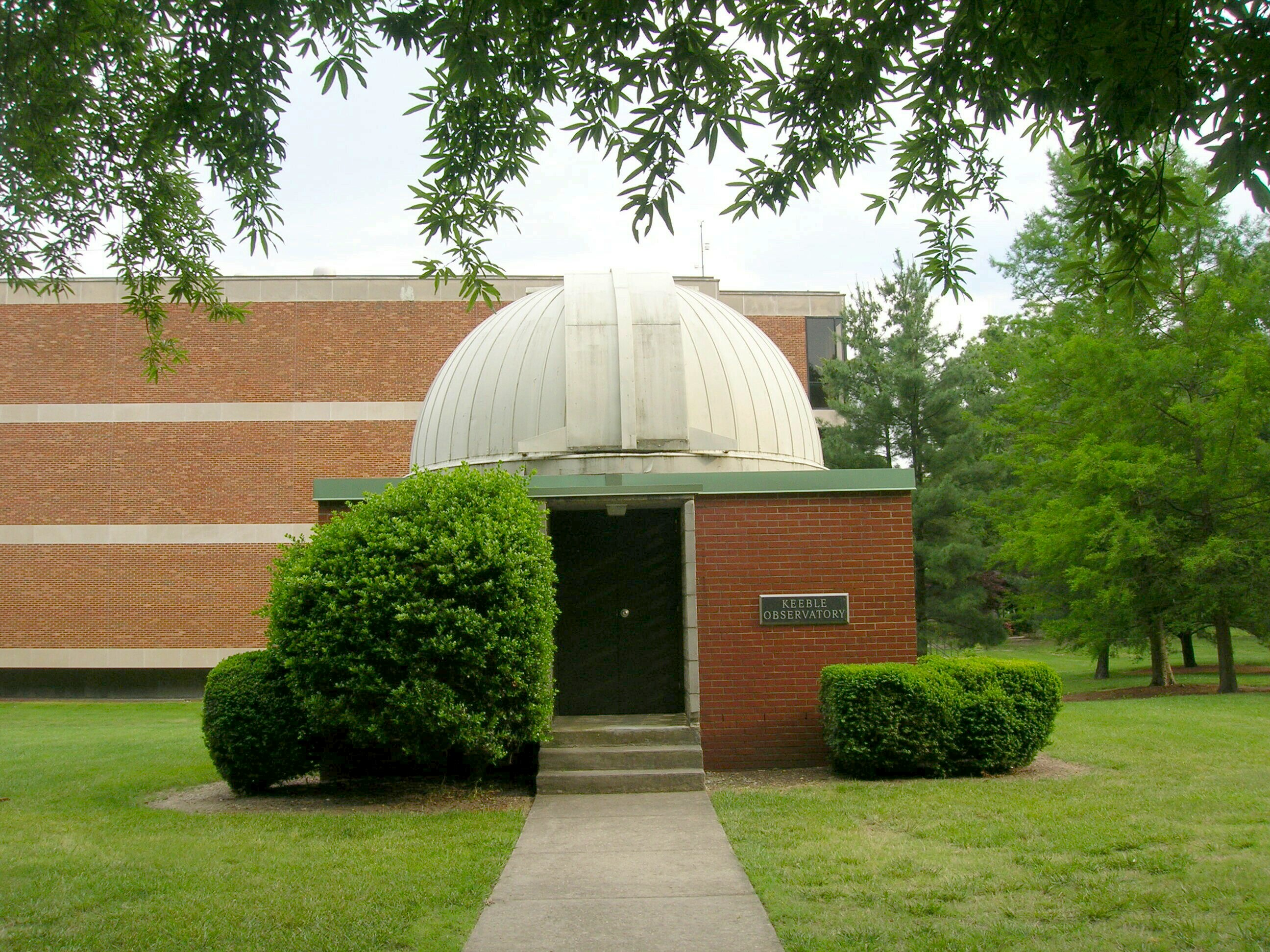
Front view

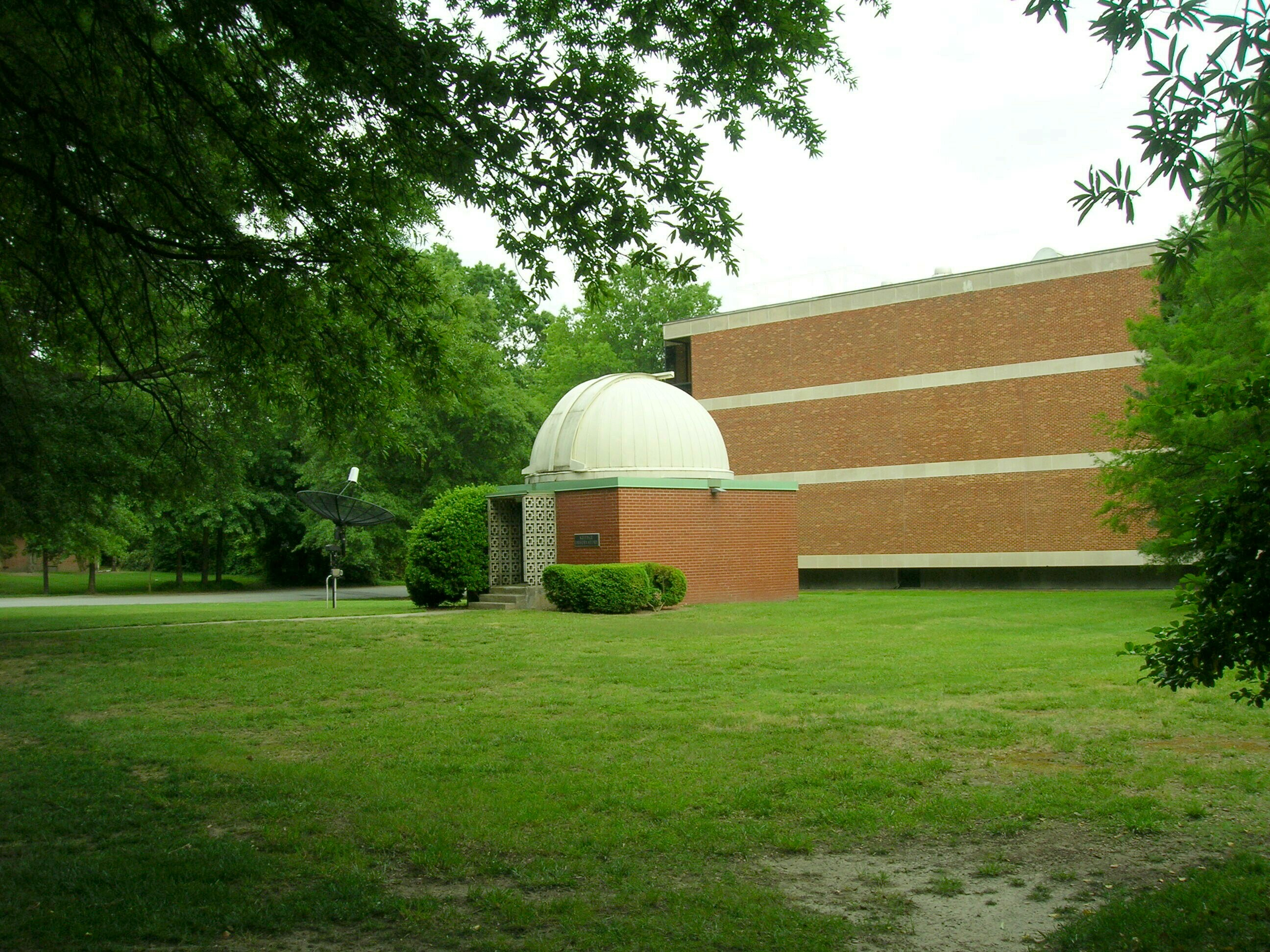
Oblique view showing 3-meter, 1.4 GHz radio telescope

== See also ==
- List of astronomical observatories
