= George Keeble =

English cricketer

George Keeble (26 September 1849 – 26 May 1923) was an English cricketer who played first-class cricket in a single match for Kent County Cricket Club in 1876. He was born at Southfleet in Kent and died at Dartford, also in Kent.

Keeble appeared as an umpire in matches in 1874, including the Gentlemen v Players game, one of the fixtures of the season. As a right-handed tail-end batsman and a right-arm fast bowler in the round-arm style, he played for Kent against Hampshire in 1876, scoring eight runs in all and taking a single wicket.

== Bibliography ==
- Carlaw, Derek (2020). Kent County Cricketers, A to Z: Part One (1806–1914) (PDF). Cardiff: ACS.
