= Cornelia Keeble Ewing =

American socialite and philanthropist (1898–1973)

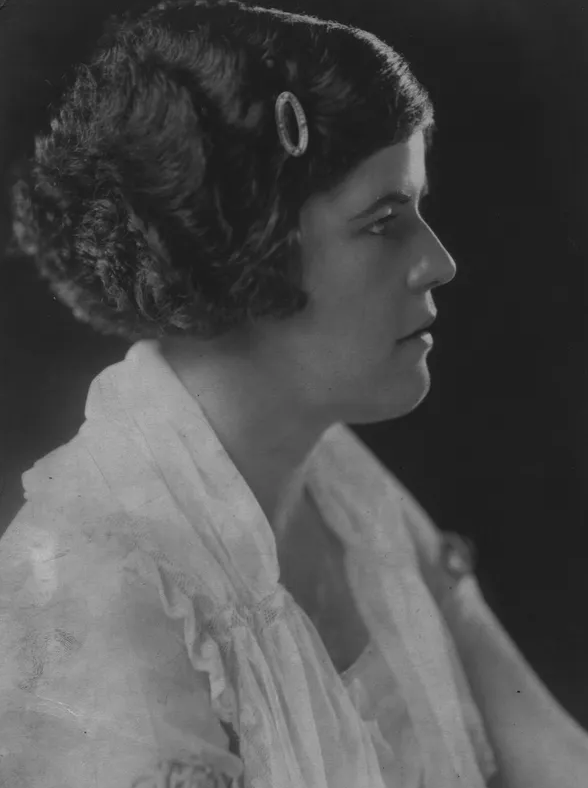

President of the Junior League of Nashville, Tennessee
- In office 1922–1924
- Succeeded by: Frances Dudley Brown

Personal details
- Born: March 6, 1898 Nashville, Tennessee, U.S.
- Died: December 20, 1973 (aged 75) Nashville, Tennessee, U.S.
- Resting place: Mount Olivet Cemetery
- Spouse: Andrew Ewing (1930–1973; her death)
- Children: 2
- Parent(s): John Bell Keeble; Emmie Frazer
- Relatives: Edwin A. Keeble (brother); Edwin Augustus Keeble (grandfather); John Bell (great-grandfather); David W. Dickinson (great-granduncle)
- Occupation: socialite, clubwoman, philanthropist

Cornelia Keeble Ewing (March 6, 1898 – December 20, 1973) was an American socialite, clubwoman, and philanthropist who founded the Junior League of Nashville, Tennessee in 1922. She served as president of the Junior League of Nashville from 1922 to 1924 and established The Junior League Home for Crippled Children, which became the Monroe Carell Jr. Children's Hospital at Vanderbilt.

== Early life and family ==
Ewing was born Cornelia Keeble on March 6, 1898, in Nashville, Tennessee to John Bell Keeble, an attorney who served as Dean of Vanderbilt University Law School, and Emmie Frazer. She had one sister and four brothers, including the architect Edwin A. Keeble. Ewing was the granddaughter of Edwin Augustus Keeble, who served as the mayor of Murfreesboro and as a member of the Confederate States Congress. She was a great-granddaughter of Senator John Bell, who served as U.S. Speaker of the House and Secretary of War, and a great-grandniece of Congressman David W. Dickinson.

== Junior League ==
Inspired by the activist Mary Harriman, Ewing founded the Nashville chapter of the Junior League, a women's volunteer organization, in 1922. The chapter was admitted into the Association of Junior Leagues that same year. It was the thirtieth chapter admitted. There were forty-six other charter members of her chapter. Ewing is reported to have said, "Nashville could use an equivalent dose of reality. They, too, could leave their antebellum homes and wisteria-draped patios and go forth to campaign for the greater good."

She served as the chapter's first president and hosted meetings at her home on 2114 West End Avenue. Her cabinet included Evelyn Douglas as vice president, Elizabeth Kirkland as recording secretary, Jeanette Sloan as corresponding secretary, and Mrs. Alec Stevenson as treasurer. Ewing served two terms as president of the Nashville Junior League, from 1922 to 1923 and from 1923 to 1924. She was succeeded by Frances Marion Dudley Brown.

In 1923, under her presidency, the Nashville League founded The Junior League Home for Crippled Children. They also established the Mental Health Guidance Center and the Nashville Children's Theatre.

== Personal life ==
She married the lawyer Andrew Ewing on June 14, 1930. They had two children, Elizabeth and Andrew. Her husband was the associate counsel of the Home Owners' Loan Corporation in 1933 and, during World War II, served as Chairman of the Davidson County Rationing Board. She died in 1973 and was buried at Mount Olivet Cemetery.
