= McCrory-Mayfield House =

Historic house in Tennessee, United States

- U.S. National Register of Historic Places
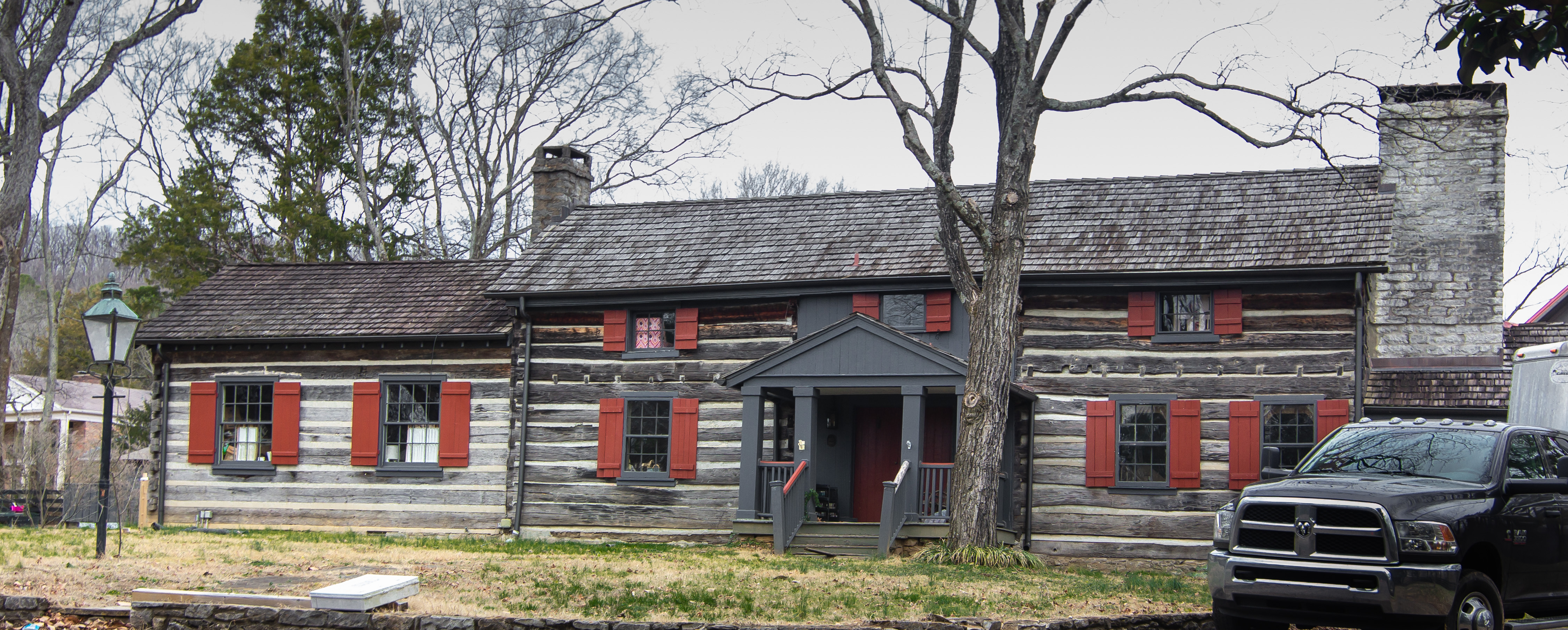
- McCory-Mayfield House

- Location within Tennessee
- Location: 1280 Hickory Blvd., Brentwood, Tennessee
- Coordinates: 36°2′31″N 86°49′41″W
- Area: 0.2 acres (0.081 ha)
- Built: 1798
- Architectural style: Pioneer
- NRHP reference No.: 82001726
- Added to NRHP: December 27, 1982

The McCrory-Mayfield House is a historic log house in Brentwood, Tennessee, U.S.. It was built in 1798 by Thomas McCrory, a settler and veteran of the American Revolution. Thomas came to Tennessee to claim some of the land granted by the United States government to his late father, Captain Thomas McCrory who died from wounds inflicted at the Battle of Germantown in 1777.

The land was later purchased by William B. Carpenter in 1837. After the American Civil War, it was inherited by his daughter Mary and her husband, George Mayfield, in 1869. It stayed in the Mayfield family until 1939. It has been listed on the National Register of Historic Places since December 27, 1982.
