= John Keeble (writer) =

Canadian-American author (born 1944)

John R. Keeble
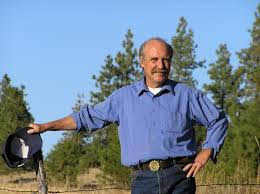
- John R. Keeble on August 8, 2014
- Born: John Robert Keeble; November 24, 1944 (age 81); Winnipeg, Manitoba, Canada
- Citizenship: Dual Canadian and United States
- Education: University of Redlands (BA); University of Iowa (MFA); Brown University
- Occupation: Writer
- Writing career
- Genres: Fiction, Nonfiction, Short Story
- Website: www.keeblefiction.com

John Robert Keeble (born November 24, 1944) is a Canadian-American author. Primarily a novelist, he is best known for his novels Yellowfish (1980) and Broken Ground (1987). He has also written short stories and nonfiction. In 2019, he won an O. Henry Award for his short story, "Synchronicity", which was published in Harper's Magazine.

Keeble is known for his literary treatment of political and ecological concerns, particularly in the western landscape of North America, as well as for his exploration of the intersections and tensions between the past and present of the American West and the people and animals who inhabit these spaces.

== Biography ==
Keeble was born in Winnipeg, Manitoba, Canada, and raised in Saskatchewan until his parents moved the family to California. The son of a minister, Keeble holds dual Canadian and U.S. citizenship. Keeble attended the University of Redlands (Bachelor of Arts, "magna cum laude", 1966), and the University of Iowa (Master of Fine Arts, 1969). Additionally, he attended Brown University for one year (1971/72). He began adult life as a musician, but turned seriously to writing while at the University of Iowa.

He has also worked as an educator, having taught at Grinnell College (1969–1972) and Eastern Washington University (1973–2002). At Eastern Washington University, he is presently Professor Emeritus. He was Distinguished Visiting Writer at Boise State University in the spring of 2006, and held the Coal Royalty Trust Chair in Creative Writing at the University of Alabama (Fall Semesters, 1992, 1998, 2002). He also served at Alabama as a Visiting Professor in 1995/96.

== Personal life ==
He is a longtime resident of Spokane County in Eastern Washington state where he and his wife, Claire, a musician, built their log home on a small farm. They have three sons and three grandchildren.

== Awards ==
His awards include a John Simon Guggenheim Memorial Foundation Fellowship, the Washington State Governor's Award, and Eastern Washington University Trustee's Medal for Teaching and Research (1980).

He was nominated in 1993 for a Northwest Regional Emmy for his writing of the documentary film To Write and Keep Kind, a biography of Raymond Carver, which won a Blue Ribbon at the American International Video Festival (1993) and First Prize in the Documentary Category at the New York Film Festival (1993).

He was nominated for a Pulitzer Prize for the piece "Black Spring in Valdez," written for The Village Voice about the Exxon Valdez oil spill in 1989; Keeble arrived at the site on April 8, 1989, and traveled back and forth from his home in Spokane County, Washington, to interview fishermen and Native Americans, public and corporate officials, and hundreds of scientists for the human-caused environmental disaster.

== Broadcast media ==
He was the script writer for To Write and Keep Kind, a documentary on the life of Raymond Carver funded by the National Endowment for the Arts and aired on Public Broadcasting System in 1992. He was later a literary consultant for Westword, a National Endowment for the Arts-funded documentary on Western Fiction Writing, which aired on the Public Broadcasting System in 1995.

== Selected works ==
Novels

- Crab Canon (1971) New York: Grossman Publishers
- Mine (1974, co-authored with Ransom Jeffery) New York: Grossman Publishers. ISBN 9780670476565
- Yellowfish (1980) New York: Harper & Row. ISBN 9780060122928
- Broken Ground (1987) New York: Harper & Row. ISBN 9780060158118 ; ' cited as one of the best hundred books in Literary Oregon, One Hundred Books, 1900-2000 (2005)
- The Shadows of Owls (2013) University of Washington Press. ISBN 9780295993157
- The Appointment: The Tale of Adaline Carson (2019) Lynx House Press.ISBN 978-0-89924-163-0

Short story collections

- Nocturnal America (2006) Lincoln : University of Nebraska Press. ISBN 9780803207080

Winner of the Prairie Schooner Book Prize in Fiction

Prize-winning short stories

- "The Fishers," Finalist, National Magazine Award for Short Fiction (1993)
- "The Chasm," Best American Short Stories (1994)
- "Synchronicity," The O. Henry Prize Stories (2019)

Nonfiction and Essays

- Out of the Channel: The Exxon Valdez Oil Spill in Prince William Sound (1991;Expanded and Revised Tenth Anniversary Edition, 1999) ISBN 9780060163341
- "Trejo's Perfect Havoc," in Ruben Trejo: Beyond Boundaries / Aztlán y Más Allá, edited by Ben Mitchell, University of Washington Press (2010) (memoir)
