= Edwin Augustus Keeble =

American politician

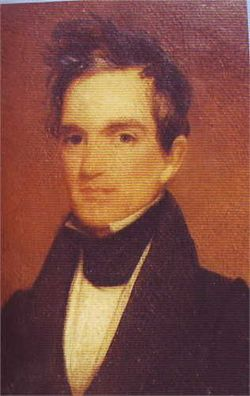
- Born: February 14, 1807; Cumberland County, Virginia, U.S.
- Died: August 26, 1868 (aged 61); Murfreesboro, Tennessee, U.S.
- Occupation: Politician
- Children: John Bell Keeble
- Relatives: Edwin A. Keeble (grandson); Cornelia Keeble Ewing (granddaughter); John Bell (father-in-law)

Edwin Augustus Keeble (February 14, 1807 – August 26, 1868) was a Tennessee politician who served in the Confederate States Congress during the American Civil War.

== Early life ==
Keeble was born on February 14, 1807, in Cumberland County, Virginia. He later moved to Rutherford County, Tennessee.

== Career ==
Keeble served as mayor of Murfreesboro from 1838 to 1855. He served in the Tennessee state legislature in 1861. He represented the 6th district of that state in the Second Confederate Congress from 1864 to 1865.

Keeble finished third in the election to represent the 6th district of that state in the First Confederate Congress, winning 8% of the vote, but carried the same district handily in the August 6, 1863, Tennessee congressional elections, defeating P.G. Stiver Perkins 11,631 to 950 and carrying the soldier vote 4,620 to 770. The 6th district was under Union occupation at the time of the election and civilian voting was done by refugees.

As was true of many congressmen whose districts were under Union occupation, Keeble was a strong supporter of the Davis administration, part of a voting bloc that approved "higher taxes that would not be levied on their constituents and for tougher conscription laws that would take no men from their districts."

== Personal life and death ==
Keeble married Sally Bell, the daughter of U.S. presidential candidate John Bell.

Keeble died on August 26, 1868, in Murfreesboro. He was buried in Rutherford County, and later re-buried in Mount Juliet, Tennessee.
