= John Bell Keeble =

American lawyer

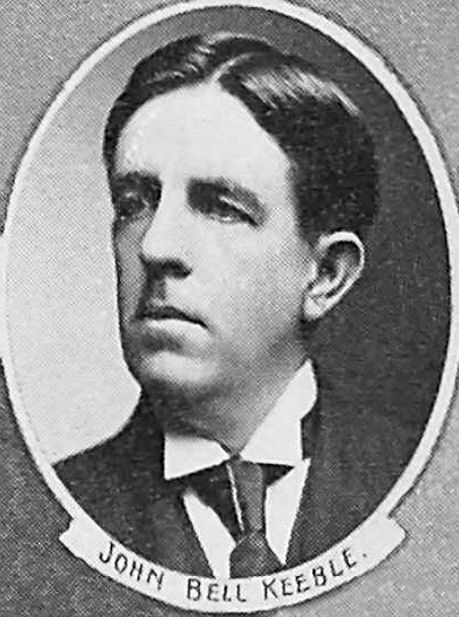
- 1909
- Born: May 13, 1868; Murfreesboro, Tennessee, U.S.
- Died: October 10, 1929 (aged 61); Nashville, Tennessee, U.S.
- Resting place: Mount Olivet Cemetery
- Education: Montgomery Bell Academy
- Alma mater: Vanderbilt University
- Occupations: Attorney, academic administrator
- Spouse: Emmie Frazer
- Children: 6 (including Edwin A. Keeble and Cornelia Keeble Ewing)
- Parent(s): Edwin Augustus Keeble; Sallie Dickson Bell
- Relatives: John Bell (maternal grandfather); David W. Dickinson (maternal great-uncle)

John Bell Keeble (May 13, 1868 – October 10, 1929) was an American attorney and academic administrator. He represented the Louisville and Nashville Railroad for 28 years, and he served as the dean of the Vanderbilt University Law School from 1915 to 1929.

== Early life ==
John Bell Keeble was born on May 13, 1868, in Murfreesboro, Tennessee. His father, Edwin Augustus Keeble, served in the Congress of the Confederate States during the Confederate States of America, and his maternal grandfather, John Bell, served as a United States congressman and senator.

Keeble was educated at the Montgomery Bell Academy in Nashville, and he graduated from Vanderbilt University, where he earned a bachelor of laws in 1888. When Chancellor Landon Garland invited John Sherman to speak on campus, Keeble led a pro-Confederate protest to the sound of Dixie.

== Career ==
Keeble began his career as an attorney in Nashville in 1889. He first worked alongside attorney Edwin E. Barthwell. He was also Nashville's city attorney from 1895 to 1897. In 1907, he co-founded Keeble and Seay with Edward T. Seay. It later became Keeble, Seay, Stockwell and Keeble.

Keeble represented the Louisville and Nashville Railroad from 1901 to 1929. He testified before the United States Supreme Court.

Keeble was the dean of the Vanderbilt University Law School from 1915 to 1929.

== Personal life and death ==
Keeble was married to Emmie Frazer; they had four sons (including architect Edwin A. Keeble) and two daughters (including Cornelia Keeble Ewing). They resided at 2114 West End Avenue in Nashville. Keeble was active in the Immanuel Baptist Church and the Monteagle Sunday School Assembly.

Keeble died of a heart attack on October 10, 1929, in Nashville, and he was buried in the Mount Olivet Cemetery.
