= Kennedy House =

Kennedy House or Kennedy Farm or Kennedy Cottage or Kennedy Mansion may refer to:

(by state, then city/town)

- Kennedy House, Chaura Maidan, Shimla, Himachal Pradesh, India
- Kennedy House (Abbeville, Alabama), listed on the National Register of Historic Places (NRHP) in Henry County, Alabama
- Kennedy House (Mobile, Alabama) — home of Joshua Kennedy and later the Merchant Navy Club of the Seamen's Church Institute of Mobile
- Dr. Walter Kennedy House, Sarasota, Florida, NRHP-listed
- Brown–Kennedy House, Carnesville, Georgia, listed on the NRHP in Franklin County, Georgia
- Archibald M. Kennedy House, Rushville, Indiana, listed on the NRHP in Rush County, Indiana
- Joseph Kennedy House, Shawhan, Kentucky, listed on the NRHP in Bourbon County, Kentucky
- Yenowine–Kennedy House, Jeffersontown, Kentucky, listed on the NRHP in Jefferson County, Kentucky
- Matthew Kennedy House, Lexington, Kentucky, listed on the NRHP in Fayette County, Kentucky
- Thomas Kennedy House (Carlisle, Kentucky), listed on the National Register of Historic Places in Nicholas County, Kentucky
- Thomas Kennedy House (Paris, Kentucky), listed on the National Register of Historic Places in Bourbon County, Kentucky
- Kennedy–Hunsinger Farm, Jeffersontown and Louisville, Kentucky, listed on the NRHP in Jefferson County, Kentucky
- Kennedy Farm, Samples Manor, Maryland, a National Historic Landmark
- Earl Roberts House, Colfax, Louisiana, also known as the Kennedy House, NRHP-listed
- John Fitzgerald Kennedy National Historic Site, Brookline, Massachusetts, NRHP-listed
- Kennedy Compound, Hyannis Port, Massachusetts, NRHP-listed
- Frederick A. Kennedy Jr. and Caroline Hewett, Farm, Hanover, Michigan, listed on the NRHP in Jackson County, Michigan
- Kennedy Hill Farm, Goffstown, New Hampshire, NRHP-listed
- Kennedy–Martin–Stelle Farmstead, Bernards Township, New Jersey, NRHP-listed
- Kennedy House and Mill, Kennedy Mills, New Jersey, NRHP-listed
- Hipp–Kennedy House, Penfield, New York, NRHP-listed
- Kennedy Cottage (Saranac Lake, New York), NRHP-listed
- Bruce–Dowd–Kennedy House, Carthage, North Carolina, listed on the NRHP in Moore County, North Carolina
- Kennedy Apartments and Commercial Block, Cleveland, Ohio, listed on the NRHP in Cleveland, Ohio
- Kennedy Stone House, North Salem, Ohio, NRHP-listed
- Kennedy Mansion (Okmulgee, Oklahoma), on the National Register of Historic Places listings in Okmulgee County, Oklahoma
- Kennedy Mansion (Valley Forge), Port Kennedy, Pennsylvania, listed on the NRHP in Montgomery County, Pennsylvania
- Francis W. Kennedy House, West Whiteland, Pennsylvania, NRHP-listed
- C. B. Kennedy Mansion, Canton, South Dakota, listed on the NRHP in Lincoln County, South Dakota
- James Kennedy House, Columbia, Tennessee, listed on the NRHP in Maury County, Tennessee
- Thomas P. Kennedy Jr. House, Forest Hills, Tennessee, listed on the NRHP in Davidson County, Tennessee
- Marshall W. Kennedy House, Houston, Texas, listed on the NRHP in Harris County, Texas
- R. A. Kennedy–J. M. Lowrey House, Lufkin, Texas, listed on the NRHP in Angelina County, Texas
- A. C. Kennedy–Runnells House, Lufkin, Texas, listed on the NRHP in Angelina County, Texas
- Kennedy–Lunsford Farm, Raphine, Virginia, NRHP-listed

== See also ==
- Thomas Kennedy House (disambiguation)
- Kennedy Building (disambiguation)
- Kennedy family
