= National Register of Historic Places listings in Henry County, Alabama =

Location of Henry County in Alabama

This is a list of the National Register of Historic Places listings in Henry County, Alabama.

This is intended to be a complete list of the properties and districts on the National Register of Historic Places in Henry County, Alabama, United States. Latitude and longitude coordinates are provided for many National Register properties and districts; these locations may be seen together in an online map.

There are four properties and districts listed on the National Register in the county.

This National Park Service list is complete through NPS recent listings posted October 23, 2026.

	Name on the Register	Image	Date listed	Location	City or town	Description
1	Headland Commercial Historic District	Headland Commercial Historic District	December 11, 2024 (#100011166)	Four blocks in downtown Headland centered around the Public Square; 31°21′07″N 85°20′33″W	Headland	
2	Kennedy House	Kennedy House	January 5, 1978 (#78000489)	300 Kirkland St. 31°34′02″N 85°15′03″W	Abbeville	This rare, dual front door, double pen Creole cottage was constructed c. 1840 and is the oldest remaining structure in Abbeville.
3	Oates House		March 17, 1989 (#89000164)	302 Kirkland St. 31°34′01″N 85°15′02″W	Abbeville	
4	Seaboard Coast Line Railroad Depot		September 4, 1980 (#80000687)	Broad St. 31°21′13″N 85°20′33″W	Headland	This building has been disassembled. No part of the structure survives.

== See also ==
- List of National Historic Landmarks in Alabama
- National Register of Historic Places listings in Alabama
