= Thomas Kennedy House =

Thomas Kennedy House may refer to:

- Thomas Kennedy House (Carlisle, Kentucky), listed on the National Register of Historic Places in Nicholas County, Kentucky
- Thomas Kennedy House (Paris, Kentucky), listed on the National Register of Historic Places in Bourbon County, Kentucky

== See also ==
- Kennedy House (disambiguation)
