= Seaboard Coast Line Railroad station =

Seaboard Coast Line Railroad station may refer to:

- Seaboard Coast Line Railroad station (St. Petersburg, Florida), a historic former train station in St. Petersburg, Florida
- Seaboard Coast Line Railroad Depot (Headland, Alabama), a historic former train station in Headland, Alabama
- Naples Seaboard Air Line Railway Station, or Seaboard Coast Line Railroad Depot, a historic former train station in Naples, Florida
- St. Petersburg station (Amtrak), or Seaboard Coast Line Railroad station, a former train station in St. Petersburg, Florida
- Sanford station (SunRail), formerly the Seaboard Coast Line Railroad station, a train station in Sanford, Florida
- West Palm Beach station, formerly the Seaboard Coast Line Railroad station, a train station in West Palm Beach, Florida
