= Headland, Alabama =

City in Alabama, United States

Headland
- City
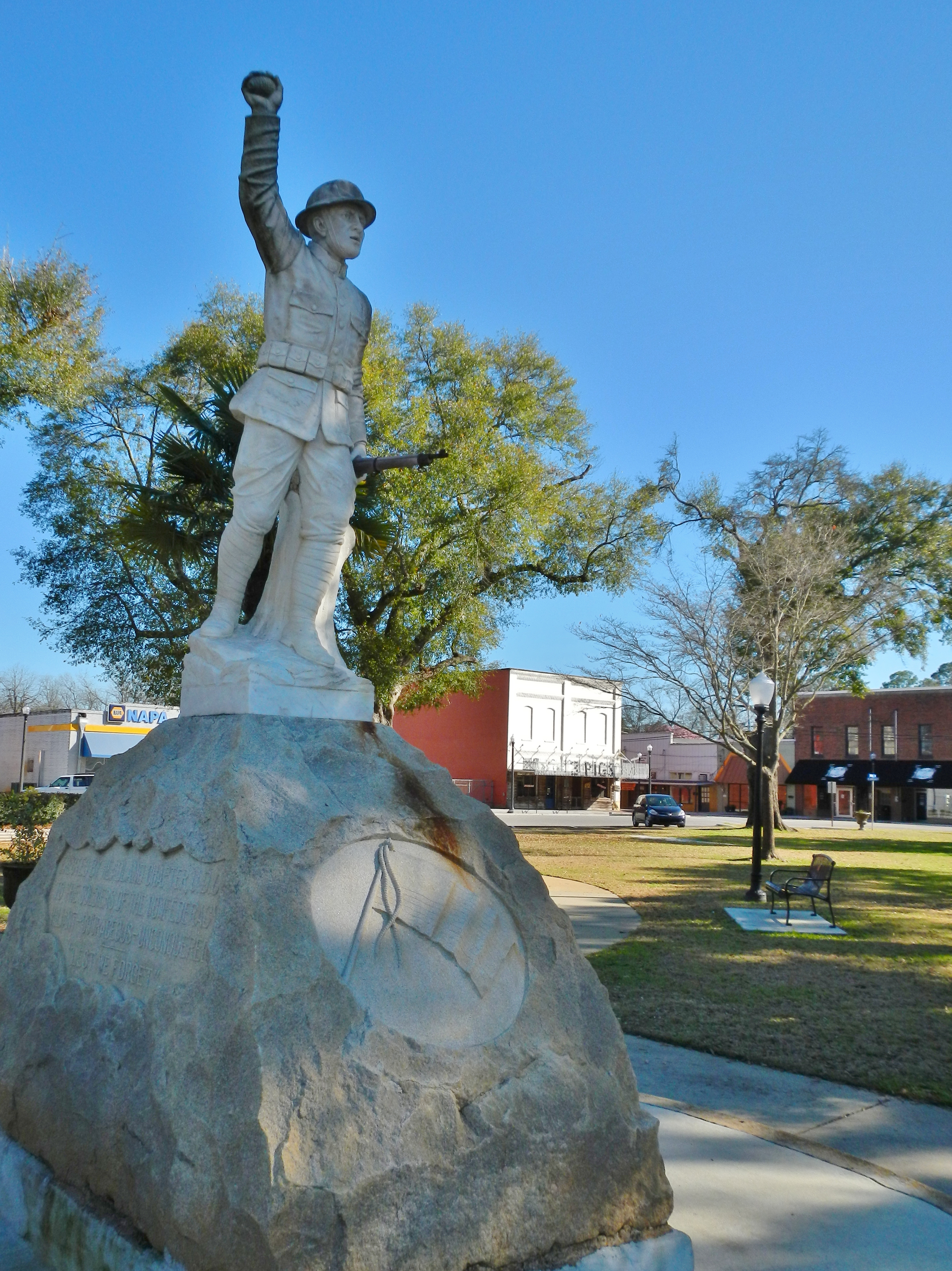
- This statue of a World War I doughboy, with his arm outstretched, honors all of Headland's military dead. It stands at the center of Headland Public Square.

- Logo

- Location of Headland in Henry County, Alabama.
- Coordinates: 31°21′12″N 85°21′23″W
- Country: United States
- State: Alabama
- County: Henry

Government
  - Mayor: Jody M. Singleton (R), 2025–present

Area
  - Total: 30.34 sq mi (78.58 km^{2})
  - Land: 30.33 sq mi (78.56 km^{2})
  - Water: 0.012 sq mi (0.03 km^{2})
- Elevation: 367 ft (112 m)

Population (2020)
  - Total: 4,973
  - Density: 164.0/sq mi (63.31/km^{2})
- Time zone: UTC−6 (Central (CST))
  - Summer (DST): UTC−5 (CDT)
- ZIP code: 36345
- Area code: 334
- FIPS code: 01-33856
- GNIS feature ID: 2404672
- Website: www.headlandalabama.org

Headland is the largest city in Henry County, Alabama, United States. It is part of the Dothan metropolitan area. In 2020, the population was 4,973, up from 4,510 in the 2010 census.

== History ==
James Joshua Head (1839–1927) founded Headland in 1871 as "Head's Land". He patented land, plotted the town and built his home there. The Headland post office opened on October 10, 1871.

The Headland Public Square was laid off in 1871 by Head with a vision for a branch courthouse. Henry County voters decided in the 1879 and 1885 courthouse site elections not to locate a courthouse on the public square. Henry has been Alabama's only county with three courthouses at the same time.

Head sold Headland to Hosey C. Powell in 1879, who sold to Dr. Wyatt S. Oates in 1880. Head moved to Tampa, Florida, in 1883 and later established Lake Magdalene, Florida.

Headland incorporated in 1884 with 26 white and 4 Black petitioners. The railroad was built in 1893 along with the Seaboard Coast Line Railroad Depot. The depot was added to the National Register of Historic Places on September 4, 1980. It has since been disassembled.

Headland's The Spirit of the American Doughboy statue was the first public statue in Henry County. It was erected on the square in 1926 as a tribute to the town's military dead. The square was paved in 1935.

As of the 1960 U.S. census, Headland had grown into Henry County's largest city, narrowly edging out Abbeville, which had been the largest since Dothan was removed into Houston County in 1903. Headland lost that distinction to Abbeville again in 1970, but regained it in 1980 and has since solidified its hold. In 2000, it broke Dothan's then-Henry County 1900 record of 3,275 residents with 3,523 and added nearly 1,000 more by 2010.

== Geography ==
Headland is located in the southwest corner of Henry County. It is bordered to the south by the city of Dothan and town of Kinsey in Houston County and to the west by Dale County.

U.S. Route 431, a four-lane highway, passes through the east side of Headland, leading south 10 miles (16 km) to the center of Dothan and north 18 miles (29 km) to Abbeville. Alabama State Route 134 runs through the center of Headland, leading east 16 miles (26 km) to Columbia next to the Georgia line, and west 10 miles (16 km) to Midland City.

According to the U.S. Census Bureau, Headland has a total area of 30.3 square miles (78.5 km^{2}), of which 0.01 square miles (0.03 km^{2}), or 0.03%, are water.

=== Climate ===
Headland has a humid subtropical climate (Köppen: Cfa) with long, hot summers and short, mild winters.

Climate data for Headland, Alabama, 1991–2020 normals, extremes 1950–2022
Month	Jan	Feb	Mar	Apr	May	Jun	Jul	Aug	Sep	Oct	Nov	Dec	Year
Record high °F (°C)	84 (29)	87 (31)	89 (32)	94 (34)	100 (38)	104 (40)	108 (42)	106 (41)	101 (38)	98 (37)	88 (31)	84 (29)	108 (42)
Mean maximum °F (°C)	76.0 (24.4)	78.9 (26.1)	84.1 (28.9)	88.2 (31.2)	93.5 (34.2)	97.3 (36.3)	98.0 (36.7)	97.5 (36.4)	94.9 (34.9)	89.3 (31.8)	82.5 (28.1)	77.9 (25.5)	99.1 (37.3)
Mean daily maximum °F (°C)	60.5 (15.8)	64.8 (18.2)	72.2 (22.3)	79.0 (26.1)	86.6 (30.3)	91.0 (32.8)	92.8 (33.8)	91.7 (33.2)	88.5 (31.4)	79.9 (26.6)	70.3 (21.3)	62.7 (17.1)	78.3 (25.7)
Daily mean °F (°C)	49.4 (9.7)	53.1 (11.7)	59.8 (15.4)	66.2 (19.0)	74.7 (23.7)	80.2 (26.8)	82.2 (27.9)	81.2 (27.3)	77.4 (25.2)	67.9 (19.9)	58.4 (14.7)	51.8 (11.0)	66.9 (19.4)
Mean daily minimum °F (°C)	38.2 (3.4)	41.3 (5.2)	47.4 (8.6)	53.5 (11.9)	62.8 (17.1)	69.4 (20.8)	71.6 (22.0)	70.6 (21.4)	66.2 (19.0)	55.9 (13.3)	46.5 (8.1)	40.8 (4.9)	55.4 (13.0)
Mean minimum °F (°C)	21.0 (−6.1)	24.8 (−4.0)	29.9 (−1.2)	38.7 (3.7)	48.7 (9.3)	60.9 (16.1)	65.8 (18.8)	63.7 (17.6)	54.3 (12.4)	38.7 (3.7)	28.6 (−1.9)	25.2 (−3.8)	18.4 (−7.6)
Record low °F (°C)	0 (−18)	10 (−12)	12 (−11)	27 (−3)	41 (5)	45 (7)	51 (11)	54 (12)	39 (4)	26 (−3)	15 (−9)	5 (−15)	0 (−18)
Average precipitation inches (mm)	4.80 (122)	5.15 (131)	4.83 (123)	4.61 (117)	3.65 (93)	5.16 (131)	6.73 (171)	5.07 (129)	4.59 (117)	3.16 (80)	3.87 (98)	5.10 (130)	56.72 (1,442)
Average snowfall inches (cm)	0.0 (0.0)	0.1 (0.25)	0.0 (0.0)	0.0 (0.0)	0.0 (0.0)	0.0 (0.0)	0.0 (0.0)	0.0 (0.0)	0.0 (0.0)	0.0 (0.0)	0.0 (0.0)	0.0 (0.0)	0.1 (0.25)
Average precipitation days (≥ 0.01 in)	10.5	9.7	8.9	7.4	7.5	12.0	13.6	12.6	7.8	6.2	7.8	9.6	113.6
Average snowy days (≥ 0.1 in)	0.0	0.1	0.0	0.0	0.0	0.0	0.0	0.0	0.0	0.0	0.0	0.0	0.1
Source 1: NOAA
Source 2: National Weather Service

== Demographics ==
Historical population
Census	Pop.	Note	%±
1900	602		—
1910	1,090		81.1%
1920	1,252		14.9%
1930	1,811		44.6%
1940	2,052		13.3%
1950	2,091		1.9%
1960	2,650		26.7%
1970	2,545		−4.0%
1980	3,200		25.7%
1990	3,266		2.1%
2000	3,523		7.9%
2010	4,510		28.0%
2020	4,973		10.3%
U.S. Decennial Census; 2013 Estimate

=== Racial and ethnic composition ===
Headland city, Alabama – Racial and ethnic composition Note: the US Census treats Hispanic/Latino as an ethnic category. This table excludes Latinos from the racial categories and assigns them to a separate category. Hispanics/Latinos may be of any race. Race and ethnicity were not reported in Alabama for populations under 2,500 in 1980 and under 1,000 in 1990.
Race / Ethnicity (NH = Non-Hispanic)	Pop 1980	Pop 1990	Pop 2000	Pop 2010	Pop 2020	% 1980	% 1990	% 2000	% 2010	% 2020
White alone (NH)	2,249	2,150	2,376	3,144	3,541	70.28%	65.83%	67.44%	69.71%	71.20%
Black or African American alone (NH)	938	1,087	1,099	1,223	1,168	29.31%	33.28%	31.20%	27.12%	23.49%
Native American or Alaska Native alone (NH)	0	2	7	16	6	0.00%	0.06%	0.20%	0.35%	0.12%
Asian alone (NH)	6	0	3	12	24	0.19%	0.00%	0.09%	0.27%	0.48%
Native Hawaiian or Pacific Islander alone (NH)	x	x	0	0	0	x	x	0.00%	0.00%	0.00%
Other race alone (NH)	0	0	0	4	15	0.00%	0.00%	0.00%	0.09%	0.30%
Mixed race or Multiracial (NH)	x	x	31	46	161	x	x	0.88%	1.02%	3.24%
Hispanic or Latino (any race)	7	27	7	65	58	0.22%	0.83%	0.20%	1.44%	1.17%
Total	3,200	3,266	3,523	4,510	4,973	100.00%	100.00%	100.00%	100.00%	100.00%

=== 2020 census ===
As of the 2020 census, Headland had a population of 4,973, 1,990 households, and 1,131 families. The median age was 40.5 years. 23.5% of residents were under the age of 18 and 18.7% of residents were 65 years of age or older. For every 100 females there were 88.4 males, and for every 100 females age 18 and over there were 83.8 males age 18 and over.

0.0% of residents lived in urban areas, while 100.0% lived in rural areas.

There were 1,990 households in Headland, of which 35.1% had children under the age of 18 living in them. Of all households, 48.4% were married-couple households, 14.4% were households with a male householder and no spouse or partner present, and 32.1% were households with a female householder and no spouse or partner present. About 25.2% of all households were made up of individuals and 12.3% had someone living alone who was 65 years of age or older.

There were 2,157 housing units, of which 7.7% were vacant. The homeowner vacancy rate was 3.1% and the rental vacancy rate was 4.9%.

=== 2010 census ===
As of the census of 2010, there were 4,510 people, 1,799 households, and 1,291 families residing in the city. The population density was 281.9 inhabitants per square mile (108.8/km^{2}). There were 1,949 housing units at an average density of 121.8 per square mile (47.0/km^{2}). The racial makeup of the city was 70.1% White, 27.5% Black or African American, 0.4% Native American, 0.3% Asian, 0.6% from other races, and 1.2% from two or more races. 1.4% of the population were Hispanic or Latino of any race.

There were 1,799 households, out of which 30.1% had children under the age of 18 living with them, 50.1% were married couples living together, 17.7% had a female householder with no husband present, and 28.2% were non-families. 25.3% of all households were made up of individuals, and 12.3% had someone living alone who was 65 years of age or older. The average household size was 2.50 and the average family size was 2.99.

In the city, the age distribution of the population shows 25.6% under the age of 18, 6.7% from 18 to 24, 26.6% from 25 to 44, 27.0% from 45 to 64, and 14.1% who were 65 years of age or older. The median age was 38.3 years. For every 100 females, there were 83.7 males. For every 100 females age 18 and over, there were 82.9 males.

The median income for a household in the city was $45,813, and the median income for a family was $50,120. Males had a median income of $37,025 versus $30,734 for females. The per capita income for the city was $20,304. About 13.6% of families and 12.1% of the population were below the poverty line, including 8.7% of those under age 18 and 20.7% of those age 65 or over.

== Education ==
Headland is a part of the Henry County Public Schools system. It operates Headland Elementary School (K-5), Headland Middle School (6-9) and Headland High School (10-12).

== Sports ==
Headland was home to the Headland Dixie Runners, a Minor League Baseball team in the Alabama State League/Alabama–Florida League from 1950 to 1952.

Headland was also the home to the 2016 Dixie Youth Baseball World Champions.

== Notable people ==
- M. Watt Espy, death penalty historian
- W. Thomas West, former major general in the U.S. Air Force
- Charles Woods, businessman and political candidate

== Photo gallery ==
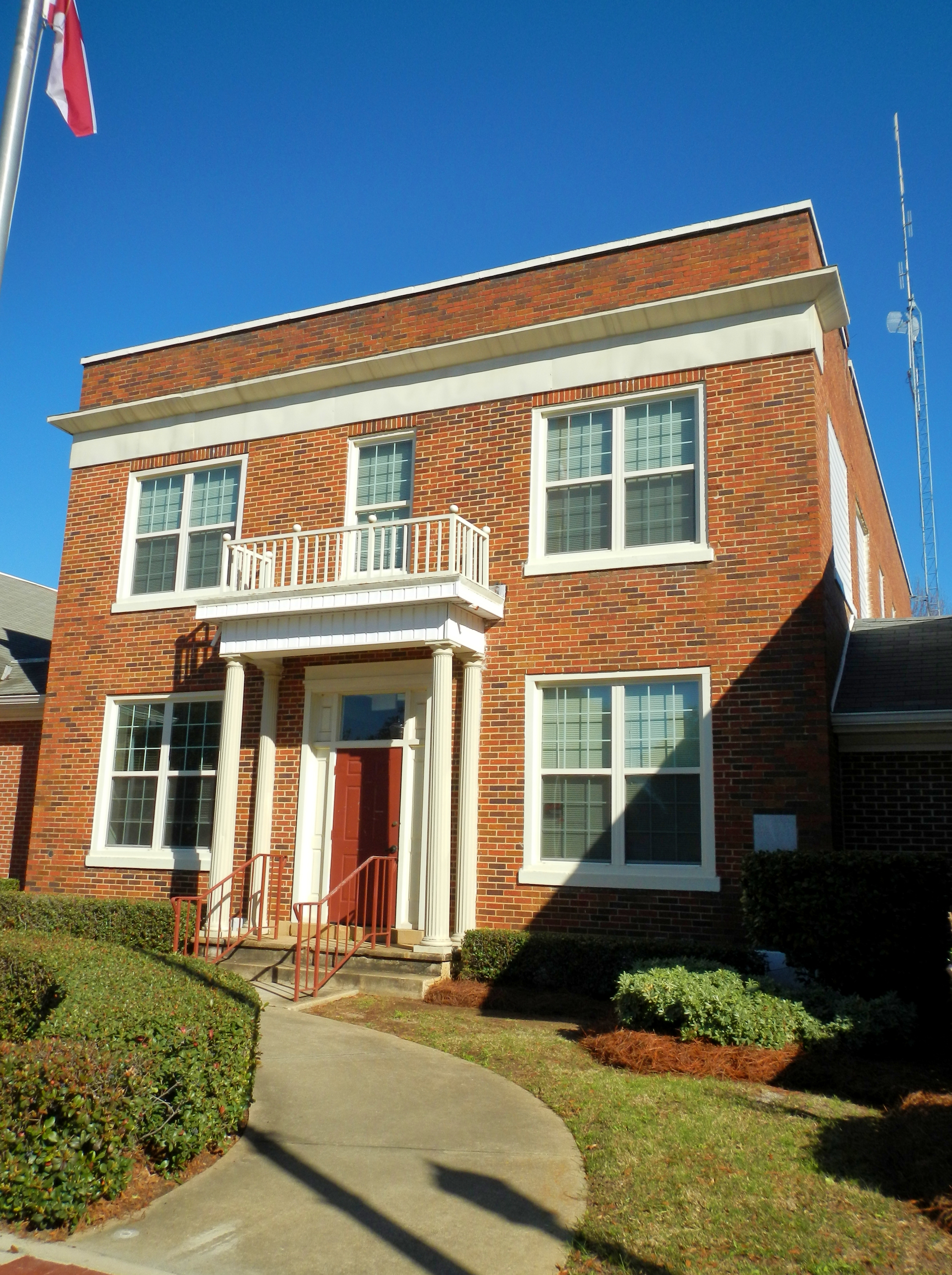
Headland City Hall (erected 1930)

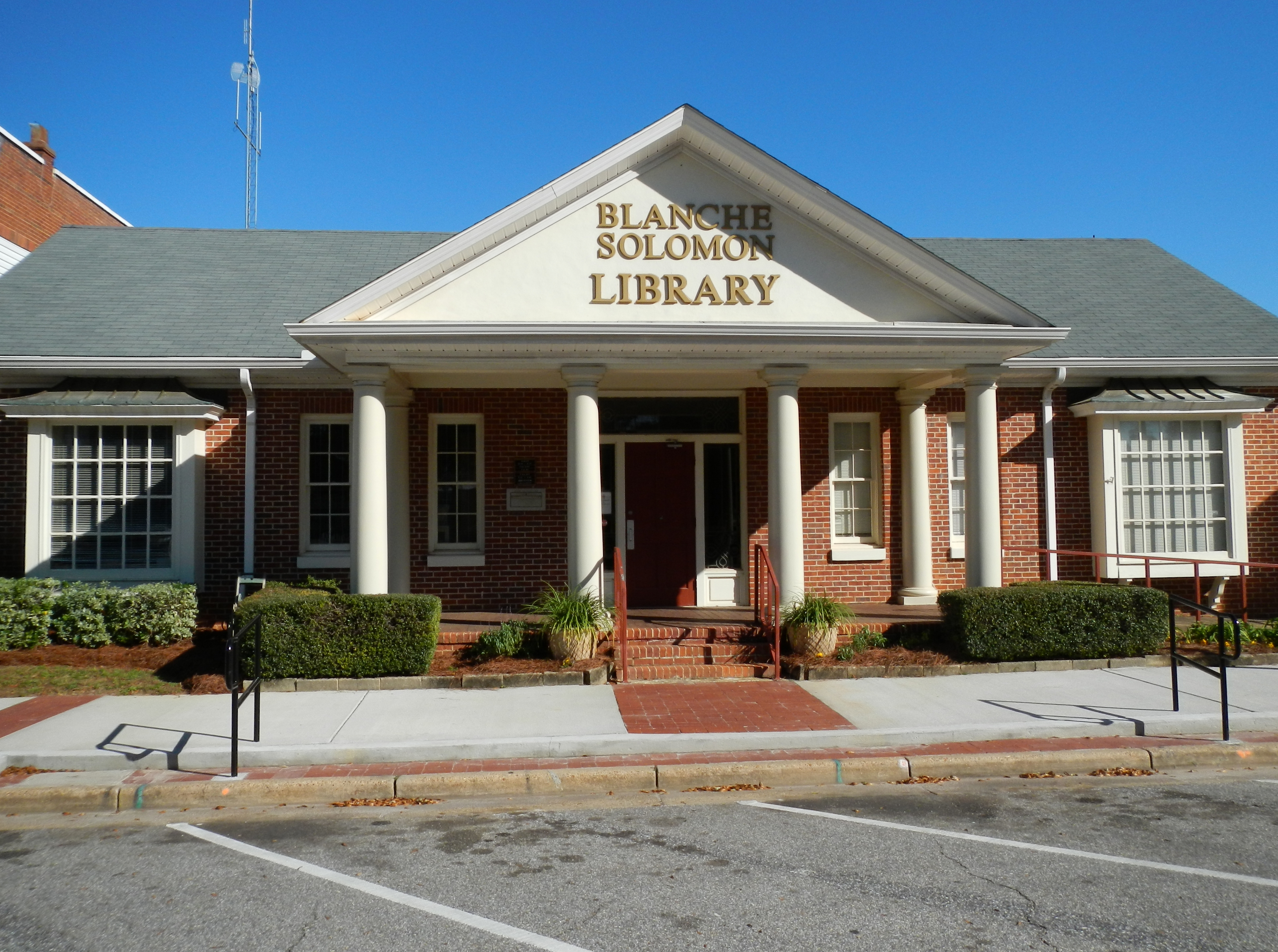
Blanche R. Solomon Memorial Library

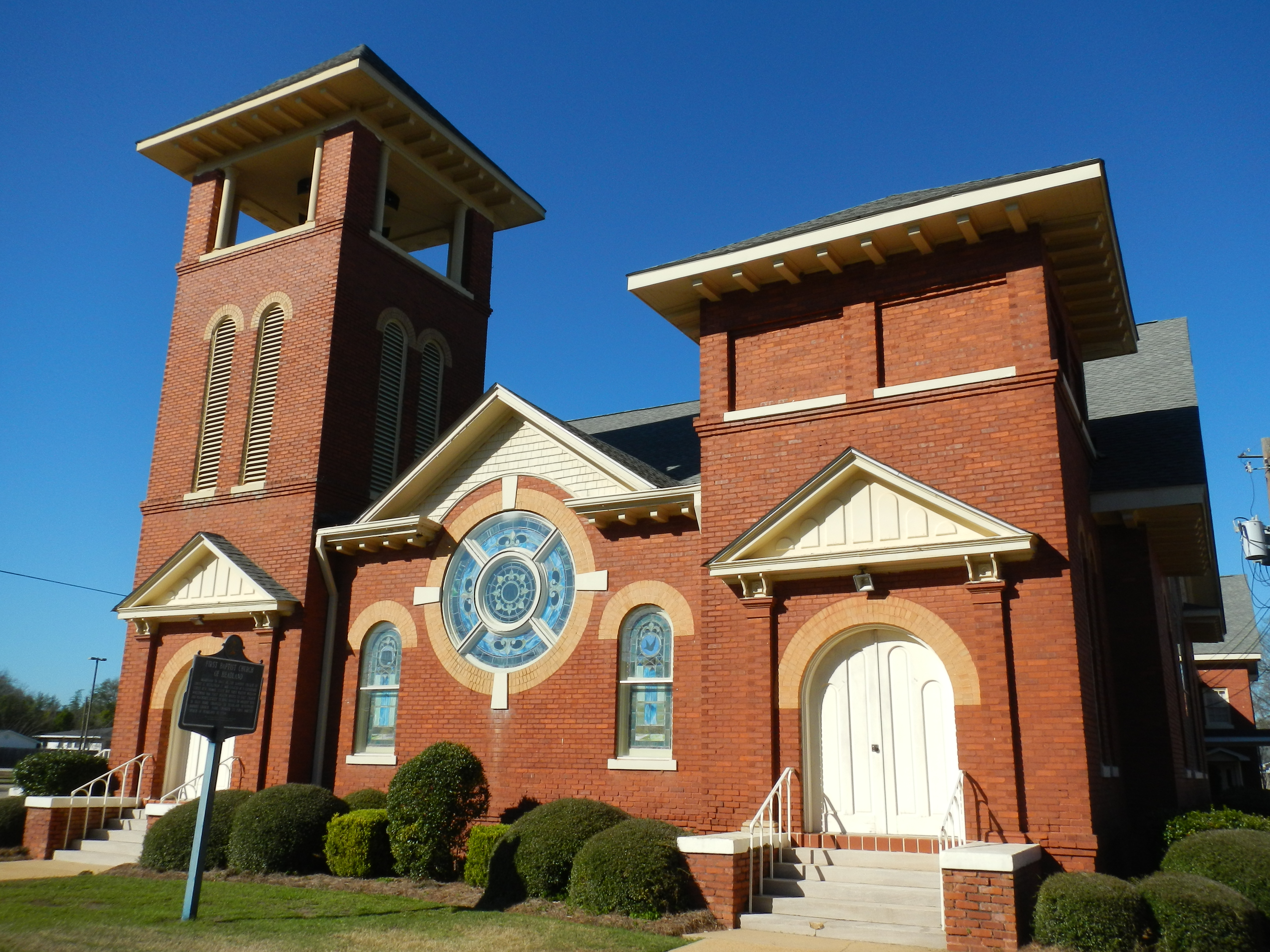
The First Baptist Church of Headland was first organized in 1837.
