= Kennedy Building =

Kennedy Building may refer to:

in the United States (by state then city)

- Kennedy Building (West Yellowstone, Montana), listed on the NRHP in Gallatin County
- Kennedy Building (Omaha, Nebraska), listed on the NRHP in Douglas County
- Kennedy-Worthington Blocks, Springfield, Massachusetts, listed on the NRHP in Hampden County
- Kennedy-Warren Apartment Building, Washington, D.C., listed on the NRHP in Northwest Quadrant
- Robert F. Kennedy Department of Justice Building, Washington, D.C.

== See also ==
- Kennedy House (disambiguation)
