= Thomas B. Walker Jr. =

Thomas Bidwell Walker Jr.
- Born: December 23, 1923; Nashville, Tennessee, U.S.
- Died: October 11, 2016 (aged 92); Dallas, Texas, U.S.
- Education: West End High School
- Alma mater: Vanderbilt University
- Occupations: Investment banker, corporate director, philanthropist
- Employer: Goldman Sachs
- Known for: Founder of the Goldman Sachs office in Dallas
- Spouse: Anne Marie Newton
- Children: 2 sons

Thomas Bidwell Walker Jr., also known as Tommy Walker (December 23, 1923 – October 11, 2016), was an American investment banker, corporate director and philanthropist. A veteran of World War II, he started his career in investment banking in Tennessee and soon moved to Dallas, Texas. He became the main driving force behind the Dallas office of Goldman Sachs, where he "not only established Goldman Sachs' presence in the Southwest" but also "led the initial public offerings for many of the most important companies in Texas."

== Early life ==
Thomas B. Walker Jr. was born on December 23, 1923, in Nashville, Tennessee.

Walker was educated at the West End High School. He enrolled at Vanderbilt University, but he joined the United States Navy during World War II and served aboard the USS Ahrens. He was decommissioned in 1946, and he graduated from Vanderbilt University in 1947.

== Career ==
Walker began his career at the Equitable Securities Corporation in 1948, first in Nashville and shortly after in Memphis. By 1950, he was transferred to the Dallas Office, where he worked until 1968. The corporation merged with American Express in 1968, and later still with SunTrust Banks.

Walker launched the Dallas office of Goldman Sachs in 1968, where he was a general partner until 1984. From 1974 to 1984, he was the only Goldman Sachs partner outside New York City to serve on its management committee. He was promoted to limited partner in 1984, and served in this capacity until 1999, when he retired as senior director.

Walker was a member of the New York Stock Exchange, the National Association of Securities Dealers and the Investment Bankers Association of America, and former president of the Dallas Securities Dealers Association. He served on the board of directors of A. H. Belo from 1982 to 1997. He also served on the board of American Medical International (later known as American Medical Holdings), the NCH Corporation, Intermedics, Sysco, Central and South West Corp. (which later merged with American Electric Power), and Riviana Foods (which later merged with Ebro Foods). Additionally, he served on the board of the Saudi Economic and Development Company.

== Political activity and philanthropy ==
Walker donated at least $100,000 to the Republican Party in 1989.

In 1999, Walker donated US$2 million to the Southwestern Medical Foundation to support macular degeneration and breast cancer research at the University of Texas Southwestern Medical Center in Dallas. With his wife, he also donated to the Hutchinson School in Memphis.

Walker served on the board of trust of his alma mater, Vanderbilt University, from 1974 to 2003, some of which as chairman. With his wife, he endowed The Anne Marie and Thomas B. Walker Jr. Scholarship at the Vanderbilt University College of Arts and Science and The Anne Marie and Thomas B. Walker Jr. Chair in Finance and Accounting at Vanderbilt's Owen Graduate School of Management. They also endowed Owen's Walker Management Library.

== Personal life and death ==
Walker married Anne Marie Newton in 1950. They had two sons, John Newton Walker and Tom Walker III. They resided in Dallas, Texas. His wife predeceased him in 2010.

Walker died of congestive heart failure on October 11, 2016, in Dallas, Texas. His funeral was held at the Highland Park Presbyterian Church on October 21, 2016.

On his death, Robert W. Decherd, the chairman and CEO of Belo, said Walker "not only established Goldman Sachs' presence in the Southwest, he led the initial public offerings for many of the most important companies in Texas."
