= General West =

General West may refer to:

- Absolom M. West (1818–1894), Confederate States Army brigadier general
- Clement West (1892–1972), British Army major general
- Francis H. West (1825–1896), Union Army brevet brigadier general
- John West, 1st Earl De La Warr (1693–1766), 1st Troop of Horse Guards General of the Horse
- John West, 2nd Earl De La Warr (1729–1777), British Army lieutenant general
- Joseph R. West (1822–1898), Union Army brigadier general and brevet major general
- Michael West (British Army officer) (1905–1978), British Army general
- Nadja West (born 1961), U.S. Army lieutenant general
- W. Thomas West (born 1943), U.S. Air Force major general
- William West (Rhode Island politician) (c. 1733–1816), Continental Army brigadier general in the American Revolutionary War

== See also ==
- Major General West, fictional character in the Stargate SG-1 universe
- Attorney General West (disambiguation)
