= Sharlene Newman =

American cognitive neuroscientist

Sharlene D. Newman
- Born: Abbeville, Alabama
- Education: Vanderbilt University, University of Alabama at Birmingham
- Known for: Neuroimaging, functional magnetic resonance imaging
- Awards: City of Bloomington Woman of the Year Award 2018
- Scientific career
- Fields: Cognitive neuroscience
- Workplaces: University of Alabama, Indiana University, Carnegie Mellon University
- Thesis: AN fMRI of the discrepancies observed in functional neuroimaging studies of phonological perception (1999)

Sharlene D. Newman is an American cognitive neuroscientist, executive director of the Alabama Life Research Institute at the University of Alabama (UA), Professor in the Department of Psychology at UA, and an adjunct professor in the Department of Psychological and Brain Sciences at Indiana University.

Her research specialises in understanding brain function using neuroimaging methods such as magnetic resonance imaging. She was one of the first to apply these neuroimaging techniques to study language processing in the human brain, which helped identify which regions of the brain are involved in different linguistic functions. She has also worked on using neuroimaging to understand other aspects of brain function, such as executive function, mathematical and spatial processing, substance addiction, and psychopathology.

== Early life and education ==
Newman was born in Abbeville, Alabama. She studied electrical engineering at Vanderbilt University, completing her bachelor's degree in 1993. She obtained a master's degree and Ph.D. in biomedical engineering from the University of Alabama at Birmingham in 1996 and 1999, respectively.

== Research and career ==
Newman began her postdoctoral research studying language processing using functional magnetic resonance imaging (fMRI) at Carnegie Mellon University in 1999, where she was also an adjunct professor. Her work was among the first research efforts to study complex language function and processing in the human brain through neuroimaging methods. Her postdoctoral work examined which regions of the brain are involved with different functions in sentence comprehension and other linguistic processes. She also worked on applying machine learning methods to fMRI data to identify different cognitive functions from brain images.

In 2004, Newman joined the Department of Psychological and Brain Sciences at Indiana University, where has been a Professor since 2017. She served as the associate Vice Provost for undergraduate education from 2016 to 2019, and was named the Herman B Wells Endowed Professor in 2018. At Indiana, she continued her research into complex language function, using functional magnetic resonance imaging to understand the brain functions involved in sentence comprehension, bilingual learning, and sign-language learning. Her research also studied mathematical and spatial ability in adults and children.

Newman was a founder of the Imaging Research Facility at Indiana University, and later became its director. Here, her work used neuroimaging techniques to understand how substances such as alcohol and cannabis affect brain function. Her research also looked at other aspects of brain health, such as schizophrenia, epilepsy, and concussions.

Newman became the executive director of the Alabama Life Research Institute at the University of Alabama in 2019, an interdisciplinary research institute focusing on healthcare research.

== Awards and honours ==
Newman was awarded the Woman of the Year Award by the City of Bloomington, Indiana in 2018 for her advocacy work on improving educational opportunities for young Black girls and women.

Newman was inducted as a fellow into the American Association for the Advancement of Science (AAAS) IN 2022.

Newman was elected into the 2025 class of fellows of the American Institute of Medical and Biological Engineering (AIMBE).

== Selected publications ==
Newman has written over 100 publications in the field of cognitive science and neuroimaging, and authored a book chapter entitled Neural Bases of Giftedness in the book Critical Issues and Practices in Gifted Education by Carolyn M. Callahan and Jonathan A. Plucker. Some her publications are listed below:

- Newman, Sharlene D; Carpenter, Patricia A; Varma, Sashank; Just, Marcel Adam (2003-01-01). "Frontal and parietal participation in problem solving in the Tower of London: fMRI and computational modeling of planning and high-level perception". Neuropsychologia. 41 (12): 1668–1682.
- Newman, Sharlene D; Just, Marcel Adam; Keller, Timothy A; Roth, Jennifer; Carpenter, Patricia A (2003-04-01). "Differential effects of syntactic and semantic processing on the subregions of Broca's area". Cognitive Brain Research. 16 (2): 297–307.
- Mitchell, Tom; Hutchinson, Rebecca; Niculescu, Radu S; Pereira, Francisco; Wang, Xuerui; Just, Marcel; Newman, Sharlene (2004). "Learning to Decode Cognitive States from Brain Images". Machine Learning. 57: 145–175 – via Springer.
- Newman, Sharlene D.; Klatzky, Roberta L.; Lederman, Susan J.; Just, Marcel Adam (2005-05-01). "Imagining material versus geometric properties of objects: an fMRI study". Cognitive Brain Research. 23 (2): 235–246.
- Newman, Sharlene D.; Ikuta, Toshikazu; Burns, Thomas (2010-05-01). "The effect of semantic relatedness on syntactic analysis: An fMRI study". Brain and Language. 113 (2): 51–58.
- Cheng, H; Skosnik, PD; Pruce, BJ; Brumbaugh, MS; Vollmer, JM; Fridberg, DJ; O'Donnell, BF; Hetrick, WP; Newman, SD (2014-11-01). "Resting state functional magnetic resonance imaging reveals distinct brain activity in heavy cannabis users – a multi-voxel pattern analysis". Journal of Psychopharmacology. 28 (11): 1030–1040
- Cheng, Hu; Kellar, Derek; Lake, Allison; Finn, Peter; Rebec, George V.; Dharmadhikari, Shalmali; Dydak, Ulrike; Newman, Sharlene (2018-05-01). "Effects of Alcohol Cues on MRS Glutamate Levels in the Anterior Cingulate". Alcohol and Alcoholism. 53 (3): 209–215
