= Oates House =

Historic house in Alabama, United States

- U.S. National Register of Historic Places
- Location within Alabama Location within the United States
- Location: 302 Kirkland St., Abbeville, Alabama
- Coordinates: 31°34′1″N 85°15′2″W
- Area: 0.2 acres (0.081 ha)
- Built: 1900, 1910
- Architectural style: Classical Revival
- NRHP reference No.: 89000164
- Added to NRHP: March 17, 1989

The Oates House (also known as the Shoemaker House) is a historic home in Abbeville, Alabama, United States. The house was listed on the National Register of Historic Places in 1989.

== History ==
Ephraim Oates had come to Henry County, Alabama, in 1839 at the age of 13. He took over the family farm and expanded it to over 5,000 acres (2,000 ha). In 1900, he purchased land in Abbeville from his cousin, Alabama Governor William C. Oates, and built a one-story house. In 1910, he greatly expanded the house, adding a second story and remodeling it in a Neoclassical style. The house was purchased in 1927 by the Shoemaker family, who added floor-to-ceiling casement windows to the front rooms and built a sleeping porch, porte-cochère, and rear kitchen wing.

== Architecture ==
The main façade is dominated by four Tuscan columns supporting a triangular pediment, creating a full-height entry portico. The main entrance has a transom and sidelights, and is flanked by floor-to-ceiling casement windows with a balcony above. End windows on the first floor and the four second floor windows are two-over-two double hung sash windows. The north side of the house features a porte-cochère supported by two Tuscan columns, with a balcony above. A shed-roofed sleeping porch adorns the south side, and on the rear is a one-story kitchen addition and screened porch. The interior features a central hall with rooms on either side on both floors.
