= WESZ-LP =

- Abbeville, Alabama; United States
- Frequency: 98.7 MHz
- Branding: Oldies 98.7

Programming
- Format: Oldies

Ownership
- Owner: Abbeville Broadcasting Inc.

History
- First air date: 2004

Technical information
- Licensing authority: FCC
- Facility ID: 132859
- Class: L1
- ERP: 96 watts
- HAAT: 23.2 meters (76 feet)
- Transmitter coordinates: 31°34′18″N 85°14′08″W

Links
- Public license information: LMS
- Website: https://wesz987.live

WESZ-LP (98.7 FM, "Oldies 98.7") is a radio station licensed to serve Abbeville, Alabama. The station is owned by Abbeville Broadcasting Inc. It airs an Oldies music format.

The station was assigned the WESZ-LP call letters by the Federal Communications Commission on December 27, 2002.
