= Attorney General West =

Attorney General West may refer to:

- Thomas F. West (1874–1931), Attorney General of Florida
- William H. West (judge) (1824–1911), Attorney General of Ohio

== See also ==
- General West (disambiguation)
