= M. Watt Espy =

American researcher on capital punishment (1933-2009)

Major Watt Espy, Jr. (March 2, 1933 – August 13, 2009) was a researcher and expert on capital punishment in the United States.

Espy, a resident of Headland, Alabama, attended the University of Alabama where he was a member of the Phi Sigma Kappa fraternity. Even in college he had garnered a reputation as an engaging speaker, serving as toastmaster for the 30th anniversary banquet of the chapter, held in 1955. He graduated in 1957.

Espy was an author, with John Ortiz Smykla, of The Espy Files, a database of executions carried out in the United States and preceding territories from 1608, which is the most complete source of data on the issue, identifying 15,487 people put to death.

He began his research in the 1970s when he was a salesman, working with everything from cemetery plots to security systems. While making calls he would stop at a prison or courthouse for information. He became a full-time researcher in 1977.

Espy became a death penalty opponent due to his concerns about racial bias, innocence and lack of deterrence. Espy served as a citizen witness to exactly one execution - that of John Louis Evans in the Alabama electric chair on April 22, 1983.

Espy died aged 76 on August 13, 2009.
