= Jimmy Rane =

American businessman

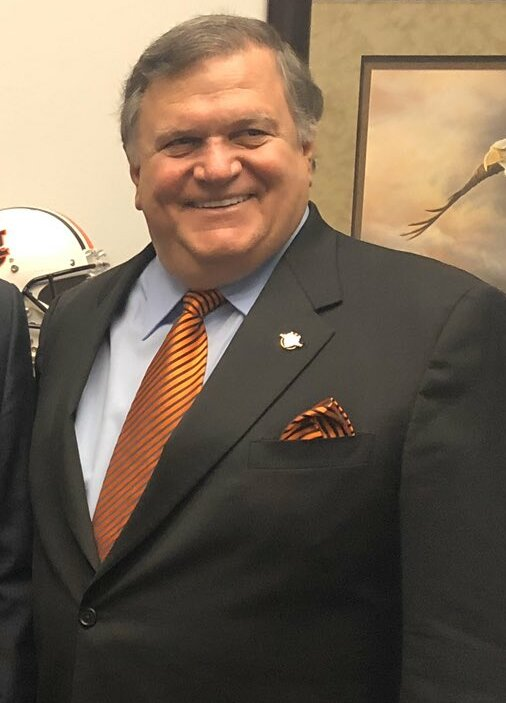
- Rane in 2020
- Born: James W. Rane; 1947 (age 78–79); Abbeville, Alabama, U.S.
- Education: Marion Military Institute (attended); Auburn University (BS); Samford University (JD)
- Title: Founder and former CEO of Great Southern Wood Preserving
- Children: 5

James W. Rane (born 1947) is an American businessman, and the Founder, Chairman and former chief executive officer (CEO) of Great Southern Wood Preserving, one of the largest pressure treated lumber producers in the world. He has frequently appeared in advertisements for the company portraying a fictional cowboy named "the Yella Fella" after the company's flagship product of YellaWood. With an estimated net worth of $1.2 billion, Rane is the wealthiest person in Alabama.

== Early life ==
Rane grew up in the small town of Abbeville, Alabama. His father was the son of Italian immigrants and a World War II veteran who operated several restaurants and hotels, eventually becoming the president of the local chamber of commerce. His mother’s family has lived in Abbeville for over 200 years. Rane attended Marion Military Institute before graduating from Auburn University with a bachelor's degree in business administration, becoming the first member of his family to graduate college. While studying at Auburn, Rane was a member of Theta Xi fraternity Rane would pursue a legal career, attending Cumberland School of Law at Samford University where he earned his Juris Doctor in 1971. In May 2026, Rane received the honorary Doctor of Commerce degree from Samford.

== Career ==
While in law school Rane began working at law firm in Birmingham, Alabama. In 1970, his wife's parents were killed in an automobile accident, leaving behind a small non-operational lumber treatment plant on the brink of bankruptcy. Unable to sell the plant, Rane returned to his hometown to manage it. Rane began operating the plant in 1970, founding Great Southern Wood Preserving with his brother that same year and made his first delivery in 1971 out of the back of a pick up truck. During this time he began his own solo law firm while still operating Great Southern Wood. Rane's workload increased in 1973 when he became a Henry County judge, bringing his number of occupations to three. In 1976, company sales has reached $1.4 million and the company opened a second plant in Mobile, Alabama. Rane quit his job as a judge the following year in order to focus on the company and his law practice.

In 1984 Rane enrolled in Harvard Business School's owner/president management program. While in the program two case studies resulted in Rane to having "an epiphany" on how grow his company to greater heights. The first case study of a large lumber company illustrated Great Southern Wood's need for additional capital and the second case study of Perdue Farms illustrated the need to successfully brand and market a highly commodified product. Rane would obtain $1 million in capital to expand his operations and by 1986 the company had grown to the point in which he was able to quit his second job as a lawyer. In the 1980s he began to market his products through college football, the most popular sport in the Southern United States, by sponsoring athletic departments, radio and TV programs related to the sport and hiring coaches as spokesmen. By the end of the 1990s over 20 different college football coaches had served spokesmen for the company including Bobby Bowden, Tommy Tuberville, Gene Stallings and Pat Dye, with the latter two joining the company’s board of directors upon their retirements. By the turn of the century, the company had grown to one of the largest in the industry.

=== YellaWood ===
In 2004 Great Southern Wood branded its products as YellaWood. In order to promote the brand Rane began appearing in serialized commercials as a cowboy nicknamed "the Yella Fella". The comedic commercials were extremely popular, with "the Yella Fella" being awarded the Bronze Wrangler Award by the National Cowboy & Western Heritage Museum. The commercials ran until 2012. Since 2020, Great Southern Wood has sponsored the YellaWood 500 NASCAR race at Talladega Superspeedway.

In the 21st century Great Southern Wood Preservation has grown into the world's largest pressure treated lumber producer with operations in over 25 countries. In 2016 Forbes named Rane the richest person in the state of Alabama, a title he has maintained every year since. He has an estimated net worth of 1.2 billion dollars.

Despite the growth of Great Southern Wood Preserving into the largest pressure-treated lumber producer in the world, Rane has elected to keep the company’s headquarters in his hometown of Abbeville, a geographically isolated town of just 2,000 people, rather than moving to a larger market. The company has revitalized the town’s previously struggling economy and downtown area, with Rane purchasing and restoring several historical buildings with the goal of preserving the town’s character.

In September 2025, Rane stepped down as CEO of Great Southern Wood Preserving. Rane still serves as board chairman.

== Personal life ==
Rane resides in his home town of Abbeville. Rane has been a member of the board of trustees at his alma mater of Auburn University since 1999. He is a significant donor to the university, donating $12.5 million to a new culinary science center for the school in 2017. Rane is also a prominent athletic booster for Auburn. He is the founder of the Jimmy Rane Foundation which has awarded over 600 scholarships since its establishment in 2000.
