= Abbeville Herald =

- Type: Weekly Newspaper
- Format: Broadsheet
- Publisher: J Edward Dodd III
- Editor: J Edward Dodd III
- Founded: 1915
- Headquarters: P.O. Box 609 Abbeville, Alabama 36310 United States
- Circulation: 2,297
- OCLC number: 12599832
- Website: https://www.facebook.com/abbeville.herald

The Abbeville Herald is a weekly paper published on Thursdays in Abbeville, Alabama. Its weekly circulation is 2,297 copies.

The Abbeville Herald is a weekly newspaper in Abbeville, Alabama, USA covering local news, sports, business and community events.

== History ==
Established in 1915 under the name Southeast Alabamian, the paper was renamed the Abbeville Herald in 1918 when H.H. Golson became its publisher. Within a few years of publishing the paper, Golson entered into a public quarrel with the publisher of the Wiregrass Farmer over charges that Golson was profiteering. Golson also made news in 1925 when he decided to discontinue the practice of offering free advertising to public events that charged admission for entry.

The paper was acquired by H.C. Rodgers in 1927 but he died suddenly of pneumonia in 1929. During Rogers’ short tenure at the paper, the Abbeville Herald was roundly criticized for its ties with the Klan.

C.S. Keller, a former school principal and county agent, purchased the paper in 1935. In May 1941, C.S. Keller sold the paper back to H.H. Golson, who had previously owned the paper.

Jesse Edward Dodd Jr. was the co-publisher of the Abbeville Herald from 1946 to 1977, when he died at the age of 50.

Dodd's son, Edward (Eddie) Dodd III took over the paper after his father's death. In 1985, Eddie Dodd was cited in newspapers around the country when he commented for an Associated Press report that the Soviet embassy paid New York-based North American Precis Syndicate Inc. to distribute Soviet-friendly press releases. The firm sent hundreds of stories to several thousand local media entities, focusing on weekly papers like the Abbeville Herald. “It’s a nice package--very slick,” Dodd said in the AP report, though he also reported that he typically throws away the packages he receives.

In 1983, the Abbeville Herald received national attention for publishing a letter criticizing Circuit Judge Billy Joe Sheffield. The letter, written by Connie Cox, criticized the judge for his handling of her divorce case and wrote the letter to warn others in the county about the judge. Judge Sheffield initially responded by holding the Cox in contempt of court and charged her with a $100 fine. The judge withdrew his order when the Abbeville Herald printed a sampling of letters they received from around the country, all criticizing the judge's actions. The judge was later suspended for two months without pay by an ethics panel for his contempt of court ruling. Judge Sheffield filed a 1.5 million dollar libel lawsuit against The Dothan Eagle and the Abbeville Herald. Judge Sheffield eventually withdrew his libel suits.

Eddie Dodd, the paper's current editor/publisher, currently serves on the Alabama Press Association's Board.
