= Donald W. Southgate =

American architect

Donald Wright Southgate
- Born: 1887; Nashville, Tennessee, U.S.
- Died: February 8, 1953 (aged 65–66); Nashville, Tennessee, U.S.
- Resting place: Mount Olivet Cemetery
- Education: Massachusetts Institute of Technology
- Occupation: Architect
- Spouse: Lizinka Elliston Farrell
- Children: 4 daughters

Donald W. Southgate (1887–1953) was an American architect. He designed many buildings in Davidson County, Tennessee, especially Nashville and Belle Meade, some of which are listed on the National Register of Historic Places.

== Early life ==
Donald W. Southgate was born in 1887 in Nashville, Tennessee. He attended the Massachusetts Institute of Technology, where he studied architecture.

== Career ==
Southgate began his career as an architect in Boston, Pittsburgh and New York City.

Southgate moved to Nashville in 1914, where he opened his own practice until 1918. In 1917, he designed the Jacksonian Apartments, an apartment building on West End Avenue; it was demolished in 1999.

Southgate designed the Thigpen Building at 3608 West End Avenue in 1918 for John J. Bevington, a world War I veteran and the vice president of Cain-Sloan. From 1947 to 1955, Bevington rented it to former Tennessee Governor Hill McAlister. It was home to the Free Will Baptist Bible College from 1975 to 2008, when they moved their campus to Gallatin. The house was renamed after the college's third president in 1991.

Southgate worked as an architect for DuPont in the company town of Old Hickory, Tennessee, in 1918–1919. He subsequently resumed his private practice. He designed several houses in Belle Meade near Nashville in the 1920s, including a house on Deer Park Circle for Belle Meade's mayor Joseph Gibbon Jr. in 1927, the Julian Scruggs house on Sheppard Place, the J.B. Shwab House at 420 Jackson Boulevard, and the M.J. Cain House at 115 Jackson Boulevard. In 1932, he helped Bryant Fleming design Cheekwood in 1932. He designed the Thomas P. Kennedy Jr. House in Forest Hills, Tennessee, in 1937; it is listed on the National Register of Historic Places.

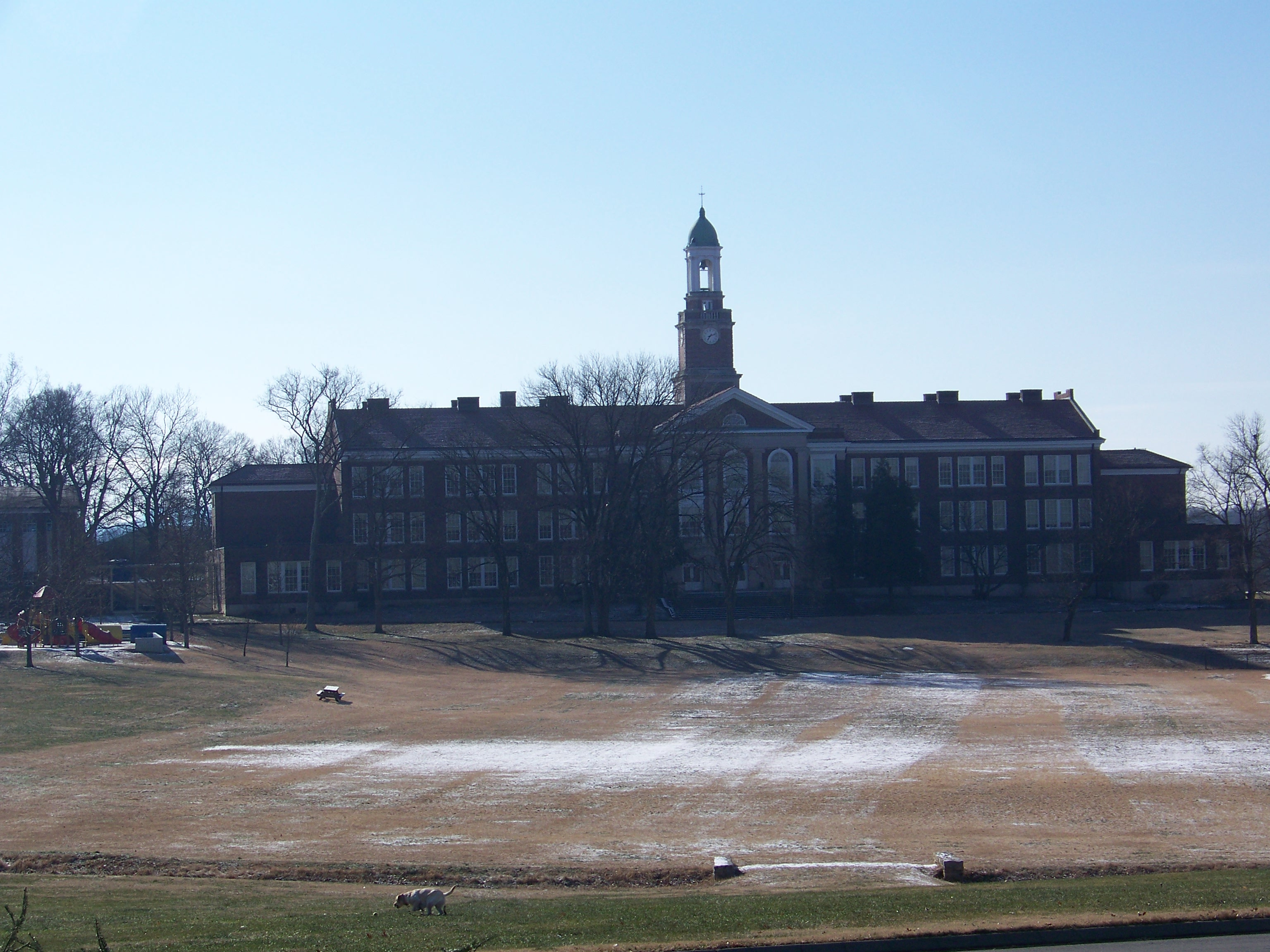
The West End High School, designed by Southgate.

Southgate designed at least two schools: the Madison High School, and the West End High School (now West End Middle School) in the Colonial Revival architectural style in 1937, which is listed on the National Register of Historic Places.

Southgate designed several churches and religious buildings. For the United Methodist Church, he designed the Methodist Board of Education Building, as well as the West End United Methodist Church in the Gothic Revival architectural style. For the Churches of Christ, he designed the West End Church of Christ in the Colonial Revival style. For the Episcopal Church in 1947–1948, he designed St. George's Episcopal Church at 4715 Harding Road in Belle Meade in the Greek Revival architectural style. Southgate also designed the Inglewood Baptist Church.

Southgate designed commercial buildings, banks and other facilities. He designed the Joseph B. Knowles Memorial Home for Aged Colored Persons, built by the Public Works Administration in 1935. He also designed the bandstand in East Park, East Nashville, but it was removed in 1956.

Southgate was a founding member of the Nashville chapter of the American Institute of Architects in 1922, and the founding members of its Tennessee chapter.

== Personal life, death and legacy ==
Southgate married Lizinka Elliston Farrell, a descendant of Mayor Joseph Thorpe Elliston and TN Rep. William R. Elliston, slaveholding owners of the Burlington plantation. The couple had four daughters.

Southgate died of influenza on February 8, 1953, in Nashville. His funeral was held at St. George's Episcopal Church, and he was buried in Mount Olivet Cemetery. The Southgate Condominiums, an apartment building on West End Avenue, was named in his honor.
