= Kennedy House (Abbeville, Alabama) =

Historic house in Alabama, United States

- U.S. National Register of Historic Places
- Alabama Register of Landmarks and Heritage
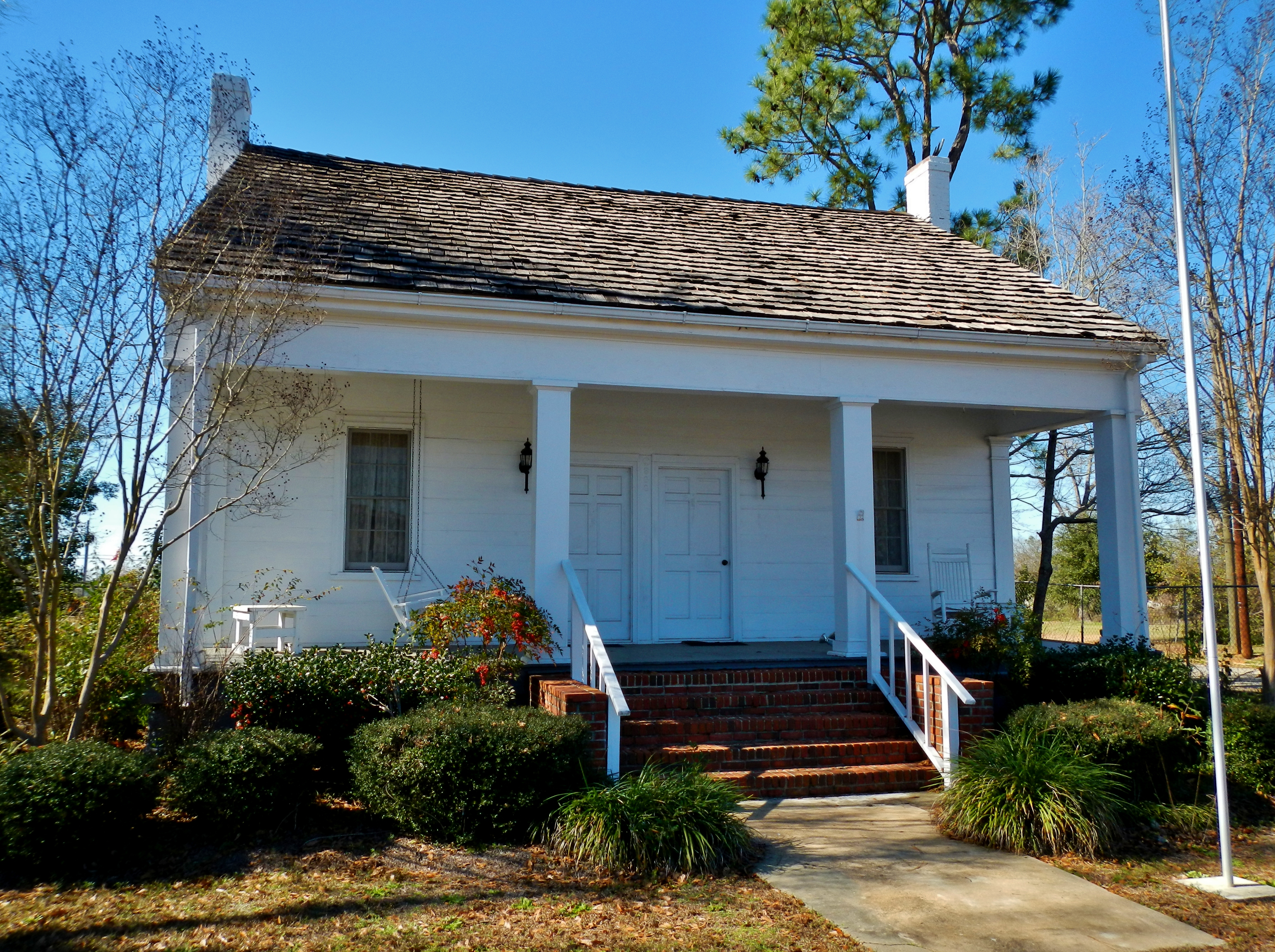
- The house in January 2012

- Location within Alabama Location within the United States
- Location: 300 Kirkland St., Abbeville, Alabama
- Coordinates: 31°34′2″N 85°15′3″W
- Area: less than one acre
- Built: 1870
- Architectural style: Late Creole Cottage Style
- NRHP reference No.: 78000489

Significant dates
- Added to NRHP: January 5, 1978
- Designated ARLH: July 19, 1976

The Kennedy House (also known as the Bethune-Kennedy House) is a historic residence in Abbeville, Alabama, United States. The house was listed on the Alabama Register of Landmarks and Heritage in 1976 and the National Register of Historic Places in 1978.

== History ==
The house was built around 1870 by William Calvin Bethune, a local physician. The house changed hands several times before being acquired by William and Mollie Kennedy in 1885. The Kennedys, who were Henry County farmers, used it as a town house. It remained in the family until 1974, when it was purchased by the local Board of Education. The house was later owned by the Abbeville Chamber of Commerce.

== Architecture ==
The house was built in Creole cottage style, common along the Gulf coast, but more rare inland. The side gable roof has exterior chimneys in each end, and also covers a full-width front porch. A tall frieze is supported by four Doric columns, with matching pilasters on the corners of the house. Twin six-panel entry doors open into separate rooms, each of which contains an original fireplace mantel. The northern room has an enclosed stair hall leading to the finished attic space. The rear originally had a porch and breezeway connected to a kitchen, however this was removed in the early 1900s and replaced with an addition containing bedrooms. This addition was removed in the 1970s by the Board of Education.
