= W. Thomas West =

United States Air Force general

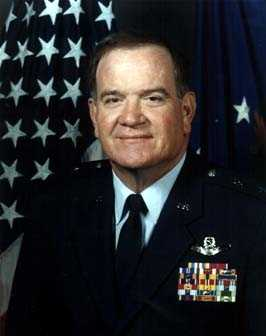
- Major General West
- Nickname: Tiny
- Born: May 14, 1943 (age 82); Headland, Alabama
- Allegiance: United States of America
- Branch: United States Air Force
- Service years: 1966-1997
- Rank: Major General
- Commands: The 19th Air Force, Air Education and Training Command
- Conflicts: Vietnam War; Gulf War
- Awards: Defense Superior Service Medal; Legion of Merit; Meritorious Service Medal; Vietnam Service Medal

Walter Thomas West (born May 14, 1943) was a Major General in the U.S. Air Force. His last post was to serve as the Commander of the 19th Air Force, Air Education and Training Command at Randolph Air Force Base in Texas. Prior to that position, he served Deputy Director for operations for the U.S. Pacific Command, and as Commander of the 57th Fighter Weapons Wing at Nellis Air Force Base in Nevada.

During his career, West completed over 3500 flight hours (of which 343 were combat hours) piloting aircraft such as the A-7 and the F-100. Additionally, he served as a commander of both F-4 and F-16 units. West's awards include the Distinguished Flying Cross, the Presidential Unit Citation, and the Defense Superior Service Medal.

== Education ==
- Bachelor's degree in Business Administration from Florida State University in 1965.
- Master's degree in Psychology from Troy State University in 1976.
