= Thomas P. Kennedy Jr. House =

Historic house in Tennessee, United States

- U.S. National Register of Historic Places
- Location within Tennessee
- Location: 6231 Hillsboro Pike, Forest Hills, Tennessee
- Area: 25.7 acres (10.4 ha)
- Built: 1937
- Architect: Donald W. Southgate
- Architectural style: Colonial Revival
- MPS: Forest Hills, Tennessee MPS
- NRHP reference No.: 03001079
- Added to NRHP: October 27, 2003

The Thomas P. Kennedy Jr. House is a historic mansion in Forest Hills, Tennessee, U.S.. It was built in 1937 for Thomas P. Kennedy Jr., the president of O'Bryan Brothers Inc. It was designed by Donald W. Southgate in the Colonial Revival architectural style. It has been listed on the National Register of Historic Places since October 27, 2003.
