= Headland station =

- Seaboard Coast Line Railroad Depot
- U.S. National Register of Historic Places
- Location within Alabama Location within the United States
- Location: Broad St., Headland, Alabama
- Coordinates: 31°21′13″N 85°20′33″W
- Area: 2.1 acres (0.85 ha)
- Built: 1893
- Built by: Abbeville Southern Railway
- NRHP reference No.: 80000687
- Added to NRHP: September 4, 1980

External image
- Photo of the depot from 1980

The Seaboard Coast Line Railroad Depot was a train station in Headland, Alabama, United States. The depot was constructed in 1893 by the Abbeville Southern Railway, which built a line to connect Abbeville with the Alabama Midland Railway at Grimes. The Alabama Midland and Abbeville Southern became part of the Plant System in 1894, which was taken over by the Atlantic Coast Line Railroad in 1901 and merged into the Seaboard Coast Line Railroad in 1967. Regular passenger service through Headland ended in 1929, although mixed service on freight trains continued into the mid-1950s. Freight service was discontinued in 1979. Despite efforts to renovate and repurpose the building, it was demolished after 1980.

The depot was built of local pine and oak, and covered with a gable roof with deep, bracketed eaves. The western third of the building was divided into two passenger waiting rooms and the agent's office, while the eastern two-thirds was a large freight storage area. A loading platform ran the length of the building along the tracks.

The station was listed on the National Register of Historic Places in 1980.

Preceding station	Atlantic Coast Line Railroad	Following station
Grimes toward Dothan	Dothan – Abbeville	Newville toward Abbeville
