= Kennedy-Worthington Blocks =

- U.S. National Register of Historic Places
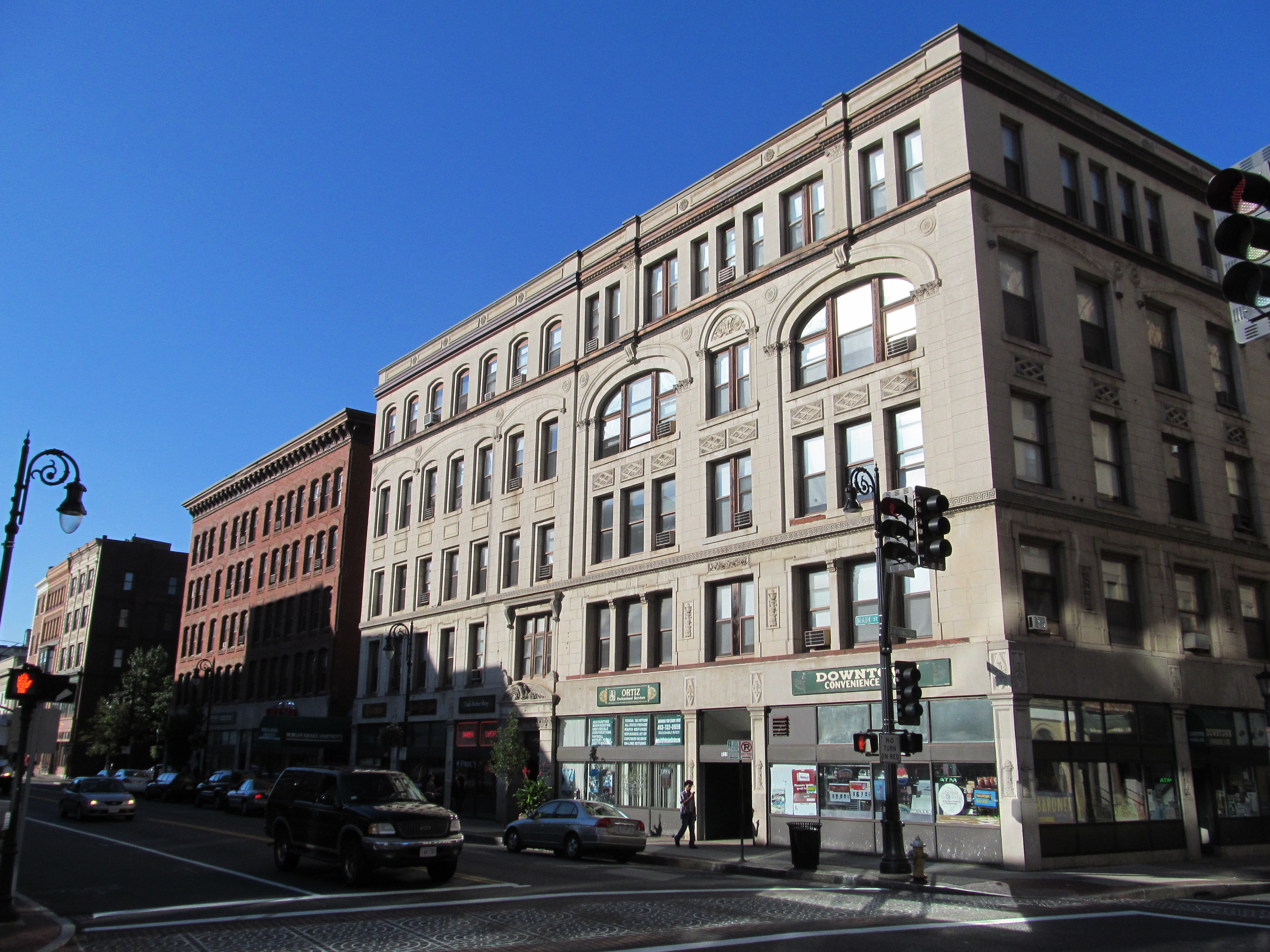
- Kennedy-Worthington Blocks

- Location within Massachusetts Location within the United States
- Location: 1585-1623 Main St. and 166-190 Worthington St., Springfield, Massachusetts
- Coordinates: 42°6′15″N 72°35′36″W
- Area: less than one acre
- Built: 1872
- Architect: Frederick S. Newman; E. C. & G. C. Gardner
- NRHP reference No.: 79000347
- Added to NRHP: June 14, 1979

The Kennedy-Worthington Blocks are three historic commercial and industrial buildings at 1585-1623 Main Street and 166-190 Worthington Street in downtown Springfield, Massachusetts. Built in the 1870s and 1880s, with a major restyling to two of them in 1912, the buildings were a major factor in the urban development of the area north of the city's traditional core. They were listed to the National Register of Historic Places in 1979.

== Description and history ==
The Kennedy and Worthington Blocks occupy the length of one city block of Main Street in downtown Springfield, between Taylor and Worthington Streets. The buildings are built out of brick; the Worthington Block was built in two stages, and had a unifying facade of stone designed for it in 1914. It is separated from the Kennedy Block by a narrow alley, in which pedestrian bridges connect them at various points on the upper floors. Both are five stories in height, and have somewhat elaborate facades. The Kennedy Block is fourteen bays wide, with windows on the upper floors set in segmented-arch openings with red sandstone sills and lintels. An elaborate bracketed and dentillated cornice projects at the top of the facades facing both Main and Taylor Streets. The Worthington Block's Main Street facade is also fourteen bays wide, with differing treatments on each level. The most elaborate level is the fourth, where the windows are grouped under carved arches with medallions at the ends, and carved panels below the windows. Its main entrance is set near the center, surrounded by block pilasters topped by an elaborate entablature.

The Kennedy Block was built in 1874, in part using the remains of an 1860 building heavily damaged by fire. It was built by Emerson Wight, a prominent local businessman who served four terms as mayor. It was the first building of four stories to be built in this area; it was damaged by fire, and rebuilt as a five-story in 1875. The Worthington Block was built in 1872 to a design by George Potter, and was extensively damaged by a fire in the building in 1888, and another in an adjacent building in 1893. Its 1914 stone facade is the work of E. C. & G. C. Gardner, local architects. The buildings have had a number of tenants important in Springfield's economic and civic life, including the offices of the Springfield Daily News, the Daily Union, and manufacturers such as Morgan Envelope and R.H. Smith.

== See also ==
- National Register of Historic Places listings in Springfield, Massachusetts
- National Register of Historic Places listings in Hampden County, Massachusetts
