= West End High School (Nashville, Tennessee) =

- U.S. National Register of Historic Places
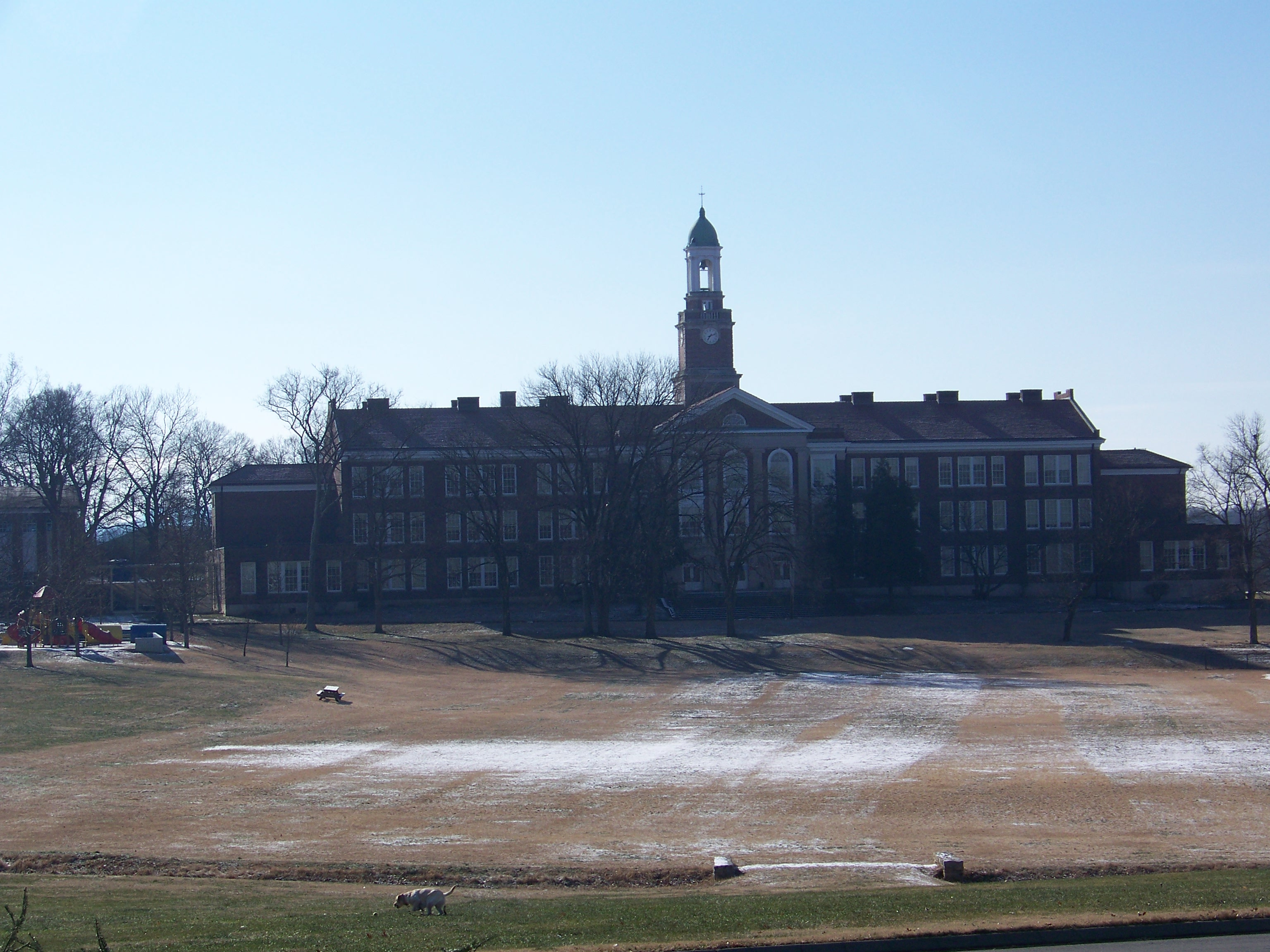
- West End High School in 2009

- Location within Tennessee Location within the United States
- Location: 3529 West End Avenue, Nashville, Tennessee, U.S.
- Coordinates: 36.131667°N 86.823889°W
- Area: 12.7 acres (5.1 ha)
- Built: 1937; 89 years ago
- Architect: Donald W. Southgate
- Architectural style: Colonial Revival
- NRHP reference No.: 03000726
- Added to NRHP: August 1, 2003

West End High School is a historic building in Nashville, Tennessee, US. It is currently in use as West End Middle School.

== History ==
The building was completed in 1937. It was built as a project of the Public Works Administration. The building's name was changed to West End Middle School in 1971. In 2015, it hosted grades 5-8.

== Architectural significance ==
The building was designed by architect Donald W. Southgate in the Colonial Revival architectural style. It has been listed on the National Register of Historic Places since August 1, 2003.

== Notable students ==
- William P. Lawrence (1947), United States Navy vice admiral and Naval Aviator; a prisoner of war in Vietnam
