= Thomas Kennedy House (Paris, Kentucky) =

Residential structure

- U.S. National Register of Historic Places
- Location within Kentucky Location within the United States
- Nearest city: Paris, Kentucky
- Coordinates: 38°10′06″N 84°13′49″W
- Area: 5 acres (2.0 ha)
- Built: 1785
- Built by: Thomas Kennedy
- NRHP reference No.: 80001484
- Added to NRHP: December 8, 1980

The Thomas Kennedy House, in Bourbon County, Kentucky near Paris, Kentucky, was built in 1785. It was listed on the National Register of Historic Places in 1980.

It was built by Thomas Kennedy (1744–1827), one of Bourbon County's earliest settlers.

The listing included one contributing building and one contributing site on 5 acres (2.0 ha).

It is located southeast of Paris on Paris-Winchester Rd.
