= Abbeville, Alabama =

City in and county seat of Henry County, Alabama

- City
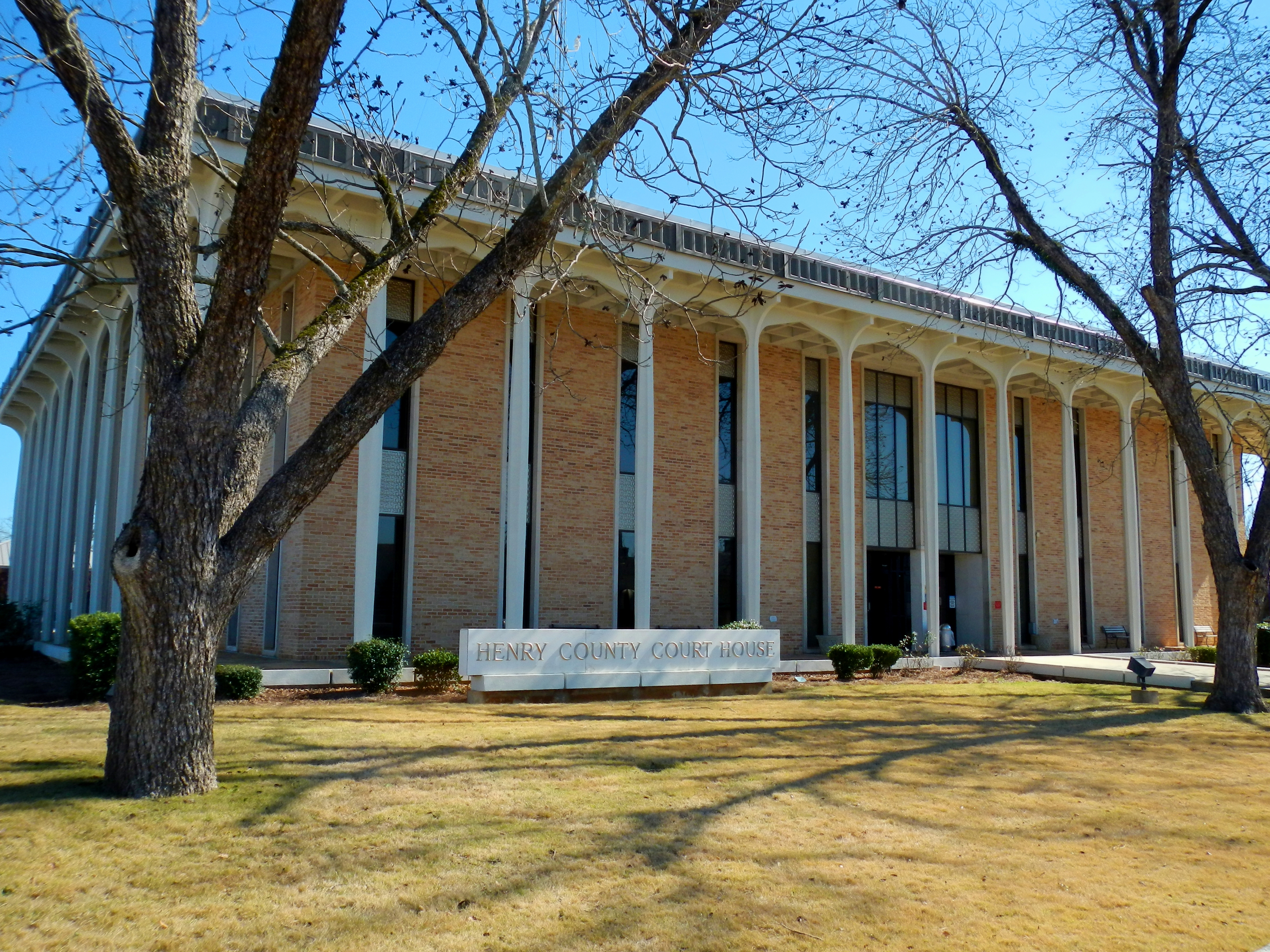
- Henry County Courthouse is located in Abbeville (2012)

- Flag Seal

- Location of Abbeville in Henry County, Alabama.
- Coordinates: 31°33′55″N 85°14′45″W
- Country: United States
- State: Alabama
- County: Henry

Government
  - Mayor: Jimmy Money

Area
  - Total: 15.58 sq mi (40.36 km^{2})
  - Land: 15.54 sq mi (40.26 km^{2})
  - Water: 0.042 sq mi (0.11 km^{2}) 0.32%
- Elevation: 427 ft (130 m)

Population (2020)
  - Total: 2,358
  - Density: 151.7/sq mi (58.58/km^{2})
- Time zone: UTC-6 (CST)
  - Summer (DST): UTC-5 (CDT)
- ZIP code: 36310
- Area code: 334
- FIPS code: 01-00124
- GNIS feature ID: 2403054
- Website: www.cityofabbeville.org

Abbeville /ˈæbɪvɪl/ is a city in and the county seat of Henry County, in the southeast part of Alabama, United States. It is part of the Dothan, Alabama Metropolitan Statistical Area. At the 2020 census, the population was 2,358.

== History ==
European Americans set up an active trading post in Abbeville in Alabama Territory early in 1819. The first settler gateway to the wiregrass region was at Franklin, located fourteen miles west of Abbeville.

Named for the nearby Abbie Creek. Locals say the name of Abbie Creek derives from the Muscogee name for Abbie Creek, Yatta Abba, meaning "dogwood tree grove".

Abbeville was designated as the Henry County seat in 1833; the seat had previously been Columbia. Abbeville acquired its Post Office in 1833. It was formally incorporated in 1853.

=== 20th century to present ===
Abbeville suffered a catastrophic tragedy that wiped out most of the town when an arsonist almost burned the whole town to the ground on May 20, 1906. An entire block of Kirkland Street, the major portion of the business district, was destroyed. The nearby courthouse was almost lost but was saved through the efforts of the "bucket brigade" firefighters, who kept pouring water on the flat roof. During the week of June 28, 1906, a mechanic named Ward was arrested and charged with arson and starting the fire. His bond was set at $500. After his bail was paid, Ward fled Abbeville and the county and was never heard from again. Brick buildings were erected to replace the wooden structures that had been lost in the fire.

In February 1937, Wes Johnson, an 18-year-old African-American man, was accused of attacking a white woman and was arrested. He was abducted from the Henry County jail by a mob of 100 white men and lynched: shot and hanged to death. His body was found "bullet marked" and "swinging from a tree." As was typical of lynchings, none of the members of the mob was charged with a crime. It has been suggested by local historians that Johnson and the white woman were engaged in a consensual sexual relationship, and the accusation of assault was merely a manufactured pretext for the lynching. Howell (who is Howell?) was featured on 60 Minutes on April 8, 2018, during an episode featuring Oprah Winfrey touring the new National Memorial for Peace and Justice in Montgomery, Alabama. Johnson is among the lynching victims memorialized there. Henry County is noted as among the 805 counties where lynchings took place. It had a total of 13 lynchings during the decades when this was frequent. In 1937 the Alabama Attorney General filed an impeachment against the Henry County sheriff for his failure to protect Johnson. An appeal was heard by the Alabama Supreme Court, which overturned the impeachment in June 1937. The Alabama Attorney General openly declared that Johnson was innocent of the charges against him.

In 1944, Recy Taylor, an African-American woman, was gang-raped by seven white men. Although the men admitted the rape to authorities, two grand juries subsequently declined to indict them. From a historic point of view, "the Recy Taylor case brought the building blocks of the Montgomery bus boycott together a decade earlier" than that event.

On November 5, 2002, Kirkland Street was hit by an F2 tornado. The tornado destroyed several single-family homes, mobile homes and many other homes and businesses. The damage at the Abbeville High School was deemed too costly to repair and was rebuilt in a new location. Downed power lines and uprooted trees were numerous and widespread. The Old Pioneer Cemetery was especially hard-hit.

== Geography ==
The city is located in southeastern Alabama along U.S. Route 431, Alabama State Route 10, and Alabama State Route 27. U.S. 431 runs from north to south along the western side of the city as a four-lane divided highway, leading north 27 mi (43 km) to Eufaula and southwest 27 mi (43 km) to Dothan. AL-10 runs from west to east through the center of town as Washington Street, and leads east 13 mi (21 km) to the Georgia state line near Fort Gaines and northwest 17 mi (27 km) to Blue Springs. AL-27 leads southwest from the city 31 mi (50 km) to Ozark.

According to the U.S. Census Bureau, the city has a total area of 15.6 square miles (40 km^{2}), of which 15.6 square miles (40 km^{2}) is land and 0.1 square miles (0.26 km^{2}) (0.32%) is water.

=== Climate ===
The climate in this area is characterized by hot, humid summers and generally mild to cool winters. According to the Köppen Climate Classification system, Abbeville has a humid subtropical climate, abbreviated "Cfa" on climate maps.

Climate data for Abbeville, 1991–2020 simulated normals (436 ft elevation)
Month	Jan	Feb	Mar	Apr	May	Jun	Jul	Aug	Sep	Oct	Nov	Dec	Year
Mean daily maximum °F (°C)	59.4 (15.2)	63.3 (17.4)	70.5 (21.4)	77.4 (25.2)	84.7 (29.3)	89.4 (31.9)	91.2 (32.9)	90.5 (32.5)	86.9 (30.5)	78.8 (26.0)	68.9 (20.5)	61.7 (16.5)	76.9 (24.9)
Daily mean °F (°C)	48.4 (9.1)	52.0 (11.1)	58.5 (14.7)	65.1 (18.4)	73.2 (22.9)	79.0 (26.1)	81.1 (27.3)	80.4 (26.9)	76.5 (24.7)	67.3 (19.6)	57.0 (13.9)	50.7 (10.4)	65.8 (18.8)
Mean daily minimum °F (°C)	37.4 (3.0)	40.5 (4.7)	46.2 (7.9)	52.9 (11.6)	61.5 (16.4)	68.7 (20.4)	71.1 (21.7)	70.5 (21.4)	66.0 (18.9)	55.8 (13.2)	45.1 (7.3)	39.9 (4.4)	54.6 (12.6)
Average precipitation inches (mm)	5.14 (130.61)	4.85 (123.09)	4.94 (125.45)	4.33 (110.01)	3.32 (84.44)	4.75 (120.57)	6.14 (155.84)	5.02 (127.51)	3.92 (99.69)	2.96 (75.15)	4.06 (103.12)	5.40 (137.04)	54.83 (1,392.52)
Average dew point °F (°C)	39.7 (4.3)	42.4 (5.8)	46.8 (8.2)	53.2 (11.8)	60.8 (16.0)	68.2 (20.1)	71.2 (21.8)	70.9 (21.6)	66.6 (19.2)	57.0 (13.9)	47.7 (8.7)	42.8 (6.0)	55.6 (13.1)
Source: PRISM Climate Group

== Demographics ==
Historical population
Census	Pop.	Note	%±
1850	300		—
1890	465		—
1900	889		91.2%
1910	1,141		28.3%
1920	1,267		11.0%
1930	2,047		61.6%
1940	2,080		1.6%
1950	2,162		3.9%
1960	2,524		16.7%
1970	2,996		18.7%
1980	3,155		5.3%
1990	3,173		0.6%
2000	2,987		−5.9%
2010	2,688		−10.0%
2020	2,358		−12.3%
U.S. Decennial Census

=== Racial and ethnic composition ===
Abbeville city, Alabama – Racial and ethnic composition Note: the US Census treats Hispanic/Latino as an ethnic category. This table excludes Latinos from the racial categories and assigns them to a separate category. Hispanics/Latinos may be of any race.
Race / Ethnicity (NH = Non-Hispanic)	Pop 1980	Pop 1990	Pop 2000	Pop 2010	Pop 2020	% 1980	% 1990	% 2000	% 2010	% 2020
White alone (NH)	2,024	2,037	1,680	1,443	1,157	64.15%	64.20%	56.24%	53.68%	49.07%
Black or African American alone (NH)	1,090	1,114	1,185	1,110	1,034	34.55%	35.11%	39.67%	41.29%	43.85%
Native American or Alaska Native alone (NH)	0	6	0	2	5	0.00%	0.19%	0.00%	0.07%	0.21%
Asian alone (NH)	0	1	2	21	15	0.00%	0.03%	0.07%	0.78%	0.64%
Native Hawaiian or Pacific Islander alone (NH)	x	x	0	0	0	x	x	0.00%	0.00%	0.00%
Other race alone (NH)	0	0	0	0	9	0.00%	0.00%	0.00%	0.00%	0.38%
Mixed race or Multiracial (NH)	x	x	15	30	71	x	x	0.50%	1.12%	3.01%
Hispanic or Latino (any race)	41	15	105	82	67	1.30%	0.47%	3.52%	3.05%	2.84%
Total	3,155	3,173	2,987	2,688	2,358	100.00%	100.00%	100.00%	100.00%	100.00%

=== 2020 census ===
As of the 2020 census, Abbeville had a population of 2,358. There were 999 households and 604 families residing in the city.

The median age was 46.4 years. 20.9% of residents were under the age of 18 and 26.2% of residents were 65 years of age or older. For every 100 females there were 88.9 males, and for every 100 females age 18 and over there were 82.0 males age 18 and over.

0.0% of residents lived in urban areas, while 100.0% lived in rural areas.

There were 999 households in Abbeville, of which 26.0% had children under the age of 18 living in them. Of all households, 35.5% were married-couple households, 20.3% were households with a male householder and no spouse or partner present, and 38.9% were households with a female householder and no spouse or partner present. About 38.0% of all households were made up of individuals and 18.6% had someone living alone who was 65 years of age or older.

There were 1,246 housing units, of which 19.8% were vacant. The homeowner vacancy rate was 2.6% and the rental vacancy rate was 12.8%.

Abbeville first appeared on the 1850 U.S. Census. Although it did not report a separate population as a town from 1860 to 1880, it returned again in 1890 and has returned on every successive census to date. See also Abbeville precinct below, which includes the population of the city and surrounding area since 1860.

=== 2010 census ===
As of the census of 2010, there were 2,688 people, 1,077 households, and 699 families residing in the city. The population density was 192.0 inhabitants per square mile (74.1/km^{2}). There were 1,255 housing units at an average density of 80.4 per square mile (31.0/km^{2}). The racial makeup of the city was 54.4% White, 41.4% Black or African American, 1.0% Asian, 2.0% from other races, and 1.2% from two or more races. 3.1% of the population were Hispanic or Latino.

There were 1,077 households, out of which 24.9% had children under the age of 18 living with them, 41.1% were married couples living together, 19.1% had a female householder with no husband present, and 35.1% were non-families. 32.4% of all households were made up of individuals, and 16.3% had someone living alone who was 65 years of age or older. The average household size was 2.32 and the average family size was 2.94.

In the city, the population was spread out, with 22.0% under the age of 18, 7.5% from 18 to 24, 21.3% from 25 to 44, 25.5% from 45 to 64, and 23.7% who were 65 years of age or older. The median age was 44.3 years. For every 100 females, there were 85.1 males. For every 100 females age 18 and over, there were 93.1 males.

The median income for a household in the city was $28,533, and the median income for a family was $39,167. Males had a median income of $36,630 versus $25,302 for females. The per capita income for the city was $17,756. About 16.2% of families and 18.5% of the population were below the poverty line, including 25.2% of those under age 18 and 17.8% of those age 65 or over.

=== 2000 census ===
As of the census of 2000, there were 2,987 people, 1,172 households, and 787 families residing in the city. The population density was 192.0 inhabitants per square mile (74.1/km^{2}). There were 1,353 housing units at an average density of 86.9 per square mile (33.6/km^{2}). The racial makeup of the city was 56.65% White, 39.94% Black or African American, 0.07% Asian, 2.85% from other races, and 0.50% from two or more races. 3.52% of the population were Hispanic or Latino.

There were 1,172 households, out of which 27.2% had children under the age of 18 living with them, 45.8% were married couples living together, 17.8% had a female householder with no husband present, and 32.8% were non-families. 30.8% of all households were made up of individuals, and 17.4% had someone living alone who was 65 years of age or older. The average household size was 2.41 and the average family size was 3.01.

In the city, the population was spread out, with 22.9% under the age of 18, 8.4% from 18 to 24, 22.1% from 25 to 44, 22.8% from 45 to 64, and 23.8% who were 65 years of age or older. The median age was 42 years. For every 100 females, there were 82.6 males. For every 100 females age 18 and over, there were 78.2 males.

The median income for a household in the city was $23,266, and the median income for a family was $37,917. Males had a median income of $26,250 versus $20,603 for females. The per capita income for the city was $17,215. About 17.3% of families and 21.5% of the population were below the poverty line, including 21.1% of those under age 18 and 29.6% of those age 65 or over.

== Government ==
Abbeville is governed via a mayor-council government. The mayor is elected at-large. The city council consists of five members who are each elected from single-member districts.

== Education ==
Abbeville is a part of the Henry County Public Schools system. It operates the Abbeville High School and the Abbeville Elementary School.

Abbeville Christian Academy is a private high school in the city and one of the last "unofficially" segregated high schools in the country.

== Transportation ==
Intercity bus service is provided by Greyhound Lines.

== Media ==
Abbeville is served by one radio station, WESZ-LP.

Abbeville is served by a weekly newspaper, the Abbeville Herald, which has been in operation since 1915.

== Notable people ==
- Leroy Cook, former defensive end for the Dallas Cowboys
- Sharlene Newman, Cognitive Neuroscientist, AAAS Fellow
- William Oates, former U.S. Congressman for the 3rd District of Alabama and the 29th Governor of Alabama
- Chris Porter, former Auburn University basketball player and professional basketball player
- Jimmy Rane, founder / chairman / CEO of Great Southern Wood Preserving
- Al Richardson, former American football linebacker for the Atlanta Falcons
- Recy Taylor, an African-American woman activist whose rape in Abbeville by six white men was a catalyst for renewed actions of the nationwide Civil Rights Movement.
- Edward Vaughn, Black Power activist, bookstore owner, and member of the Michigan House of Representatives

== Gallery ==
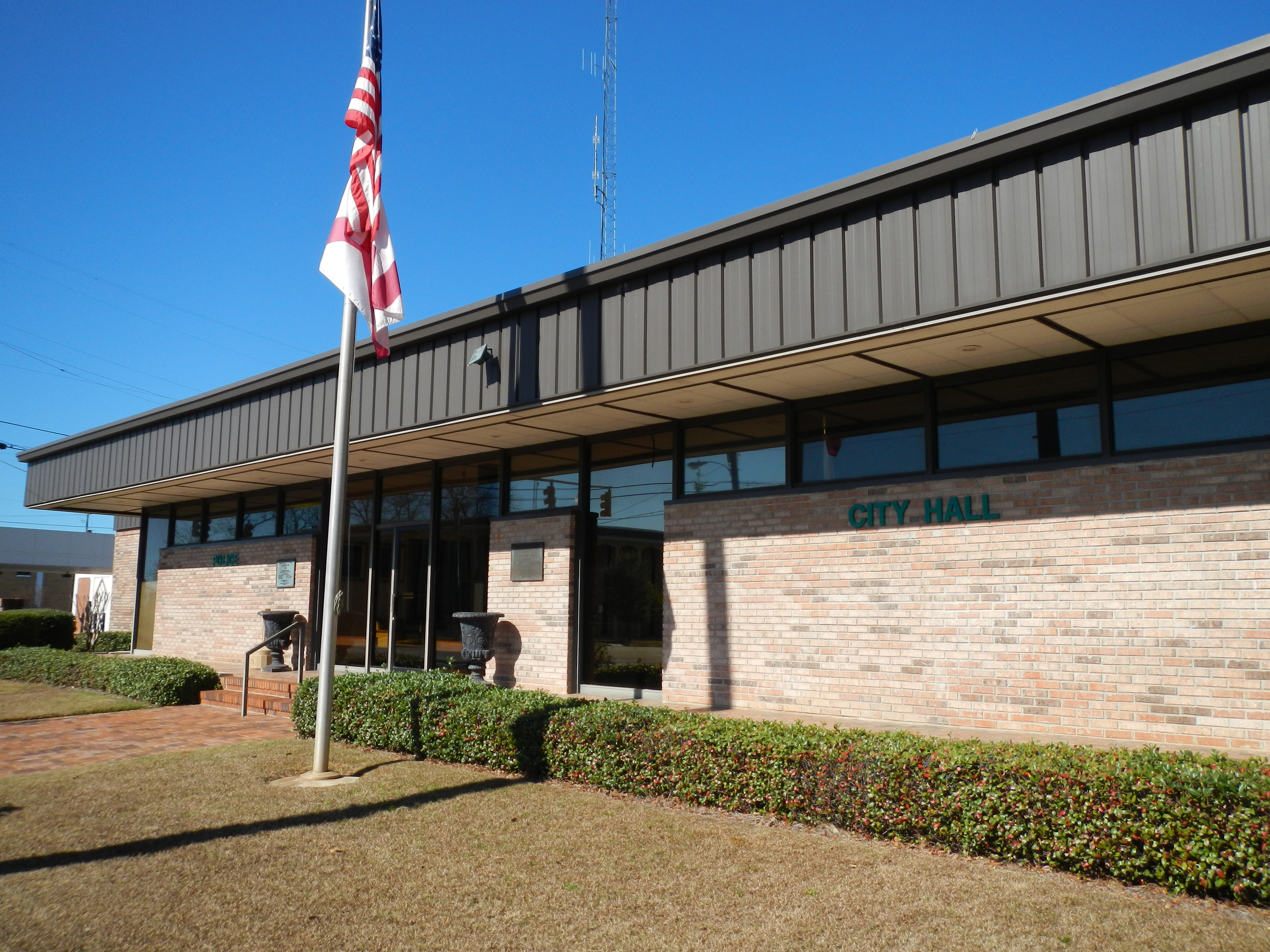
Abbeville City Hall and Police Department

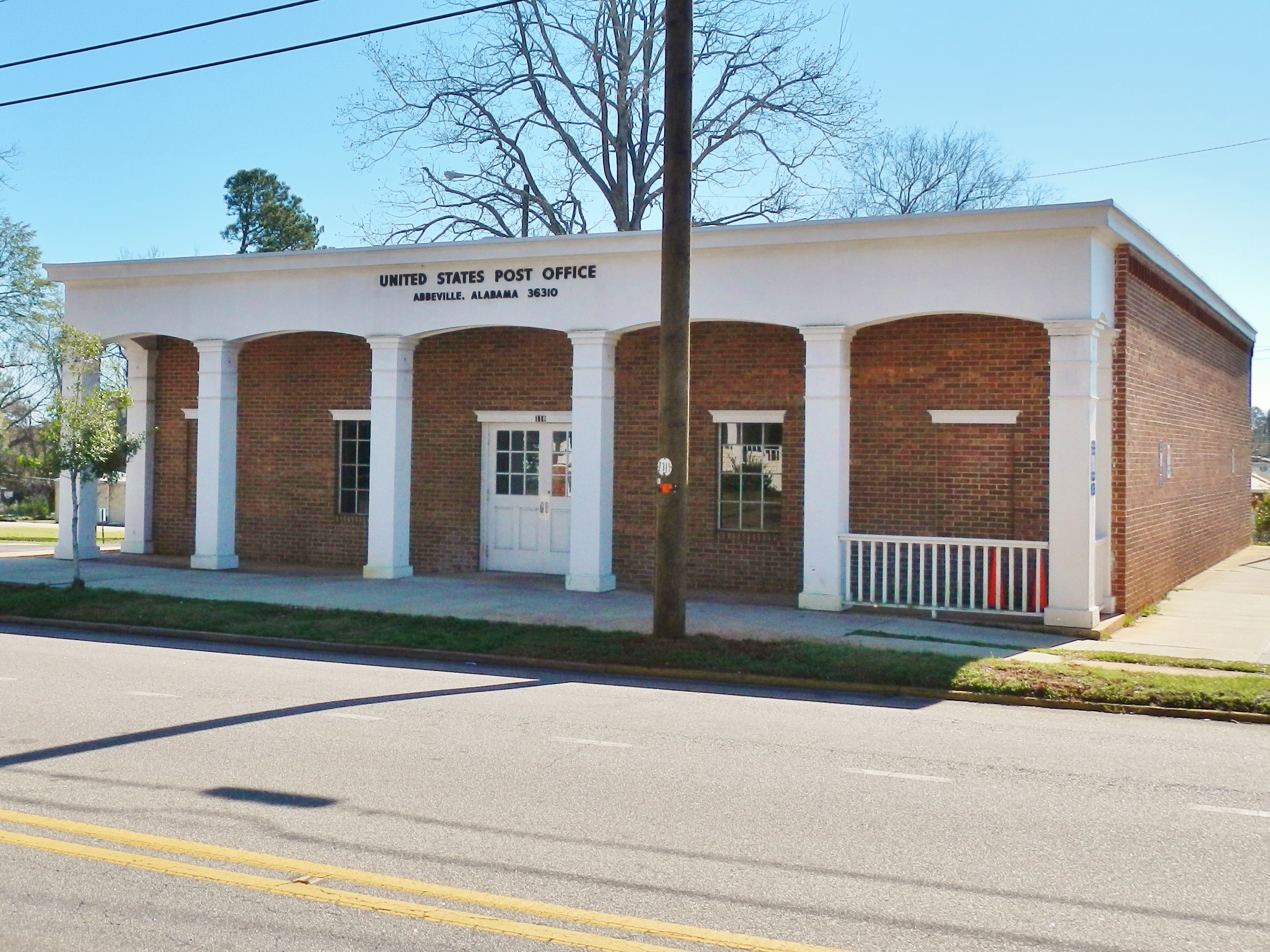
Abbeville Post Office (ZIP code: 36310)

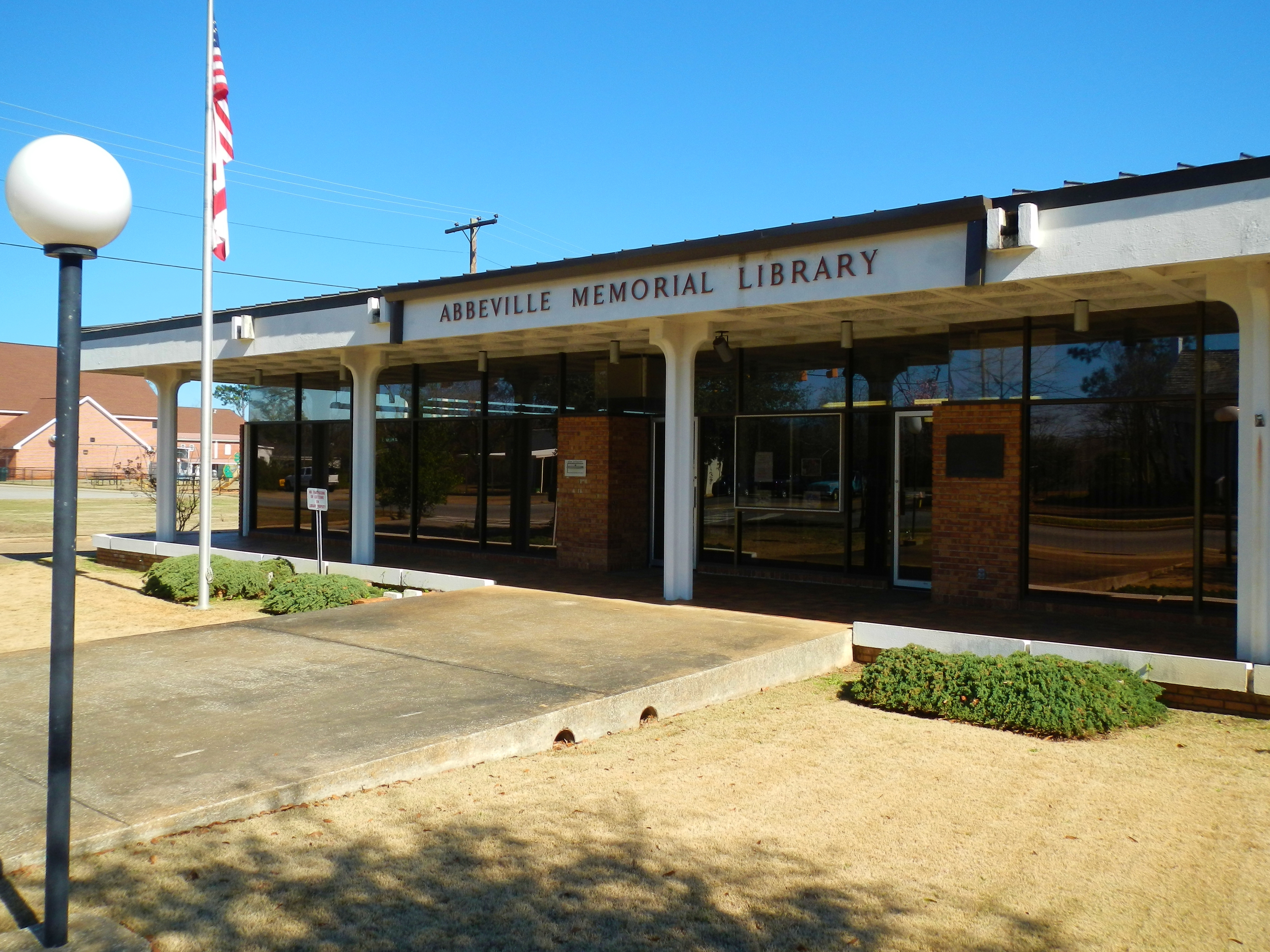
Abbeville Memorial Library

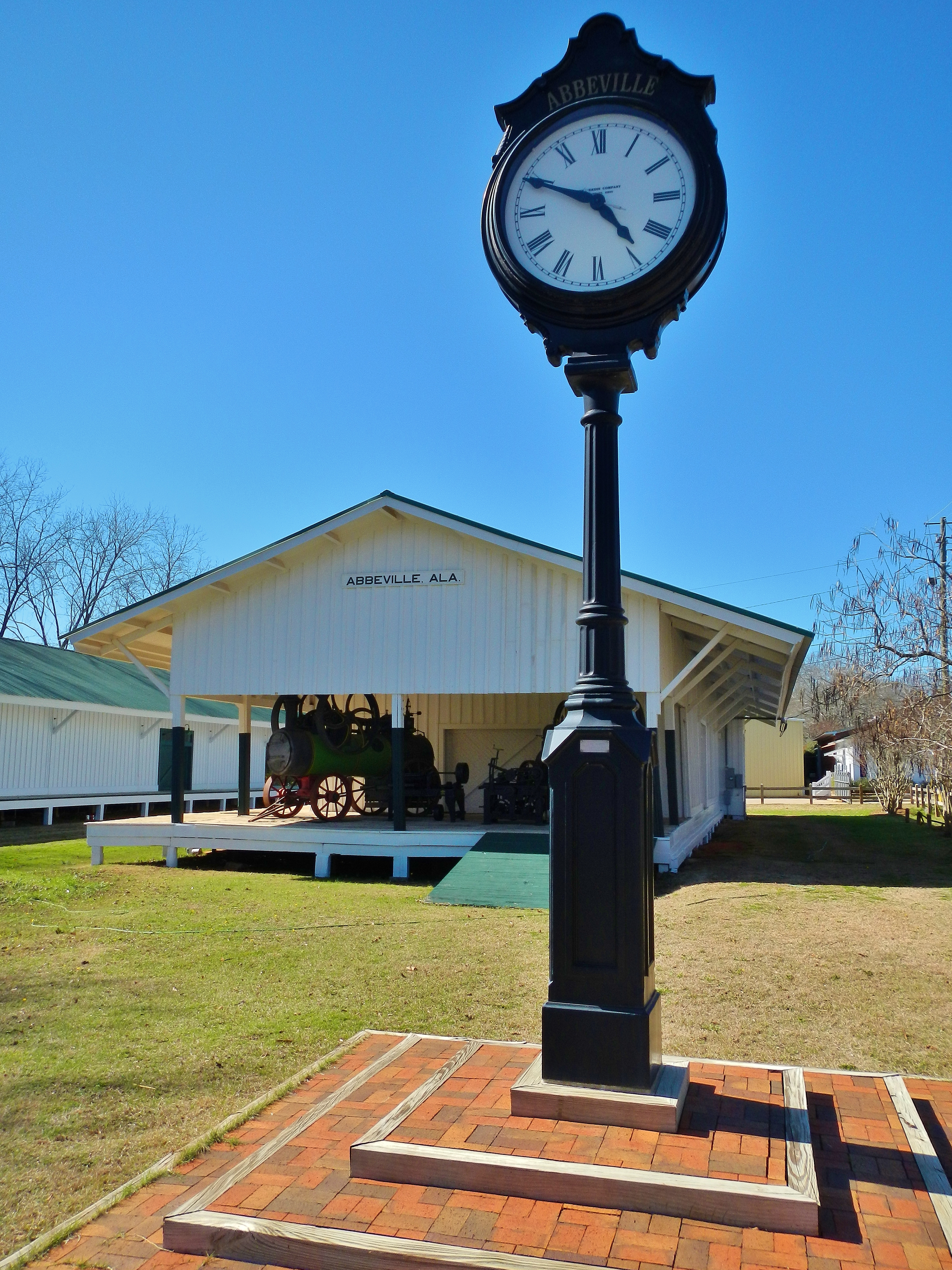
Atlantic Coast Line Railroad Depot in Abbeville

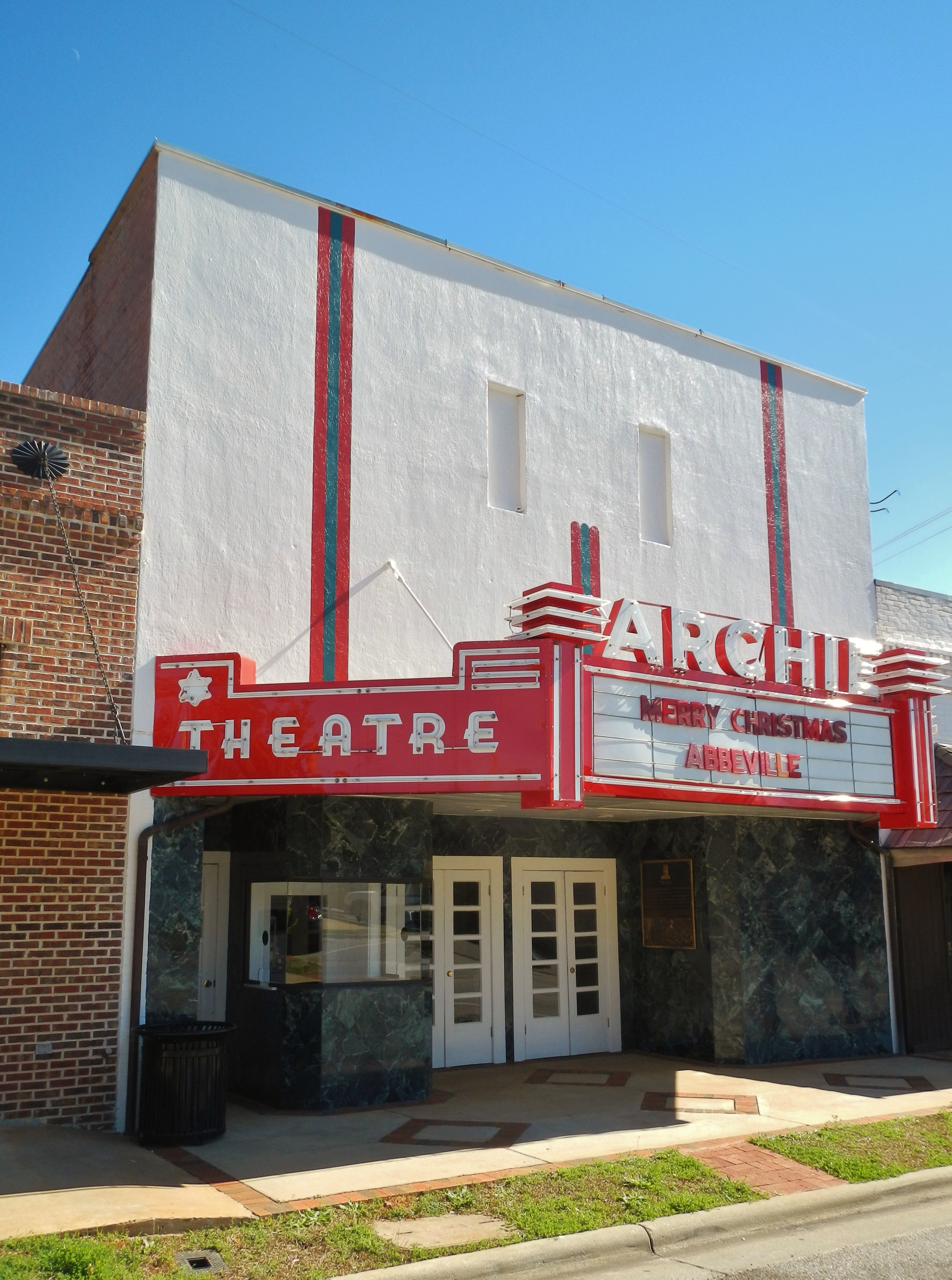
Archie Theatre was first opened in 1948

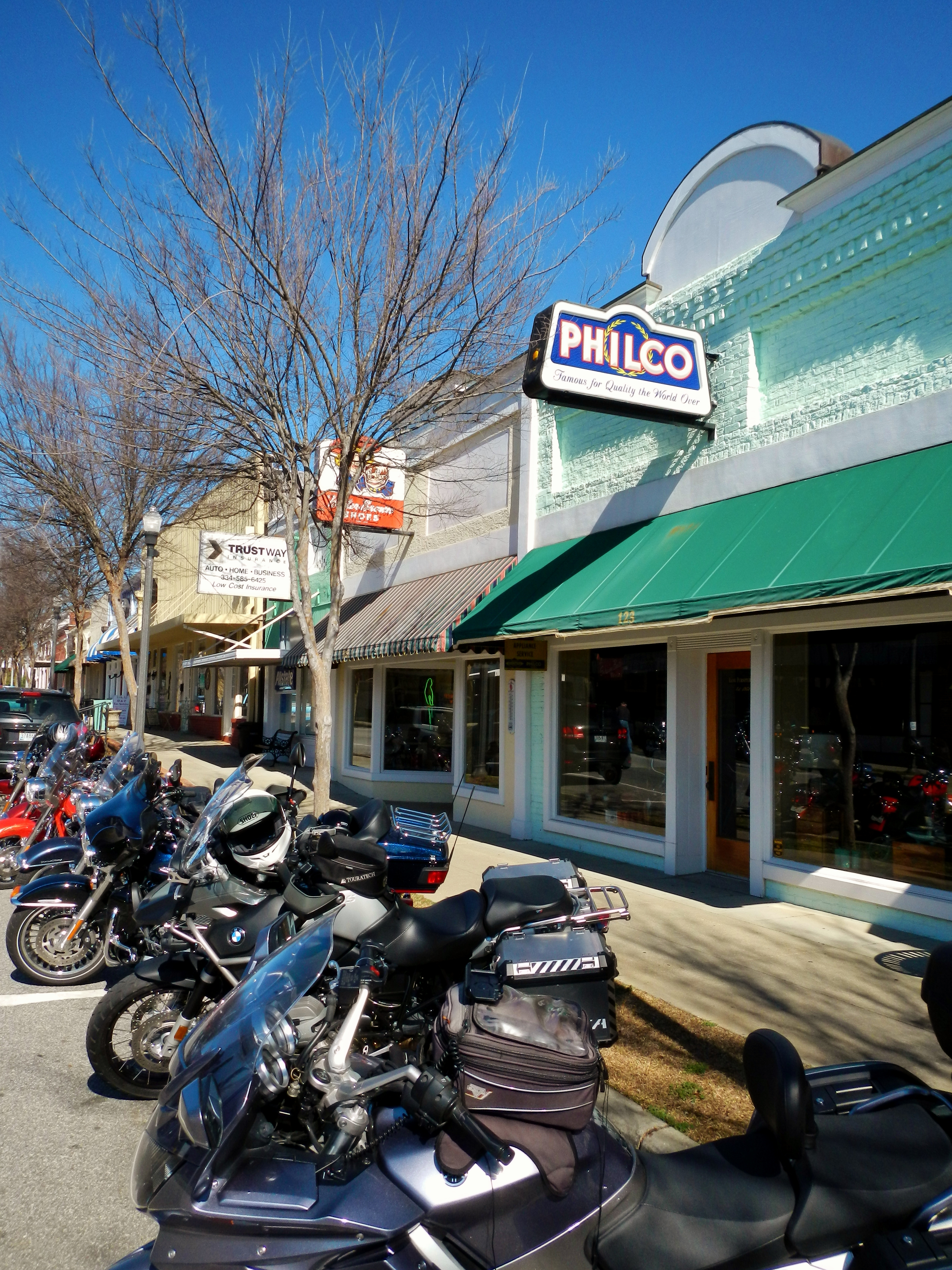
Historic Downtown Abbeville (2012)

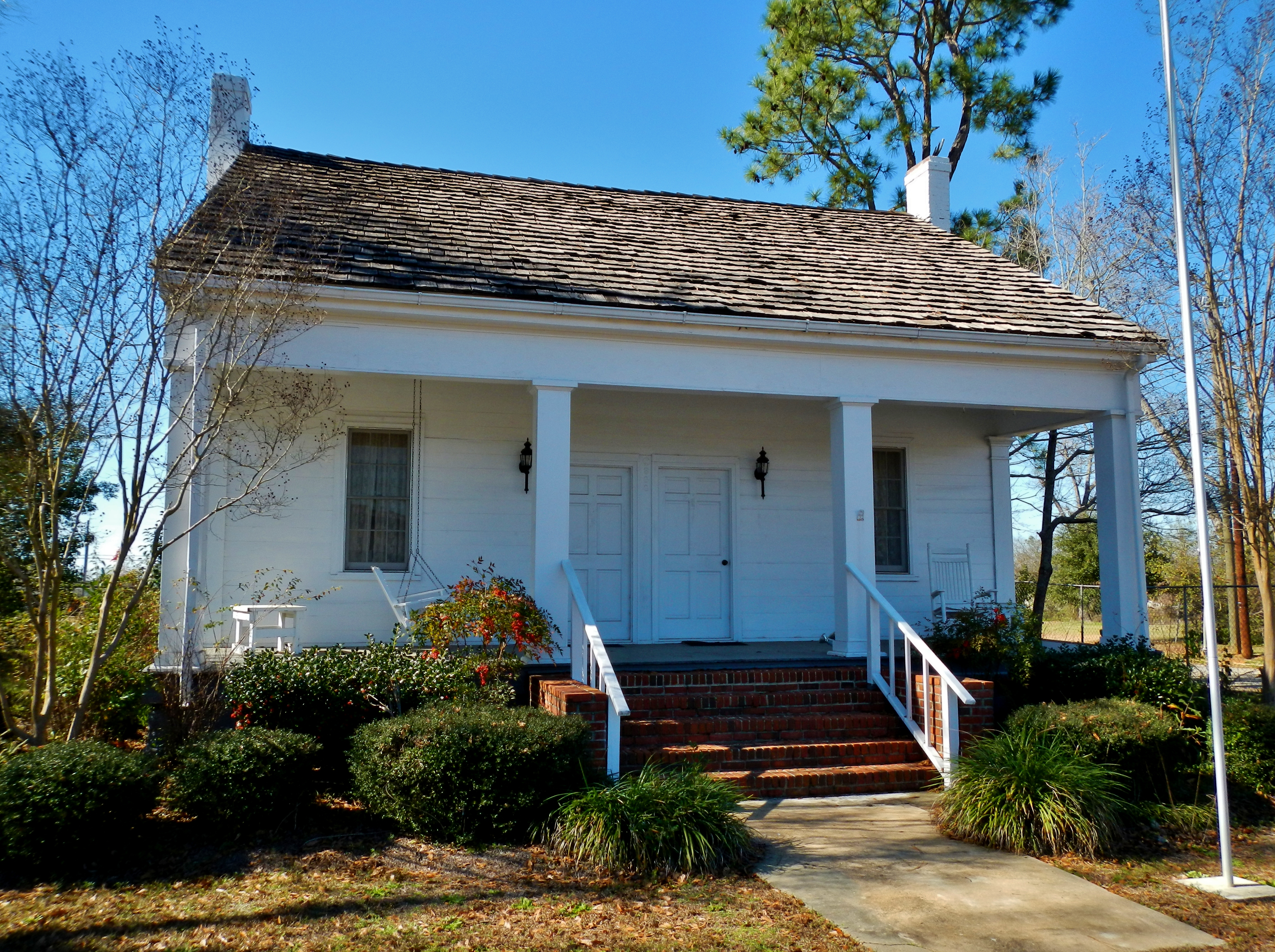
Bethune-Kennedy House is a dual front door, double pen Creole cottage; constructed circa 1840 is the oldest remaining structure in Abbeville. It was placed on the National Register of Historic Places in 1978.
