= Mount Ararat Cemetery =

Coordinates: 36°08′50″N 86°44′57″W

Details
- Established: 1867
- Location: Nashville, Tennessee
- Type: Private, secular
- Owned by: administered by nearby Greenwood Cemetery
- No. of interments: over 13,000
- Find a Grave: Mount Ararat Cemetery

Mount Ararat Cemetery is a historic cemetery in Nashville, Tennessee established in 1867 by and for African Americans.

A historical marker commemorates its history. In 1983 it was acquired by Greenwood Cemetery. One of the most notable markers is the grave of the Reverend Nelson G. Merry, the founding pastor of the First Baptist Church, Capitol Hill, in Nashville.

== Notable burials ==
- William Edmondson, sculptor
- Nelson Walker, businessman
- Moses McKissack III, architect
