= Moses McKissack III =

American architect (1879–1952)

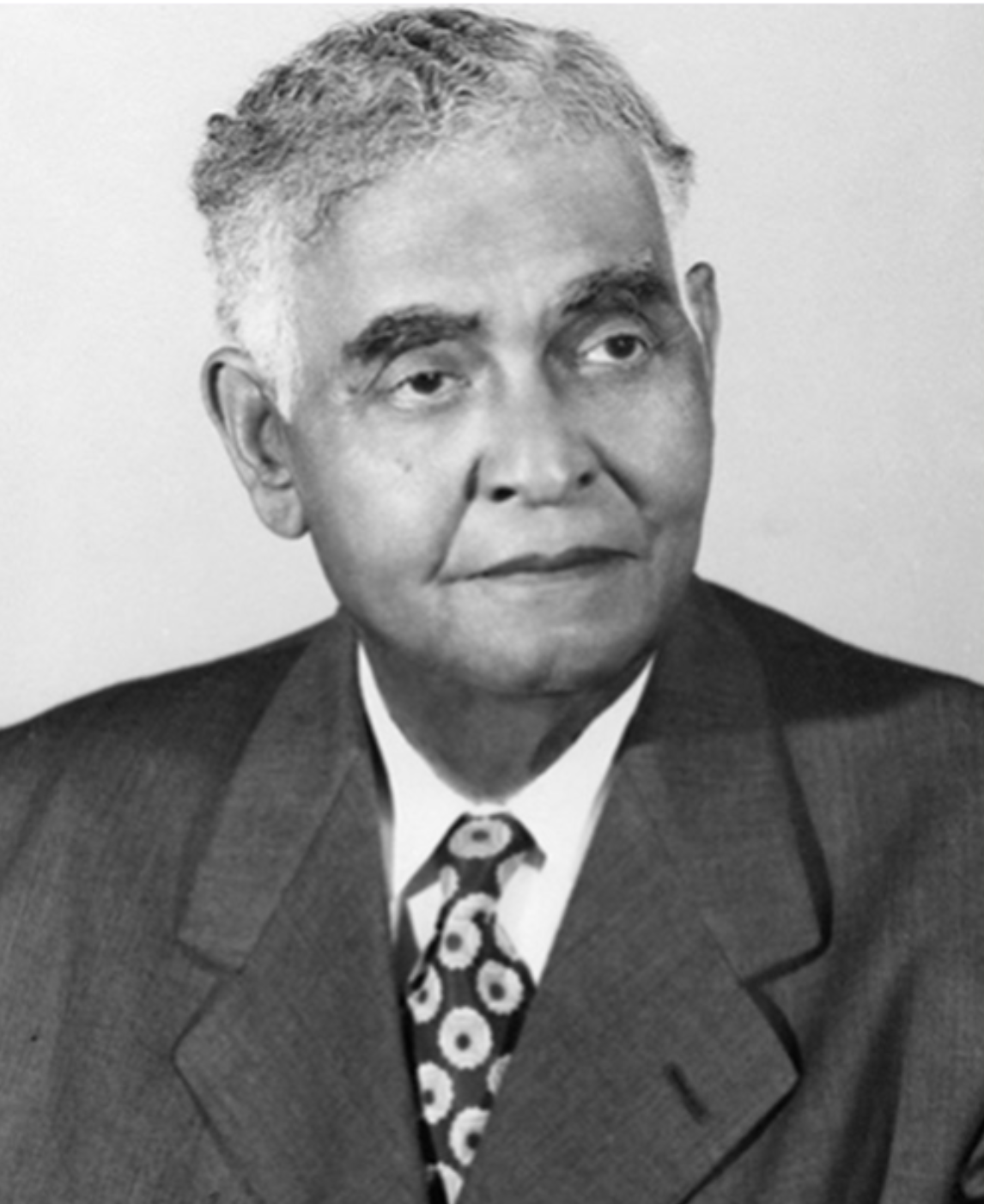
- Born: Gabriel Moses McKissack III; May 8, 1879; Pulaski, Giles County, Tennessee, U.S.
- Died: December 12, 1952 (aged 73); Nashville, Davidson County, Tennessee, U.S.
- Burial place: Mount Ararat Cemetery
- Education: Springfield College
- Occupation: Architect
- Spouse: Miranda P. Winter
- Children: 6
- Relatives: Calvin Lunsford McKissack (brother); Cheryl McKissack Daniel (granddaughter)

Moses McKissack III (1879–1952), was an American architect. He had his own architecture firm McKissack Company from 1905 until 1922, and was active in Tennessee and Alabama. In a partnership with his brother Calvin Lunsford McKissack, they founded the architecture firm McKissack & McKissack in 1922.

== Early life and education ==
Gabriel Moses McKissack III was born on May 8, 1879, in Pulaski, Tennessee. He had six brothers. His father Gabriel Moses McKissack II, whom he shared his name with, was a carpenter and builder; and his mother was Dolly Ann (née Maxwell).

His paternal grandfather Moses was from the Ashanti tribe (or Asante tribe, modern-day Ghana) and he was enslaved in 1790. His grandfather was purchased by William McKissack, a white builder who taught him the building trade. His grandfather married Mirian (1804–1865), who was Cherokee, and together they had fourteen children.

McKissack attended Pulaski Colored High School. He apprenticed in construction drawings for 5 years under James Porter. He also attended classes at Springfield College in Springfield, Massachusetts and obtained architectural degrees through a correspondence course. In 1896, McKissack had moved to prepared construction drawings for B. F. McGrew and Pitman & Peterson.

== Career ==
From 1895 until 1905, McKissack built houses in Decatur, Alabama; Mount Pleasant, Tennessee; and Columbia, Tennessee. Followed by a move to Nashville in 1905, in order to open his own architecture firm McKissack Company, initially located in the Napier Court Building. His first document client was Granberry Jackson Sr., the Dean of architecture and engineering at Vanderbilt University. After in which he designed many other residences for faculty at Vanderbilt University. The firm's first major project was design of the Fisk University Carnegie Library (1908). This is a two-story Classic Revival style building was constructed from brick with a stone columned porch, and features an interior light well; its cornerstone was laid in 1908 by William Howard Taft, then the U.S. Secretary of War. Major projects designed by Moses McKissack during the 1910s included the main campus building for the Turner Normal and Industrial School for Negroes (1912) in Shelbyville, Tennessee; dormitories for Roger Williams University in Nashville; and Lane College in Jackson, Tennessee. By 1920, Moses McKissack had acquired design clients throughout Nashville.

In 1912, he married Miranda P. Winter, together they had six sons.

In 1921, after the state of Tennessee instituted a registration law for architects, the McKissack brothers became two of the first registered architects in the state. In 1922, Calvin McKissack joined Moses and the brothers established the partnership of McKissack & McKissack.

In 1942, President Franklin D. Roosevelt appointed McKissack to the White House Conference on Housing Problems. In 1942, McKissack & McKissack received a large U.S. federal government contract to build and design the 99th Pursuit Squadron (Tuskegee Airmen) Air Base at Tuskegee, Alabama. The Air Base contract was the largest federal contract ever awarded to an African American company, valued at approximately US$5.8 million, and it made national news. The brothers were each awarded the Spaulding Medal by the National Negro Business League in 1942, for outstanding business achievements.

== Death and legacy ==
He died on December 12, 1952, in his home in Nashville. His funeral service was held at the church he was a member, Caper Memorial Christian Church.

The McKissack family helped build the city Nashville. The McKissack Park neighborhood, the McKissack Park, and McKissack Middle School, all of which are in Nashville were named in his honor. A number of McKissack buildings are listed as National Register of Historic Places by the United States National Park Service.

== Works ==
- Roger Williams University dorms, Nashville, Tennessee
- Lane College, Jackson, Tennessee
- Granberry Jackson Sr. residence (now Kappa Alpha Theta fraternity house at Vanderbilt University), 204 24th Avenue South, Nashville, Tennessee
- Carnegie Library (1908), 17th Avenue North, Fisk University campus, Nashville, Tennessee. NRHP-listed.
- Turner Industrial School main building (1912), Shelbyville, Tennessee
- House residence (1919), 340 Chesterfield, Nashville, Tennessee
- Comer residence (1920), 1411 Eastland Avenue, Nashville, Tennessee
- Bastian residence (1921), 3722 Central Avenue, Nashville, Tennessee
- Sexton residence (1921), 3506 Byron Avenue, Nashville, Tennessee
- George Hubbard House (1921), 1109 First Avenue South, Nashville. Colonial Revival, NRHP-listed

== See also ==
- African-American architects
