= Cameron High School =

Cameron High School may refer to:

- Cameron High School (West Virginia) in Cameron, West Virginia
- Cameron School in Nashville, Tennessee, a former school for African Americans
- Cameron High School in Cameron, Missouri
