= McKissack & McKissack =

American design and construction firm (1905–present)

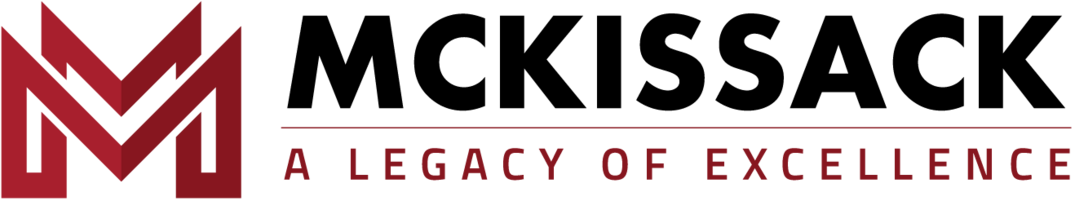
- Industry: Architecture; Engineering; Construction
- Founded: 1905; 121 years ago, as solo firm 1922, as McKissack & McKissack partnership
- Founder: Moses McKissack III; Calvin Lunsford McKissack
- Headquarters: United States
- Area served: New York, Pennsylvania, New Jersey, Connecticut, Georgia, and Louisiana
- Key people: Cheryl McKissack Daniel (President, CEO)
- Services: Construction management; Program management; Project management
- Website: mckissack.com

McKissack & McKissack is an American design, program management and construction firm based in New York. It is the oldest Black-owned architecture and construction company in the United States.

The firm was founded in 1905 in Nashville, Tennessee by Moses McKissack, the grandson of an enslaved person brought to the United States from West Africa and put to work making bricks. Moses III became an accomplished carpenter and eventually teamed with his brother Calvin McKissack to found the company.

Over its 120-year history, the company has completed over 6,000 public- and privately-funded planning, design, and construction projects.

== History ==
The firm was founded by Moses McKissack III in 1905, who was later joined by his brother Calvin Lunsford McKissack (February 23, 1890 – March 2, 1968) to form the McKissack & McKissack partnership in 1922. The brothers were natives of Pulaski, Tennessee. Their father (Moses McKissack II) and grandfather (Moses McKissack) were both trained builders. Moses McKissack was sold into slavery after being captured in West Africa and was sold to an American contractor named William McKissack of North Carolina. Moses was trained to make bricks for construction projects and became a master builder. When Moses was eventually granted his freedom, he began to sell his bricks.

Moses McKissack II became a master carpenter and built the gingerbread finishes on the Maxwell House Hotel. Moses McKissack III entered the architecture trade by working as an apprentice to a builder in Pulaski who hired him in 1890 to assist with architectural designs, drawings and building construction. His formal education was obtained at the Pulaski Colored High School. Calvin McKissack was educated at Fisk University in Nashville, which he attended from 1905 to 1909. Both brothers obtained architectural degrees through a correspondence course.

=== Early projects ===
Between 1895 and 1905, Moses McKissack built houses in Decatur, Alabama, and Mount Pleasant and Columbia, Tennessee. In 1905, Moses officially launched McKissack & McKissack as a construction firm. Also in 1905, Moses received a commission to build a new house for the dean of architecture and engineering at Vanderbilt University in Nashville. He opened his first architectural office in Nashville in 1907. The firm's first major project was to design the Carnegie Library on the Fisk University campus, a two-story Classic Revival building constructed from brick with a stone columned porch, featuring an interior light well. Its cornerstone was laid in 1908 by William Howard Taft, then the U.S. Secretary of War.

Significant projects designed by Moses McKissack during the 1910s include the dormitories for Roger Williams University in Nashville and Lane College in Jackson, Tennessee. From 1918 and 1922, Moses designed more than one dozen residences in Nashville and Belle Meade, largely in the Colonial Revival style.

Calvin McKissack started an independent practice in Dallas, Texas, in 1912, specializing in the design and construction of dormitories and black schools. In 1915, he returned to Tennessee, becoming superintendent of industries and a teacher of architectural drawing at the Tennessee Agricultural and Industrial State Normal School. In 1918, Calvin joined the faculty of Pearl High School as director of the industrial arts department and later became the first executive secretary of the Tennessee State Association of Teachers in Colored Schools. In 1921, McKissack & McKissack built the historic Hubbard House in Nashville. When Tennessee instituted a registration law for architects in 1922, the McKissack brothers were initially denied their licenses. However, after petitioning the state and obtaining architectural degrees, the brothers got their licenses and became the first licensed black architects in the United States

Moses McKissack III died on December 12, 1952. Calvin McKissack remained with the firm until he died in 1968. William DeBerry McKissack, the youngest son of Moses III, then succeeded his uncle as president of the firm. After suffering a stroke, he retired due to illness, and his wife, Leatrice Buchanan McKissack, became chief executive officer.

Leatrice's daughter Cheryl McKissack Daniel opened a McKissack & McKissack office in New York City in 1990. In 2000, Cheryl McKissack Daniel bought the company from her mother and dissolved the original business, paying out shareholders and closing their offices in the south. She then re-established McKissack & McKissack as sole owner of the company. The company closed its Nashville office in May 2002, making its New York City offices its corporate headquarters.

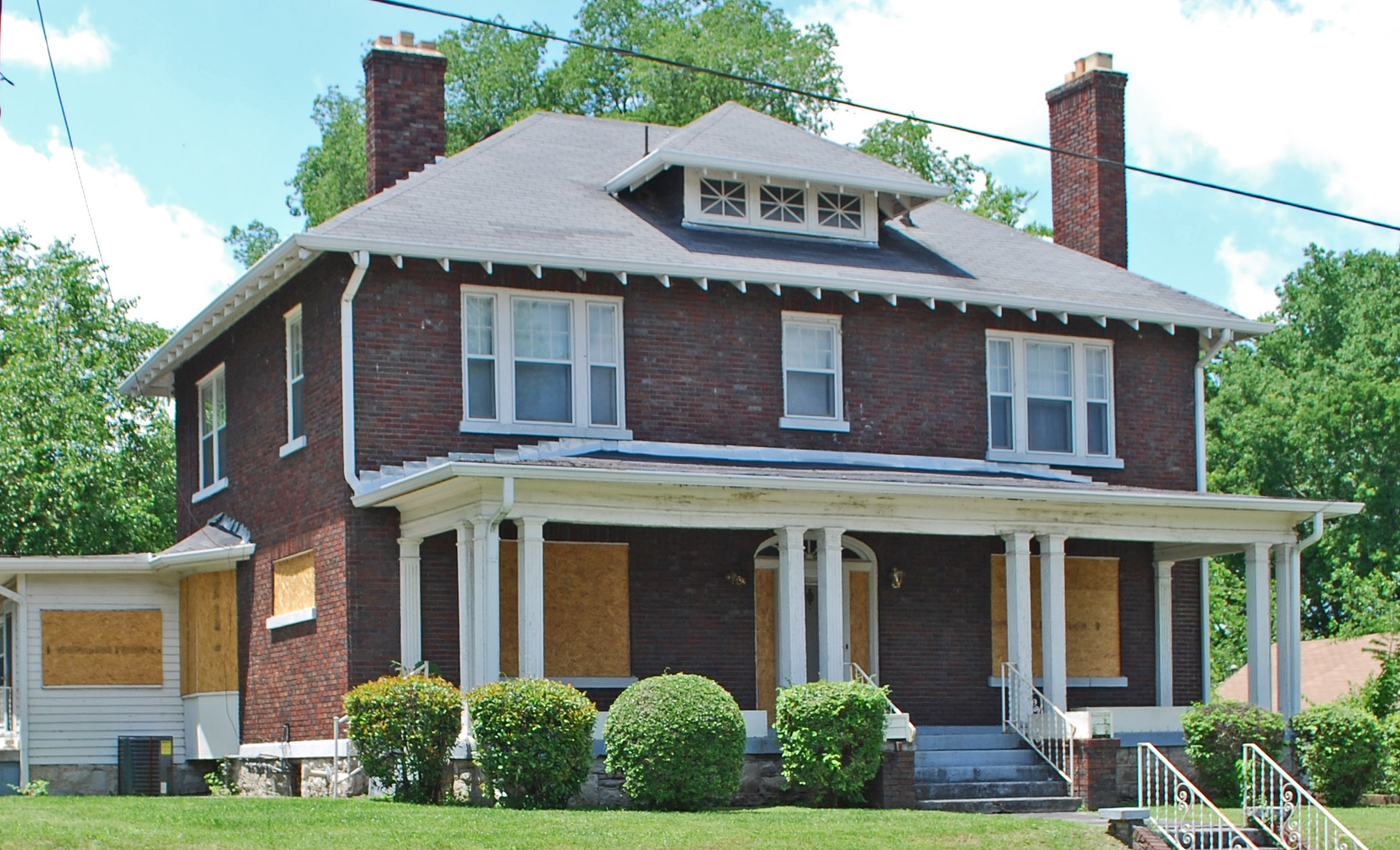
Hubbard House (1920) Nashville

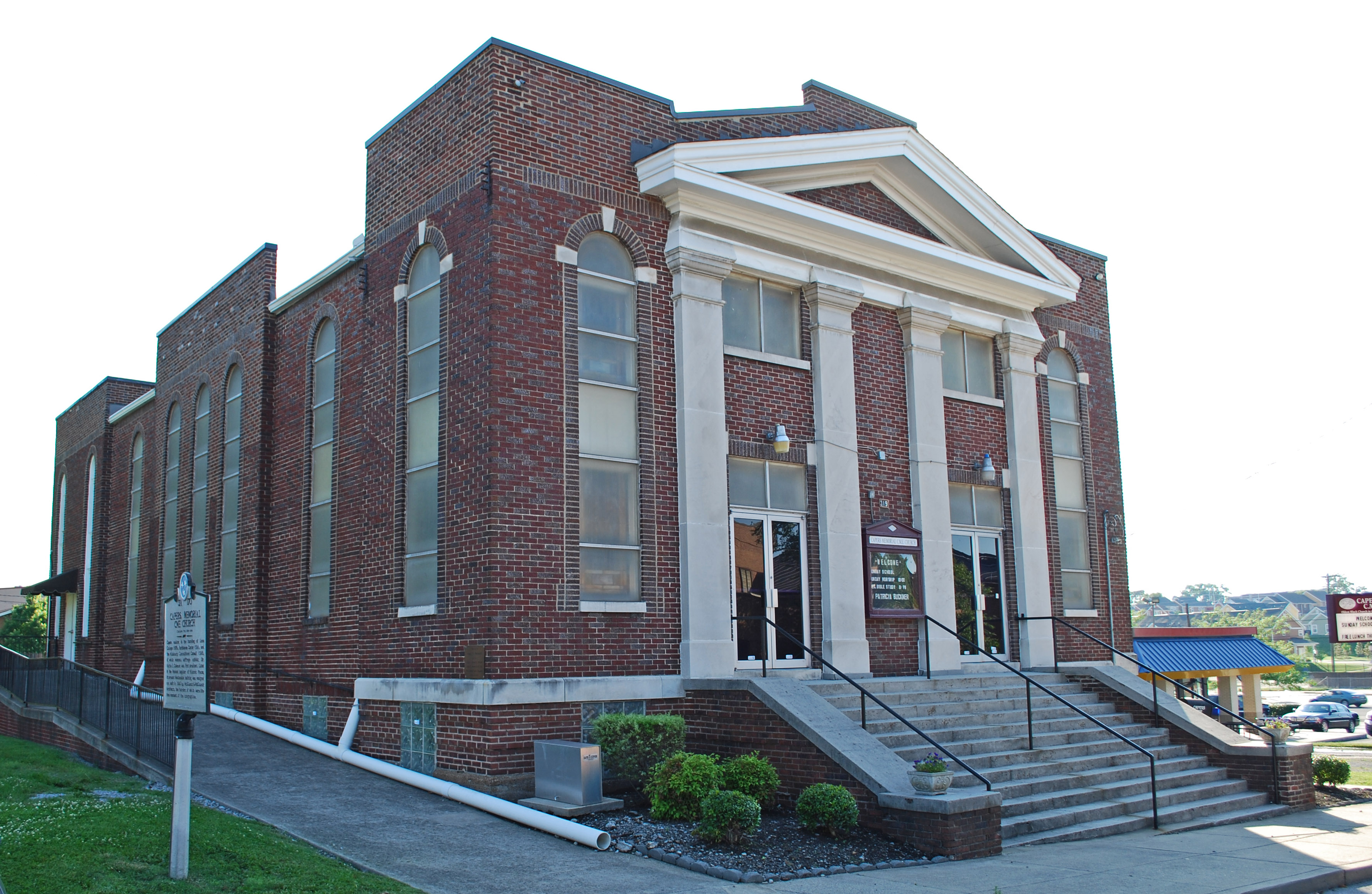
Capers C.M.E. Church (1925) Nashville

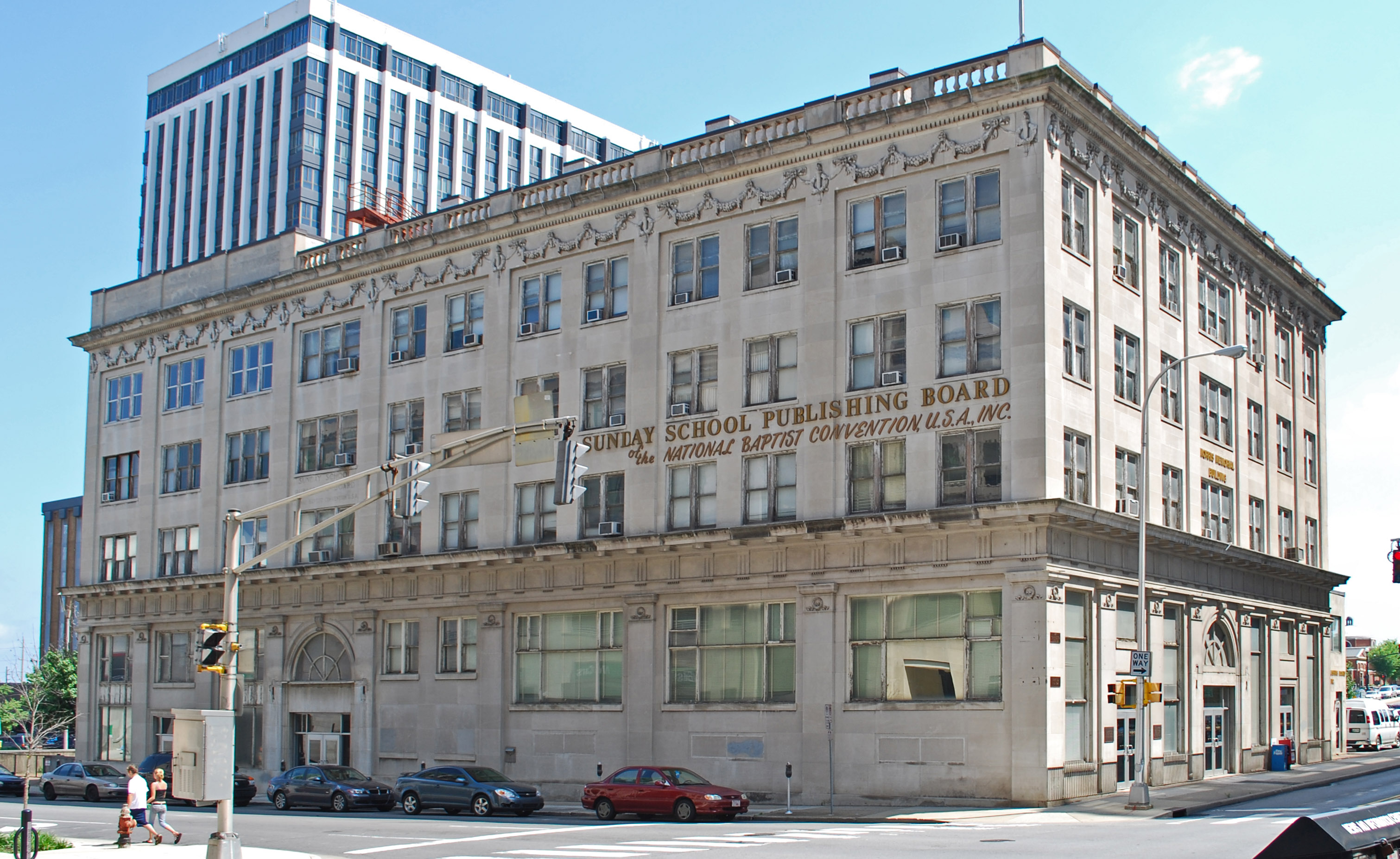
Morris Memorial Building (1925) Nashville

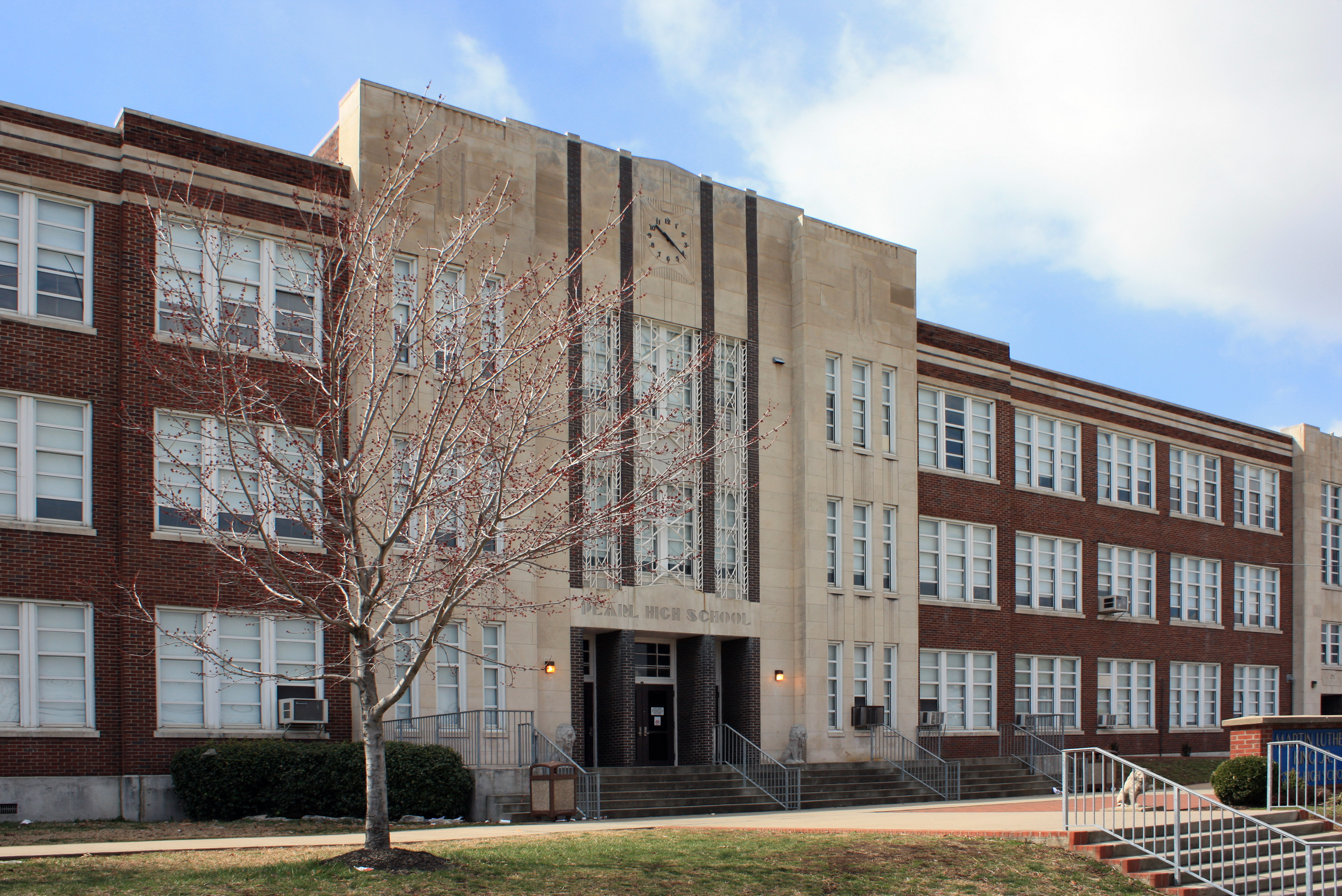
Martin Luther King Magnet at Pearl High School (1937)

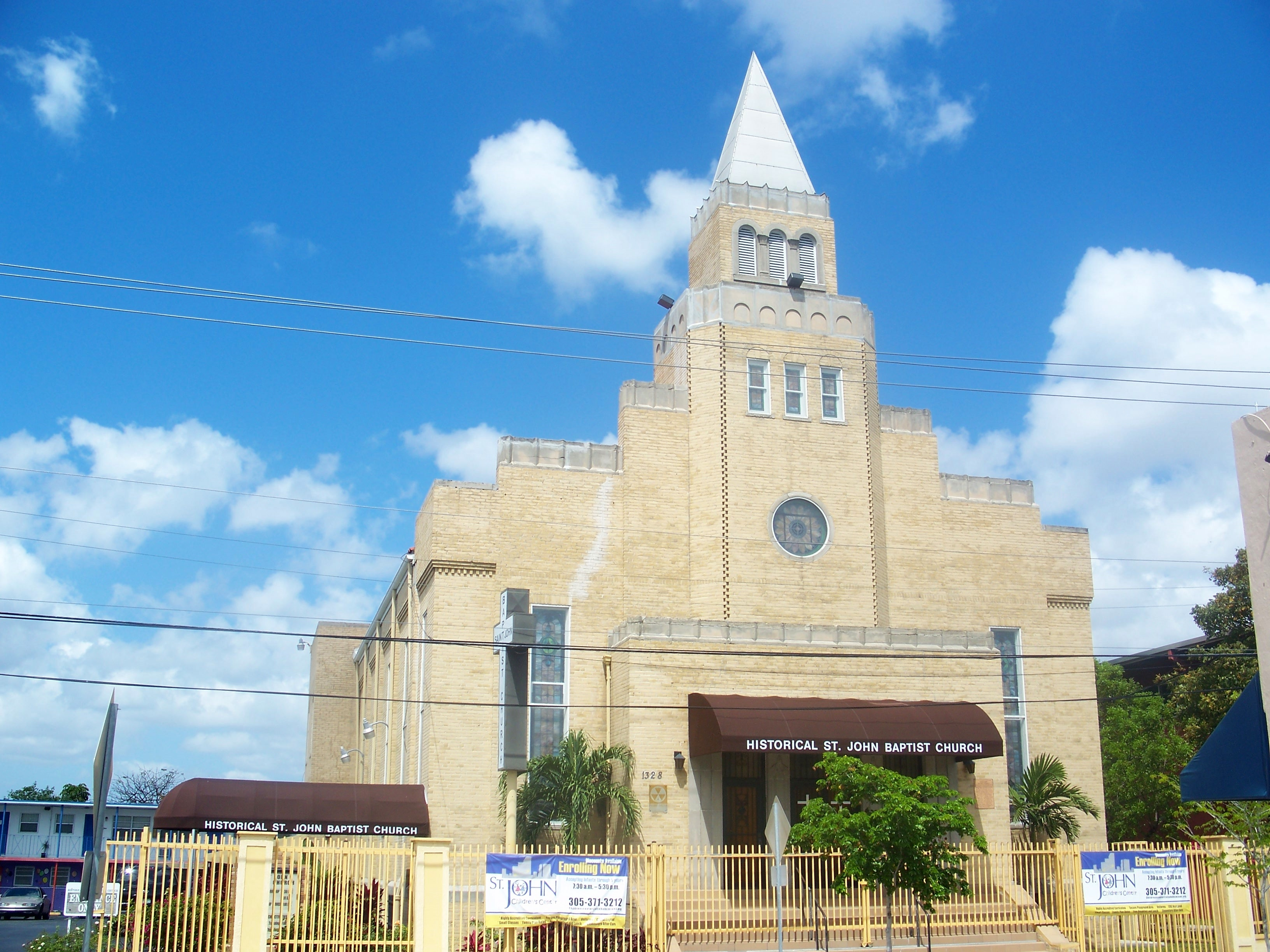
St. John's Baptist Church (1940) Miami

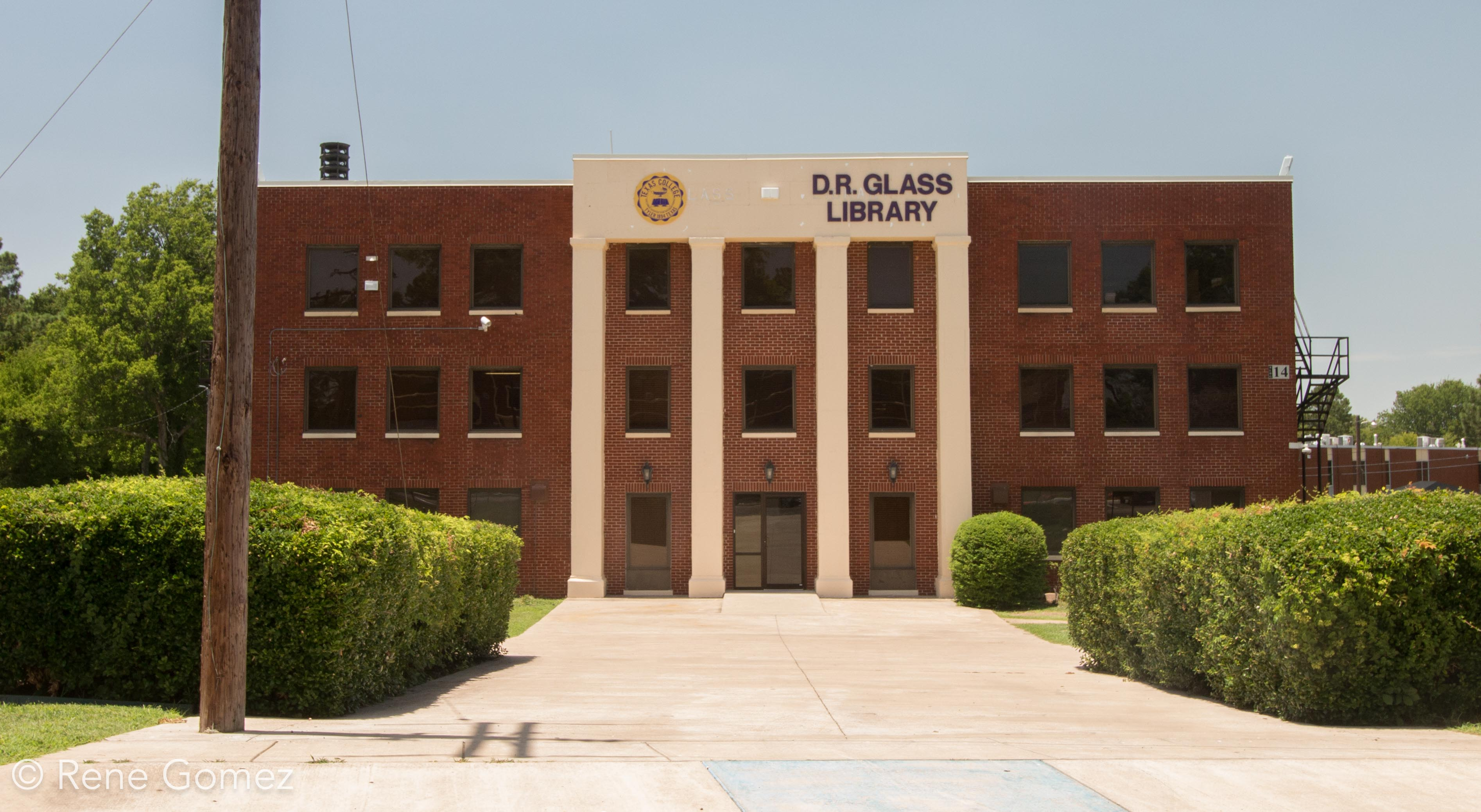
D.R. Glass Library (1948) at Texas College

== Operations ==
McKissack & McKissack is headquartered in Manhattan, with additional offices in Philadelphia and Mount Vernon. Since her 2000 purchase of the company, McKissack Daniel has served as CEO and President. As of 2019, McKissack & McKissack has approximately 150 employees.

== Works ==
As of 1975, McKissack & McKissack had completed over 3,000 building projects, including about 2,000 churches. Several buildings designed by Moses McKissack, Calvin McKissack, or the McKissack & McKissack firm are listed on the National Register of Historic Places (NRHP).

=== As Moses McKissack III ===
- Carnegie Library (1908), 17th Avenue North, Fisk University campus, Nashville, Tennessee. NRHP-listed.
- Turner Industrial School's main building (1912), Shelbyville, Tennessee
- House residence (1919), 340 Chesterfield, Nashville, Tennessee
- George Hubbard House (1920), 1109 First Avenue South, Nashville. Colonial Revival, NRHP-listed.
- Comer residence (1920), 1411 Eastland Avenue, Nashville, Tennessee
- Bastian residence (1921), 3722 Central Avenue, Nashville, Tennessee
- Sexton residence (1921), 3506 Byron Avenue, Nashville, Tennessee

=== As McKissack & McKissack ===
- Capers C.M.E. Church (1925), 319 15th Ave., N. Nashville, Tennessee. Completed in 1925. NRHP-listed.
- Morris Memorial Building (1925), 330 Charlotte Ave., Nashville, Tennessee. NRHP-listed.
- National Civil Rights Museum (1925), Memphis, Tennessee
- Washington Junior High (1927), Nashville, Tennessee
- Tennessee State University Memorial Library (1927), Nashville, Tennessee
- C.M.E. Publishing House (1931–1970s), Jackson, Tennessee. Art Deco; demolished in the 1970s.
- A.M.E. Publishing House, Eighth Avenue South, Nashville, Tennessee. Art Deco; demolished in the 1970s.
- Bridgeforth High School (1936), 1095 Bledsoe Road, Pulaski, Tennessee. NRHP-listed.
- Ford Green Elementary (1937), Nashville, Tennessee
- Pearl High School (1937), 613 17th Avenue North, Nashville, Tennessee. NRHP-listed.
- Henry Allen and Georgia Bradford Boyd House (1930s), 1601 Meharry Boulevard, Nashville, Tennessee
- Cameron School (1940), 1034 First Avenue South, Nashville, Tennessee. NRHP-listed.
- St. John's Baptist Church (1940), 1328 N.W. 3rd Ave., Miami, Florida. NRHP-listed.
- President's House at Texas College (1942), 2404 North Grand Avenue, Tyler, Texas. NRHP-listed.
- Taborian Hospital (1942), US 61, jct. of McGinnis St., Mound Bayou, Mississippi. NRHP-listed
- D.R. Glass Library (1948) at Texas College, 2404 N. Grand Avenue, Tyler, Texas. NRHP-listed
- Universal Life Insurance Company (1949), 480 Linden Ave., Memphis, Tennessee. NRHP-listed.
