= Pearl-Cohn Comprehensive High School =

Pearl-Cohn Entertainment Magnet High School

Location
- 904 26th Avenue, North; Nashville, Tennessee 37208; United States; 36.1643234°N 86.8171279°W

Information
- Type: Public
- Established: 1983
- Principal: Miriam Harrington
- Staff: 32.05 (FTE)
- Grades: 9–12
- Enrollment: 545 (2023–2024)
- Student to teacher ratio: 17.00
- Colors: Red, white and black
- Nickname: Firebirds
- Website: https://pearlcohn.mnps.org/

Pearl-Cohn Entertainment Magnet School (or simply Pearl High School) is a public magnet high school located in Nashville, Tennessee.

== History ==
Pearl High School, the predecessor and namesake for Pearl-Cohn, was a traditionally black public school. It was one of two black high schools in Nashville, (rival Cameron High School being the other) with Pearl accepting its first white student in 1971. The original Pearl High School building built in 1937 (a historical site) has been reconfigured as Martin Luther King Magnet at Pearl High School.

Pearl-Cohn was established in 1983 when Pearl High School and Cohn High School merged to form Pearl Cohn Comprehensive High School. Its campus was built in 1986 to replace the former Cohn High School and Pearl High School.

== Distinctions ==
Pearl-Cohn Entertainment Magnet High School is the only entertainment magnet high school in the country. The school includes grades 9–12 with students matriculating from Moses McKissack and John Early Middle Schools.

Pearl-Cohn is organized into three academies: the Freshman Academy, the Academy of Entertainment Industry, and the Academy of Health Sciences. Pearl-Cohn Entertainment Magnet High School provides a range of both collegiate preparatory courses and career-track courses. The integrated curriculum includes pathways in music business, style and image consultancy, music recording, and broadcasting. Students enter their area of interest in their sophomore year and work to prepare to meet the State and District requirement of three courses in a concentrated area.

On May 8, 2013, the school opened a state-of-the-art, $1.2 million recording studio, complete with commercial equipment including a 32-channel mixing console, effect processors, and two editing suites. In partnership with Warner Music Group, Pearl-Cohn is the first school in the nation to house a student-run recording label affiliated with a major record label. Students have the opportunity to work with artists in phases including song creation, production, and distribution. The Pearl-Cohn label operates similarly to a traditional corporate model, but with profits benefitting music education.

== 2009–10 cluster changes ==
Beginning with the 2009–10 school year, the Pearl-Cohn cluster included a larger geographic area that was previously zoned to Hillsboro and Hillwood High Schools. This plan become controversial as many economically disadvantaged and African American students were zoned away from more diverse high schools.

== Sports ==
Pearl-Cohn students participate in wrestling, volleyball, tennis, golf, cheerleading, bowling, cross country, basketball, and football.
