= Capers C.M.E. Church =

Historic church in Tennessee, United States

- U.S. National Register of Historic Places
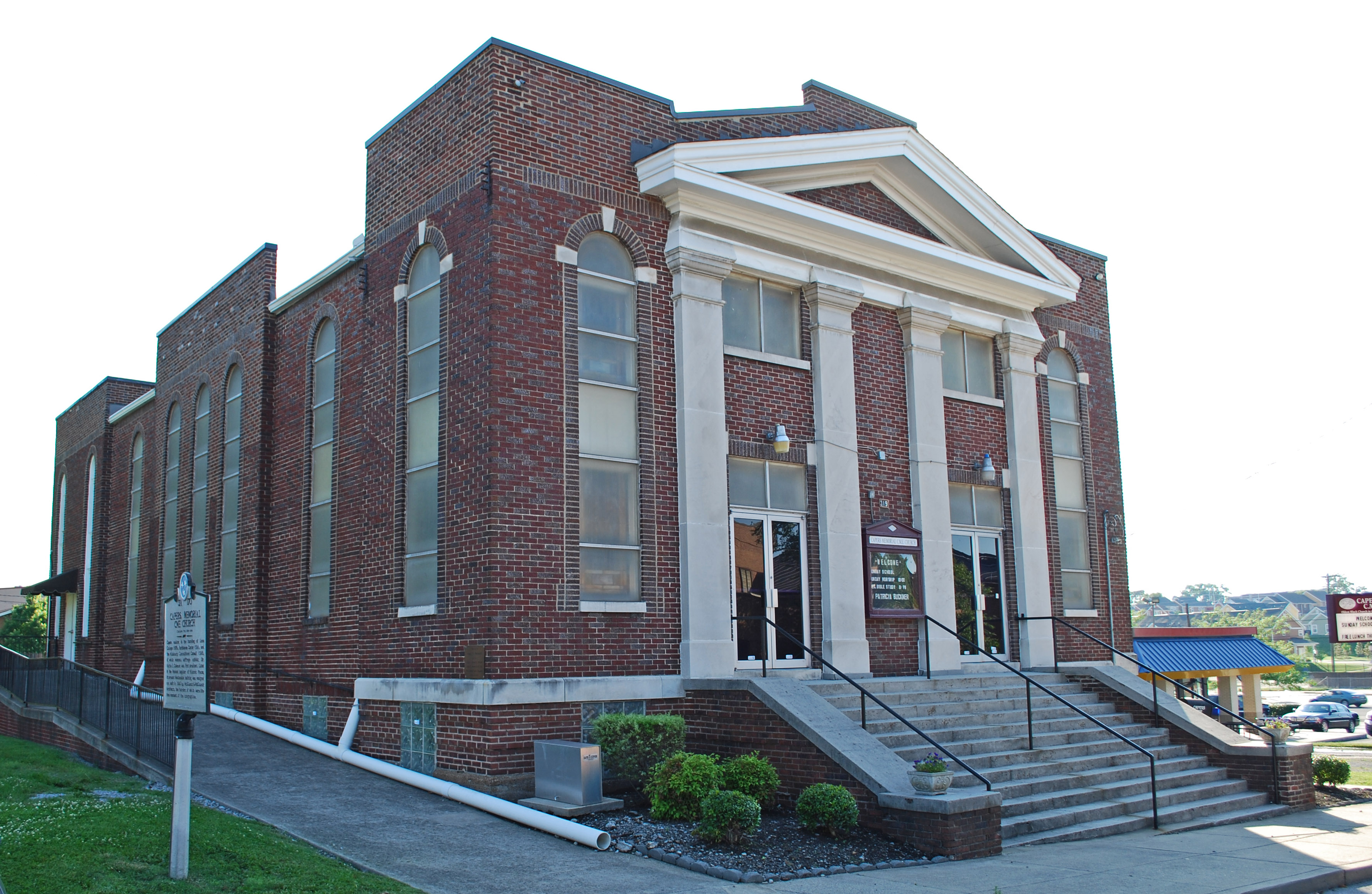

- Location within Tennessee Location within the United States
- Location: 319 15th Avenue North, Nashville, Tennessee, U.S.
- Coordinates: 36°9′34″N 86°47′43″W
- Area: 0.1 acres (0.040 ha)
- Built: 1925
- Architect: McKissack & McKissack
- Architectural style: Classical Revival
- MPS: McKissack and McKissack Buildings TR
- NRHP reference No.: 85000045
- Added to NRHP: January 2, 1985

Capers C.M.E. Church, is a historic Christian Methodist Episcopal church built in 1925 in Nashville, Tennessee. It is also known as Caper Memorial Christian Church, and Capers Memorial C.M.E. Church.

It was added to the National Register of Historic Places on January 2, 1985.

== History ==
The congregation was originally founded as the McKendree African Mission in 1832, near Sulphur Springs. The church was located on Hynes Street and was renamed in 1851 as Capers Chapel in honor of its founder Bishop William C. Capers. In 1870, the Capers Chapel became a member of the Colored Methodist Episcopal Church (C.M.E.) (also known as Christian Methodist Episcopal Church), a Black denomination of Wesleyan Methodism.

It was designed in a Neo-Classic style by African-American founded architectural firm McKissack & McKissack. Moses McKissack III of the architectural firm McKissack & McKissack was a church member. The structure is a two-story masonry building, with four stone Doric pilasters.
