= Edwards Heights Historic District =

- U.S. National Register of Historic Places
- U.S. Historic district
- Hassman Heights
- Location within Oklahoma
- Location: Roughly NE. 16th Street, N. Page Avenue, NE. Success Street and N. Bryant Avenue, extension on NE. Grand Boulevard, Oklahoma City, Oklahoma, U.S.
- Coordinates: 35.488333°N 97.464444°W
- NRHP reference No.: 05001003
- Added to NRHP: September 7, 2005

Edwards Heights Historic District is a U.S. historic district and residential neighborhood in Oklahoma City, Oklahoma. It is approximately 4 miles east of downtown Oklahoma City and is roughly bounded by NE. 16th Street, N. Page Avenue, NE. Success Street and N. Bryant Avenue, extension on NE. Grand Boulevard. The Edward Heights Historic District was developed and subdivided specifically for African-Americans; and was founded in the 1930s and 1940s, at a time of racist residential deed restrictions in Oklahoma City.

It has been listed as one of the National Register of Historic Places (NRHP) since September 7, 2005.

== History ==
In 1936, African-American real estate developers Walter J. Edwards, and Frances Gilliam Edwards (née Waldrop) of the Edwards Real Estate Investment Company bought 32-acres of undeveloped land, then called Hassman Heights. They wanted to make it easier for African Americans to own property and arranged to change the property's racial deed restrictions from white to black residents, then built some 100 new houses. In 1946, they bought additional surrounding land and re-platted it as Edwards Heights. Until 1948, Oklahoma City included race-limiting covenants in residential deed restrictions. The history of Oklahoma City African-Americans is closely tied to this area of the city. Other later built large tract-house developments constructed specifically for African-Americans in Oklahoma City included Carverdale, Garden Oaks, and Day's Garden.

The Edwards Heights Historic District was developed in the late 1940s and early 1950s with primarily minimal ranch-style architecture; the NRPH listing includes parts of adjacent neighborhoods (such as Edwards Heights, Success Heights, McDonald Heights), with 318 properties total and 274 contributing properties. This was a modem subdivision designed specifically for middle-class Blacks in Oklahoma before and after World War II. Many people that worked at Tinker Air Force Base lived in the neighborhood. Architect Leon Quincy Jackson (1926/1927–1995) lived in the neighborhood and had designed his own house.

In the 1960s and 1970s, the neighborhood extended in size due to white flight in the surrounding neighborhoods.

== Architectural landmarks ==
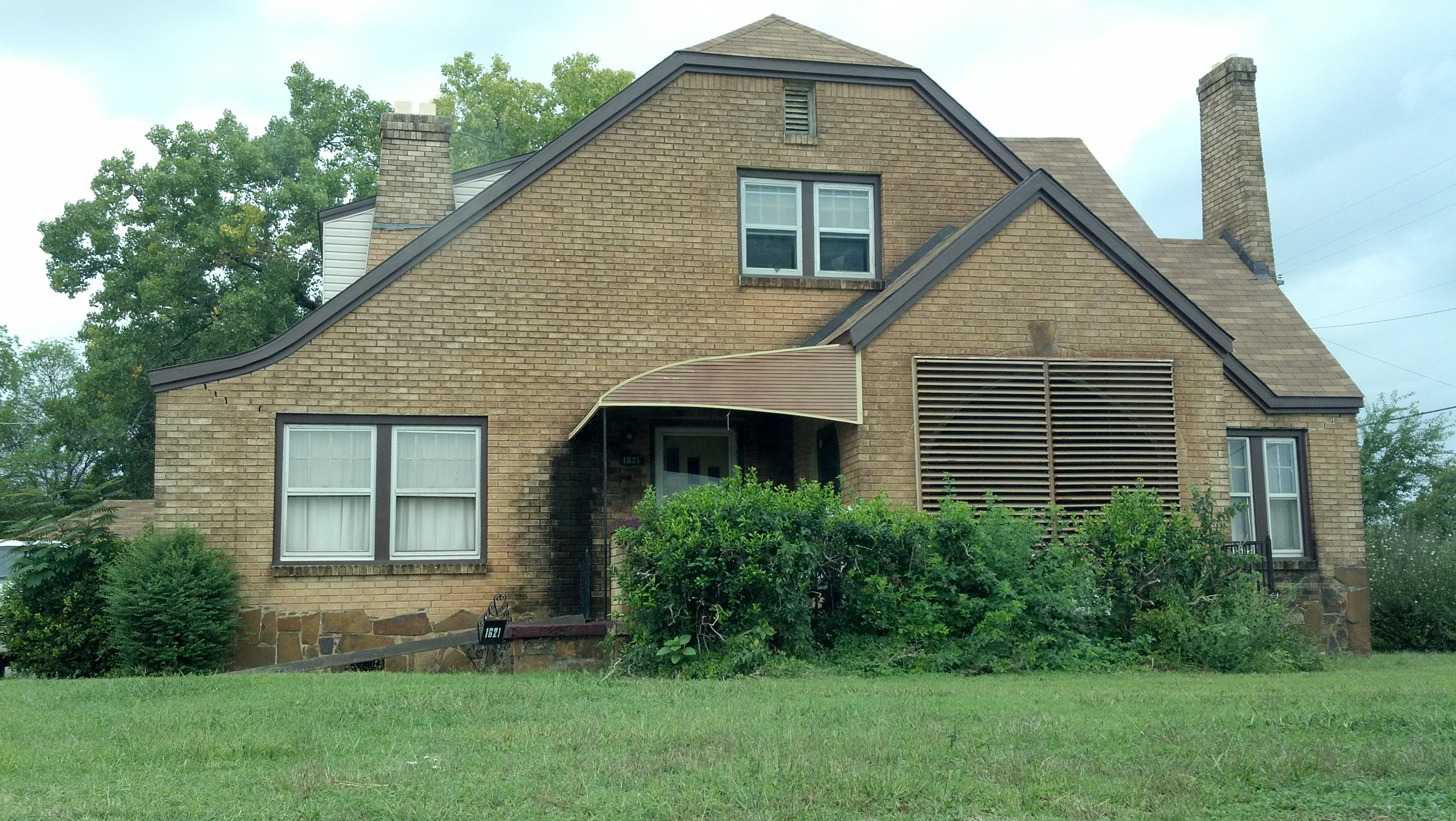
Walter J. and Frances W. Edwards House (c. 1941–1942)

- Walter J. and Frances W. Edwards House (c. 1941–1942), 1621 Northeast Grand Boulevard, Oklahoma City, Oklahoma; Tudor Revival-style single residency, which has its own NRHP listing
- The Edwards School (1942), Oklahoma City, Oklahoma; now demolished
- The Edwards Community Hospital (1947), Oklahoma City, Oklahoma; now demolished
- Redeemer Lutheran Church, 1524 Northeast Grand Boulevard, Oklahoma City, Oklahoma
- Jackson House, 2026 Northeast Grand Boulevard, Oklahoma City, Oklahoma; contemporary house designed by architect L. Quincey Jackson

== See also ==
- Eastside, Oklahoma City
- National Register of Historic Places listings in Oklahoma County, Oklahoma
- Medgar Evers Historic District in Jackson, Mississippi; a similar social history
