= Cheryl McKissack Daniel =

American civil engineer and businesswoman

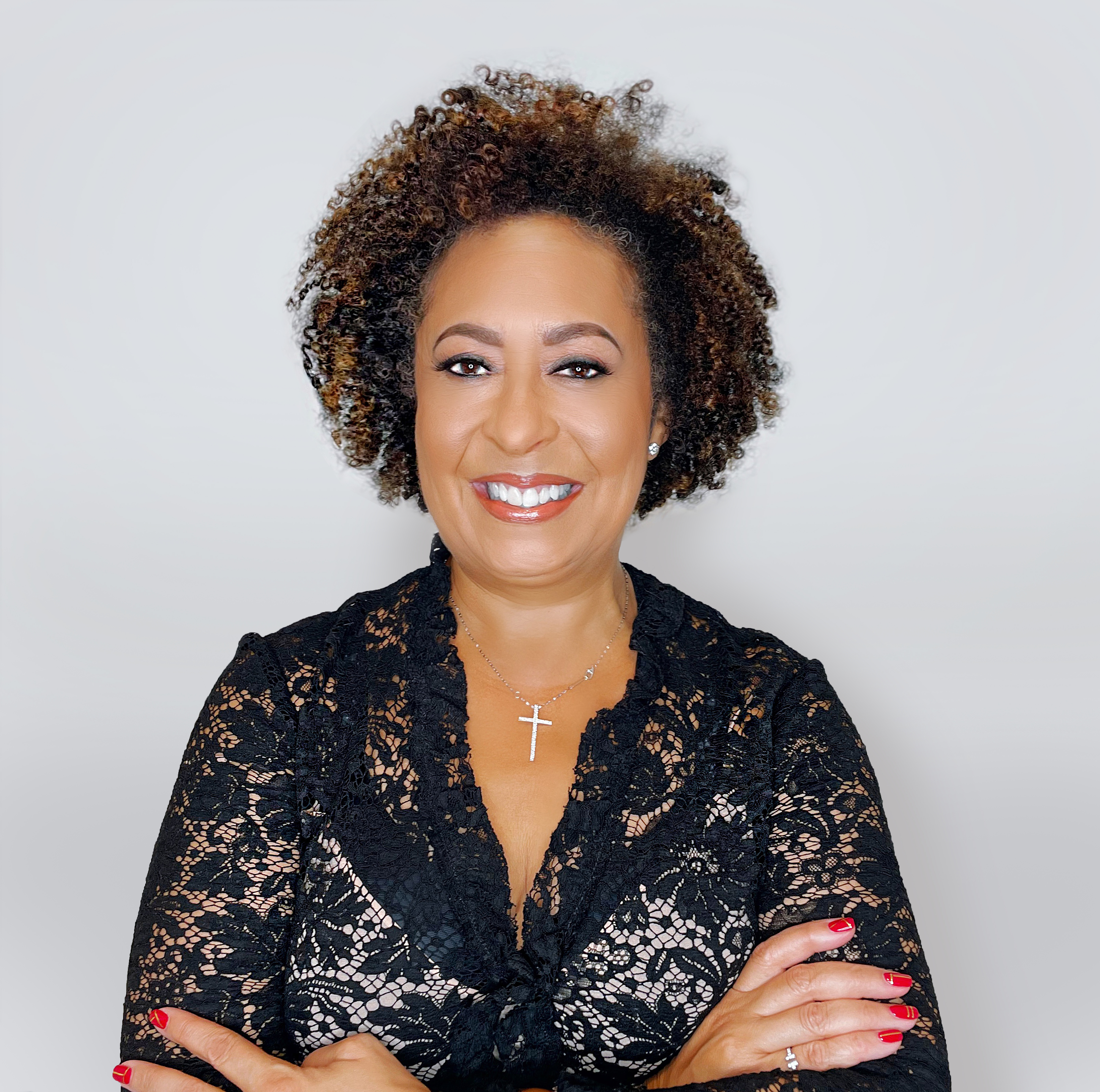
- McKissack Daniel in 2022
- Born: Cheryl McKissack; May 15, 1961 (age 65); Nashville, Tennessee, U.S.
- Other name: Cheryl McKissack Felder
- Education: Howard University
- Years active: 1985–present
- Parents: William DeBerry McKissack (father); Leatrice Buchanan McKissack (mother)
- Relatives: Moses McKissack III (grandfather); Calvin Lunsford McKissack (granduncle)

Cheryl McKissack Daniel (born May 15, 1961) is an American civil engineer and businesswoman. She is the president and chief executive officer of McKissack & McKissack, a design and construction company founded by her grandfather Moses McKissack III and granduncle Calvin Lunsford McKissack.

== Early life and education ==
Cheryl McKissack Daniel was born in 1961, in Nashville, Tennessee to parents Leatrice Buchanan McKissack and William DeBerry McKissack. She is the granddaughter of Moses McKissack III.

McKissack Daniel graduated from the University School of Nashville, then called the Peabody Demonstration School, in 1979. She went on to graduate from Howard University in 1983, earning a bachelor’s and a master's degree in civil engineering.

== Career ==
In 1985, McKissack Daniel moved to New York City to work as a civil engineer for Weidlinger Associates. She started her professional career working on Department of Defense projects. She was responsible for providing quality assurance, quality control, and government research for missile silos. She worked at Weidlinger until 1989 when she became a project estimator at Turner Construction.

In 1991, she began working for McKissack & McKissack while her mother, Leatrice McKissack, was CEO. McKissack Daniel helped open the firm's new office in New York City. McKissack Daniel also incorporated The McKissack Group, Inc in 1991. In 2000, McKissack Daniel purchased the company from her mother Leatrice, and became CEO and President. The move made her the company’s fifth-generation owner. In 2002, under her leadership, the company closed its office in Nashville, making New York City its headquarters. According to CBS News, by 2019, 61% of her hires had been minorities.

Since becoming CEO, McKissack Daniel has led construction projects, including John F. Kennedy International Airport New Terminal One, Barclays Center, Atlantic Yards Long Island Rail Road Vanderbilt Yard Relocation, Fulton Fish Market, Medgar Evers College, Studio Museum in Harlem,Harlem Hospital Center New Patient Pavilion, Coney Island Hospital Campus Renovation, and the Metropolitan Transportation Authority.

McKissack Daniel is also the founder of Legacy Engineers, a mechanical, electrical, plumbing, and fire protection engineering design firm focused on mentoring young professionals in the field.

She has served or serves on community, municipal, national, and professional advisory boards, and serves on the Board of Advisors of the Columbia University Center for Buildings, Infrastructure and Public Space (CBIPS).

In May 2022, McKissack Daniel received the Diversity and Inclusion lifetime achievement award from Crain's New York Business. In 2022, Ebony magazine gave McKissack Daniel the Black-Owned Business Award. She was honored by the National Liberty Museum as a "Hero of Liberty" for "her support of humanitarian initiatives and for promoting the responsibilities of a free and diverse America."
