= Sulphur Springs, Tennessee =

Unincorporated community in Tennessee, US

Coordinates: 36.348°N 82.542°W

Sulphur Springs is an unincorporated community in north central Washington County, Tennessee. Sulphur Springs is located on Tennessee State Route 75 southwest of Gray and northeast of Limestone.

== About ==
Sulphur Springs Elementary School serving grades kindergarten through 8th grade and is located in Sulphur Springs. The Capers C.M.E. Church was founded in 1832 as the McKendree African Mission, near Sulphur Springs.
