= Morris Memorial Building =

- U.S. National Register of Historic Places
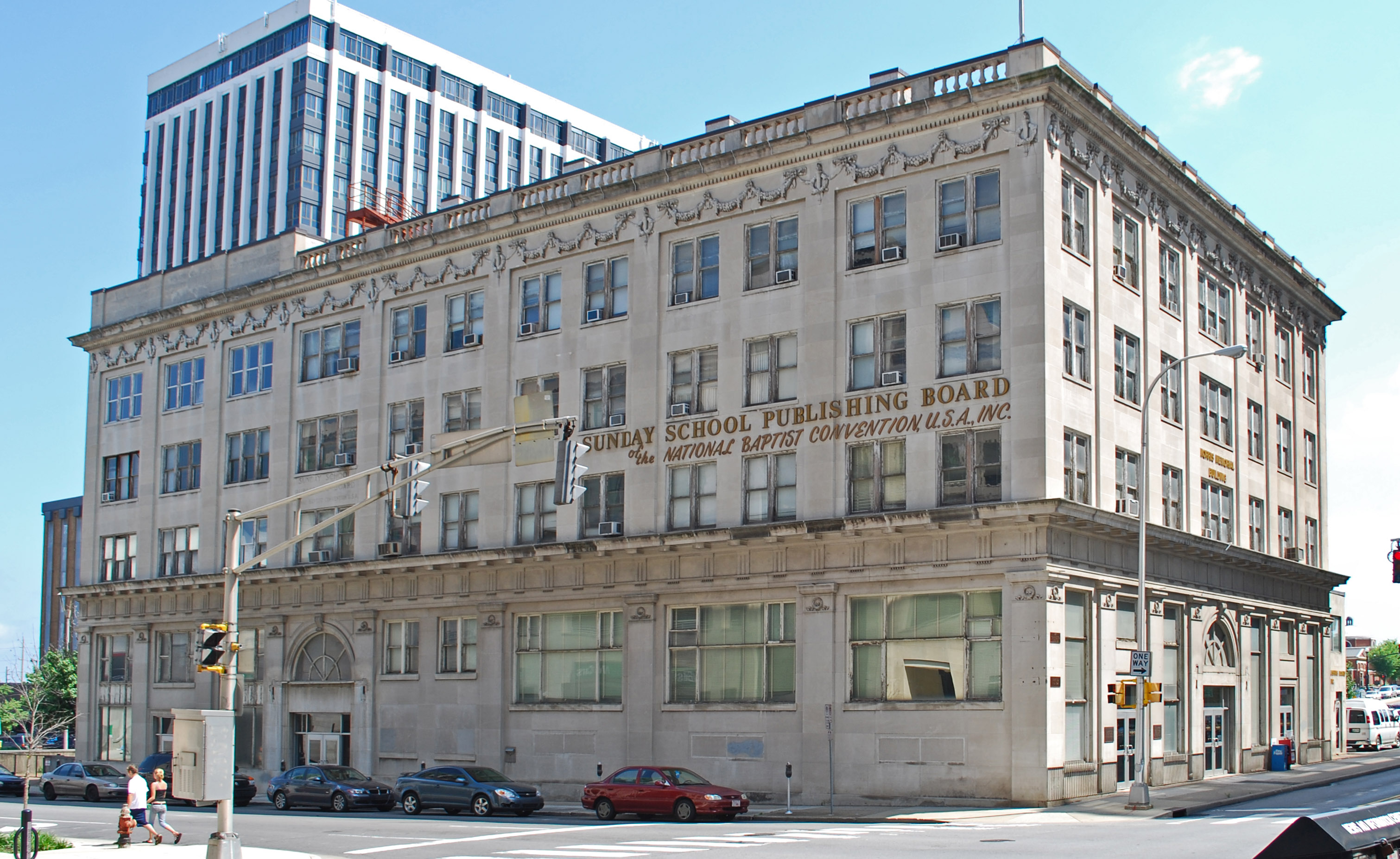
- The Morris Memorial Building in 2010

- Location within Tennessee
- Location: 330 Charlotte Avenue, Nashville, Tennessee, U.S.
- Coordinates: 36°10′01″N 86°46′49″W
- Built: 1924–1926
- Architect: McKissack & McKissack
- Architectural style: Neoclassical
- NRHP reference No.: 85000046
- Added to NRHP: January 2, 1985

The Morris Memorial Building is a historic building in Nashville, Tennessee, United States. It was built in the 1920s for the African-American National Baptist Convention, USA, Inc. and was named for longtime president Elias Camp Morris.

== Location ==
The building is located at 330 Charlotte Avenue in Nashville, the county seat of Davidson County, Tennessee. It used to be located at 33 Cedar St.

== History ==
Construction began in 1924, and it was completed in 1926. It was built for the National Baptist Convention, USA, Inc., an African-American Christian denomination, to house the Nashville offices of the denomination's Sunday School Publishing Board. The building was also home to African-American businesses.

By 2016, it was "the only building still standing that is originally associated with African-American businesses in the downtown core", according to The Tennessean.

It used to be the site of the Commercial Hotel, which was the site of slave agent offices in the 1850s.

== Architectural significance ==
The building was designed in the Neoclassical architectural style by the architectural firm McKissack & McKissack. It has been listed on the National Register of Historic Places since January 2, 1985.
