= Leon Quincy Jackson =

American architect and professor

- Born: January 9, 1927, or alternatively January 9, 1926; Wewoka, Oklahoma, U.S.
- Died: July 21, 1995; Nashville, Tennessee, U.S.
- Burial place: Greenwood Cemetery
- Other name: L. Quincy Jackson
- Education: Wilberforce University, Iowa State University; Kansas State University, University of Oklahoma
- Occupations: Architect, professor
- Movement: Modernism
- Children: 3

Leon Quincy Jackson (January 9, 1926, or 1927–July 21, 1995), was an American architect and professor. He was known for his modernist building designs. He is thought to be the first black architect in Oklahoma, however he faced discrimination and was not able to take the state licensing exam. His architecture firm was named L. Quincy Jackson & Associates.

== Early life and education ==
Leon Quincy Jackson was born on January 9 in either 1926 or 1927 in Wewoka, Oklahoma. He was raised by his mother Roxie Ann Jackson, a high school principal, and his stepfather Lonnie Galimore, a pharmacist. His mother was one-half Seminole and owned a large farm with oil reserves and a handful of active oil derricks.

He had studied at Wilberforce University and Iowa State University. Jackson received a B.A. degree in architecture (1950) from Kansas State University; and received a M.S. degree (1954) in planning from the University of Oklahoma (OU). Jackson was a student of Bruce Goff. He was the third black student to receive a master's degree in planning from OU.

== Career ==
In 1950, Jackson was the first African-American architect to open an office in the state of Oklahoma. He was hampered in taking his Oklahoma state licensing exam because of his race.

Before receiving his master's degree, Jackson taught architectural engineering at Prairie View A&M University. In 1954, Haile Selassie, the Emperor of Ethiopia, visited Oklahoma State University–Stillwater in Stillwater, Oklahoma, and Jackson attended the event.

In 1954, Jackson moved to Nashville. He taught at Tennessee State University (TSU) from 1954 until ?. He established the architectural engineering program at TSU. He was an influence on many students, including architect Bob Wesley.

From 1966 until 1975, Jackson was a member of the American Institute of Architects (AIA).

== Death and legacy ==
Jackson died on July 21, 1995, and was buried in the Greenwood Cemetery in Nashville. Some of his buildings have been lost to fire or demolition but others remain standing.

His daughter, Lillian Q. Jackson (born 1966) was employed by her father. She received a B.A. degree in Urban Studies with a focus on Urban Planning and Development from The University of Tennessee Knoxville.

His son, Leon Quincy Jackson, Jr. (1969–2016) worked as a promoter of electronic music in Nashville, Tennessee.

== List of buildings ==
- Jackson House, 2026 Northeast Grand Boulevard (c. 1950s), Edwards Heights Historic District, Oklahoma City, Oklahoma; his former home
- Pagoda of Medicine (1963), former Riverside Adventist Hospital campus (now the Seventh-Day Adventist Church), 707 Youngs Lane, Nashville, Tennessee; now demolished
- First Baptist Church, Capitol Hill (1972 remodel), Nashville, Tennessee
