= Fisk University Carnegie Library =

- Carnegie Library
- U.S. National Register of Historic Places
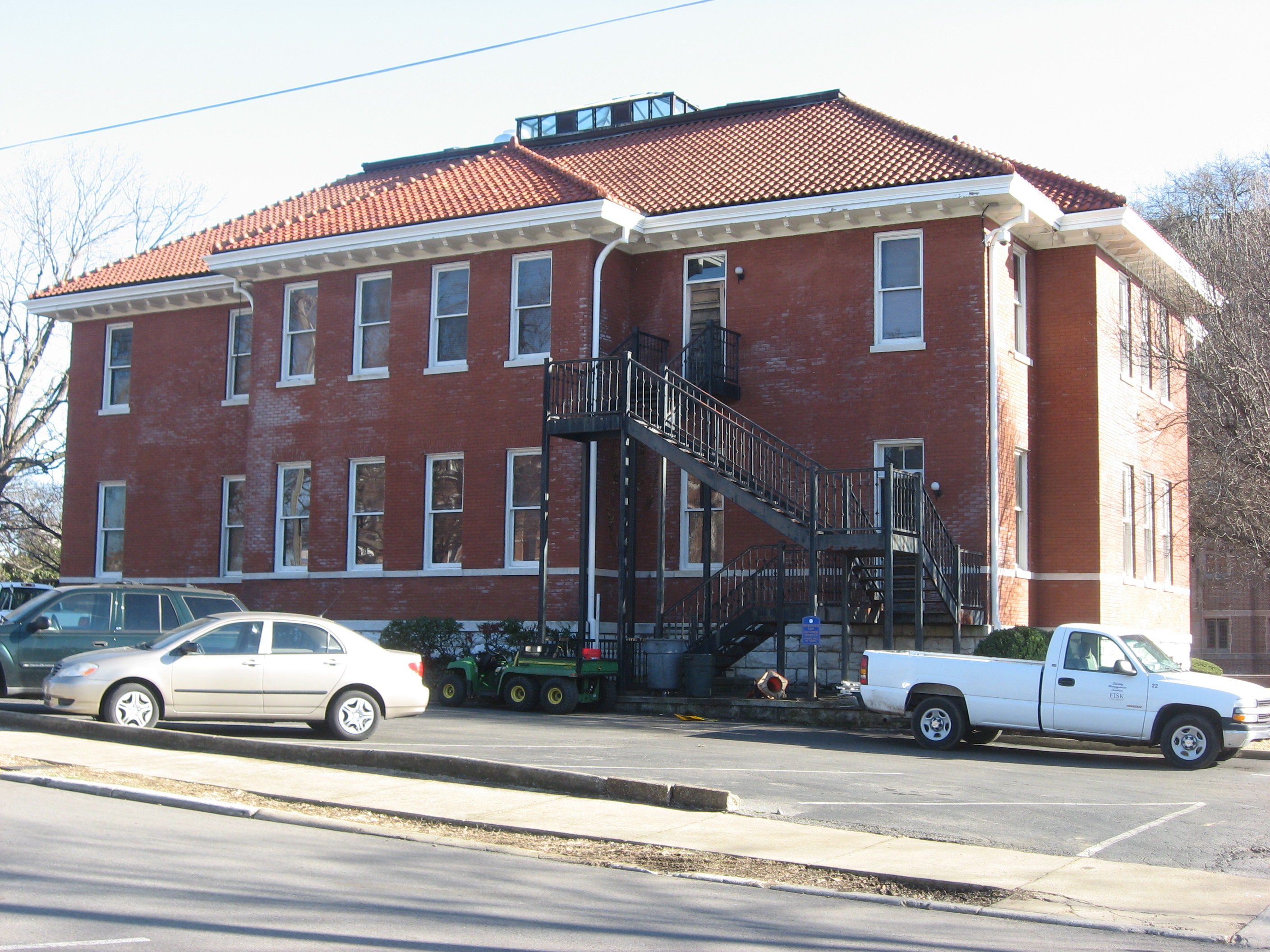
- Front and western side

- Location within Tennessee Location within the United States
- Location: Meharry Blvd. and 17th Ave. N., Fisk University campus, Nashville, Tennessee
- Coordinates: 36°10′5″N 86°48′18″W
- Area: 0.3 acres (0.12 ha)
- Built: 1908
- Architect: McKissack & McKissack
- Architectural style: Neoclassical
- MPS: McKissack and McKissack Buildings TR
- NRHP reference No.: 85003769
- Added to NRHP: January 2, 1985

The Carnegie Library is a historic building on the Fisk University campus in Nashville, Tennessee. The cornerstone was laid in 1908 by William Howard Taft, who was then the U.S. Secretary of War. It was funded by Andrew Carnegie, who provided a number of academic libraries, as well as many public Carnegie libraries.

The library was designed by African-American architect Moses McKissack III; it was his first major design project. It is a two-story Classical Revival building constructed from brick with a stone columned porch, featuring an interior light well. The upper floor was intended to provide a venue for musical performances.

It is included in the Fisk University Historic District and was independently listed on the National Register of Historic Places in 1985. It now serves as the university's Academic Building.
