= Eastside, Oklahoma City =

Coordinates: 35°29′55″N 97°29′20″W

The Eastside is a district in the U.S. state of Oklahoma. It is located roughly East of Interstate 235 and North of Interstate 40 in Oklahoma City. It is also where the state's Capitol Building is located. Additionally, it is where the state's largest medical complex, comprising OU Medicine, the VA Hospital, University of Oklahoma Health Sciences Center, Oklahoma Medical Research Foundation, Oklahoma State Department of Health, and many more public and private medical organizations is located.

It is considered one of Oklahoma City's oldest historically Black neighborhood.

== See also ==
- Edwards Heights Historic District
