= William Edmondson =

American sculptor

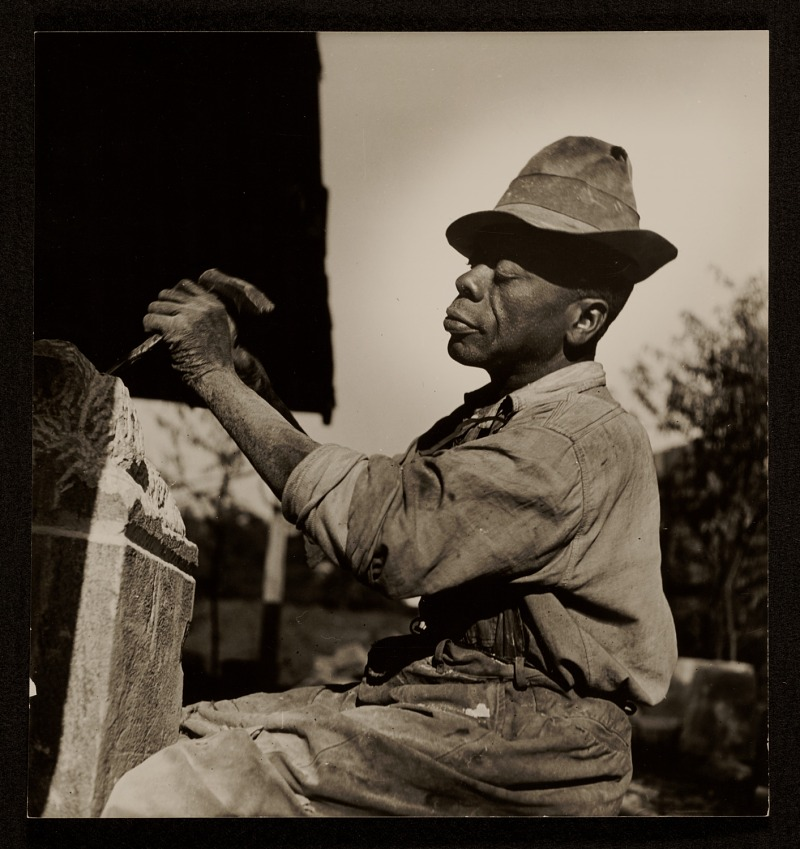
- William Edmondson sculpting in his backyard
- Born: William M. Edmondson; December 1874; Davidson County, Nashville, Tennessee
- Died: February 7, 1951 (aged 76); Nashville, Tennessee
- Occupation: Sculptor

William Edmondson (c. 1874–1951) was the first African-American artist to be given a one-person show at the Museum of Modern Art in New York City (1937).

== Biography ==
Edmondson was born sometime in December 1874 on the Compton Plantation in Davidson County, Tennessee. He did not know the date of his birth because of a fire that destroyed the family Bible. Edmondson was one of six children born to Orange and Jane Edmondson who had been previously enslaved before they worked as sharecroppers. Due to privilege regarding race and color, "mulattoes" on the plantation were given more respectable jobs, whereas the Edmonsons mainly worked in the corn fields and handled livestock. The Edmondson family worked on the plantation and earned 12 dollars a month. During these times in the corn fields he would see "angels in the clouds" and believed it was God talking to him. Edmondson had little or no formal education.

When his father died in late 1889, 16-year-old Edmondson refused to continue to work tirelessly on the plantation and relocated to Nashville. He got a good job working at the expansive new Nashville, Chattanooga and St. Louis Railroad shops. After an injury sustained at the Railway shops in 1907, Edmondson took a job as a custodian at the Nashville Women's Hospital, where he worked until the hospital closed in 1931. During this time, the Edmondson family officially resided in Nashville as his mother, Jane, was the last to leave the Compton Plantation. By age 39, his wages at Women's Hospital allowed him to buy a modest home and spacious lot in Edgehill, a segregated neighborhood in Nashville's Vanderbilt-Belmont area. Edmondson never married and he shared the home with his mother and sister, as well as, occasionally, other siblings, nieces, and nephews. With Jane's death in 1922, Edmonson's sister, Sarah, soon became the woman of the house. It was said she would often hold family barbecues that featured laughter and storytelling. When the hospital closed in 1931, Edmondson picked up work at various part-time jobs and in his leisure, he sculpted in his backyard and sold vegetables.

In 1948 Edmondson stopped sculpting. On February 7, 1951, at age seventy-six, he died quietly in his home in Nashville, Tennessee, where illness had confined him to bed for several months. As he was the last of his siblings to pass, his five nieces and seven nephews carried out his funeral service which was held the next day. Edmondson was buried in Mount Ararat Cemetery, now Greenwood Cemetery (Nashville, Tennessee), Nashville's oldest black cemetery. Today there is no sign of Edmondson's grave marker because at the time cheap wooden caskets were used to bury African Americans. As the wood decayed it would cause the grave markers to sink into the earth. Mt. Ararat burial records of the period were lost in a fire, so his exact grave site is unknown.

== Art career ==
Edmondson entered the world of sculpture at the advanced age of about 60 years old in 1934. He reported that he received a vision from God, who told him to start sculpting: "I was out in the driveway with some old sculptures of stone when I heard a voice telling me to pick up my tools and start to work on a tombstone. I looked up in the sky and right there in the noon daylight, he hung a tombstone out for me to make. I knowed it was God telling me what to do." He carved tombstones primarily from chunks of discarded limestone from demolished buildings, which were delivered to him by wrecking companies' trucks. A signature Edmondson tombstone reflects strong large lettering carved in the stone. He began his career by working on these tombstones, which he sold or gave to friends and family in the community. Soon he began carving lawn ornaments, birdbaths, and decorative sculptures. In his yard hung a sign "Tomb-Stones. For Sale. Garden. Ornaments. Stone Work W M Edmondson."

Edmondson's work was influenced by his Christian faith and his membership in a nearby Primitive Baptist congregation. His sculptures are straightforward and emphatic forms ranging from one to three feet in height, many sharing his unique religious symbolism. He carved figures of biblical characters, angels, doves, turtles, eagles, rabbits, horses and other real and fanciful creatures. His sculpture Noah's Ark stood tall in the middle of his backyard. It consists for four differently carved tiers of limestone and is the only architectural work that existed in his collection. He carved local community icons such as preachers, lawyers and school teachers, celebrities of the day who were important to the African American community, such as prizefighter Jack Johnson. He also sculpted a number of popular figures such as First Lady Eleanor Roosevelt. Edmondson also created a small number of nude figures. Most of Edmonson's carved figures have faces carved on a spherical base, with a small mouth resting directly under a vertical nose, following to connect to the curve of the brow. Sometimes he would decide not to carve the eyebrows and would opt to make the nose broader. It is believed he did this to achieve racial inclusion within his collection of artwork. Even with the versatility of his artwork, the common characteristic of an Edmondson sculpture was the overbuilt-ness of the figures carved within or from the limestone. Intentional texturing ranging between smooth, chiseled, polished or rough was present throughout each sculpture. The facial technique, overbuilt-ness, and range in texturing can be observed in Edmonson's most well-known masterpiece Bess and Joe and further with Mary and Martha.

Edmondson had a large audience in Edgehill as many of his figures were on display not only in his yard, but in that of neighbors' homes and gardens. A few years into Edmondson's sculpting career, Peabody College art enthusiast Sidney Hirsch wandered through Edgehill and came upon Edmondson's vast sculpture collection. This is widely documented as Edmondson's "discovery" by Sidney Mttron Hirsch. Hirsch himself was a collector of African, Middle Eastern, and East Asian art and became one of Edmondson's greatest supporters. With this exposure, friends of Hirsch's and other fellow members of Nashville's elite bought Edmondson's sculptures for their homes, gardens, and offices, many of which were later displayed in exhibits at the Smithsonian American Art Museum and the Cheekwood Botanical Garden and Museum of Art. Of Hirsch's friends, Alfred and Elizabeth Starr, Alfred, a managing partner of a chain of movie theaters catering to the black community, and his wife Elizabeth, a painter, also became enthusiastic patrons and supporters of Edmondson's work. They introduced Edmondson to several artist friends, including Starr's boyhood friend Meyer (Mike) Wolfe and his wife Louise Dahl-Wolfe. Dahl-Wolfe was a photographer who had recently begun work for Harper's Bazaar fashion magazine in New York. She made over a hundred photographs of Edmondson's at work in his backyard shop, which she presented to the editor of Harper's Bazaar. She attempted to publish his work but newspaper chain mogul William Randolph Hearst had a prejudice against showing Negro art as he saw them as nothing other than servants. She then brought Edmondson's work to the attention of fellow Tennessean Thomas Mabry and his boss Alfred Barr, the director of the Museum of Modern Art (MoMA).

Edmondson's career lasted for about fifteen years. His work never commanded large sums during his lifetime. In 1939 and again in 1941, he worked under the Works Progress Administration, a government-sponsored relief program that included artists. In the late 1940s, his health began to fail and his artistic production slowed. Edmondson professed to be uninterested in fame, and he appears to have struggled financially during the final years of his life. He is believed to have created about 300 works during his working lifetime.

== Exhibitions ==
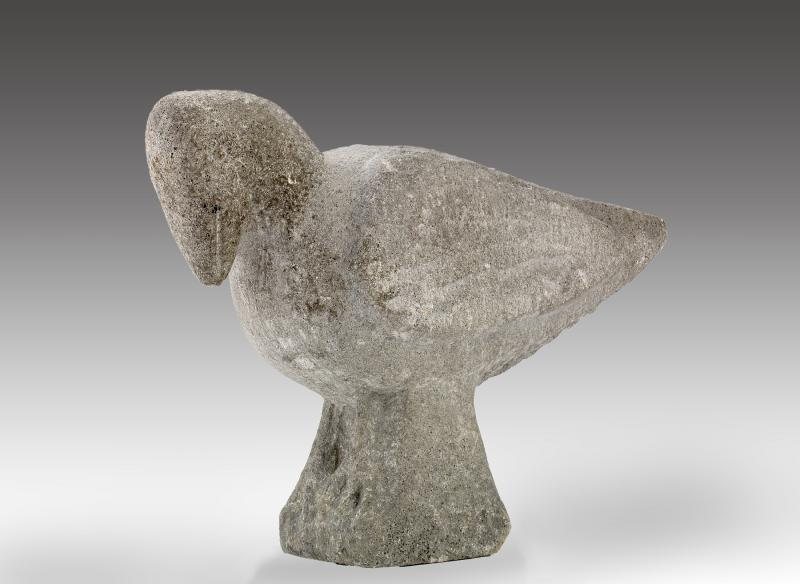
Bird ca. 1937, carved limestone, gift from Margaret Z. Robson

Edmondson was given a one-man show of 12 sculptures, the first by an African American artist to be presented by Museum of Modern Art from October 20 to December 1, 1937 in a temporary alcove space the Museum had at Rockefeller Center. MoMA would categorize Edmonson's work as "modern primitive". In 1938, through MoMA's influence, William Edmondson's sculpture was included in the "Three Centuries of Art in the United States" in Paris. Interest in his work on the national and international stage was short-lived, and he was viewed primarily as a novelty, or exemplar of the "primitive" race-memory of an untutored, naive old Negro stone carver. Locally, Alfred Starr continued to promote Edmondson's work to his artistic friends and acquaintances, who bought work directly from Edmondson's "sculpture yard" or through the local Lyzon Gallery. Starr introduced the famed modernist photographer Edward Weston to Edmondson in 1941, and Weston made several striking photographs of Edmondson at work in his shop and yard. Also in 1941, he received the only other solo show accorded during his lifetime, at the Nashville Art Gallery.

After very sporadic exhibition through the 1950s and 1960s (mostly as part of "folk art" exhibits), collector Edmund Fuller wrote a biography of Edmondson which was published in 1973. His sculpture was included in the influential "Two Centuries of Black American Art" exhibition curated by Fisk University Art Department chairman David Driskell in 1976. In 1981 the new Tennessee State Museum opened with a permanent solo exhibition with six of Edmondson's sculptures featuring loaned sculptures from Elizabeth Starr's personal collection, and the essays in the accompanying catalog sought to elevate appreciation of Edmondson's work as fine art. Through the 1980s and 1990s Edmondson's sculptures were exhibited extensively, though often in the limiting context of the labels "outsider", "folk art", "self-taught", and "naive".

In 1999, Nashville's Cheekwood Museum of Art mounted a major traveling retrospective exhibition and catalog that included in-depth biographical and critical essays on his life and work. This exhibit included donated sculptures from the personal collections of the Fletcher, Formosa, and Overton families. A 2006 exhibition, "William Edmondson, Bill Traylor, and the Modernist Impulse", paired Edmondson with another well-known self-taught artist and argued for Edmondson's acceptance as an artist without limiting labels. This exhibit displayed twenty-one of Edmondson's sculptures which is the largest collection of Edmondson's art in the country. In 2016 the Smithsonian American Art Museum received one of its largest gifts of folk art work from Margaret Z. Robson, among them were three of Edmondson's sculptures.

Edmondson's art is displayed permanently at the Newark Museum of Art, American Folk Art Museum, the Hirshhorn Museum and Sculpture Garden, the Philadelphia Museum of Art, the Abby Aldrich Rockefeller Folk Art Museum, the Smithsonian American Art Museum and the Montclair Museum in New Jersey.

== Legacy ==
On August 20, 2014, Mayor Karl Dean opened Nashville's first arts park, named in Edmondson's honor. The park, managed by the Nashville Metropolitan Development and Housing Agency, includes sculptures by Thornton Dial and Lonnie Holley inspired by the work of William Edmondson. The park is located in a traditionally African-American neighborhood. Even though the site of Edmondson's house at 1434 Fourteenth Avenue South is now a public school, it has been officially recognized with a Tennessee historical marker. About a few miles away, some of Edmondson's tombstones are on display at a local cemetery.

Since his death, Edmondson's work has gradually come to be highly appreciated by critics and collectors, and his sculptures garner up to $70,000-$300,000 at auction. In January 2016, "A Boxer" sold at a private auction for $785,000 the highest price ever paid for an Edmondson work.

== Selected recent exhibitions ==
- Cheekwood Museum of Art, Nashville, TN
  - The Art of William Edmondson 1999 organized with the American Folk Art Museum, New York, NY
  - William Edmondson and Friends: Breaking the Mold, 2014
  - Visions from Above: The Life and Work of William Edmondson, 2017

== Collections with Edmondson works ==
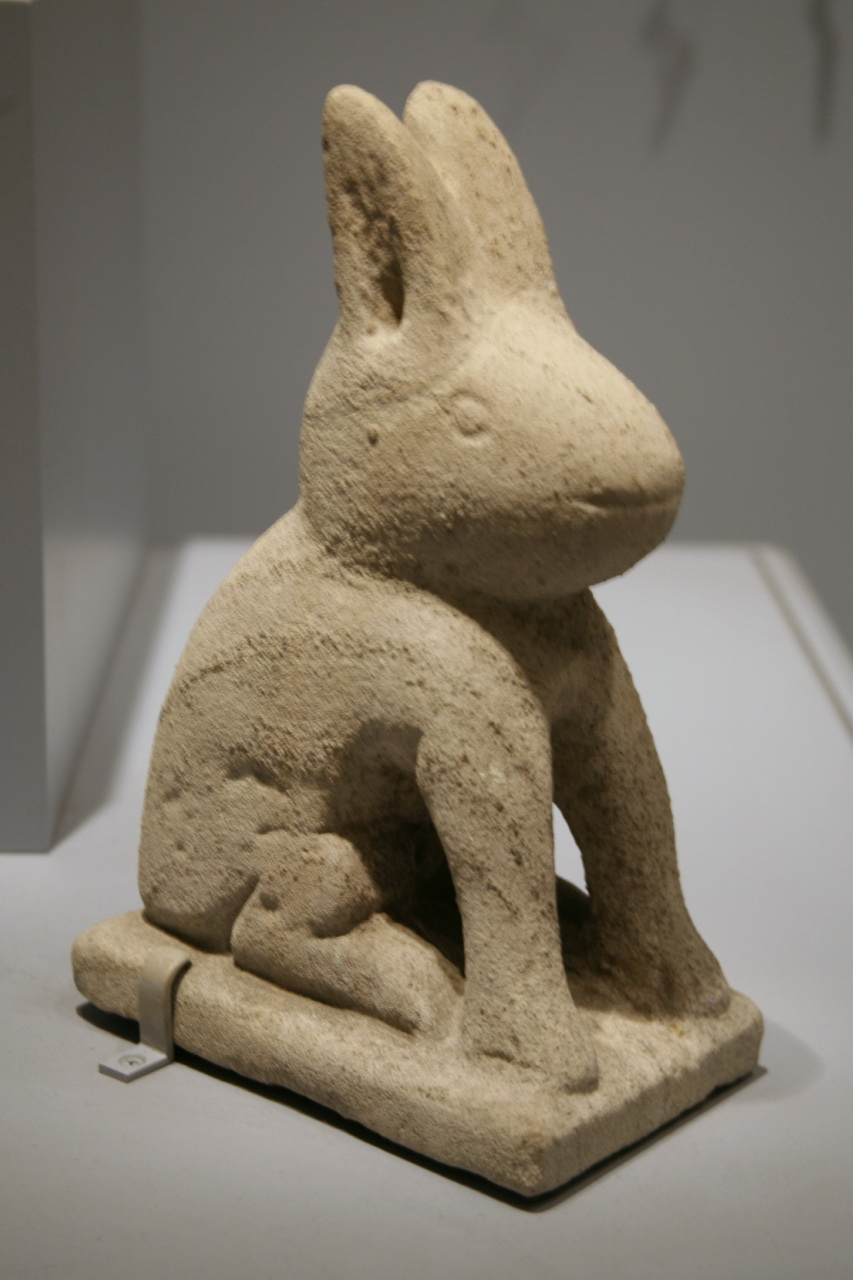
Rabbit (ca. 1940) at the Smithsonian

- American Folk Art Museum, New York, NY
- Minneapolis Institute of Art, Minneapolis, MN
- The National Gallery of Art, Washington, DC
- Smithsonian Museum of American Art, Washington, DC
- Tennessee State Library, Nashville, TN
- The Tennessee State Museum, Nashville, TN
- Cheekwood Museum of Art, Nashville, TN has the largest collection of William Edmondson sculptures.

== Sources ==
- Edmondson, William; Thompson, Robert Farris; Freeman, Rusty (1999). The Art of William Edmondson. Univ. Press of Mississippi. ISBN 9781578061815.
- The WPA Guide to Tennessee, Compiled and Written by the Federal Writers' Project of the Works Projects Administration for the State of Tennessee, The University of Tennessee Press, Knoxville, 1986
- Outsider Art Sourcebook, ed. John Maizels, Raw Vision, Watford, 2009
