= First Baptist Church, Capitol Hill =

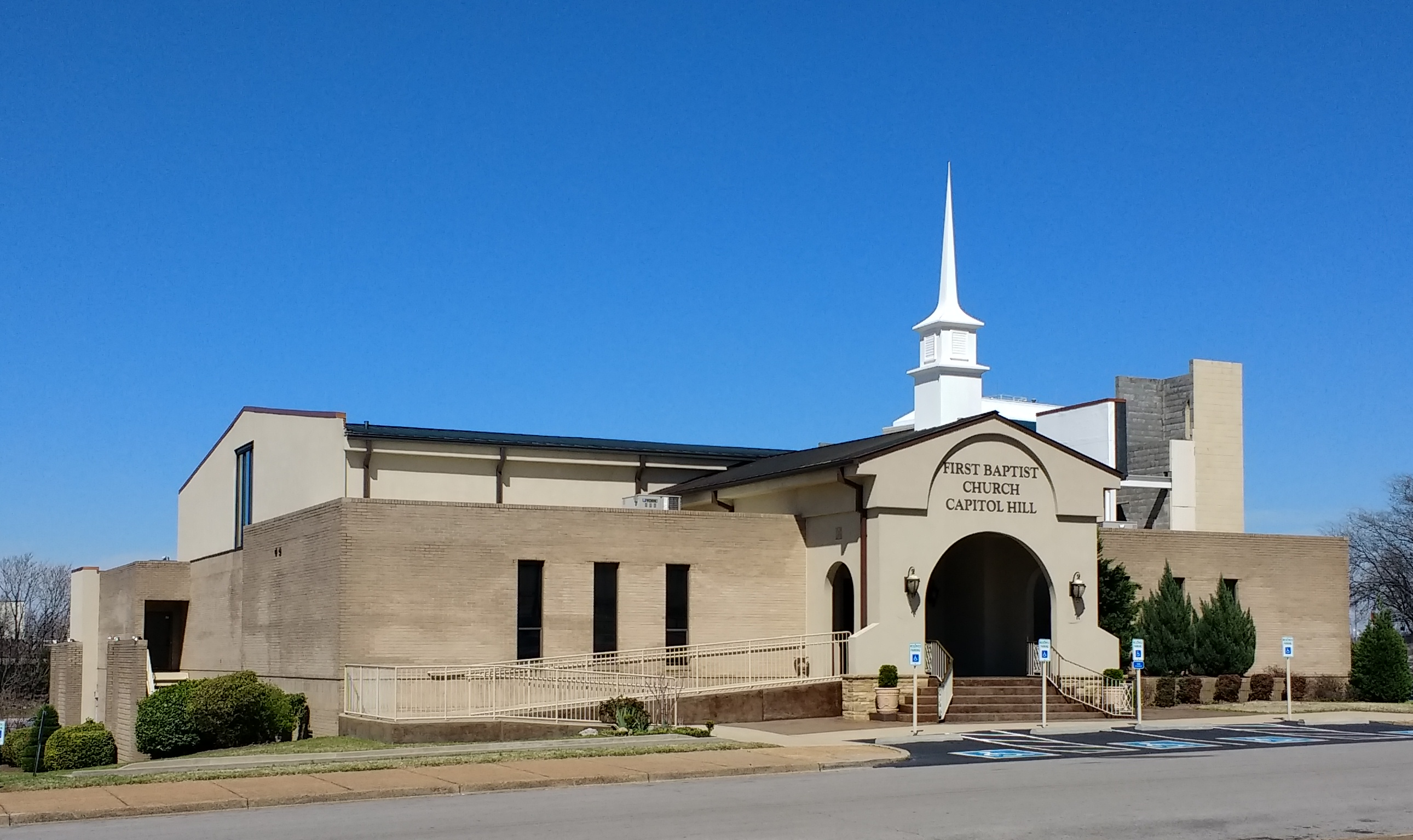

- Location within Tennessee Location within the United States
- 36°09′54.832″N 86°47′15.273″W
- Location: Nashville, Tennessee

Site notes
- Architect: L. Quincy Jackson (1972 remodel)

The First Baptist Church, Capitol Hill is a Baptist church in Nashville, Tennessee. During the Civil Rights Era, many sit-in participants were trained in non-violent civil disobedience there. Formerly known as the First Colored Baptist Church.

== History ==
In 1848, the African American congregation in First Baptist Church on Broadway requested separate space for worship. This faction was named the First Colored Baptist Mission. In 1865, the First Colored Baptist Mission sought to become its own independent entity from the First Baptist Church congregation. Thus the First Colored Baptist Mission formally became known as the First Colored Baptist Church, Nashville, Tennessee. Thirty years later, another division occurred and the church split into Spruce Street Baptist Church, who would meet on North Spruce Street in East Nashville, and First Colored Baptist Church, who would meet on 8th Avenue North. In 1969, the First Colored Baptist Church renamed themselves as the First Baptist Church, Capitol Hill.

== Civil Rights Movement ==
James Lawson began doing workshops about non-violent civil protest there in 1958. Kelly Miller Smith was pastor. Smith had previously help found Southern Christian Leadership Conference (SCLC). Many prominent Nashville activists participated in Lawson's classes: Diane Nash, Bernard Lafayette, James Bevel, and John Lewis.

== See also ==
- Nelson Merry College (1890–1965), historically segregated African American school
