= Nelson Merry College =

American Black college (1890–1965)

- Former names: Nelson Merry Academy, Nelson Mary College, Nelson Merry High School; Nelson Merry Training College, Nelson Merry Teachers' College
- Type: Private
- Active: c. 1890–1965
- Founder: Rev. Peter Guinn
- Religious affiliation: Baptist
- Location: Mossy Creek (now Jefferson City), Tennessee, U.S.
- Mascots: Lions; Black Cats

Nelson Merry College was an American private Baptist black K–12 school (and later high school) in operation from c. 1890 to 1965, and located in Mossy Creek (now Jefferson City) in Tennessee, U.S. It has a historical marker where it once stood, erected by Cultural Resource Analysts. The school went by many other names, including Nelson Merry Training College, Nelson Merry Academy, Nelson Mary College, and Nelson Merry High School.

== History ==
The school was chartered on January 3, 1889 in the state of Tennessee. The funds to build the school were raised by Rev. Peter Guinn of the Martha Davis Baptist Church in Jefferson City, Tennessee. It was named after Rev. Nelson G. Merry, who was born enslaved in Tennessee, and went on to form the First Colored Baptist Church in Nashville. Former principals of Nelson Merry included the founding principal, G. Nelson Bowen; and Eugene E. Peck. Nelson Merry was essentially a K–12 school until at least to World War I. The school mascot was the lions, but they also used the name the "Black Cats" for the baseball team in the 1920s.

After Brown v. Board of Education, the Jefferson County, Tennessee schools racially integrated and in 1965 the Nelson Merry College was closed.
