= Cameron School =

- U.S. National Register of Historic Places
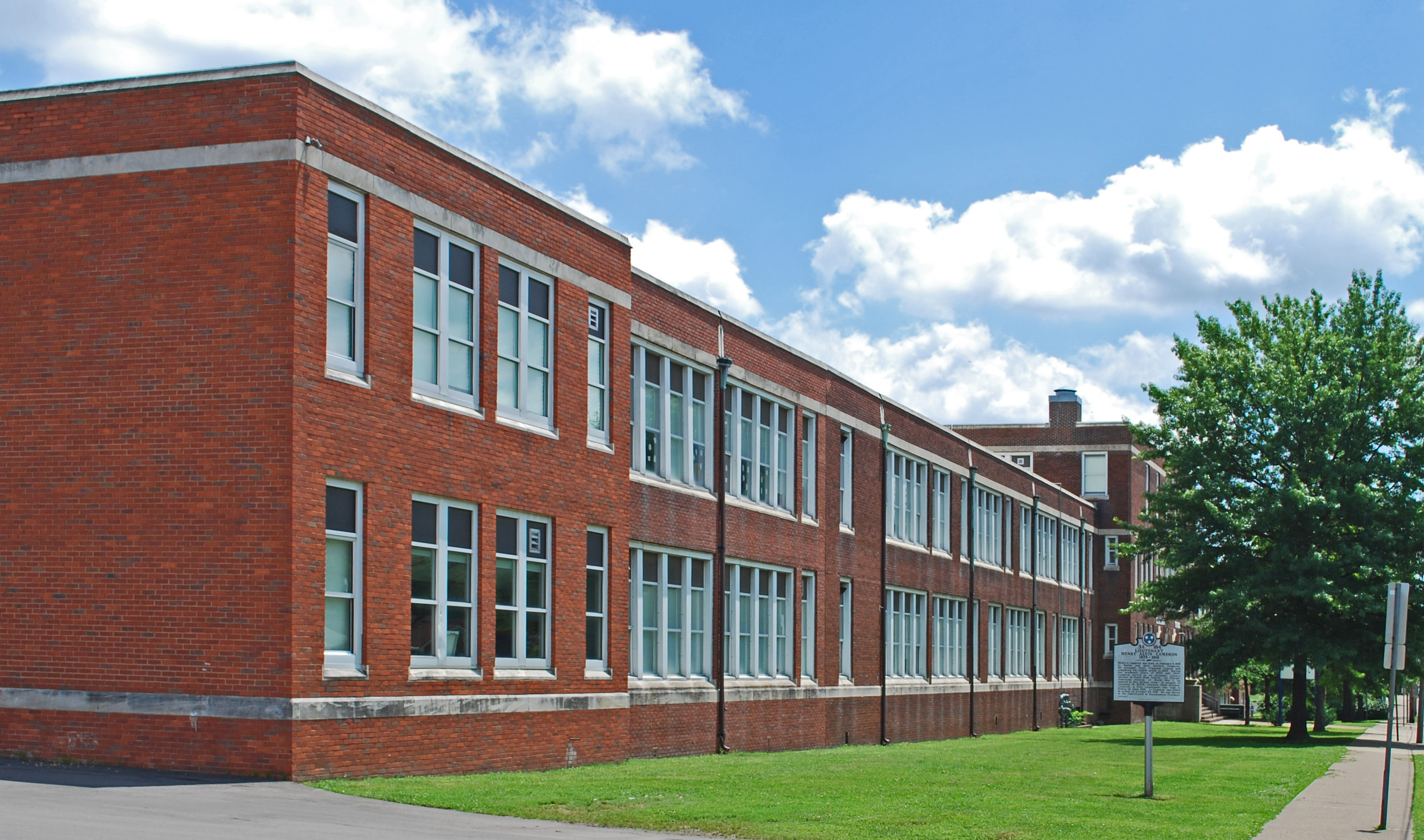
- The Cameron School in 2010

- Location within Tennessee Location within the United States
- Location: 1034 First Avenue South, Nashville, Tennessee, U.S.
- Coordinates: 36°08′55″N 86°45′51″W
- Built: 1939-1940
- Architect: Henry C. Hibbs
- Architectural style: Gothic Revival
- NRHP reference No.: 05000180
- Added to NRHP: March 15, 2005

The Cameron School is a historic school building in Nashville, Tennessee, United States. A school for African American students, it closed after desegregation in 1971.

Built as a project of the Public Works Administration, construction began in 1939 and was completed in 1940. It was designed by architect Henry C. Hibbs in the Gothic Revival architectural style. It was named in honor of Henry Alvin Cameron, a science teacher and World War I casualty. It has been listed on the National Register of Historic Places since March 15, 2005.

== See also ==
- Pearl High School, predecessor of Pearl-Cohn Comprehensive High School and Martin Luther King Magnet at Pearl High School in Nashville
