= Martin Luther King Magnet at Pearl High School =

Martin Luther King Magnet
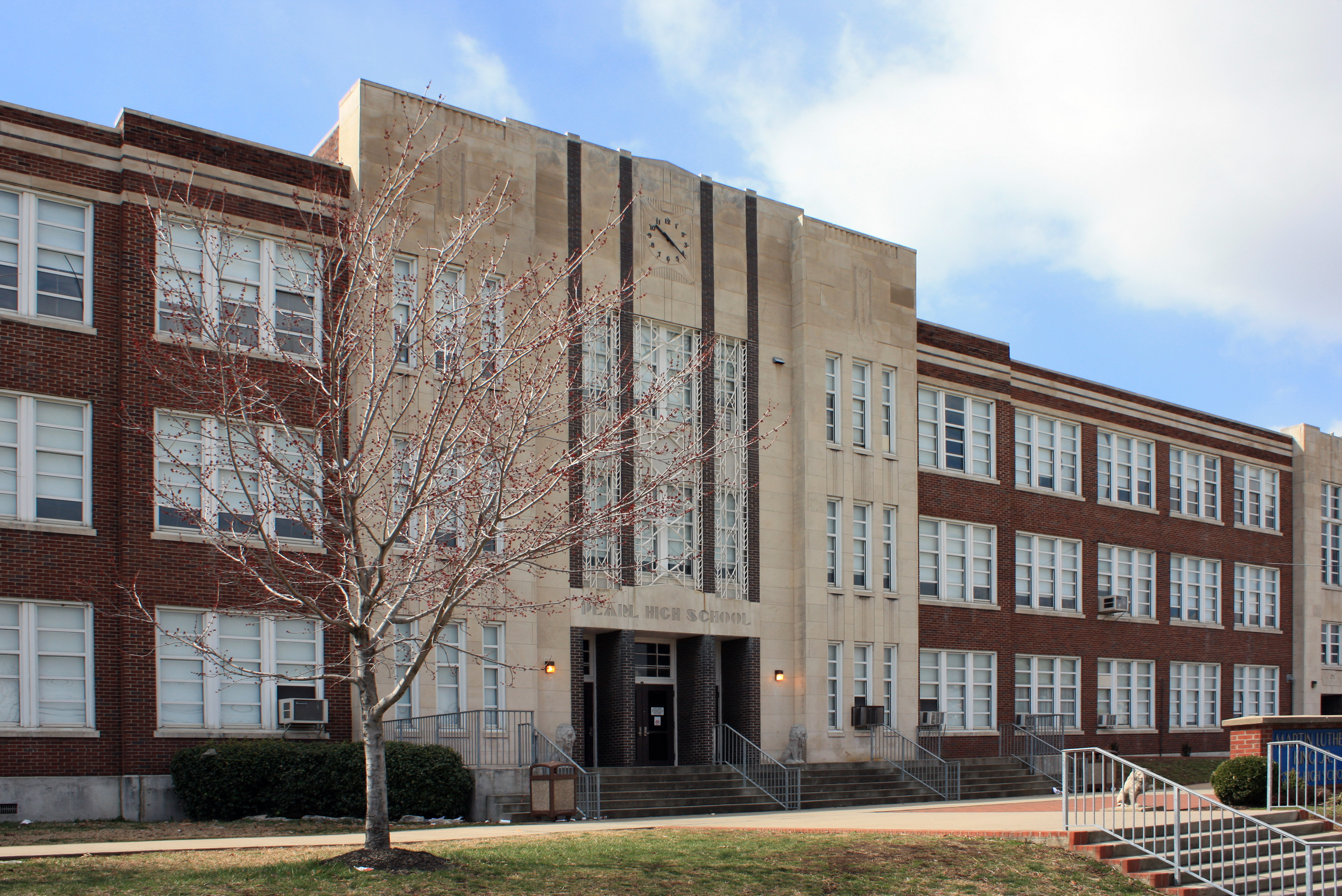

Location
- 613 17th Avenue North; Nashville, Tennessee; United States; 36.1617°N 86.8006°W

Information
- Type: Magnet High School
- Motto: "Excellence is our hallmark."
- Established: 1986
- Principal: Angela McShepard-Ray
- Grades: 8–12
- Enrollment: 1,219 (2023-2024)
- Colors: Royal blue and white
- Mascot: Royals
- Newspaper: The Royal Banner
- Yearbook: King Chronicle
- Website: mlk.mnps.org
- Pearl High School
- U.S. National Register of Historic Places
- Built: 1937
- Architect: McKissack & McKissack
- Architectural style: Art Deco
- NRHP reference No.: 02000828
- Added to NRHP: October 15, 1966

Martin Luther King Jr. Academic Magnet for Health Sciences and Engineering at Pearl High School (or simply MLK Magnet) is a public magnet high school located in Nashville, Tennessee. MLK includes grades 8–12, and students enter through a lottery process similar to the other magnet schools in Nashville. The school's building was home to Pearl High School, established for African American students in Nashville. The building is listed on the National Register of Historic Places.

== History ==
Pearl High School was a school for African American students. Franklin Gatewood Smith served as its principal. It was desegregated in 1971. It merged with another school to form Pearl-Cohn Comprehensive High School.

The original Pearl High School building, built in 1937 to house an African-American school, was commissioned in 1936 by the Public Works Administration (PWA) and was designed by McKissack and McKissack, a prominent African-American architectural firm. The building features a red brick veneer and Art Deco stylistic elements, in an architectural style commonly used by the PWA and known as PWA Moderne. The building was expanded in 1945 and 1963, again with designs by McKissack and McKissack.

The school was Nashville's first secondary magnet for grades 7-12. After Pearl High moved numerous times, settling at 17th Avenue in the 1950s and eventually to its current location at Pearl Cohn Comprehensive High School, MLK Magnet, originally named Martin Luther King, Jr. Magnet High School for the Health Sciences and Engineering, opened its doors in August 1986 at the former Pearl High with only grades 7–9, adding one grade per year until 1990 when it had its first graduating class of 25 students. A gymnasium was added to the building in 1995, designed by the Nashville architectural firm of Street, Dixon, Rick. The school's current name was adopted in 2001. The building is listed on the National Register of Historic Places.

In 2023, it was announced that between 2024 and 2028, MLK would transition from a 7-12 to a 9-12 model. The middle school curriculum available at MLK would instead be introduced at Head Magnet Middle School. The last 7th grade class at MLK attended during the 2025-2026 school year.

== Student body ==
MLK possesses one of the most diverse student bodies in Nashville, with a majority enrollment of 55% and an enrollment of economically disadvantaged students of 19%. Over time, the faculty and student populations have diversified, along with the changing demographics of Nashville.

== Distinctions ==
MLK is known for its academic program, focusing on math, science, and engineering. The school also has art, foreign language, band, and orchestra programs. This academic magnet school only offers courses in Honors and Advanced Placement (AP) with the exception of physical education, certain engineering, and critical thinking courses. In addition, MLK offers the Practica program as well as advanced and dual enrollment courses along with a partnership with the School for Science and Math at Vanderbilt University.

In the 2007–2008 academic year MLK received the Siemens Award for Advanced Placement, for one of the best scientific and math-based academic programs in the country. The school also has a renowned quiz bowl team - in 2007–2009, the school placed first at state competitions, second at the PACE national tournament in 2007, 13th at NAQT Nationals in 2007, and 7th at NAQT Nationals in 2008. In addition, the MLK Magnet Mock Trial team reached the State competition in 2009 and 2011. They placed 7th in 2011 and took home Best Advocate for the Defense, Best Defense Witness.

MLK Magnet is ranked in the top 113 of Newsweek's and top 83 in U.S. News & World Report's annual rankings of the top public high schools in America and 2nd overall in Tennessee.

First Lady Michelle Obama gave the commencement speech for Martin Luther King Jr. Magnet School's graduation in 2013.

== Enrollment ==
Students who want to go to MLK must have the academic requirements of 85 or above in all courses of the 1st semester. They must also receive "On track" or "Mastered" in their TN Ready Test of the previous year or current year. They can also qualify if they have good map scores in May (with grades) Head middle and Rose Park have a direct pathway to MLK if requirements are met. Students can also enter a lottery if they do not have a pathway to MLK. (requirements must be meet as well to enter lottery)

	2012	2011	2010	2009	2008	2007
Newsweek Top Public High Schools	90 (2)		56 (2)	30 (2)	23 (1)	56 (1)
U.S. News & World Report Best High Schools	80 (2)	30 (2)	30 (2)	30 (2)	41 (2)	32 (1)
U.S. News & World Report Best High Schools for Math and Science	36 (1)	36 (1)				

(School's rank within Tennessee given in parentheses)

== Sports ==
MLK offers a variety of sports and competes regularly, as shown by numerous awards and rankings. MLK has also won 50 (25 Team and 25 individual) TSSAA championship titles.

MLK MAGNET OFFERED HIGH SCHOOL SPORTS
Sport	Coach(es)	TSSAA Division	TSSAA Championship History
Baseball	Chase Wood, Paul Neil	Division I, Class 3A, Region 5, District 10	N/A
Boys’ Basketball	Caden Anderson, Paul Neil, Joseph Walker	Division I, Class 3A, Region 5, District 10	8 Appearances (2023, 2005, 2004, 2001, 2000, 1997, 1996, 1991), 2 Team Champion titles (1996, 1991)
Girls’ Basketball	Melvin McCullogh, Mykeia McCullogh	Division I, Class 3A, Region 5, District 10	2 Appearances (2015, 2014), 1 Team Championship title (2015)
Bowling	Brian Stewart	Division I, Region 5, District 9	10 Individual Appearances (2007, 2008, 2009, 2010, 2011, 2012, 2013, 2015, 2019, 2024)
Girls’ Bowling	Ron Moseley	Division I, Region 5, District 9	11 Individual Appearances (2007, 2008, 2009, 2010, 2013, 2014, 2015, 2020, 2022, 2023, 2025)
Cheerleading	Nikki Boleyjack	N/A	N/A
Boys’ Cross Country	Michael Gabrys	Division I, Class AA, Section 4	19 Team Appearances (1994, 2002, 2004, 2005, 2006, 2007, 2008, 2009, 2010, 2012, 2013, 2014, 2015, 2016, 2017, 2021, 2023, 2024, 2025), 3 Team Runner-up titles (2024, 2012, 2007), 4 Team Championship titles (2025, 2010, 2009, 2008), 27 Individual Appearances (1994, 2001, 2002, 2003, 2004, 2005, 2006, 2007, 2008, 2009, 2010, 2011, 2012, 2013, 2014, 2015, 2016, 2017, 2017, 2018, 2019, 2020, 2021, 2022, 2023, 2024, 2025) 3 Individual Runner-up titles (2025, 2009, 2002), 2 Individual Champion titles (2012, 2011)
Girls’ Cross Country	Hollee Ally, Brandon Ally	Division I, Class AA, Section 4	13 Team Appearances (2001, 2002, 2004, 2005, 2007, 2008, 2009, 2012, 2016, 2021, 2022, 2023, 2024), 20 Individual Appearances (1996, 1999, 2001, 2002, 2003, 2004, 2005, 2007, 2008, 2009, 2012, 2013, 2014, 2015, 2016, 2021, 2022, 2023, 2024, 2025)
Football (Partnership with Pearl-Cohn High school)	-	-	-
Girls’ Flag Football	Melvin McCullogh	Class A, Region 5	N/A
Boys’ Golf	Caden Anderson	Division I, Class A, Region 5, District 9	3 Individual Appearances (2000, 2013, 2015)
Girls’ Golf	Caden Anderson	Division I, Class A, Region 5, District 9	1 Team Appearance (2017), 4 Individual Appearances (2015, 2016, 2017, 2018)
Soccer	James Campbell, Melissa Farrow	Division I, Class AA, Region 5, District 10	2 Appearances (2023, 2010)
Girls’ Soccer	Melissa Farrow, Edras Vallecillo	Division I, Class AA, Region 5, District 10	N/A
Girls’ Softball	Jemarcus McInnis, Eddie Martin, Jalin Randolph	Division I, Class 3A, Region 5, District 10	N/A
Boys’ Tennis	Joseph Walker	Division I, Class A, Region 5, District 9	3 Appearances (2015, 2007, 2006), 1 Individual Champion (2007)
Girls’ Tennis	Joyce Eatherly	Division I, Class A, Region 5, District 9	1 Appearance (2008)
Boys’ Track and Field	Michael Gabrys, Brandon Ally, Hollee Ally	Division I, Class AA, Middle Section	29 Team Appearances (1995, 1997, 1998, 1999, 2002, 2003, 2004, 2005, 2006, 2007, 2008, 2009, 2010, 2010, 2011, 2012, 2012, 2013, 2014, 2015, 2016, 2017, 2018, 2019, 2021, 2022, 2023, 2024, 2025), 2 Team Runner-up titles (2012, 2004), 6 Team Champion titles (2023, 2022, 2013, 2010, 2009, 2005), 29 Individual Appearances (1995, 1997, 1998, 1999, 2002, 2003, 2004, 2005, 2006, 2007, 2008, 2009, 2010, 2010, 2011, 2012, 2012, 2013, 2014, 2015, 2016, 2017, 2018, 2019, 2021, 2022, 2023, 2024, 2025), 10 Individual Champions (2025, 2021, 2014, 2013, 2012, 2010, 2009, 2005, 2003, 2002)
Girls’ Track and Field	Ron Moseley, Christian Reynolds	Division I, Class AA, Middle Section	45 Team Appearances (1994, 1995, 1996, 1997, 1998, 1999, 2000, 2000, 2001, 2002, 2002, 2003, 2003, 2004, 2004, 2005, 2006, 2007, 2008, 2009, 2009, 2010, 2010, 2011, 2011, 2012, 2012, 2013, 2013, 2014, 2014, 2015, 2015, 2016, 2017, 2017, 2018, 2019, 2021, 2022, 2022, 2023, 2023, 2024, 2025), 5 Team Runner-up titles (2024, 2022, 2017, 2009, 1997), 12 Team Champion titles (2025, 2023, 2022, 2017, 2013, 2012, 2011, 2010, 2007, 2000, 1997, 1996), 47 Individual Appearances (1994, 1995, 1996, 1997, 1998, 1999, 2000, 2000, 2001, 2002, 2002, 2003, 2003, 2004, 2004, 2005, 2006, 2007, 2008, 2009, 2009, 2010, 2010, 2011, 2011, 2012, 2012, 2013, 2013, 2014, 2014, 2015, 2015, 2016, 2017, 2017, 2018, 2019, 2021, 2022, 2022, 2023, 2023, 2024, 2024, 2025, 2025), 12 Individual Champion titles (2025, 2024, 2023, 2022, 2017, 2013, 2011, 2010, 2009, 2004, 2002, 1997)
Girls’ Volleyball	Fallan Lloyd Lloyd, Leslie Coffey, Elisa Ray	Division I, Class AA, Region 5, District 10	N/A
Wrestling	Ronquai Love, Ravin Kapadia, Avery Martin	Division I, Class A, Region 7, District 13	25 Appearances (2023, 2022, 2021, 2014, 2013, 2012, 2011, 2010, 2009, 2007, 2006, 2005, 2004, 2003, 2002, 2001, 2000, 1999, 1998, 1997, 1996, 1995, 1993, 1992, 1991)
Girls’ Wrestling	Avery Martin, Ravin Kapadia	Region 7	N/A

Middle School Sports:

- Boys'/girls' Basketball
- Boys'/girls' Cross Country
- Football (Partnership with Moses McKissack Middle School)
- Girls' Flag Football (Partnership with Head Middle School)
- Cheerleading
- Boys'/girls' Soccer
- Boys'/girls' Track and Field
- Girls' Volleyball
- Wrestling

== Rivals ==
MLK Magnet's sports and academic rival is Hume-Fogg High School located less than 2 miles from the school.

== Notable alumni ==
=== Pearl High School ===
- Les Hunter, professional All-Star basketball player, NCAA champion
- Ted McClain, professional basketball player
- Vivien Thomas, who helped to develop surgical techniques to treat blue baby syndrome and was subject of documentary "Partners of the Heart," attended Pearl High School in 1920s
- Perry Wallace, first African American SEC basketball player
- Norman Thomas "Turkey" Stearnes, class of 1922, National Baseball Hall of Fame and Museum Negro league baseball player from 1923-1940

=== Magnet School ===
- Anthony Davis, Tennessee State Representative
- Jim Gilliam, Major League Baseball player (1953-1966), 4-time World Series champion
- Cary Ann Hearst, musician
- Eiman Jahangir, cardiologist, astronaut on Blue Origin NS-26, first Iranian-American male astronaut
- Dee Rees, screenwriter
- Gerald Robinson, professional basketball player for AS Monaco Basket
- Mageina Tovah, actress known for her role in Spider-Man 2 and Spider-Man 3 movies as Ursula Ditkovitch and on TV show Joan of Arcadia as Glynis Figliola.
- Clay Travis, conservative political commentator
