= Hubbard House (Nashville, Tennessee) =

Historic house in Tennessee, United States

- U.S. National Register of Historic Places
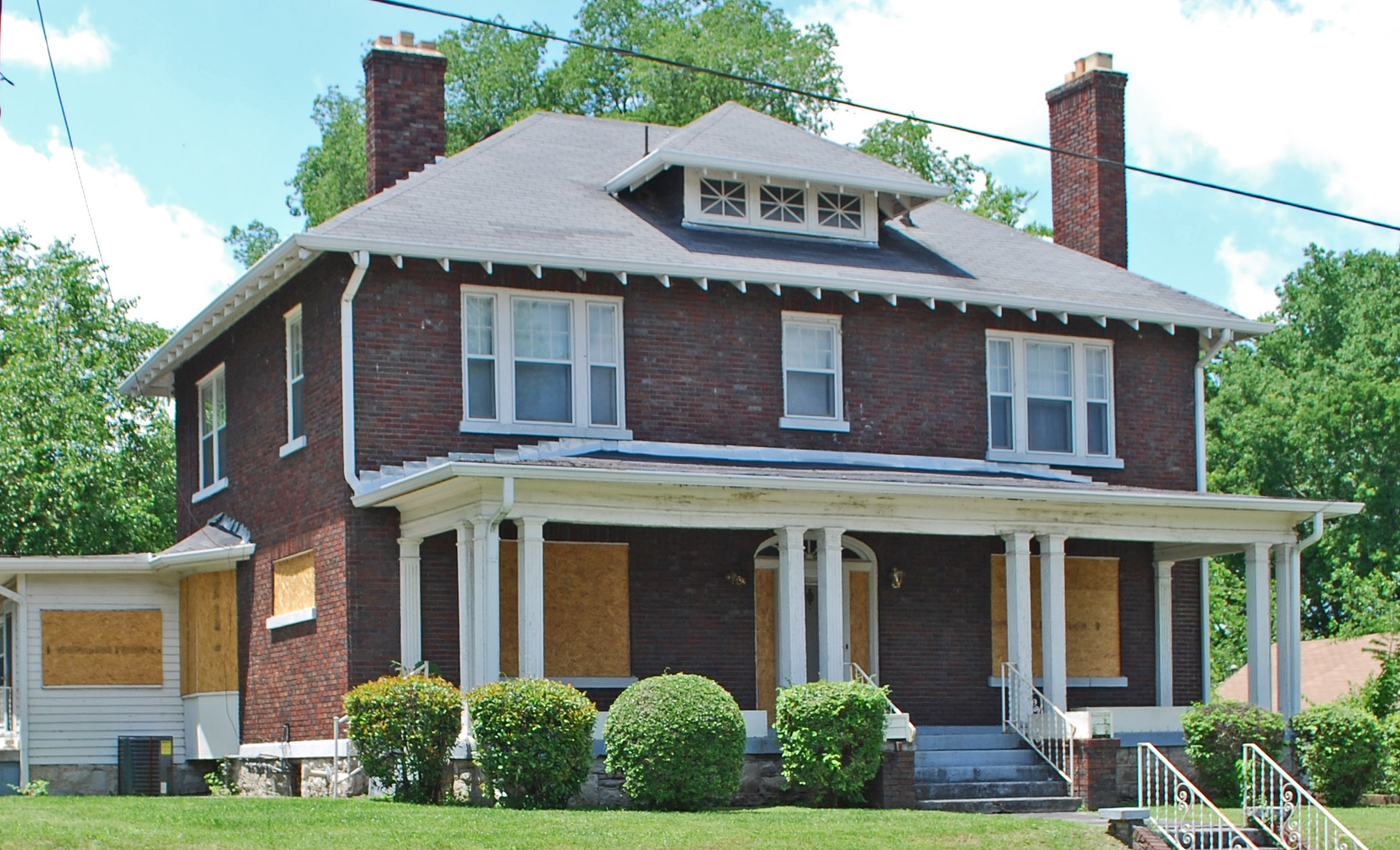
- The Hubbard House in 2010

- Location within Tennessee
- Location: 1109 1st Avenue, South, Nashville, Tennessee
- Coordinates: 36°8′48″N 86°45′50″W
- Area: 5 acres (2.0 ha)
- Built: 1921
- Architectural style: Neo-Classic
- MPS: McKissack and McKissack Buildings TR (AD)
- NRHP reference No.: 73001760
- Added to NRHP: August 14, 1973

The Hubbard House is a historic house in Nashville, Tennessee, U.S.. It was built in 1921 by architecture firm McKissack and McKissack for Dr. George W. Hubbard, the then-president of Meharry Medical College, an African-American medical school. It was built on its original campus, and its construction was funded by trustees and alumni.

It has been listed on the National Register of Historic Places since August 14, 1973.
