= Randy Wood (music producer) =

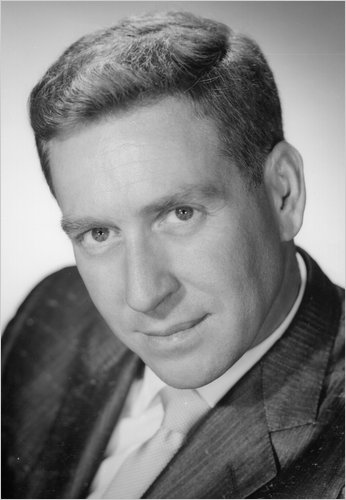

Background information
- Born: Randolph Clay Wood; March 30, 1917; McMinnville, Tennessee, United States
- Died: April 9, 2011 (aged 94) La Jolla, California, United States
- Occupations: record Producer, company founder

Randolph Clay Wood (March 30, 1917 – April 9, 2011) was an American record producer and the founder of Nashville-based Dot Records, one of the most successful independent record labels of the 1950s and 1960s.

== Early life ==
He was born in McMinnville, Tennessee, the only son of two teachers, and began constructing radio sets as a child. He graduated from Middle Tennessee State University in 1941, and served in the US Army Air Forces as a radio engineer during World War II.

In 1945, he opened a store in Gallatin, Tennessee selling electrical appliances and some records. After noticing that many teenagers were seeking rhythm and blues records by musicians such as Joe Liggins and Cecil Gant, he started a mail order business for hard-to-find records, in collaboration with Nashville radio DJs Gene Nobles and Bill "Hoss" Allen. He began stocking R&B records for sale to a white audience, and by 1950, the store had become Randy's Record Shop. He also started small local labels with Nobles, recording and issuing discs by Gant and others.

Wood was the grandfather of political activist and media personality John Wood Jr.

== Career ==
He became co-owner of a local radio station, WHIN, and in January 1950 set up Dot Records, with Nobles, so as to release recordings by musicians who appeared on the station. These included honky-tonk pianist Johnny Maddox, gospel singers the Fairfield 4, and R&B group the Griffin Brothers, whose song "Weepin' & Cryin'" (Dot 1071) reached no.1 on the R&B chart in early 1952. Other R&B musicians on early Dot releases included Joe Liggins, Ivory Joe Hunter, and The Counts. Dot Records' first pop success came in 1952, with "Tryin'" by The Hilltoppers, followed by "P.S. I Love You". Wood also recorded country musicians such as Mac Wiseman and Jimmy C. Newman, who both had several national hits on the country music chart.

By 1955, Wood realised that there was a market for R&B songs re-recorded by white singers, which would allow them to be played on pop music stations catering for a white audience. At the time, many pop radio stations in the US would not play records by black musicians, despite the growing popularity of artists such as Fats Domino and Chuck Berry among white teenagers. He signed young singer Pat Boone to Dot, and had him record cover versions of R&B songs, including "Ain't That a Shame" — originally titled "Ain't It a Shame", and which Boone at one point wanted to retitle "Isn't That a Shame" — and Little Richard's "Tutti Frutti". The songs were hits and, although Boone gave up recording such cover versions in 1956 in order to record more ballads — mostly orchestrated by Billy Vaughn of the Hilltoppers, who had become Dot's musical director — he remained associated with the watering-down of R&B records for a wider audience.

In 1956, Wood moved Dot Records to Hollywood, and found further commercial success with records by actor Tab Hunter, whom he signed because of Hunter's appeal to young women without regard to his musical inadequacies. Wood sold Dot Records to Paramount Pictures in 1957, while continuing as the label's president for a further decade. Increasingly he bought or leased recordings from small independent labels, before leaving the label in 1967.

He then started another label, Ranwood, with Larry Welk, the son of musician Lawrence Welk. The company remains in business as part of the Welk Music Group. Randy's Record Shop in Tennessee also continued in business until 1991, and has since been declared a historical site.

== Personal life ==
Wood had a son (born 1951).

== Death ==
Wood died from complications from a fall at his home in La Jolla, California, on April 9, 2011, at the age of 94.

== Namesake ==
He was not related to Randall "Randy" Wood, president of Vee-Jay Records and founder of the Mira label, who died in 1980.
