= WLYJ =

WLYJ may refer to:

- WLYJ (FM), a radio station (98.9 FM) licensed to serve Quitman, Mississippi, United States
- WKTH, a radio station (88.5 FM) licensed to serve Tullahoma, Tennessee, United States, which held the call sign WLYJ from 2012 to 2018
