= WLVN (FM) =

Radio station in Woodbury, Tennessee

- Woodbury, Tennessee; United States
- Broadcast area: Nashville metropolitan area
- Frequency: 104.9 MHz

Programming
- Format: Contemporary Christian
- Network: K-Love

Ownership
- Owner: Educational Media Foundation
- Sister stations: WAIV, WKTH, WLFM, WLVU

History
- First air date: 1991
- Former call signs: WLMM (1991–1994); WBOZ (1994–2024)
- Call sign meaning: "K-Love Nashville"

Technical information
- Licensing authority: FCC
- Facility ID: 15531
- Class: A
- ERP: 6,000 watts
- HAAT: 100 meters (330 ft)
- Transmitter coordinates: 35°49′33.00″N 86°9′28.00″W

Links
- Public license information: Public file; LMS
- Webcast: Listen Live
- Website: klove.com

WLVN (104.9 MHz) is a radio station licensed to Woodbury, Tennessee, United States. Together with WLVU (97.1 FM), licensed to Belle Meade, it broadcasts the K-Love network of contemporary Christian music to the Nashville metropolitan area.

== History ==
The station was established as a construction permit under the call sign of WLMM on August 23, 1991. The station would not officially sign on until June 1, 1994, under the call sign of WBOZ, and began broadcasting a Southern gospel format, branded as "Solid Gospel 105", in which it broadcast the national Solid Gospel format, which would later rebrand to Singing News Radio. The station was then considered to be the Flagship Station for the Network.

In December 1999, the stockholders of Reach Satellite Network agreed to sell the company and its broadcast assets to Salem Communications. (Now doing business as Salem Media Group.) At the time of the sale, Reach Satellite Network held the broadcast licenses for WBOZ and WVRY (105.1 FM in Waverly, Tennessee), as the Solid Gospel format was simulcasted on both Stations at the time. The FCC approved the transfer of control on February 15, 2000, and completion of the transaction took place on March 31, 2000. On March 9, 2007, Salem sold WVRY to Grace Broadcasting Services, for a total of $900,000. The deal gained FCC approval on May 23, 2007, and was completed on May 29, 2007. But however, Salem retained WBOZ.

WBOZ would broadcast the Southern gospel format from 1994 until July 2012, when the station began simulcasting Salem Media's "The Fish" Contemporary Christian Format, which was heard on WFFH (Now Air1 Station WAIV on 94.1 FM) and WFFI (93.7 FM).

On March 21, 2024, Salem Media Group announced that they were selling their Nashville Christian AC "Fish" brands to Educational Media Foundation for $7 million, those stations being WFFH, WFFI and WBOZ. On May 1, EMF began a local marketing agreement to program the stations, immediately programming K-Love on WBOZ and WFFI (WFFI would be resold six months later and become Family Radio Owned Station WFRW). The LMA between Salem Media and EMF was in place until the sale of the stations was finalized on June 7, 2024. Also in the process, the call sign for WBOZ was then changed to WLVN. Salem's Today's Christian Music/The Fish format was still heard online only at The Fish Website, until February 1, 2025, when Salem sold the remaining Today's Christian Music/The Fish Stations to Educational Media Foundation, and the network itself was discontinued altogether afterwards.

== See also ==
- List of Nashville media
