= Dot Records =

American record label

- Parent company: Independent (1950–57); Paramount Pictures (1957–72); Gulf+Western (1968–74); Famous Music Group (1972–74); ABC Records (1974–78); MCA Records (1985–86); Universal Music Group (2014–17)
- Founded: 1950; 76 years ago (original); 2014; 12 years ago (revival)
- Founder: Randy Wood; Gene Nobles
- Defunct: 1978; 48 years ago (original); 2017; 9 years ago (revival)
- Status: Defunct
- Distributors: Self-distributed (1950–68); Famous Music Group (1968–74); ABC Records (1974–78); MCA Records (1985–86); Big Machine Label Group (2014–17)
- Genre: Various (early); Country (later)
- Country of origin: U.S.
- Location: Nashville, Tennessee

Dot Records was an American record label founded by Randy Wood and Gene Nobles that was originally active between 1950 and 1978. The original headquarters of Dot Records were in Gallatin, Tennessee. In its early years, Dot specialized in artists from Tennessee. Then it branched out to include musicians from across the U.S. It recorded country music, rhythm and blues, polkas, waltzes, gospel, rockabilly, pop, and early rock and roll.

After moving to Hollywood in 1956, Dot Records bought many recordings by small local independent labels and issued them nationally. In 1957, Wood sold the label to Paramount Pictures, but remained in charge until 1967, when he departed to join Lawrence Welk in the formation of Ranwood Records.

In 1968, the label was acquired as part of the acquisition of Paramount by Gulf+Western, which transitioned it to recording exclusively country music and placed it under the management of Famous Music in 1971. Gulf+Western sold its labels to ABC in 1974. Dot was renamed to ABC-Dot Records before closing in 1978.

The label was reactivated in 2014 through a joint venture between Big Machine Label Group and the Republic Records unit of Universal Music Group (which owns the original Dot Records catalog). Based in Nashville, Tennessee, the label was retired in 2017.

== History ==
=== Early years ===
Dot's founder, Randy Wood, a veteran of the Army during World War II, settled in Gallatin, Tennessee. There he started an appliance store named Randy's, and began carrying records as an afterthought in 1947. Wood initially carried records in the classical and popular genres, but found his customers were asking for records of such rhythm and blues artists as Joe Liggins, Roosevelt Sykes, and Cecil Gant. They were staples of the playlist of Nashville's CBS Radio affiliate, WLAC.

After discovering that their records were available only in limited quantities—and not in Gallatin—Wood formed a mail-order operation by placing a short advertisement with WLAC personalities "Hoss" Allen and Gene Nobles. By 1950, his record sales had far surpassed that of the appliances he carried and he renamed his store Randy's Record Shop. As an extension, he formed a label named Randy's, which released "Gene Nobles' Boogie" by Richard Armstrong, and Record Shop Special, which had Gant on its roster.

After Wood purchased local radio station WHIN, he and Nobles formed Dot, a more widely distributed label, whose first headquarters were in that station's building. Since WHIN broadcast only in the daytime, recording sessions were at night when the station was off the air. One of the first artists he recorded was the young Johnny Maddox, who packed records for him at his store, and whose honky tonk piano style graced Dot Records for almost twenty years. Wood's roster of R&B artists included Ivory Joe Hunter, Joe Liggins, the Four Dots, the Big Three Trio, Brownie McGhee, Shorty Long, the Counts, and the Griffin Brothers, who had a number one R&B hit with "Weepin' & Cryin'" (with vocal by Tommy Brown) in 1951. His country artists included Mac Wiseman, who had hits with "The Ballad of Davy Crockett" and "Jimmy Brown the Newsboy", and, more famously, Jimmy "C." Newman, who scored many hits on the label (the biggest being "Cry, Cry, Darling") before leaving for MGM Records in 1958. Wood also recorded such gospel artists as the Fairfield 4, the Gateway Quartet, the Golden Voice Trio, Rosa Shaw, Joe Warren, the Singing Stars, and the Brewsteraires.

Dot's first major pop act was The Hilltoppers, whose hits included "P.S. I Love You" and "Trying"; when lead singer Billy Vaughn hit #2 with a revival of Wayne King's "Melody of Love", he left the group to become the label's main musical director.

Wood, seeing the demand for rhythm and blues recordings among white audiences, in 1955 hired a number of vocalists to do pop-oriented covers of tunes popular in the genre. The most notable artist who performed that function for Dot was Pat Boone, who outsold the original recordings of the Charms' "Two Hearts", Fats Domino's "Ain't It a Shame" (which was changed to the slightly more grammatically correct "Ain't That a Shame"), the Five Keys' "Gee Whittakers!", Little Richard's "Tutti Frutti" and "Long Tall Sally", the El Dorados' "At My Front Door", and Ivory Joe Hunter's "I Almost Lost My Mind". Boone in the late spring of 1956 opted to switch to original material in the Bing Crosby/Frank Sinatra tradition.

Other notable artists who did R&B covers for Dot included the Fontane Sisters (who covered the Jewels' "Hearts of Stone", the Teen Queens' "Eddie My Love", the Drifters' "Adorable", the Marigolds' "Rollin' Stone", and Fats Domino's "Please Don't Leave Me"), Snooky Lanson (with covers of the Jacks' "Why Don't You Write Me" and the Dream Weavers' "It's Almost Tomorrow"), and actress Gale Storm (with covers of Frankie Lymon's "Why Do Fools Fall in Love" and Smiley Lewis' "I Hear You Knocking". (This last was revived by Dave Edmunds in 1970).

In 1956, Dot also made a noteworthy contribution to the Easy Listening genre by releasing a recording of popular music arranged by John Serry (Squeeze Play, DLP-3024, 1956). Also in 1956 novelty artist Nervous Norvus (Jimmy Drake) had 2 hit singles with "Transfusion" and "Ape Call". His third and last single "The Fang" did not chart at all.

=== Paramount years ===
Dot Records logo after its sale to Paramount Pictures combined the original Dot script logo with the Paramount mountain and halo of stars symbol.

In late 1956, Wood signed Warner Bros. star Tab Hunter to a record contract after Chicago disc jockey Howard Miller suggested to Wood that he might want to sign Hunter, who was enormously popular and had just packed a stage show in Chicago with screaming girls. Wood asked if Hunter could sing, but Miller replied, "I don't know, it doesn't matter, I guess." Tab Hunter was the first to tell Wood that he could not sing a note. However, after giving Hunter the Ric Cartey tune "Young Love", Wood told producer Milt Rogers to repeatedly teach Hunter how to sing it until he finally reached the point where he could. The record topped the charts in 1957; Dot's release of a follow-up record from Hunter ("Ninety-Nine Ways") frustrated Warner Bros. chief Jack L. Warner, who retaliated by forming Warner Bros. Records and placing Hunter on the label as its first artist.

In 1957, Wood sold the label to Paramount Pictures, but he remained president for another decade. Dot (and Wood) then moved to Hollywood, where the label began to release soundtrack albums, including Elmer Bernstein's score for The Ten Commandments (1956), a 2-LP set that played longer than the usual record album.

Remakes were commonplace at Dot in the 1960s, with the label having artists such as Tony Martin, Jo Stafford, Vaughn Monroe, Gene Austin, Jimmie Rodgers, the Andrews Sisters, Debbie Reynolds and Eddie Fisher re-record their old hits at various times; in 1968, Dot issued a various-artists album devoted to remakes of these artists' million-sellers.

During the late 1950s and 1960s, Wood would re-enter the rock and roll market by licensing material from independent producers. Most of his acquisitions charted and became major hits, including leases of Sanford Clark's "The Fool" from producer Lee Hazlewood, Bonnie Guitar's "Dark Moon" from Fabor Records, the Del-Vikings' "Come Go with Me" from Fee-Bee Records, Jimmie Dee and the Offbeats' "Henrietta" from Bob Tanner's TNT Records, Robin Luke's "Susie Darlin'" from Bertram International Records, Lonnie Donegan's "Does Your Chewing Gum Lose Its Flavour (On the Bedpost Overnight?)" from Pye Records, the Chantays' "Pipeline" from Downey Records, the Surfaris' "Wipe Out" from the Princess label, and the Fireballs' "Sugar Shack" from producer Norman Petty. The label's success on the pop charts would be negatively impacted by the success of The Beatles and the subsequent British Invasion, and there were times, between 1964 and 1967, when it could not place a song on the Billboard Hot 100 or even the Bubbling Under Hot 100 chart.

Pat Boone had further success in the 1960s, registering a #1 hit in 1961 with "Moody River", then coming back in 1962 with a #6 hit with "Speedy Gonzales". He was one of the Big Three Dot album sellers of the 1960s, along with Billy Vaughn and Lawrence Welk, whose orchestra members, such as Myron Floren, Jo Ann Castle, Joe Feeney and Bob Ralston, released records alongside him in the 1960s. Welk and Vaughn in particular regularly appeared in the album top-twenty. Johnny Maddox, banjo player Eddie Peabody, Steve Allen, Louis Prima, Keely Smith, the Mills Brothers and organists Eddie Baxter and George Wright made many albums for Dot as well. Known for artist loyalty, many of these artists stayed with Dot for over a decade, partly because Wood had a reputation for fairmindedness. His label was not impacted by any of the record industry scandals of the 1950s and Wood told a 1959 congressional hearing on payola that his books were open

Hamilton Records, a subsidiary, was founded in 1958 for rockabilly and rhythm & blues. It also functioned as a venue for albums by their regular roster of artists that could be retailed for $1.98, since all or most of the material featured on them was in the public domain, thereby obviating the need to pay song royalties. It distributed Steed Records and the only two records from Carnival, owned by Herb Alpert and Jerry Moss. Two other subsidiary labels were created: Crystalette Records and Acta Records. In 1967, Dot picked up distribution of DynoVoice, owned by Bob Crewe, from Bell Records. Later in 1967, Randy Wood left Dot to found Ranwood Records with Welk.

=== Country music label ===
Dot's logo after Gulf+Western acquired Paramount. The Paramount logo was removed when Famous Music took over.

Two years after Paramount was purchased by Gulf and Western in 1968, Dot was rebranded as a country music label, a move which revitalized the label's chart presence, albeit on the Hot Country Songs chart instead of the Hot 100. Country artists on the label included Freddy Fender, Roy Clark, Barbara Mandrell, Billy "Crash" Craddock, Narvel Felts, the Oak Ridge Boys, Don Williams, Tommy Overstreet, John Wesley Ryles, Johnny Carver, Donna Fargo, Red Steagall, Ray Price, Joe Stampley, Buck Trent, Sue Richards, Eddy Raven, Diana Trask, Ray Griff, Ray Pillow, Doug Sahm (formerly of the Sir Douglas Quintet), Joe Barry, and Freddy Weller (formerly of Paul Revere & the Raiders). During the transition, Dot's pop back catalog was deleted and was transferred to the newly founded Paramount label.

In 1971, Gulf and Western placed Dot under the umbrella of the Famous Music Group, which included Paramount Records, Stax (until 1970), and Blue Thumb, with distribution of Sire (now owned by Warner Music Group) and Neighborhood, originally owned by Melanie Safka. By 1968, Lawrence Welk had acquired his portion of the Dot back catalog and subsequently reissued the material on his own Ranwood label.

With the rest of the Famous Music Group, in 1974, Dot was bought by ABC, which had tried to purchase the label years before, and renamed it to ABC/Dot Records, a name it retained before the label was discontinued at the start of 1978. The ABC/Dot headquarters became the Nashville office of ABC Records.

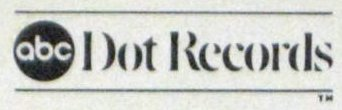
The ABC/Dot Records logo. The logo first read 'ABC/Dot' and the word 'Records' was added later.

ABC Records was then sold to MCA Records in 1979. MCA's Nashville division briefly revived the Dot label in 1985–86 for a series of one-off albums by country music artists such as Jan Howard, Jeanne Pruett, Jim Ed Brown and the Browns, Carl Perkins, Billie Jo Spears, Porter Wagoner, and Tompall Glaser.

The merger of the MCA Records and PolyGram Records families became the foundation for Universal Music Group in 1999. Currently, the Dot pop music catalog is managed by Universal Music's Geffen Records. The country back catalog is managed by the former Decca and Coral unit, which was rebranded as MCA Nashville, except for those by Roy Clark and Hank Thompson (owned by their respective estates). Randy Wood died at age 94 in his La Jolla, California, home on April 9, 2011, from complications after a fall.

=== Revival ===
Big Machine Records revived the Dot Records name for a new label in March 2014. The label's first signees included Maddie and Tae, Drake White, and Steven Tyler. Big Machine discontinued the label in 2017.

== Artists ==
(**indicates a master purchase/lease from another record company)

- Liberace
- Hal Aloma
- Arthur Alexander
- Steve Allen
- Pat Boone
- Ashley Campbell
- Jo Ann Castle
- The Chantays**
- Children of Rain
- Roy Clark
- Sanford Clark**
- Colours
- Donna Fargo
- Fear Itself
- Freddy Fender
- Jack Fina
- The Fireballs
- Eddie Fisher
- Myron Floren
- Brian Foley
- The Fontane Sisters
- The Four Lads
- William Frawley
- Bob Gaddy
- Cecil Gant
- Jan Garber
- Althea Gibson
- Jimmy Gilmer & The Fireballs
- The Griffin Brothers featuring Margie Day
- Bonnie Guitar
- The Jack Halloran Singers
- Hamilton Streetcar
- Roy Head
- The Kendalls
- Gary Usher
- Jack Kerouac
- Anita Kerr
- Andy Kim (Steed)
- Robert Knight
- Sonny Knight
- The Lennon Sisters
- Wally Lewis
- Liberace
- Jim Lowe
- Warren Luening
- Robin Luke**
- Maddie & Tae
- Johnny Maddox
- Barbara Mandrell
- Tony Martin
- Leonard Nimoy
- Ken Nordine
- Nervous Norvus**
- Larry Novak
- Tommy Overstreet
- Paramounts
- Bunny Paul
- Eddie Peabody
- Marty "The Phantom" Lott
- Jimmie Rodgers
- Mitch Ryder (DynoVoice) (catalog now controlled by Rhino Records/Warner Music Group)
- Sharon Smith
- The Sunshine Boys
- The Surfaris**
- Hank Thompson

== See also ==
- List of record labels
