= Grizzard =

Grizzard is a surname. Notable people with the surname include:

- Ephraim Grizzard (died 1892), African-American lynching victim
- Frank E. Grizzard, Jr. (born 1954), American historian, writer, and documentary editor
- George Grizzard (1928–2007), American actor
- Herman Grizzard (died 1971), American radio disc jockey
- Lewis Grizzard (1946–1994), American writer and humorist
- Rod Grizzard (born 1980), American basketball player
