= WFRW =

WFRW may refer to:

== Current ==
- WFRW (FM), a radio station (93.7 FM) licensed to serve Kingston Springs, Tennessee

== Former ==
- WLXJ, a radio station (88.9 FM) licensed to serve Battle Ground, Indiana, United States, which held the call sign WFRW from 2014 to 2016
- WKEL (FM), a radio station (88.1 FM) licensed to serve Webster, New York, United States, which held the call sign WFRW from 1984 to 2013
