= WFRW (FM) =

Contemporary Christian radio station in Smyrna, Tennessee

Kingston Springs, Tennessee; United States
- Broadcast area: Nashville metropolitan area
- Frequency: 93.7 MHz
- Branding: Family Radio

Programming
- Format: Christian radio
- Affiliations: Family Radio

Ownership
- Owner: Family Radio; (Family Stations, Inc.)

History
- First air date: 1992
- Former call signs: WYYB (1991–2003); WFFI (2003–2024)
- Call sign meaning: Family Radio

Technical information
- Licensing authority: FCC
- Facility ID: 18714
- Class: A
- ERP: 1,150 watts
- HAAT: 230 meters (750 ft)
- Transmitter coordinates: 36°8′10.00″N 86°59′4.00″W

Links
- Public license information: Public file; LMS
- Webcast: Listen Live
- Website: familyradio.org

WFRW (93.7 MHz) is an FM radio station broadcasting in the Middle Tennessee area. WFRW is licensed to Kingston Springs, with the station serving the Nashville metropolitan area.

The station is currently owned by Family Radio. The station broadcasts a Calvinist teaching and hymns format.

== History ==
WFFI was previously operated under the callsign WYYB, and was a simulcast of WRLG (Now WAIV-FM), which broadcast the active rock format under "Thunder 94", the AAA format under "The Phoenix", and was briefly a simulcast of WRLT. Prior to this, it was briefly the FM affiliate of WDKN, a community-oriented station in Dickson, Tennessee, to which it was originally licensed.

Shortly before the sale to Salem Media Group, WYYB began simulcasting then-sister station WRLT. WYYB along with WRLG would be sold to Salem Media on August 14, 2002, and would switch to the Contemporary Christian format branded as "The Fish" the next day on August 15, and would change its callsign to WFFI.

=== Sale to Educational Media Foundation then to Family Radio ===
On March 21, 2024, Salem Media Group announced that they were selling their Nashville Christian AC "Fish" brands to Educational Media Foundation for $7 million, those stations being WFFH, WFFI and WBOZ. A network affiliation agreement took effect on May 1 ahead of closing the sale.

At the stroke of midnight on May 1, 2024, WFFI along with WBOZ (Now WLVN) began airing the national K-LOVE radio feed without explanation, following the implementation of a local marketing agreement between Salem Media and Educational Media Foundation. The sale of the three stations were finalized on June 7, 2024. Salem's Today's Christian Music/The Fish was still heard online only at The Fish Website, until February 1, 2025, when Salem sold the remaining Today's Christian Music/The Fish stations to Educational Media Foundation, and the network itself was discontinued altogether afterwards.

On October 2, 2024, Franklin, Tennessee based Family Radio announced that they would acquire WFFI from Educational Media Foundation for $2.1 million. With this acquisition, not only did Family Radio enter and have its first station in the Middle Tennessee area but it also secured a signal that covered its new national headquarters in Franklin. The deal included WFFI's tower property, and a network affiliation agreement that took effect on Tuesday, October 15, 2024 with the station launching its "Family Radio" Christian preaching programming. WFFI's callsign changed to WFRW in the process. On Monday October 7, 2024, WFFI suspended K-Love Programming & ran a repeating looping message, redirecting listeners to WLVU 97.1 FM & WLVN 104.9 FM, which continues to play the K-Love format. The Family Radio Calvinist teaching & music format on 93.7 FM began at midnight on Tuesday, October 15, 2024.

== See also ==
- List of Nashville media
