= WAUT =

WAUT may refer to:

- WAUT-LD, a low-power television station (channel 21) licensed to serve Auburn, Alabama, United States; see List of television stations in Alabama
- WKTH, a radio station (88.5 FM) licensed to serve Tullahoma, Tennessee, which held the call sign WAUT from 1997 to 2012
