= Tommy Brown (singer) =

American R&B singer

- Also known as: Tommy "Weepin' and Cryin'" Brown "Little" Tommy Brown "Cryin'" Tommy Brown
- Born: May 27, 1931; Lumpkin, Georgia, U.S.
- Died: March 12, 2016 (aged 84)
- Genres: Blues, R&B
- Occupations: Musician
- Instruments: Vocals
- Years active: 1949 - 1977, 2001 - 2016
- Labels: Regent, Dot, Savoy, King, United, Groove, Imperial
- Formerly of: The Griffin Brothers

Thomas A. Brown (May 27, 1931 – March 12, 2016) was an American R&B singer who achieved most of his success in the early 1950s, particularly on records with The Griffin Brothers. He also toured with his won group, Tommy B. and his Teardrops.

== Life and career ==
Born in Lumpkin, Georgia, Brown formed a small band with himself as the drummer in the 1940s, and worked in clubs around Atlanta. In 1949 he recorded "Atlanta Boogie" on the Regent label, a subsidiary of Savoy Records. The track contained early references to rock and roll :

Well, the whole town's rockin' just about the break of day
Well, when the bar starts jumpin' you can hear the cats all say
Well, let's rock'n'roll, well, let's rock'n'roll
Yes, let's rock'n'roll till the break of day...

In 1951 he moved on to Dot where he was teamed with the Griffin Brothers, an R&B orchestra led by brothers Jimmy Griffin (trombone) and Ernest "Buddy" Griffin (piano) from Norfolk, Virginia. They had toured widely with Amos Milburn, Paul Williams, and others, and recorded as the backing band for Margie Day on two R&B Top 10 hits, "Street Walkin' Daddy" and "Little Red Rooster".

In August of that same year Brown was featured singer on the R&B Top 10 hit "Tra-La-La", credited to the Griffin Brothers Orchestra, and later in the year the combination reached #1 on the R&B chart with "Weepin' and Cryin'", credited to The Griffin Brothers Orchestra featuring Tommy Brown.

In early 1952, Brown joined the United States Marine Corps, and when he returned in October of the same year, he moved to United Records in Chicago. While Brown was away, his previous label released in March 1952 the "No News From Home" single, which was recorded from earlier sessions. He played for a while in Bill Doggett's band, and claimed to help write Doggett's hit "Honky Tonk". He also recorded with Walter Horton during this period.

In 1958, Brown formed the group Tommy B. and his Teardrops. He went to St. Louis and chose musicians who had played with Billy Gayles and Ike Turner's Kings of Rhythm. His band consisted of Lloyd Wallace, piano; Eugene Washington, drums; Sam Rhodes, bass guitar; Billy Duncan, tenor sax; Bennie Smith, lead guitar; Raymond Hill.

Over the next decade he recorded R&B for a number of smaller labels, including his own T & L Productions which he formed with his wife singer Liz Lands. Brown performed as a comedian in the 1960s and 1970s. He released two live albums for his comedy act, 1967's I Ain't Lyin' and I Ain't Lyin' Vol. 2 a year later.

In 1977, Brown returned to Atlanta to run the Landmark Personal Care Center. After fans sought a return in his musical career, Brown made a comeback in 2001, recording and performing around the world in blues festivals. His past recordings have also been reissued on compilation albums. On May 6, 2015, Brown was inducted into the Blues Hall of Fame in Memphis.

Brown died in 2016, aged 84.

== Discography ==
=== Albums ===
- 1967: I Aint Ly'ing (Live From The Club) (T & L Productions)
- 1968: I Ain't Lying, Vol. Two: Live From The Shed House (TNL Productions)
- 1973: Soul Brother In Heaven And Hell (TNL Productions)
- 2004: Remember Me (Bonedog Records)
- 2009: Rockin' Away My Blues (Bonedog Records)

With Bill Doggett

- 1956: Everybody Dance the Honky Tonk (King Records)

=== Singles ===
- 1951: "V-8 Baby" / "Double-Faced Deacon" (Savoy 813)
- 1951: Griffin Brothers Orch. Featuring Tommy Brown – "Tra-La-La" (Dot 1060)
- 1951: Griffin Brothers Orch. Featuring Tommy Brown – "Weepin' & Cryin'" (Dot 1071)
- 1952: Tommy (Weepin' And Cryin') Brown – "No News From Home" / "Never Trust A Woman" (Savoy 838)
- 1953: Little Tommy Brown – "Goodbye, I'm Gone" / "Since You Left Me Dear" (King 4679)
- 1954: "Southern Women" / "Remember Me" (United 183)
- 1955: Little Tommy Brown – "Don't Leave Me" / "Won't You Forgive Me" (Groove 0132)
- 1956: Little Tommy Brown With The Four Students – "The Thrill Is Gone" / "A Gambler's Prayer" (Groove 0143)
- 1957: "Someday, Somewhere" / "Rock Away My Blues" (Imperial X5476)
- 1958: "Just For You" / "Heart With No Feeling" (Imperial 5533)
- 1960: Griffin Brothers Orch. Featuring Tommy Brown – "Tra-La-La" / "Weepin' And Cryin'" (Dot 16130)
