= WAIV (FM) =

Contemporary Christian radio station in Smyrna, Tennessee

Smyrna, Tennessee; United States
- Broadcast area: Nashville metropolitan area
- Frequency: 94.1 MHz
- Branding: Air1

Programming
- Format: Contemporary worship music
- Network: Air1

Ownership
- Owner: Educational Media Foundation
- Sister stations: WKTH, WLFM, WLVN, WLVU

History
- First air date: 1991
- Former call signs: WYPE (1991–1992); WRLG (1992–2003); WFFH (2003-2024)
- Call sign meaning: "Air1 Nashville"

Technical information
- Licensing authority: FCC
- Facility ID: 68347
- Class: A
- ERP: 3,200 watts
- HAAT: 138 meters (453 ft)
- Transmitter coordinates: 36°1′14.00″N 86°38′18.00″W
- Translator: 92.5 W223BV (Brentwood)

Links
- Public license information: Public file; LMS
- Webcast: Listen live
- Website: www.air1.com

WAIV (94.1 MHz) is an FM radio stations broadcasting in the Middle Tennessee area. WAIV is licensed to Smyrna, Tennessee, with the station serving the Nashville metropolitan area. The station is owned by Educational Media Foundation and is the flagship stations of the Air1 brand based in nearby Franklin, Tennessee.

== History ==
WFFH was previously WRLG, then a sister station to WRLT, owned by Tuned in Broadcasting and airing a modern rock format. In early 1995, the station's programming provider was switched from "The Exxit" (a satellite format from the Major Networks) to The Underground Network (once called WDRE). The station was branded as "Thunder 94". In October 1997, facing intense pressure from WKDF (which had flipped to modern rock some time before), Tuned in Broadcasting pulled the plug on "Thunder 94", and the format changed to "The Phoenix" with an Americana format. Shortly before the sale to Salem Media Group, WRLG began simulcasting then-sister station WRLT. WRLG would be sold to Salem Media on August 14, 2002, and would switch to the Contemporary Christian format branded as "The Fish" the next day on August 15, and would change its callsign to WFFH.

=== Sale to Educational Media Foundation ===
Logo for the 94 FM The Fish trimulcast used, until the three stations sold in 2024.

On March 21, 2024, Salem Media Group announced that they were selling their Nashville Christian AC "Fish" brands to Educational Media Foundation for $7 million, those stations being WFFH, WFFI and WBOZ. A Network Affiliation Agreement took effect on May 1 ahead of closing the sale.

At the stroke of midnight on May 1, 2024, WFFI (Now Family Radio Owned Station WFRW) and WBOZ (Now WLVN) began airing the national K-LOVE radio feed, Meanwhile, WFFH continued to broadcast The Fish format, until that station went off the air at 5 am that morning. WFFH would return to the air that day at noon, with the playing of The Star-Spangled Banner, afterwards, the station returned with a localized Contemporary Christian Format, Simply branded as 94 FM WFFH, However, it was revealed on May 9, 2024, that WFFH would become an Air1 member station, in which it did so on June 3, 2024. The Sale of the Station would be finalized on July 1, 2024. Salem's Today's Christian Music/The Fish format was still heard online only at The Fish Website, until February 1, 2025, when Salem sold the remaining Today's Christian Music/The Fish Stations to Educational Media Foundation, and the network itself was discontinued altogether afterwards. The Callsign for WFFH would also change to the current WAIV callsign on July 9, 2024.

== See also ==
- List of Nashville media
