= The !!!! Beat =

US television program

- Genre: Music
- Presented by: Bill "Hoss" Allen
- Country of origin: United States
- Original language: English
- No. of seasons: 1
- No. of episodes: 26

Production
- Camera setup: Multi-camera

Original release
- Network: Syndication
- Release: 1966 – 1966

The !!!! Beat is an American television program that aired in syndication for 26 episodes in 1966. It was hosted by the Nashville, Tennessee WLAC based disc jockey Bill "Hoss" Allen, and featured a house band led by Clarence "Gatemouth" Brown which included David "Fathead" Newman. The show was recorded in color at WFAA, the ABC affiliate in Dallas, which had color facilities, and recorded and syndicated episodes of the program. At that time, none of the Nashville stations had color capability.

Guests included: Otis Redding, who hosted the final episode, Little Milton, Esther Phillips, Joe Tex, Etta James, Lattimore Brown, Roscoe Shelton, Carla Thomas, Freddie King, Barbara Lynn, Johnny Taylor, The Radiants, Louis Jordan, The Mighty Hannibal, Clarence 'Frogman' Henry, Robert Parker, Joe Simon, Mitty Collier, Jamo Thomas, Z. Z. Hill, Lou Rawls, Bobby Hebb, Willie Mitchell, Don Bryant, The Ovations, The Bar-Kays, Percy Sledge, Garnet Mimms, and Sam & Dave all appeared. Some of the artists would also chart well into the 1970s.

== DVD release ==
The show was rumored to have been lost but to have been discovered by Willie Nelson in his own collection. In 2005, Bear Family Records released all 26 episodes of the show (on six discs) on Region 1 DVD in the United States.
