= WDKN =

Coordinates: 36°06′31″N 87°22′14″W

- Dickson, Tennessee; United States
- Frequency: 1260 kHz
- Branding: 101.5 The Ride

Programming
- Format: Classic hits

Ownership
- Owner: R & F Communications, Inc.
- Sister stations: WDHC-LD

History
- First air date: January 1, 1955

Technical information
- Licensing authority: FCC
- Facility ID: 18713
- Class: D
- Power: 5,000 watts day; 18 watts night
- Translator: 101.5 W268BN (Dickson)

Links
- Public license information: Public file; LMS
- Website: www.wdkn.com

WDKN (1260 AM) is a radio station operating in Dickson, Tennessee. It was formerly owned by Edmisson Communications, a local Dickson company. It is currently owned and operated by R & F Communications, also a local Dickson company.

WDKN broadcasts a 5,000–watt signal during daylight hours but is restricted by the Federal Communications Commission to 18 watts after dark so as not to interfere with out-of-market stations on the same frequency.

== History ==
WDKN's origins date back to the summer of 1954, when John Bailey of Clarksville found an available frequency and thought of Dickson. Bailey started looking for someone to take on the task of co-owning and running a radio station in Dickson on 1260 kHz. It turns out he did not find anyone, but Bill Potts found him. Potts became majority owner in the now three-way partnership, which also included Mitchell Hayes.

On New Years Day 1955, at 1 p.m. Central time, the first words ever to be spoken over the airwaves of WDKN were "This is Hal Smith beginning a history of broadcasting in Dickson, Tennessee....there was a baby born in Wisconsin this morning at 12:01 a.m., and in Dickson, Tennessee here at 1:00 p.m., January 1st 1955, a radio station was born."

WDKN's first studio location was on Main Street above the current downtown Bank of Dickson location. When Mr. Potts, who died in 2004, was asked about the station's philosophy in the early days, he replied "If it happened, we covered it." He also said the station staff worked by a few basic principles, among them "the first thing we do is serve the public, money wouldn't enter into it." Mr. Potts went on to own and work with the station for 25 years.

In late 1960, the studios moved to a building at the corner of College and Poplar Streets, near the present-day locations of Dickson Funeral Home and Dickson Florist. In 1984, Edmisson and Eubanks Communication, Inc., (Tommy Edmisson and Oscar Eubanks and Leroy Kennell) ownership group took control of WDKN. The studios have been at 106 East College Street since the mid-1980s.

Since day one WDKN has been the community's radio station. Among the programs a listener might have heard during the early days of the station were Lost & Found, Saturday Sidelights, Old Timers Program (which continues to run as of 2016), Ida's News and Views with Ida Nicks, and Gospel Echoes, just to name a few. Local singing groups, both live and (especially later) recorded such as Neil Gillum and the Lonesome Valley Boys also performed regularly, particularly during the station's early years. Another staple of early programming was a daily listing of those who were confined to the local Goodlark Hospital, which continued until the hospital was acquired in the 1990s by HCA, which immediately ended the practice over privacy concerns. However, death notices of those in local funeral homes continue to be aired as of 2016.

Many of Dickson County's most notable citizens have regularly hosted shows, among them Bill Potts, Warren Medley (who continued to host Old Timers and Know Your County on Saturday mornings until his retirement shortly before his death at age 90), Henry Ragan (host of Life in the Tennessee Valley, which is now hosted by his son, Dale Ragan), Vernon Hamilton, local physicians Dr. Jimmy Jackson and Dr. Walter Bell, Joe Webster (the staff announcer during most of the 1960s and 1970s), Ralph Easley, L. D. Filson (the station's engineer who also did many live local sports broadcasts over the years), Chris Norman, formerly also editor of the community newspaper The Dickson Herald and many, many more. Many other prominent local citizens have appeared as guests on a regular or infrequent basis. WDKN's studio and transmission equipment was maintained by the station's engineer, L. D. Filson, from about 1958 until his retirement in 1982.

Several of the station's early personalities were crucial in making the annual Old Timer's Day Festival a reality, an event the station continues to cover wall-to-wall each spring and which has long been recognized as one of the best (and best-attended) small-town festivals in Tennessee. WDKN has traditionally been the home of the long-running Dickson County Cancer Crusade Radio Auction every April, with only 2009, when the station was dark, having been missed since the event's inception, prior to the 2020 COVID-19 pandemic, which resulted in its suspension for that year. From its earliest days, WDKN has been the voice for area-wide sports, especially covering Dickson High School Lady Dragon and Dragon Sports, and since the early 70s, Dickson County High School Lady Cougar and Cougar sports.

WDKN became one of the first stations in Tennessee to join the Tennessee Titans Radio Network in 1999, and was saluted as 2004 Titan Partner of the year. The station has also at times broadcast both Vanderbilt University and University of Tennessee sporting events on a selected basis from the Vanderbilt Sports Network and Vol Network, respectively.

On March 19, 2009, WDKN signed off the air after 55 years of serving the community. However, the station would not stay off the air for long. In May 2009, R & F Communications, Inc., led by Lori Reddon Forte (a native of Dickson) and her husband, purchased WDKN AM 1260 from Edmisson and Eubanks Communication, Inc., and returned it to the airwaves in July 2009 as the "New WDKN 1260 AM".

On August 1, 2023, WDKN and its FM translator flipped to a classic hits format under the name "101.5 The Ride".

== Programming ==
WDKN broadcasts primarily classic hits for the Dickson area; as a carryover from its origin as a full-service station it also broadcasts items such as death notices, a community calendar of events, local high school football and basketball games, and the small-town radio staple Swap and Shop, an on-air garage sale whose announcements are free to private, non-commercial vendors.

The station also airs the games of the NFL's Tennessee Titans as an affiliate of the Titans Radio Network. The station is also an affiliate of the RFC Sports Network.

== FM translator ==
In addition to the main station on 1260 kHz, WDKN is relayed by an FM translator, to widen its broadcast area, especially during nighttime hours when the AM station broadcasts with only 18 watts. The FM translator also affords the listener improved high fidelity sound in stereo.

Broadcast translator for WDKN
Call sign	Frequency	City of license	FID	ERP (W)	HAAT	Class	FCC info
W268BN	101.5 FM	Dickson, Tennessee	140472	250	105.1 m (345 ft)	D	LMS
