= Marc Chase =

American radio executive

- Occupations: President, Tribune Interactive - Tribune Company
- Employer: Tribune Media
- Website: http://www.tribune.com

Marc Chase (born April 7, 1960) (aka Mark Thompson) is an American radio executive currently working for Tribune Company as the President of Tribune Interactive.

== History ==
Chase, although born in Indiana, considers himself a native of Alabama. He entered radio broadcasting as a disc-jockey for WRFS in Alexander City, Alabama while attending Auburn University. His on-air career took him to WJHO-Opelika, Alabama, WFRI-Auburn, Alabama, WSGF-Savannah, Georgia, and WMJJ-Birmingham. In August 1984 he was approached by WKXX-Birmingham. In the process of making that move, his name changed to Marc Chase. The next move was to WYHY-Nashville where he became Program Director and led the station to its first ever #1 Arbitron ratings in 1987. In October 1989, Marc Chase left Nashville to become the Program Director and morning co-host of “The Power Pig” (WFLZ-Tampa). The Power Pig became the number one radio station in Tampa, unseating legendary CHR station WRBQ-FM (Q105) in 74 days. In January 1994, Chase left WFLZ to become the operations manager of WEBN-Cincinnati.

When radio began deregulation in 1996, Chase was appointed Regional Vice President of Programming for Jacor Communications. When Jacor was purchased by Clear Channel Communications in 1998, Chase became a Senior Vice President of Programming, a job he held for over a decade.

== Accolades ==
Chase has been the recipient of Radio and Records Awards in multiple formats (CHR and Rock) for programmer and station of the Year (WYHY, WFLZ, WEBN). Marc Chase was the first program director to ever win Billboard Magazines Program Director of the week award twice in one year (1989). He was also named one of the best program directors in Radio by the Trade Magazine Radio Ink.

== Side projects ==
Marc Chase also uses his entertainment talent on the weekly television show Movie Underground on WGN America, playing the character of the Night Watchman. Chase has been playing the Night Watchman since 2008.
