= Coyote McCloud =

American radio personality

- Born: William Lehmann; August 31, 1942
- Died: April 6, 2011 (aged 68); Tennessee, U.S.
- Occupations: Radio host; disc jockey; songwriter
- Spouse: Susan Thomas (divorced)

William Lehmann (August 31, 1942 – April 6, 2011), better known as Coyote McCloud, was a popular radio disc jockey in Nashville, Tennessee. For more than 30 years, he was a drive-time personality at several Nashville radio stations. He first became well known in the early 1970s on WMAK-AM, then a market-dominant rock and roll station, as host of its 7 p.m.–midnight program. He was called "legendary" among DJs.

McCloud was one of the subjects of a CBS 48 Hours documentary in 1992 about "shock radio". McCloud enjoyed his highest level of popularity while working for Y107 (now WRVW) and had his own fan club. He worked at the station for more than 10 years, from 1984 to 1995. McCloud was featured frequently in Billboard.

== Radio career ==
Early in his career, he was an afternoon drive personality at WGOW-AM (owned by Ted Turner) in Chattanooga, using the name Bill Scott. In 1976, his recording of "Nitty Gritty Rock and Roll" was released as 45 rpm record on the Midland South label, distributed by RCA. The song included the catch-phrases he used as a nighttime deejay on WQXI "Quixie" in Atlanta.

While hosting the morning show at Kix 104 (WWKX) in 1983, McCloud was selected by Country Music Television network cofounders Glenn D. Daniels and G. Dean Daniels to be the first on-air voice of the network. When CMTV (later called CMT) launched on March 5, 1983, McCloud provided the first vocal announcement heard on the network under an animated CMTV logo with the words, "You're watching CMTV...Country Music Television...in stereo." He remained the on-air voice of the network from 1983 through 1984.

McCloud also worked at Power Country 103 (WZPC) in the mid-1990s and Oldies 96.3 (WMAK) in the early 2000s. Along with Cathy Martindale, he hosted Coyote & Cathy in the Morning on 96.3 (WMAK FM) and 97.1 WRQQ until late November 2006.

== "Where's the Beef?" ==
Also a songwriter, McCloud wrote a song in 1984 entitled "Where's the Beef?" as a promotion for a Wendy's restaurants' advertising campaign featuring Clara Peller.

== Death ==
Coyote McCloud died of cirrhosis of the liver on April 6, 2011, on his houseboat on Percy Priest Lake, in the company of his ex-wife Susan Thomas and his pet dog Sawyer Black.
