= Gene Nobles =

Gene Nobels
- Born: August 3, 1913; Hot Springs, Arkansas, United States
- Died: September 21, 1989 (aged 76); Nashville, Tennessee, United States
- Occupation: Disc Jockey

Gene Nobles (August 3, 1913 – September 21, 1989) was an American radio disc jockey who attained fame on Nashville radio station WLAC from the 1940s through the 1970s by playing rhythm and blues music.

== Career ==
Nobles was a former carnival barker, bingo dealer, and announcer on several small Southern radio stations. He became the first Euro-American disc jockey on radio to play popular African-American music regularly. He started this practice before early rock-and-roll jockeys such as Alan Freed and before his fellow WLAC announcers "John R." Richbourg, Bill "Hoss" Allen, and Herman Grizzard. The four WLAC announcers produced evening and late-night shows featuring R&B, soul music, and gospel music. They attracted an audience of African-Americans and Euro-American teenagers well into the early 1970s.

Nobles is credited with introducing artists such as Chuck Berry, Fats Domino, and Little Richard, to a wider audience. Before Nobles' breakthrough programming, R&B artists were usually only heard by African-Americans, who attended their performances at nightclubs on the so-called Chitlin' Circuit and purchased their records in black-owned stores. Some conservative whites (especially segregationists) opposed the broadcast of such music, but many others purchased the R&B records and danced to them.

In the early 1960s, Nobles drew complaints by listeners and FCC officials over a suggestive reference made while he read a commercial for White Rose Petroleum Jelly. Nobles regularly used double entendres between the records he played to accentuate his ironic, sarcastic sense of humor.

Nobles battled arthritis most of his adult life. When he had to take time off, Bill "Hoss" Allen often filled in for him. By the mid-1960s, Nobles, like the other disc jockeys, began to tape his programs to air in the evening time slots. He continued to do this until his retirement, which varying sources have placed between 1972 and 1974.

Nobles had a long association with Randy Wood, founder of Dot Records, and Randy's Record Shop in nearby Gallatin, Tennessee. Wood later relocated to Los Angeles. Wood sponsored Nobles' program for many years.

== Personal life ==
Nobles was married to Eleanor Broadwater, who received a writing credit for the Dale Hawkins song "Susie Q", made popular in 1968 by Creedence Clearwater Revival.

== Famous phrases ==
Nobles developed slang phrases which he used frequently. Some of the more famous included:

"Jerks/fillies" – boys/girls.
"From the heart of my bottom" – a suggestive inversion of the traditional testimony to sincerity.
"That's G-A-double L-A-T-I-N, folks" – spelling the name of the town where Randy's Record Shop was located
