= Margie Day =

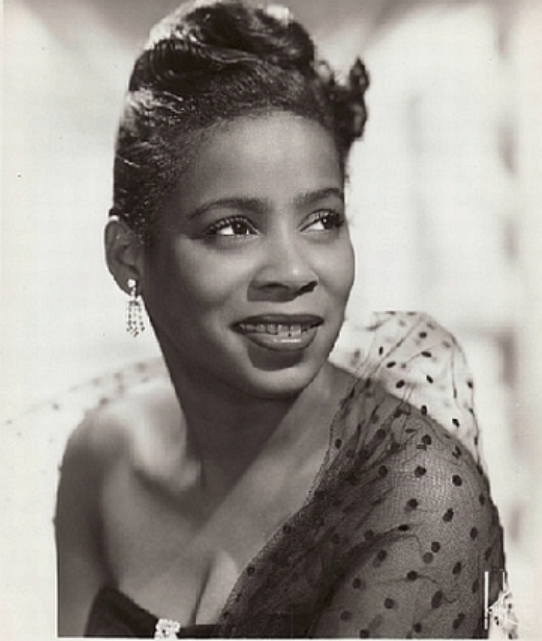

Background information
- Also known as: Margie Day Walker
- Born: Margaret Hoffler; April 6, 1926; Norfolk, Virginia, United States
- Died: September 18, 2014 (aged 88) Norfolk, Virginia, United States
- Genres: Rhythm and blues, pop music
- Years active: 1945–47, 1950–64, 1968–69
- Labels: Coed, Dot, Decca, Atlantic, RCA

Margie Day (born Margaret Hoffler, April 6, 1926 – September 18, 2014), later Margie Day Walker, was an American R&B singer who had success in the 1950s and 1960s.

== Early life and start in show business ==
Margaret Hoffler was born and brought up in Norfolk, Virginia, one of the four children of Kemper Hoffler and his wife Ledora. She grew up listening to the gospel, opera, swing and jazz records bought by her brothers or played on the radio, and took piano lessons.

After graduating from high school, she went to Virginia State College to study music, but soon decided that that was not what she wanted. She returned home to work in a cafeteria at a local military base, where she met a soldier who played piano, and occasionally sang with him. He introduced her to local musician Luther Wilson, whose band she joined in 1945. After a few months she relocated to New York City, and began singing at a lounge in Newark, New Jersey. During this period she began using the stage name Margie Day. She joined a vocal quartet, "Four Bars and a Melody", and recorded a single, "Near You", with them on the Savoy label in 1947. Shortly afterwards, she married and returned to Norfolk to have a baby.

== Recording career ==
In early 1950, she was approached by the Griffin Brothers, a popular local band, and accepted an invitation to join them. She sang with them in Virginia and North Carolina before they received a recording deal with Dot Records. Their first record billed together as Margie Day with the Griffin Brothers Orchestra, "Street Walkin' Daddy" / "Riffin' With Griffin", became a No. 7 hit on the Billboard R&B chart in late 1950, with sales reportedly reaching over fifteen thousand copies a week. The follow-up record was "Little Red Rooster" (unrelated to a Willie Dixon song with the same title and, by Day's account, written by Kay Griffin with help from Day herself), which reached No. 5 on the R&B chart in early 1951. Billboard's review stated: "Thrush packs a load of oomph in this tangy up blues, with okay combo boogie in back." She toured widely with the group in 1951 and 1952, and they released several other singles on the Dot label including "Sadie Green", "I'm Gonna Jump In The River", "The Clock Song (Let Your Pendulum Swing)", and "Pretty Baby", her last entry in the R&B top ten. The group also featured singer Tommy Brown.

In late 1952, she left the Griffin Brothers, joined the Floyd Dixon Combo as featured vocalist, and also began recording solo, her first solo release on Dot being "Midnight". The following year, she joined with the Paul "Hucklebuck" Williams band for a series of concerts and tours, appearing on the same bills as T-Bone Walker, Fats Domino, Charles Brown, Ruth Brown and others. In September 1953, she left Dot Records and signed for Decca, her first release on the new label being the self-penned "Snatching It Back". Although her records—including the suggestive "Take Out Your False Teeth Daddy"—failed to make the charts, she continued to tour widely and successfully with the Paul Williams band through 1954 and early 1955. In May 1955 she recorded for Atlantic Records, who released the single "Pitty Pat Band", credited to Margie Day with the Soul Destroyers, on their subsidiary Cat label. Although it was promoted by disc jockey Alan Freed, it failed to make the charts.

Margie Day continued to perform as a solo singer in the late 1950s, and released records on several labels including DeLuxe (a subsidiary of King Records), Coed and LeGrand. However, having had another baby and tiring of touring, she retired from the music business around 1964 and returned to Norfolk, Virginia. There, she trained in slipcover and drapery design, before returning to sing with a trio led by jazz pianist Dick Morgan, which also featured Nap Shields of the Griffin Brothers on drums. She then signed a new recording contract, with RCA Records, and released two albums of pop and standards in the late 1960s, Dawn of a New Day and Experience. Although sales were disappointing, the albums have subsequently been compared to Billie Holiday, Dinah Washington and Nancy Wilson. Day returned to performing, in Miami, Atlantic City, and Chicago. She was booked to perform in Puerto Rico in 1969, but became ill and the engagement was cancelled.

== Post-music career ==
During her convalescence, in her own words she "found God", and decided finally to give up her career in music. In 1983, under her married name of Margie Day Walker, she launched a community effort in Norfolk, Virginia, aiming to develop and train children in the area in the performing and visual arts, to help foster their intellectual growth, emotional and moral development, and self-esteem. This became the Centerstage children's arts workshop, a not for profit organization incorporated in January 1985, with Margie Day Walker as executive director, and which now finds and develops talented children and coaches them in art, drama, music and dance.

In 2010, rights-management firm Beach Road Music, LLC, acquired the Coed Records catalog, subsequently re-releasing three digitally re-mastered 1961 Margie Day singles on the compilation album From The Vault: The Coed Records Lost Master Tapes, Volume 1.

Margie Day Walker died on September 18, 2014, in Norfolk, Virginia.

== Discography ==
Albums

- Dawn of a New Day (1968, RCA Victor)
- Experience (1969, RCA Victor)

Singles/EP's

- Little Red Rooster/Blues All Alone (1950, Dot Records)
- Little Red Rooster/Riffin with Griffin
- I'm Gonna Raise a Rukus Tonight (Dot Records)
- String Bean/Don't Talk To Me About Men (Dot Records)
- Midnight/Stubborn as a Mule (Deltone Records)
- Bonaparte's Retreat/Hot Pepper (1951, Dot Records)
- I Wanna Go Back (Dot Records)
- Sadie Green/One Steady Date (1951, Dot Records)
- If You Want Some Lovin'/Your Best Friend (1951, Dot Records)
- Stubborn as a Mule/Pretty Baby (1951, Dot Records)
- It'd Surprise You/I'll Get a Deal (1952, Dot Records)
- I'm Gonna Jump in the River/Stormy Night (1952, Dot Records)
- Ace in the Hole (1952, Dot Records)
- Midnight/My Story (1952, Dot Records)
- Mole in the Hole/Just Couldn't Keep It to Myself (1954, Decca Records)
- Old Time Lovin'/I Like What You're Doing (1954, Decca Records)
- Snatchin' It Back (Decca Records)
- I'm Too Busy Cryin' to Care (Decca Records)
- Take My Hand/From Someone Who Cares (1956, DeLuxe Records)
- Dumplin' Dumplin' (1956, DeLuxe Records)
- Tears That Come So Easy/That's The Way Love Goes (1957, DeLuxe Records)
- Send for Me/It Started All Over Again (1957, Coed Records)
- Let Me Know/Send For Me (1961, Coed Records)
- Crazy Over You (1962, Legrand Records)
- Tell Me In The Sunlight (1963, Martay Records)
- Walk Away/Much Too Long (1967, RCA Victor)
- What Does He Think/Time Doesn't Matter Anymore (1968, RCA)

Compilation albums

- I'll Get a Deal (1986 LP vinyl, Mr. R&B Records)
- Blues with a Beat Volume 2 (2006 CD)
- Dawn of a New Day/Experience (2008 CD)
- From The Vault: The Coed Records Lost Master Tapes, Volume 1 (2010 CD)
- Weepin' and Cryin' - The Singles Collection 1950-55 (2023 CD)
