= Bill "Hoss" Allen =

American radio DJ

Background information
- Also known as: Hossman
- Born: William Trosdale Allen III; December 3, 1922; Gallatin, Tennessee, US
- Died: February 25, 1997 (aged 74) Nashville, Tennessee, US
- Occupation: Disc jockey

William Trousdale Allen III (December 3, 1922 – February 25, 1997), also known as "Hossman" or "Hoss", was an American radio disc jockey who attained fame from the 1950s through the 1990s for playing rhythm and blues and black gospel music on Nashville radio station WLAC.

Allen was the youngest of a quartet of disc jockeys known as "The 50,000 Watt Quartet". It included Gene Nobles, "John R." (Richbourg), and Herman Grizzard. Allen had the longest career of any. He worked for radio stations for 45 years before his 1993 retirement. Like Richbourg, from the 1960s through the 1980s, Allen was involved with Nashville's small but vibrant blues and gospel music scenes.

== Early history ==
Allen was reared in the small town of Gallatin, some 35 miles northeast of Nashville, by an African-American domestic who worked for his grandparents. She was primarily responsible for his nurturing and upbringing, which included taking the young boy to church with her on Sundays. This was where Allen grew to love gospel music. Because of their closeness, Allen identified primarily with black youngsters as playmates and peers, an orientation unusual in the segregated South. Because of Bill Allen's tall, athletic frame, his grandfather nicknamed him "Hoss".

Allen became a jazz musician as a youngster. During World War II, he played abroad in USO shows. When peace came, Allen enrolled as an English major at Vanderbilt University, where he developed a reputation as a strong amateur actor. Although he considered joining the professional theater, Allen decided instead to enter what he considered the more promising field of radio. In 1948 he went to work for Gallatin station WHIN hosting the Harlem Hop show. There he used Gene Nobles' routine of playing R&B and jazz tunes, mixed in with standard pop music. His success was so great, that, after only a few months, he approached WLAC for a job. Also in 1948, Allen presented Roy Brown in concert in Nashville.

== Joining WLAC's "50,000 Watt Quartet" ==
Much like John Richbourg, Allen first went on air at WLAC as a talk-show host. He managed to convert that to selling ads and producing programs. He is representative of the "unregulated chaos" of radio in the 1950s. In the mid-1950s, Gene Nobles took a several-years-long leave of absence from his nightly program at WLAC.

"Hoss" Allen then established himself in that slot, peppering the playing of numerous songs by Ray Charles, Little Richard, Fats Domino and John Lee Hooker with "jive talk"-style commercials. His most prominent sponsors were Royal Crown Hair Dressing (unrelated to the cola drink) and Buckley's Record Shop, a Nashville-based mail-order business.

== The "Hugh Baby" interlude ==
Allen's popularity grew steadily until 1960, when he decided to branch out into the record business. He took a job with Chess Records as a field representative.

Replacing him at the station for several years was "Hugh Baby" Jarrett. He was a former member of The Jordanaires vocal group, which backed Elvis Presley at his height of stardom. Jarrett turned the "hep cat" language Allen had used to a younger direction, staging sock hop dances, rotating more rockabilly and rock and roll into the blues/R&B playlist, and using sexually suggestive phrases in the product advertisements. The latter practice led to his termination by WLAC, after the station was reprimanded by the FCC over an incident. Later Jarrett enjoyed lengthy runs at several Atlanta-area stations. Allen was willing to return to WLAC in 1963 and resumed his nightly programs.

== Keeping the beat into the 1960s ==
Allen kept spinning the newest releases from Sam Cooke, Muddy Waters, and Aretha Franklin, while paying attention to the new soul scenes developing in the mid-1960s in two nearby cities: Memphis and Muscle Shoals. Unlike fellow station disk jockeys Richbourg, Nobles, and Grizzard, Allen's playlist emphasized newer releases on his one-to-two-hour shows, heard six nights per week.

According to Wes Smith, in his The Pied Pipers of Rock 'n' Roll: Radio Deejays of the 50s and 60s, "the Hossman" took full advantage of his fame to indulge in drinking and womanizing. These activities led to several run-ins with station management and the occasional problem with police. In the early 1970s, Allen admitted to alcoholism and obtained treatment for his condition, quite likely prolonging his life.

In 1966, Allen hosted a short-lived syndicated television show titled The !!!! Beat. This program featured most of the artists he played on radio. A Dallas TV station with color facilities recorded episodes of the program. At that time, none of the Nashville stations had color capability.

All 26 episodes of the show are currently available on DVD. Allen appeared as host on all but the last show. Reportedly, Allen was so distraught that the show had been cancelled, that he drank and was unable to host the final show. An enthusiastic Otis Redding appeared in the finale.

In the 1960s WLAC's television sister had a similar late-night show on Fridays. Night Train featured many of the artists Allen and his colleagues played on their radio shows. Noble Blackwell, an African-American jockey on a rival Nashville radio station, hosted the show. It was one of the first locally produced programs on a Southern U.S. TV station to feature black musicians prominently. It is believed that Jimi Hendrix made his first television appearance on that program.

== Surviving the purge ==
In the early 1970s, Allen chose to adjust to new management's direction and moved toward more funk and smooth soul offerings, discontinuing most of the oldies. His longtime cohorts Richbourg and Nobles decided to quit rather than change their programs. New management wanted the station schedule to conform to a pop hits format.

By early 1975, "the Hossman" was the lone jockey working at WLAC who had been there as long as five years. After a brief absence from the airwaves, Allen reformatted his show as Early Morning Gospel Time With The Hossman, a showcase for national and regional black gospel acts. In addition, he moved the show from late evening to the pre-dawn hours of the morning. Since he had been taping his programs since about 1970, he did not have to adjust his personal schedule. For about ten years, Allen had a lower public profile than in the show's 1950s/1960s heyday. In off-station time, he worked as a music producer for several local acts.

In the mid-1980s, WLAC's sister station, WLAC-FM (now WNRQ), used Allen's voice in a promotional campaign. As such, his memorable drawling sound was brought back to public consciousness in the Nashville area. Local ad agencies enlisted Allen to supply voiceovers on various radio and television commercials. For several years, this became a quite lucrative sideline.

Allen continued his gospel show until 1993, which was a favorite among his longtime African-American listeners. This was more than a decade after WLAC dropped all other music in favor of a news and talk format in the daytime and paid religion in the evening hours. Although in 1986 and 1987 Allen made an attempt to revive his R&B/soul/blues show on Saturday evenings, the show failed due to lack of promotion and pre-emptions by Vanderbilt football and basketball coverage, the rights to which WLAC held at the time (the station regained the rights in 2012 and broadcasts Vanderbilt sports as of 2021).

After retiring from the show on radio, Allen continued his instantly-recognizable voiceover projects until about a year or so before his death. Allen was the final survivor of the four disc jockeys who comprised "the 50,000 Watt Quartet." In 1994, Bill "Hoss" Allen was inducted into the Blues Hall of Fame in Memphis.
