= WSIX-FM =

Country music radio station in Nashville

Nashville, Tennessee; United States
- Broadcast area: Nashville metropolitan area
- Frequency: 97.9 MHz (HD Radio)
- Branding: The Big 98 WSIX

Programming
- Format: Country music
- Subchannels: HD2: Talk radio (WLAC); HD3: "The Big Legend" (Classic country)
- Affiliations: Premiere Networks

Ownership
- Owner: iHeartMedia, Inc.; (iHM Licenses, LLC)
- Sister stations: WLAC; WNRQ; WRVW; WUBT

History
- First air date: 1948
- Call sign meaning: From 638 Tire Company in Springfield, original home of WSIX (AM) (638 was the store's address, "Where Service Is Excellent" its slogan)

Technical information
- Licensing authority: FCC
- Facility ID: 59815
- Class: C0
- ERP: 100,000 watts
- HAAT: 349 meters (1,145 ft)
- Transmitter coordinates: 36°02′50.00″N 86°49′48.00″W
- Translator: HD2: 98.3 W252CM (Nashville)

Links
- Public license information: Public file; LMS
- Webcast: Listen live (via iHeartRadio); HD2: Listen live (via iHeartRadio); HD3: Listen live (via iHeartRadio)
- Website: thebig98.iheart.com; HD2: wlac.iheart.com; HD3: thebiglegend983.iheart.com

WSIX-FM (97.9 FM, "The Big 98") is a commercial radio station in Nashville, Tennessee, broadcasting a country music format. It is owned by iHeartMedia with studios in Nashville's Music Row district. WSIX-FM is the flagship for The Bobby Bones Show, heard on scores of country radio stations in the U.S. and Canada in morning drive time.

WSIX-FM has an effective radiated power (ERP) of 100,000 watts, the maximum for most FM stations. The transmitter tower is off Old Hickory Boulevard (Tennessee State Route 254) in Forest Hills, Tennessee. WSIX-FM broadcasts using HD Radio technology. Its HD2 subchannel rebroadcasts co-owned 1510 WLAC's talk format. Its HD3 subchannel plays classic country music, which feeds FM translator W252CM at 98.3 MHz.

== History ==
=== Early years ===
The first WSIX-FM signed on the air in 1948. It was the sister station to WSIX 980 AM (now WYFN), on the air since 1927. They were owned by Louis and Jack Draughon and had studios in the Nashville Trust bank building.

The FM station broadcast on 97.5 megacycles. They were network affiliates of ABC Radio, simulcasting its dramas, comedies, news and sports. The stations called themselves "The Voice of Tennessee's Capital City." But few people owned FM receivers in those days and management saw little opportunity to make WSIX-FM profitable. So in the early 1950s, the first WSIX-FM was taken dark. The owners decided to concentrate on setting up a television station, WSIX-TV, originally on channel 8 (now WKRN-TV channel 2).

After a few years, management decided to give FM radio another try. In 1959, the current WSIX-FM came on the air, this time on 97.9 MHz. It still mostly simulcast 980 AM. As network programming moved from radio to television, WSIX-AM-FM began playing country and western hits and other styles of music. In the late 1960s, the Federal Communications Commission (FCC) started requiring AM-FM combos in large cities to separate most of their programming. WSIX-FM began offering a different kind of country sound.

=== Countrypolitan ===
WSIX-FM is credited with pioneering the "countrypolitan" Nashville sound, which developed in the 1960s. Violins and other stringed instruments, and occasionally horns, were added to the traditional fiddle and guitar-driven sound of country music. During those years (beginning in 1967 until the late 1970s) WSIX-FM used the slogan "We're metropolitan country."

As such, WSIX-FM became one of the first successful country-format stations exclusively on the FM dial in the U.S. Until then, country music formats were typically found on AM stations until well into the early 1980s.

Legendary Big 98 logo used from the 1980s to August 2011

=== The Big 98 Era ===
In 1983, WSIX-AM-FM were owned by General Electric. GE decided to sell the AM and FM stations. The television station, WNGE-TV (now WKRN-TV), was also sold to separate owners.

Around that time, the stations were simulcast and the format turned to a more straightforward country sound (i.e., honkey tonk and "outlaw country"). They used the moniker "The Big 98." 98 could refer to the FM station's dial position, rounding off 97.9 MHz. It could also refer to the AM station, dropping the zero from 980 kHz. In 2000, WSIX-FM was acquired by San Antonio-based Clear Channel Communications, a forerunner to today's iHeartMedia.

=== XM simulcast ===
From May 1, 2006 to August 8, 2008, WSIX-FM was simulcast on XM Satellite Radio (channel 161). The satellite feed included some commercials. A song that was not on the station's playlist at the moment would be heard on XM while FM listeners in Nashville were hearing local commercials.

After a leave of absence, on June 8, 2011, WSIX-FM returned to the XM platform, replacing "Nashville" on XM 57. Station owner Clear Channel Communications (now iHeartMedia) sold off its ownership stake in Sirius XM Radio during the second quarter of fiscal year 2013. As a result of the sale, nine of Clear Channel's eleven XM stations, including WSIX-FM, ceased broadcast over XM Satellite Radio on October 18, 2013.

=== HD Radio ===
WSIX-FM began broadcasting in the HD Radio format. For its HD2 subchannel, it launched with a new country format, branded as WSIXtra and later The Nashville Channel. In August 2014, it was replaced by No Shoes Radio, which featured a freeform format curated and hosted by country musician Kenny Chesney. It was also available nationally on the iHeartRadio app and on sister station KNIX-FM. In March 2016, Clear Channel announced that No Shoes Radio would move exclusively to SiriusXM on April 12. On April 1, 2016, the channel was replaced by The Bobby Bones Top 30 Countdown.

On September 2, WSIX-FM HD2 relaunched as classic country station 98.3 The Big Legend. It would be simulcast on FM translator station 98.3 W252CM. On September 21, 2018, the subchannel and translator flipped to a simulcast of co-owned talk radio station WLAC 1510 AM. The Big Legend is currently heard on the HD3 subchannel.

== Emergency Alert System ==
WSIX is the Local Primary 1 (LP1) station for the Emergency Alert System in the Nashville, Tennessee operational area.

== See also ==
- List of Nashville media
