= John R. =

- Birth name: John Richbourg
- Born: August 29, 1910; Manning, South Carolina, United States
- Died: February 15, 1986 (aged 75); Nashville, Tennessee, United States
- Occupations: Disc jockey; record producer; artist manager; musician

John R. (born John Richbourg, August 20, 1910 – February 15, 1986) was an American radio disc jockey who attained fame in the 1950s and 1960s for playing rhythm and blues music on Nashville radio station WLAC. He was also a notable record producer and artist manager.

Richbourg was arguably the most popular and charismatic of the four announcers at WLAC who showcased popular African-American music in nightly programs from the late 1940s to the early 1970s. (The other three were Gene Nobles, Herman Grizzard, and Bill "Hoss" Allen.) Later rock music disc jockeys, such as Alan Freed and Wolfman Jack, mimicked Richbourg's practice of using speech that simulated African-American street language of the mid-twentieth century.

Richbourg's highly stylized approach to on-air presentation of both music and advertising earned him popularity, but it also created identity confusion. Because Richbourg and fellow disc jockey Allen used African-American speech patterns, many listeners thought that both announcers were actually African-Americans. The disc jockeys used the mystique to their commercial and personal advantages until the mid-1960s, when the fact that they were actually white became public knowledge.

== Early history ==
Richbourg was a descendant of French Huguenot immigrants. As a young man, he moved to New York City to work as a theater actor. Because of the Great Depression and lack of work, he shifted to voice work on radio soap operas. Tiring of the instability of life as an actor, Richbourg returned to his native South Carolina. He obtained a job announcing at WTMA in Charleston. After a year there, in 1942 Richbourg moved to WLAC in Nashville. During World War II, from 1943 to 1946, Richbourg served in the U.S. Navy. He returned to Nashville after his honorable discharge and was invited back to his old job on the air.

== From newscaster to "hep cat" ==
WLAC first assigned Richbourg to the news desk. When Gene Nobles took an extended vacation from the station in the late 1940s, Richbourg filled in for him. Richbourg followed Nobles' lead in playing artists such as Otis Rush, Muddy Waters, Howlin' Wolf, and Sonny Boy Williamson, artists primarily heard on specialty jukeboxes and in mostly Southern markets after hours, if at all, on radio, men who performed what Richbourg later termed "cornfield" blues music. Although some white listeners protested against the music, black audiences responded with enthusiasm and began to write fan letters to Richbourg. Because many of the fans misspelled Richbourg's surname, the disc jockey shortened his on-air moniker to "John R."

By the mid-1950s, John R. began attracting white listeners again — young people. Teenagers listened to the programs featuring blues music and "street talk", some as an act of adolescent rebellion. Richbourg became an influential figure in the fledgling black music trade by featuring ground-breaking R&B and early rock performers like Chuck Berry and Fats Domino on his program. Later Richbourg capitalized on his reputation by becoming a manager to several artists, an occasional record producer, and later entrepreneur in Nashville's booming recording industry. Nashville has long had an international reputation for country music, but it has also always had studio facilities devoted to soul, R&B, and gospel.

Richbourg may have gained his most enduring reputation as a pitchman who used "down-home" phrasing to ad-lib copy for advertisers. One example: Now, friends, I know you got some soul. If you didn't, you wouldn't be listenin' to ol' John R., 'cause I got me some soul. I'll tell you somethin', friends. You can really tell the world you got soul with this brand-new Swinging Soul Medallion, a jewelry pendant.

Richbourg sold exotic or unusual products, such as baby chicks from a Pennsylvania hatchery, family Bibles, hot-rod mufflers, and so on. Most of these were marketed to an African-American clientele. According to Wes Smith's book, The Pied Pipers of Rock 'n' Roll: Radio Deejays of the 50s and 60s (Longstreet Press, 1989), many such products turned out to be defective and/or scams, but few irate customers ever sought legal action against the station or manufacturers. One long-running legitimate sponsor was Ernie's Record Mart, owned by a record label entrepreneur who specialized in recording local Nashville R&B acts.

John R. featured artists such as James Brown, 'Baby' Washington, Otis Redding, and other popular soul acts of the 1960s. Despite the popularity of newer white performers such as Elvis Presley and The Beatles, Richbourg continued to play chiefly African-American artists. He only played mainstream pop when Ernie's Record Mart required him to do so in a commercial hour-long radio show. On that nightly show titled "Ernies Record Parade", John R. would announce, "now this six-record special, the Big Blues special, from Ernie's Record Mart is just two dollars, ninety-eight cents ($2.98) plus shipping and handling, a total of just three ninety-nine ($3.99) from Ernie's Record Mart, 179 3rd Avenue, Nashville, Tennessee. When you order, ask for the Big Blues special or simply say, offer number two; now, let's dig this.." and he would proceed to the next set of offers on the Ernie's Record Parade radio show after playing one or more songs.

== Record production and artist management ==
While still working at WLAC, Richbourg branched out into record production. Beginning in the early 1950s, and with the station's permission and approval, Richbourg began recording gospel and blues acts using WLAC facilities. Initially, he leased these recordings to other labels. In the late 1950s, he set up his own label, Rich Records, which released R&B records and the occasional gospel single. Although nothing released on Rich Records became anything more than a regional hit, during this era Richbourg developed and produced several artists who would go on to have substantial careers in soul music, notably Bobby Hebb.

Rich Records ceased operations by 1960, but Richbourg continued to develop, manage and produce R&B talent, leasing his productions to a variety of labels. He also began using non-WLAC studio facilities, including the Stax Records studio and Chips Moman's American Recording Studio (both in Memphis), as well as various Nashville studios. Around this time, he even became a recording artist himself, releasing two-blues based singles. These singles featured John R., tongue firmly in cheek, half-singing/half-talking his way through the lyrics.

In mid-1965, Fred Foster of Sound Stage 7 recordings struck a deal with Richbourg, and Richbourg became the label's de facto head of A&R. From this point on, Sound Stage 7 was strictly a soul/R&B label, and almost all of the label's output was produced by Richbourg under the aegis of his JR Enterprises company.

Richbourg's biggest commercial success was bringing country-influenced R&B Joe Simon to the label in 1966. Simon had already scored two hits on Vee-Jay Records in 1964/65, but was left without a contract when that label went under. Richbourg became his manager, signed him to Sound Stage 7, and produced 15 singles for Simon on the label between 1966 and 1970—all of which made the US pop and/or R&B charts. Simon's biggest success on the label was his 1969 hit "The Chokin' Kind", which hit #1 on the R&B charts, and #13 pop, and sold over a million copies.

All told, Richbourg produced over 100 singles for Sound Stage 7 between 1965 and 1970, including minor R&B chart hits by Ella Washington and Roscoe Shelton, as well as singles by Roscoe Robinson, Ivory Joe Hunter, Sam Baker, and many other artists.

Beginning in 1971, Richbourg split his production activities between his own newly created labels (Seventy Seven and Sound Plus), while still doing occasional work for Sound Stage 7. As well, he continued to managing and producing Joe Simon, who had moved to Spring Records. As Simon's manager, it was Richbourg who recommended that Simon try working with a series of different producers after 1971, and Simon was rewarded with two more #1 R&B singles: 1972's "Power of Love", and 1975's "Get Down, Get Down (Get on the Floor)".

Other notable artists produced by Richbourg during the 1970s included Jackey Beavers and Ann Sexton. In 1972, John R. signed Charles Smith and Jeff Cooper to his Seventy Seven label and their producer Dewey Vandiver; they gave him the biggest hit on the Seventy Seven label, "Ashes To Ashes", which sold approximately 350,000 records. In 1976 and 1977, Sexton charted on the lower rungs of the R&B charts with two Richbourg productions, including "I'm His Wife (You're Just A Friend)". These would be Richbourg's last hit records as a producer, though he continued recording and producing R&B, soul and gospel acts to the end of his life.

Richbourg retained the rights to virtually all the recordings he produced over the years. Various compilations of Richbourg-produced material have been issued in recent years, much of it concentrating on the discs he produced for the Rich and Sound Stage 7 labels.

== Final years ==
WLAC continued with its block programming (divided program) schedule, featuring news, feature programs, and some country and pop music in the daytime hours (when its signal only reached Middle Tennessee), and the beloved R&B shows after 8 p.m., when the clear-channel signal settled into the atmosphere, enabling the station to be heard throughout much of the North American continent and Caribbean islands, until about 1972. At that time, WLAC owners Life and Casualty Insurance Company of Tennessee brought in for the first time outside management, which instituted a Top 40 format in the daytime. More importantly for Richbourg and the others, though, the new bosses began to pressure them to start including songs from that playlist in their programs. In actuality, this was probably a ploy to nudge Richbourg (and Nobles) into retirement, as the program director obviously saw the nightly Soul/R&B shows as outmoded and inconsistent with the increasingly-fashionable rigid formats that most American radio stations had adopted, or were about to adopt, during that period.

Deciding not to succumb to the dictates of a ratings-driven system (Richbourg and the others sold their spots over the years on a "per inquiry" basis, meaning that they kept a commission for each item sold), he elected to step down on July 28, 1973, after some 28 cumulative years of association with the station. After his retirement, Richbourg developed a reputation of generosity to struggling performers, often going so far as to lend them money without expecting repayment. This would, unfortunately, haunt the disc jockey as he battled health problems in the last years of his life.

== Benefit concert ==
By 1984, Richbourg was dying from lung cancer. His wife, Margaret, and singer Jackey Beavers, a longtime associate, organized a benefit concert to help pay the announcer's steep medical bills. The March 26, 1985 show, held at Nashville's Grand Ole Opry House, included numerous artists who were featured in John R.'s broadcasts: James Brown, B. B. King, the Neville Brothers, Rufus Thomas, The Tams, The Coasters, gospel singer Bobby Jones (who then hosted a local TV program), and Beavers himself. In his book, Wes Smith commented that James Brown gave one of the best performances of his career at the event.

Richbourg survived for about a year, dying at age 75. At his funeral, Ella Washington, a favorite artist of John R., sang gospel numbers, in a tribute to a man who shaped that genre and its secular cousins.

== Aircheck and music recordings ==
After retiring, Richbourg produced cassette tapes featuring reconstructions of his shows, together with the music. Some of these still circulate among traders, as do "bootleg" recordings from the radio broadcasts.

In 2004 the Country Music Hall of Fame released a two-volume set titled Night Train to Nashville-Music City Rhythm & Blues 1945-1970. The set won the Grammy in 2005 in the Best Historical Recording category. It featured recordings which Richbourg and his fellow disc jockeys at WLAC played on their nightly shows from 1945 and 1970. On each CD, one of John R.'s airchecks can be heard. The CD set was released to accompany the Hall of Fame's 2004 exhibit highlighting Nashville's R&B music industry and its intersection with the country music business.

== Famous phrases ==
"You know"--Richbourg said this phrase constantly throughout his programs
"Lord, have mercy, honey, have mercy"--frequent greeting to open the show
"Talk your trash!"--announced over records with suggestive lyrics
"It's Program Ten time"--the name of the part of his show not sponsored by Ernie's Record Mart; origins unknown
"That record is a honey/a gas/a smasheroonie/hittin' and gittin'"--record is climbing up the popularity charts
"That's a good thing"--same meaning as above
"I've got to flap my lips a little here"--meaning he has to interrupt the music for a commercial
"I want you to hear what he/she's talkin' about"
"Ernie's Record Mart, Nashville, Tennessee, and ONLY Nashville, Tennessee, nowhere else in the world! They got them records galore at that store"--reminder to listeners/customers of the store's correct address
"It's all on record"--disclaimer that the show used recordings instead of live in-studio performances; Richbourg used this for many years after the general public caught on to that fact
"Way down South here in the middle of Dixie"--said to introduce show and periodically throughout show, especially after commercial breaks
"Some of that rough, tough, tore up stuff"--intro to songs with "down home" attitude
