= WRVW =

Contemporary hit radio station in Nashville

Coordinates: 36.264°N 86.794°W

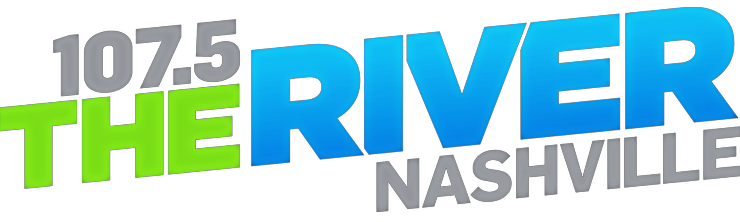
- Lebanon, Tennessee; United States
- Broadcast area: Nashville metropolitan area
- Frequency: 107.5 MHz (HD Radio)
- Branding: 107.5 The River

Programming
- Language: English
- Format: Contemporary hit radio
- Subchannels: HD2: Pop Top 20 (top 20/CHR)
- Affiliations: Premiere Networks

Ownership
- Owner: iHeartMedia; (iHM Licenses, LLC)
- Sister stations: WLAC; WNRQ; WSIX-FM; WUBT

History
- First air date: August 31, 1962
- Former call signs: WCOR-FM (1962–1980); WUSW (1980–1982); WYHY (1982–1996)
- Former frequencies: 107.3 MHz (1962–1982)
- Call sign meaning: River, reference to the Cumberland River

Technical information
- Licensing authority: FCC
- Facility ID: 59824
- Class: C1
- ERP: 46,000 watts
- HAAT: 409 meters (1,342 ft)

Links
- Public license information: Public file; LMS
- Webcast: Listen live (via iHeartRadio)
- Website: 1075theriver.iheart.com

WRVW (107.5 FM) is a radio station licensed to the city of Lebanon, Tennessee, but serving the nearby Nashville market. It is currently branded as 107.5 The River, broadcasting a contemporary hit radio format, and has become something of a heritage station for Top 40 music in middle Tennessee. It is owned by iHeartMedia and operates out of studios in the "Music Row" area. Its transmitter is located just north of downtown Nashville.

== History ==
=== WCOR-FM/WUSW (US107) ===
The station signed on the air on August 31, 1962, as WCOR-FM on 107.3 MHz in Lebanon, Tennessee as the FM sister station to WCOR. It played a country music format for its first 19 years on the air. The station also broadcast some Southern gospel music programming in the middle and late 1970s. By 1980, it branded itself as US107 and changed its callsign to WUSW. This station proved to be short-lived; its absentee owner shut it down along with its AM sister, WCOR, in mid-1981. It was sold, moved to Nashville, and had its frequency changed to 107.5 in order to accommodate a power increase (the FCC ruled out a power increase for 107.3 because of its proximity to WQLT-FM in Florence, Alabama, which is also on 107.3).

=== WYHY (Y107) ===
The station received a complete overhaul when it moved to 107.5 FM in 1982, and went on to become one of Nashville's most successful radio stations. When the move was complete, the callsign was changed to WYHY. Those call letters and the station's official branding Y107 lasted from 1982 until 1996.

Initially under its new incarnation, Y107 broadcast adult contemporary music. Within a few years, however, WYHY became a Top 40/CHR station, competing with two other similar stations, KX 104 FM (WWKX) and 96 Kiss FM (WZKS). Desiring a dose of attitude, craziness, and most of all fun, WYHY hired Coyote McCloud from WWKX in 1984 and launched a new morning show titled Coyote McCloud and The Y107 Morning Zoo Crew or The Y Morning Zoo for short. WYHY quickly became more aggressive in its programming approach and promoted itself as The Outrageous FM. This format, which very edgy for their time but tame by current day standards, was popular among babies kids and most importantly teens as well for its targeted demographic young adults. However, the antics of WYHY did disgust the much older yet more conservative area residents, and WYHY even became the subject of a report on CBS' 48 Hours about "shock radio". During this time, however, WYHY enjoyed enormous popularity across the board, and was regularly Nashville's highest-rated radio station.

By the early 1990s, WYHY's act wore thin as teenage tastes began changing to alternative rock, and WYHY's popularity began to decline. Ratings went down as was the case for most Top 40/CHR stations across America around that time, and WYHY no longer impressed advertisers as a result. After a brief stint with a rock-leaning Top 40/CHR format in April 1993, failed to improve ratings, the station quickly reverted to mainstream contemporary hits. Around this time, the station entered a local marketing agreement with SFX Broadcasting and became a sister station to WSIX-FM. SFX eventually purchased WYHY outright and made some wholesale changes to the station. The "Outrageous FM" era was over as the station again took a more straight forward approach to make it more palatable to advertisers. Despite the changes, the Y107 branding still carried a negative connotation among local businesses due to the sheer number of crazy stunts that WYHY pulled in order to get publicity earlier in its life. WYHY also had its lowest ratings in over 10 years during the mid-1990s. Additionally, Coyote and most of the Y107 airstaff, as well their mascot the Tookie Bird, left the station in early 1995. These factors led management to completely overhaul and rebrand the station.

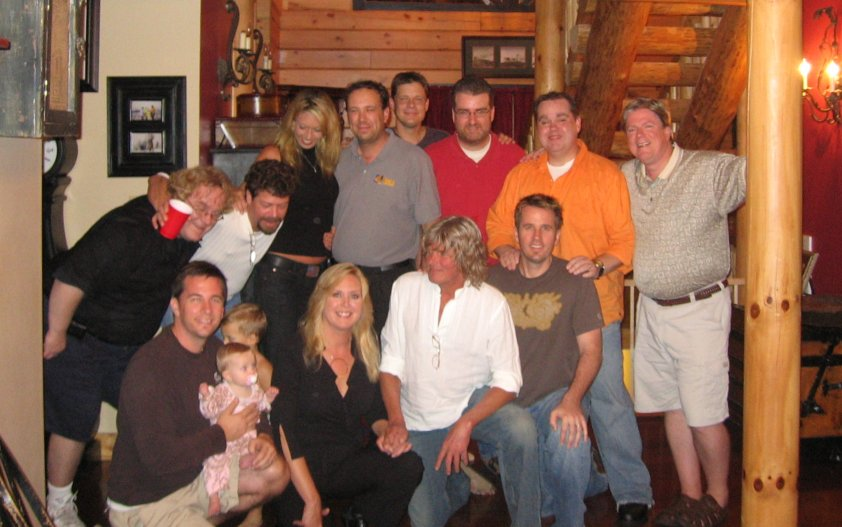
Y107 Staff Reunion - 2006

=== WRVW (107.5 The River) ===
On February 15, 1996, at 3 p.m., air personality Gator Harrison was joined in the studio by pop artist Lisa Loeb, and the station changed its branding to "107.5 The River", and its format to hot adult contemporary. A few days later, the callsign changed to WRVW. Over the next few years, however, the station's format gradually returned to Top 40. The station, to this day, still promotes itself as "The River". After a series of ownership changes, WRVW was acquired by Clear Channel Communications (now iHeartMedia). The station's long-time flagship show was Woody and Jim in the Morning, hosted by Woody Wood and Jim Chandler, who previously worked together at stations in Albany, New York, and San Diego, before departing the station in May 2023. Their co-hosts Ricki Sanchez and Zac Woodward took over mornings on 107.5 The River. Kevin Manno was later added to the show, which was officially branded as Ricki, Zac, and Manno in the Morning. The show quickly became a staple of Nashville morning radio with authentic conversation, caller intensive topics, and interactive games.

=== HD Radio ===
WRVW broadcasts in the HD format:

- HD1 is "The River"
- HD2 is silent

From 2009 until January 1, 2020, WRVW broadcast an HD2 signal. It first began under the branding "Future Radio" until 2012, when the name changed to "Hit Nation Radio". The HD2 signal was discontinued temporarily on January 1, 2020, because of budget constraints at owner iHeartMedia. In mid-2020, WRVW's iHeart sister WLAC began simulcasting on the HD2 signal. In late November 2022, WRVW stopped simulcasting WLAC on the HD2 signal and changed the format to 24/7 Christmas music. It was noticed on January 1, 2023, that the HD2 signal had been taken off the air again.

== Notable former DJs and staff ==
- Marc Chase (PD/OM/Morning Zoo)
- Coyote McCloud Morning Zoo
- J. Karen Thomas (Middays) became an actress, died in 2015
