= WUBT =

- Russellville, Kentucky; United States
- Broadcast area: Nashville, Tennessee; Clarksville, Tennessee–Hopkinsville, Kentucky; Bowling Green, Kentucky
- Frequency: 101.1 MHz (HD Radio)
- Branding: 101.1 The Beat

Programming
- Language: English
- Format: Mainstream Urban
- Subchannels: HD2: "TikTok Radio"
- Affiliations: Premiere Networks

Ownership
- Owner: iHeartMedia; (iHM Licenses, LLC)
- Sister stations: WLAC, WNRQ, WRVW, WSIX-FM

History
- First air date: February 27, 1965; 61 years ago
- Former call signs: WRUS-FM (1965–1974); WAKQ (1974–1984); WBVR (1984–1994); WJCE-FM (1994–1997); WJZC (1997–1999); WZTO (1999–2001)
- Former frequencies: 92.1 MHz (1965–1974)
- Call sign meaning: For "The Beat" format

Technical information
- Licensing authority: FCC
- Facility ID: 34387
- Class: C1
- ERP: 47,000 watts
- HAAT: 393 meters (1,289 ft)
- Transmitter coordinates: 36°31′36″N 86°41′14″W

Links
- Public license information: Public file; LMS
- Webcast: Listen live (via iHeartRadio)
- Website: 1011thebeat.iheart.com

WUBT (101.1 FM, "101.1 The Beat") is an American mainstream urban radio station broadcasting in the Nashville, Tennessee market, under ownership of iHeartMedia. Though the station is licensed to Russellville, Kentucky, its studios are located in Nashville's Music Row district and the transmitter site is in White House, Tennessee.

== History ==
=== The Russellville years ===
On September 16, 1964, the Federal Communications Commission (FCC) authorized South Kentucky Broadcasters, owner of WRUS (610 AM), to build a new FM radio station at 92.1 MHz, to broadcast with 3,000 watts, in Russellville. The station debuted as WRUS-FM February 27, 1965, as a full-time simulcast with its AM sister station.

In 1974, the FCC approved WRUS-FM to increase its effective radiated power to 100,000 watts on 101.1 MHz, giving it much wider regional coverage. When the upgraded facility went into effect on December 10, 1974, the station changed its call sign to WAKQ and adopted a separate Top 40 format. One result of the new format was that WRUS-FM's extensive coverage of local and regional sports was curtailed. With signal coverage available from Bowling Green to Nashville, the station was listened to by some Nashville sports fans, such as those who wanted to hear coverage of Kentucky Wildcats men's basketball.

After a sale of WRUS and WAKQ in 1978 fell through, the stations were purchased five years later by longtime WRUS-WAKQ sports director Lon Sosh, already a 50 percent partner in the ownership group. The next year, citing health reasons, Sosh sold both stations to Keymarket Communications, a consortium headed by Paul Rothfus of Aiken, South Carolina. The new owners retained Sosh as sports broadcaster and proceeded with the erection of a new, 1,000-foot (300 m) tower to increase the FM's coverage area. One bigger change came from the Rothfus group in the summer of 1984 when the station flipped to country as "The Beaver". Along with this change, the station's callsign was changed to WBVR-FM.

Keymarket later became Target Communications, headed by Donald Alt, who also served as a vice president of the Keymarket group. In 1990, the Amaturo Group purchased WBVR for $6 million (half of that in cash and half in assumption of liabilities), splitting it from WRUS for a time. Meanwhile, Target purchased WCBZ (96.7 FM) in Bowling Green in 1991. Keymarket then bought back WRUS and WBVR in early 1994 for a nominal value of $10.

=== Move to Nashville; jazz format ===
In July 1994, the Beaver brand and format moved to WMJM (the former WCBZ), which became the new WBVR-FM, and to a second station, WVVR in Hopkinsville. Keymarket had simultaneously acquired WLAC and WLAC-FM in Nashville, and the Beaver move freed up the 101.1 facility to gear itself toward Nashville as R&B-formatted WJCE-FM, "The Juice". Keymarket was then purchased by River City Broadcasting in 1995, and Sinclair Broadcast Group then acquired River City in 1996.

The "Juice" format was dropped in December 1996, with the station stunting with Christmas music for the holiday season before flipping to smooth jazz as "Jazzy 101.1" at the start of 1997. With this switch, the station's callsign was changed to WJZC. Sinclair then sold the three Nashville radio stations it had acquired from River City and to SFX Broadcasting in 1997.

=== Contemporary Christian format ===
After AMFM Inc. acquired SFX, it flipped WJZC from its satellite-delivered jazz to a contemporary Christian music outlet, branded as "The One" and with the call sign WZTO, on October 1, 1999.

=== Hip-hop format ===
On October 12, 2001, the station's call letters were changed to the current WUBT as the station adopted its present mainstream urban format, using the moniker "101.1 The Beat Jamz" (revised to "101.1 The Beat" in 2014), as the CCM niche in the market was over-served by non-commercial operations, with few advertisers as WZTO. It was one of the first stations owned by Clear Channel/iHeart to take the now-common branding of "The Beat". WUBT has served as the market's home for the Steve Harvey Morning Show since July 2007.

== See also ==
- List of Nashville media
