= Griffin Brothers =

American R&B band

The Griffin Brothers
- Also known as: The Griffin Brothers Orchestra
- Origin: Norfolk, Virginia, US
- Genres: Rhythm and blues
- Years active: 1940s–1954
- Labels: Ekko, Dot
- Past members: Jimmy Griffin "Buddy" Griffin; Wilbur Dyer; Virgil Wilson; Jimmy Reeves; Emmett "Nab" Shields; Noble "Thin Man" Watts; Wilbur Little; Belton Evans

The Griffin Brothers were an American rhythm and blues band from Norfolk, Virginia, sometimes credited on record as the Griffin Brothers Orchestra. They made successful recordings with singer Margie Day, and had a no.1 hit on the Billboard R&B chart in 1951 with "Weepin' and Cryin'", featuring Tommy Brown.

== Biography ==
The group was formed by brothers Jimmy (born James Rudolph Griffin, Norfolk, Virginia, November 26, 1921–November 14, 2000) and "Buddy" Griffin (born Edward Elijah Griffin, Elizabeth City, North Carolina, October 5, 1919–October 22, 1981).

By 1920, the family lived in Norfolk, Virginia. Both Jimmy and Buddy studied music at the Juilliard School. Jimmy played trombone, and Buddy played piano. The band was completed by Wilbur Dyer (alto saxophone), Virgil Wilson (tenor saxophone), Jimmy Reeves (bass), and Emmett "Nab" Shields (drums). In the late 1940s they played local clubs in Washington, D.C., as well as Virginia and North Carolina, and added a singer, Margie Day. In early 1950 the band recorded as back-up to Roy Brown on the session for DeLuxe Records that yielded his no.1 R&B hit, "Hard Luck Blues".

Local music promoter Lillian Clairborne won them a recording contract with the newly formed Dot Records, established by Randy Wood. Their first record, credited to Margie Day with the Griffin Brothers Orchestra, "Street Walkin' Daddy" / "Riffin' With Griffin", became a no.7 hit on the Billboard R&B chart in late 1950, with sales reportedly reaching over 15 thousand a week. The follow-up record, "Little Red Rooster", not directly related to the Willie Dixon song but drawing on the same folk traditions, reached no.5 on the R&B chart in early 1951. Wilson, Reeves and Shields were replaced by Noble "Thin Man" Watts (tenor sax), Wilbur Little (bass), and Belton Evans (drums). The Griffin Brothers toured widely in 1951 and 1952 with Amos Milburn, Paul Williams and others, and continued to record both with Margie Day, and with singer Tommy Brown. They had two R&B hits with Brown, "Tra-La-La" which reached no.7, and "Weepin' and Cryin'" which reached no.1 in January 1952.

Day left the band for a solo career in late 1952, and was replaced on some appearances by Claudia Swann (née Swanson). The Griffin Brothers continued to tour with such artistes as The Orioles, Chuck Willis, and Faye Adams, and recorded for the Dot label until early 1954 when their contract ended and Jimmy Griffin left to form his own band. He later recorded briefly and unsuccessfully for Atco Records in New York.

Buddy Griffin signed for Chess Records in Chicago, and had a minor R&B hit in 1955, "I Wanna Hug Ya, Kiss Ya, Squeeze Ya", with Claudia Swann, credited as Buddy & Claudia with the Buddy Griffin Orchestra. The band members were "Silly Willie" Wilson (trombone), Chuck Reeves (alto and baritone saxes), Earl Swanson (tenor sax), Lawrence Burgan (bass), and Courtney Brooks (drums). Later recordings were credited to Buddy Griffin and Claudia Swann, and some featured The Moonglows as backing vocalists. Buddy Griffin and his wife, Kaye worked in real estate in New York for thirty years before his death in 1981.
