= Vanderbilt Sports Network =

Radio network in Nashville, Tennessee, U.S.

Vanderbilt IMG Sports Network
- Type: Radio network
- Country: United States
- Availability: various AM and FM radio stations
- Headquarters: Nashville, Tennessee
- Area: Middle Tennessee; South Central and Western Kentucky
- Owner: IMG College; Vanderbilt University
- Official website: VUCommodores All Access (online game broadcasts)

The Vanderbilt IMG Sports Network, also known as the Commodore Radio Network, is the sports radio network for the Vanderbilt Commodores, the athletic programs of Vanderbilt University. Headquartered in Nashville, Tennessee, the network consists of 10 radio stations in Middle Tennessee, and one in Kentucky.

There is no television division of this network, but Vanderbilt Commodores fans worldwide can listen to coaches shows and game events on Vanderbilt Access at the athletic department's website. IMG College has been operating the Vanderbilt Sports network since 2000.

Since 2012, WLAC, known on air as "NewsRadio 1510," is the Nashville area home (and flagship station) of Vanderbilt sports programming. Because that station is a 50,000 clear-channel AM station, Vanderbilt's night-time games can be heard in most of the eastern United States and parts of southeastern Canada. WSM, the other clear-channel station in Nashville, previously served as the network's flagship from the 1950s through 2012. WLAC took over as flagship station two years after losing rival Vol Network's broadcasts of Tennessee Volunteers basketball and football games to WGFX-FM.

== Radio affiliates ==
=== Current affiliates ===
==== Tennessee ====
City of license	Callsign	Frequency	Notes
Nashville	WLAC	AM 1510	Also serves the Clarksville, Tennessee and Bowling Green, Kentucky radio markets by default. Any of VU's games that take place at night can be heard in most of the eastern U.S. and southeastern Canada due to the station's 50,000 watt clear-channel status. Flagship station for the network's Football, Men's Basketball broadcasts, and the coaches shows.
Brentwood (Nashville)	WNSR	AM 560	Flagship station of broadcasts of women's basketball and baseball.
Brentwood (Nashville)	W240CA	FM 95.9	FM translator of WNSR/Brentwood
Chattanooga	WALV-FM-HD2	FM-HD 106.9-2	Football and men's basketball only; can only be heard on HD Radio tuners.
Fayetteville	WEKR	AM 1240	Airs football and men's basketball
Lewisburg	WJJM	AM 1490	Airs football and men's basketball
Manchester	WMSR	AM 1320	Airs football and men's basketball
Memphis	WMPS	AM 1210	Airs football and men's basketball
Smyrna/Murfreesboro, Tennessee	W300DO	FM 107.9	FM translator of WNSR/Brentwood
Tullahoma	WDUC	FM 93.9	Football and men's basketball only; Also serves Fayetteville, McMinnville, Manchester and Shelbyville

==== Kentucky ====
City of license	Callsign	Frequency	Notes
Drakesboro (Central City)	WRFM	FM 103.9	FM repeater of WNSR/Brentwood, Tennessee

=== Former affiliates ===
- Ashland City, TN -- WQSV AM 790
- Benton, Kentucky -- WCBL-FM
- Chattanooga, TN -- WDOD (defunct)
- Clarksville, TN -- WJZM AM 1400
- Gallatin, TN (Nashville) -- WGFX FM 104.5
- Nashville -- WSM AM 650 (195?-2012)
- West Memphis, Arkansas (Memphis, TN) -- KWAM
- Winchester, TN -- WCDT
