= WLYJ (FM) =

Coordinates: 32°03′51″N 88°43′27″W

- Quitman, Mississippi; United States
- Broadcast area: Meridian, Mississippi
- Frequency: 98.9 MHz
- Branding: Joy Christian Radio

Programming
- Format: Gospel music

Ownership
- Owner: Joy Christian Ministries

History
- First air date: July 31, 1981
- Former call signs: WYKK (1981–1982); WYKK-FM (1982–2005); WLKO (2005–2012); WMSO (2012–2018)

Technical information
- Licensing authority: FCC
- Facility ID: 54324
- Class: C3
- ERP: 25,000 watts
- HAAT: 96 meters (315 ft)

Links
- Public license information: Public file; LMS
- Webcast: Listen live
- Website: https://joychristianradio.com/

WLYJ (98.9 MHz) is a radio station licensed to Quitman, Mississippi, broadcasting a Gospel music format. It is owned by Joy Christian Ministries.

== History ==
The station began broadcasting on July 31, 1981, and held the call sign WYKK. It aired an oldies format and originally broadcast at 98.3 MHz. By 1986, the station had switched to a country music format, and was part of a simulcast with AM 1500 WBFN. In 1991, the station's frequency was changed to 98.9 MHz. The station was branded "K 98".

In 2005, the station was sold to Educational Media Foundation for $500,000. Its call sign was changed to WLKO and it became an affiliate of K-Love, airing a contemporary Christian format. On February 20, 2012, the station's call sign was changed to WMSO, and it became an Air1 affiliate.

On September 3, 2018, the station adopted a Gospel music format as an affiliate of Joy Christian Radio. On December 21, 2018, the station's call sign was changed to WLYJ. Effective May 13, 2019, Educational Media Foundation traded WLYJ to Joy Christian Ministries in exchange for 88.5 WKTH in Tullahoma, Tennessee.

== Simulcasts ==
WLYJ's programming is simulcast on WJGS 91.5 in Norwood, Georgia and WLYG 88.3 in Jasper, Georgia.

Call sign	Frequency	City of license	FID	ERP (W)	HAAT	Class	FCC info
WJGS	91.5 FM	Norwood, Georgia	172173	3,000	70 m (230 ft)	A	LMS
WLYG	88.3 FM	Jasper, Georgia	90341	200	1 m (3 ft)	A	LMS
