= WLVU (FM) =

Coordinates: 36.297°N 86.753°W

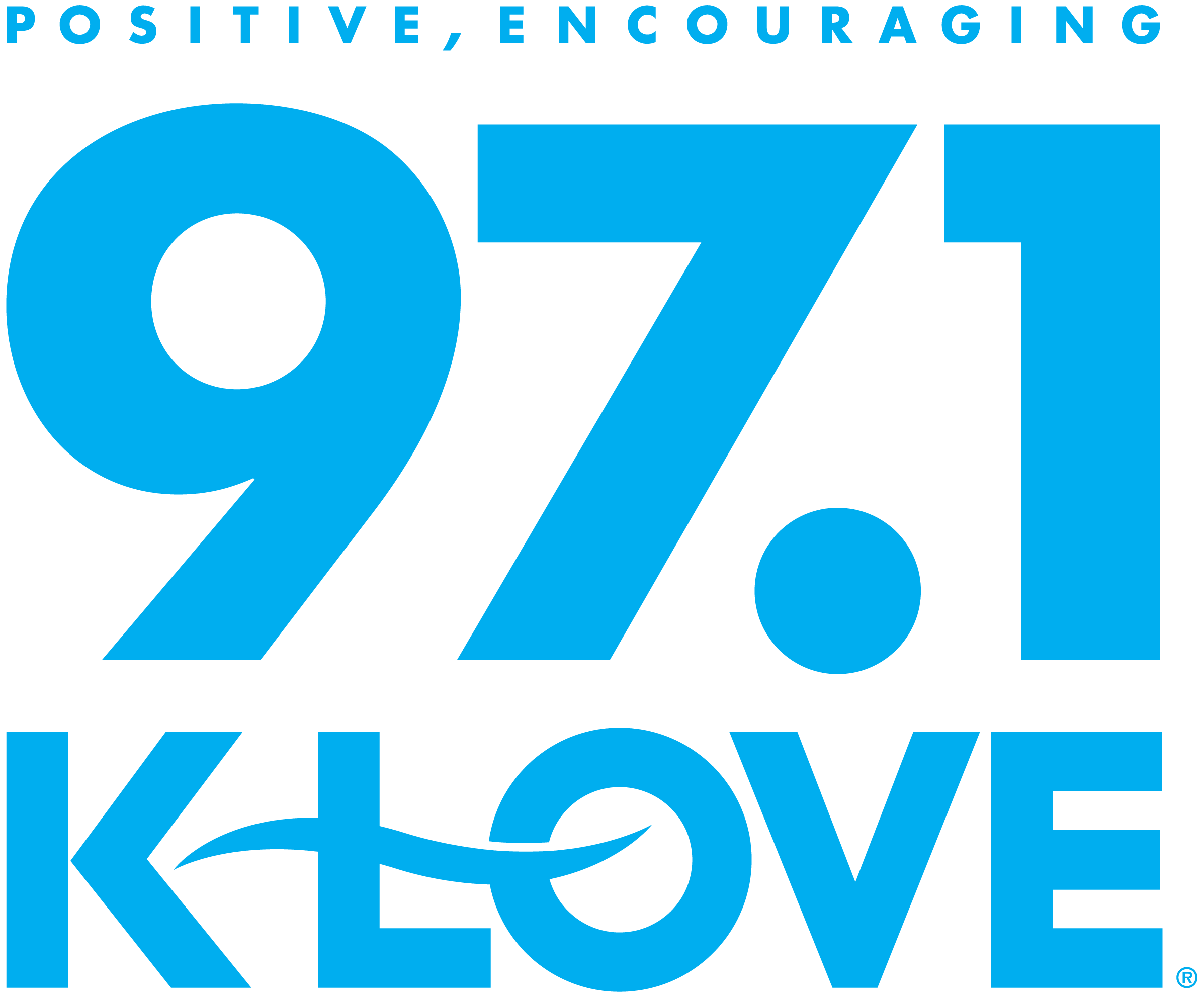
- Belle Meade, Tennessee; United States
- Broadcast area: Nashville, Tennessee
- Frequency: 97.1 MHz (HD Radio)
- Branding: K-Love

Programming
- Format: Christian adult contemporary
- Subchannels: HD2: Air1 (Contemporary worship music) (WAIV simulcast); HD3: K-Love 90s (Christian 90s hits)

Ownership
- Owner: Educational Media Foundation
- Sister stations: WAIV, WKTH, WLFM, WLVN

History
- First air date: 2000; 26 years ago
- Former call signs: WRQQ (1999–2012)
- Call sign meaning: Interpolation of K-Love

Technical information
- Licensing authority: FCC
- Facility ID: 26689
- Class: C2
- ERP: 44,370 watts
- HAAT: 157.6 meters
- Translators: HD3: 100.3 W262CN (Hendersonville); HD2: 92.5 W223BV (Brentwood)

Links
- Public license information: Public file; LMS
- Webcast: Listen Live
- Website: klove.com

WLVU (97.1 MHz) is an FM radio station licensed to the city of Belle Meade, Tennessee, but serving the Nashville market as a whole. It is currently branded as K-LOVE, repeating a satellite-delivered contemporary Christian format. The station is owned by Educational Media Foundation and is one of the two flagship of the K-Love brands based in nearby Franklin, Tennessee. (The other Station being WLVN in Woodbury, Tennessee) It is Nashville's most recent full-power FM station to take the air.

== Ownership ==
The original construction permit was granted in 1999 to Mid-TN Broadcasters, LLC, a consortium of former applicants for the permit. In 2000, control of Mid-TN Broadcasters, LLC was transferred from the original owners to the privately owned Dickey Brothers Broadcasting in exchange for WVOL(AM) and cash (BTCH-19991223ABT). Dickey Brothers later brought the station to air using the call letters WRQQ, at which point it became a sister station to WNPL (106.7 FM) and WQQK (92.1 FM).

In 2002, Dickey Brothers Broadcasting sold the three-station Nashville cluster to Cumulus Media, a publicly traded company in which members of the Dickey family served (at that time) as major shareholders, directors, and executives. In 2003, the station moved to a new state-of-the-art studio and welcomed WSM-FM and WWTN as sister stations after Cumulus purchased them from Gaylord Entertainment Company.

On September 16, 2011, WRQQ and sister station WNFN were placed into an independent trust (Volt Radio, LLC) while Cumulus sought a buyer. The move was forced by FCC ownership limits following Cumulus' acquisition of Citadel Broadcasting, which resulted locally in WKDF and WGFX joining the Cumulus cluster. The FCC, as of 2011, allows a single company to own a maximum of five FM stations and two AM stations in any given market. To meet these guidelines in Nashville, Cumulus was forced to spin off two of its seven FM stations, and the company chose WRQQ and WNFN, traditionally its two lowest-performing stations.

On November 14, 2011, Cumulus announced it was removing WRQQ from the Volt Radio trust, replacing it with WQQK. Following the sale of WRQQ, Cumulus reacquired WQQK from the trust.

On July 10, 2012, Cumulus announced it would be selling WRQQ to Educational Media Foundation, as part of a larger deal that resulted in a facility swap in Mobile, Alabama. On July 15, 2012, EMF took control of the station, began airing K-LOVE programming, and changed the call letters to WLVU. Cumulus operated the station on behalf of EMF until the sale was complete on April 16, 2013.

As of August 2014, EMF owns and operates the station outright.

== History ==
=== Stunting ===
Once the station's transmitter was up and running, WRQQ, preparing for its official launch, began stunting with jukebox sound effects and clips from songs from all genres of music with the promise that "an all-new radio station is coming to 97.1 FM". This stunt was broadcast for a few days in early 2000.

=== Star 97 ===
WRQQ officially signed on the air in early 2000 (its license was granted on November 24, 1999) as "Star 97", a station broadcasting hot adult contemporary music. In 2002, the station shifted to an all-1980s music format but kept its "Star 97" name. The station would eventually migrate back to hot AC in 2003, again keeping the "Star 97" brand. Notable air talent on Star 97 included Hollywood Hendrix, Billy Brown, Steve Wall, Scott Chase, Jack Shell, JT Daniels, Mark Allen, and Scotty O'Brien.

Though the name stayed the same through the various changes, the station used four different taglines/slogans:

- A Better Variety of Music!
- The Best of the 80s, 90s, and Today!
- The Best 80s and More!
- Real Music Variety!

=== Oldies 97.1 ===
On May 13, 2005, Star 97 began running liners to listen at 5PM for a "major announcement". At 5 PM that day, after playing Closing Time by Semisonic, the station made a drastic change by flipping its format to oldies, as Oldies 97.1, with the first song on Oldies 97.1 being Listen to the Music by The Doobie Brothers. The day before, 96.3 WMAK (now WCJK), which had broadcast the oldies format in Nashville for over a decade, suddenly changed formats to "Jack FM". Sensing a void, Cumulus management reacted by changing the underperforming Star 97 to the newly abandoned oldies format.

The new format, put together literally overnight, mimicked the template that WMAK had set forth. The logo and jingle package were nearly identical to the ones WMAK used, the same slogan ("Good Times & Great Oldies") was incorporated, and the major components of WMAK's airstaff, including Nashville radio legends Coyote McCloud and Cathy Martindale, were hired.

=== 97.1 WRQQ ===
On September 1, 2006, WRQQ transitioned its format from oldies to classic hits and abandoned the "Oldies" moniker as well. The station was reimaged, and for the first time (aside from legal identifications) used the call letters in its on-air imaging. The station became known as "97.1 WRQQ, Rock N' Roll Hits of the ’60s and ’70s". While the staff initially remained intact, Coyote and Cathy were released in November, and the station replaced them with The Bob & Tom Show during morning drive in December. In doing so, Cumulus secured the rights to Bob & Tom from WBUZ ("102.9 The Buzz"), which had been the duo's Nashville affiliate since 1997. Midday air personality Bobby Knight was also released as part of the change. As the station matured, its music selection became more and more male-oriented, and the station began to compete more directly with WNRQ ("105.9 The Rock"), after being initially positioned to compete with WCJK ("96.3 Jack-FM").

=== Classic Hits 97.1/97.1 The Tower ===
As its music selection was further focused, the station shifted its branding in February 2007 to "Classic Hits 97.1", all but abandoning the call letters in its on-air imaging. Its logo style was left the same, but the wordmarks were altered to reflect the change. The station was later rebranded itself as "97.1 The Tower" in September 2007, and featured a different logo. The classic hits format remained the same.

=== 97-1 RQQ ===
On March 21, 2008, at 10 a.m. CDT, WRQQ underwent another format change. The station began running liners the day before that pointed to a "major announcement" that would be made on the 21st following The Bob & Tom Show. At 10 a.m., the station played a couple of instrumental versions of popular classic rock songs. A montage featuring sound bites from prominent rock artists was then played, after which the station launched its new format and branding. The new format was mainstream rock, and branded as "97-1 RQQ." The first song played on "97-1 RQQ" was Rock! Rock! (Till You Drop) by Def Leppard. The format overall found "RQQ" positioning itself as "Nashville's Rock Station," playing Classic Rock artists such as Led Zeppelin and Aerosmith to more current artist like Nickelback and Green Day. Additionally, the station would play new songs from established artists not getting much airplay, such as Mudcrutch's (Tom Petty's first band) "Scare Easy", and "Saints Of Los Angeles" by Mötley Crüe. This new version of WRQQ featured new talents Karen Keeley doing middays and Mac in the afternoon. The Bob and Tom show remained in place. On May 18, 2009, WRQQ further focused its rock format into an adult album alternative format.

=== Classic Hits 97.1 RQQ ===
On July 16, 2010, WRQQ changed its format to classic hits once again, branded as "Classic Hits 97.1 RQQ". Along with this change, WRQQ became the flagship station for Vanderbilt University football and men's basketball.

=== K-LOVE ===
At the stroke of midnight on July 15, 2012, WRQQ began airing the national K-LOVE radio feed without explanation, following the implementation of a local marketing agreement between Cumulus and Educational Media Foundation. Simultaneously, the call letters were changed to WLVU. The LMA was in place while the sale of the station from Cumulus to EMF was pending. The sale was consummated effective April 16, 2013, as the station was reclassified as non-commercial educational.

== HD Radio ==
HD1: K-LOVE (Christian Contemporary)
HD2: Air1 (Contemporary worship music) (WAIV simulcast)
HD3: K-LOVE Eras (Christian Classic Hits)

== See also ==
- List of Nashville media
