= WNRQ =

Classic rock radio station in Nashville, Tennessee, United States

- Nashville, Tennessee; United States
- Broadcast area: Greater Nashville
- Frequency: 105.9 MHz (HD Radio)
- Branding: 105-9 The Rock

Programming
- Format: Classic rock
- Subchannels: HD2: Black Information Network

Ownership
- Owner: iHeartMedia, Inc.; (iHM Licenses, LLC)
- Sister stations: WLAC, WRVW, WSIX-FM, WUBT

History
- First air date: September 10, 1953
- Former call signs: WSOK-FM (1953–1955); WHCY (1955–1957); WFMB (1957–1964); WLAC-FM (1964–1978); WKQB (1978–1981); WJYN (1981–1983); WLAC-FM (1983–1998)
- Call sign meaning: Nashville's Rock

Technical information
- Licensing authority: FCC
- Facility ID: 34392
- Class: C
- ERP: 100,000 watts
- HAAT: 376 meters (1,234 ft)
- Transmitter coordinates: 36.036°N 86.849°W
- Translator: HD2: 97.5 W248BQ (Nashville)

Links
- Public license information: Public file; LMS
- Webcast: Listen live (via iHeartRadio); Listen live (HD2)
- Website: 1059therock.iheart.com HD2: nashville.binnews.com

WNRQ (105.9 FM) is a commercial radio station licensed to Nashville, Tennessee, United States, serving northern middle Tennessee and southern central Kentucky. Owned by iHeartMedia, it airs a classic rock format, with studios in Nashville's Music Row district.

WNRQ's transmitter is sited on Johnson Chapel Hill Road West in Brentwood, Tennessee, a Nashville suburb. WNRQ broadcasts in HD Radio: the HD2 digital subchannel carries the Black Information Network, which feeds FM translator W248BQ at 97.5 MHz.

== History ==
The station signed on the air on September 10, 1953. Its original call sign was WSOK-FM. The station was owned by Cal Young, who happened to own 1470 WSOK-AM, according to FCC records. Cal Young sold 1470 WSOK-AM to Robert Roundsaville in 1957 and became what is known today as WVOL. In that same year, Cal Young sold WSOK-FM (at that time the call sign was WHCY) to Great Southern Broadcasting Company, and the new call sign became WFMB. In 1964, WFMB was sold again to WLAC, Inc. WFMB switched to WLAC-FM, becoming the sister station to WLAC 1510 AM. WLAC-FM had an easy listening format, airing quarter-hour sweeps of mostly instrumental cover versions of popular adult music, along with Hollywood and Broadway show tunes.

On June 1, 1978, WLAC-FM switched to album oriented rock (AOR), as "Rock 106," WKQB.

On December 24, 1980, at 12 noon, the album oriented rock (AOR) format came to an end and a format change to "The Joy of Nashville," WJYN, the latter reflecting a former easy listening format. In spring 1983, the call sign was changed back to WLAC-FM and went to an Adult Contemporary Format.

In 1998, Dick Broadcasting, owner of WGFX, and SFX Broadcasting, the then-owner of WLAC-FM, agreed to trade the intellectual property of the stations. The trade, to have taken place February 2, 1998, would have moved WLAC-FM to 104.5 FM, and moved WGFX's classic rock format to 105.9 under SFX ownership. However, when the agreement fell apart, SFX decided to go ahead with launching a classic rock format anyway, and flipped WLAC-FM to WNRQ on January 30.

== Current format ==
The current format features harder-edged classic rock. Most of the station's playlist first hit the Nashville-area airwaves on the now-country-formatted WKDF during the 1970s and 1980s, as well as WKQB, "Rock 106" (from 1978 to 1981).

It was also Nashville's station for the syndicated John Boy and Billy morning show, heard on numerous Southern stations with the same format as WNRQ. The station stopped airing John Boy and Billy in the spring of 2020. It later had a local wake-up program, "The Josh Innes Show". The show also aired on WEGR in Memphis and WLLZ in Detroit.

The current morning show is hosted by Rock Radio veteran Jeremy "Loper" Loper and long time local co-host Tim Battle, under the name "The Loper Show." Loper was lured to Nashville's WNRQ from Columbus, Ohio's Active Rock WRKZ-FM 99.7 The Blitz where he hosted "Loper and Randi in The Morning." Some of the DJs for WNRQ are voicetracked from other iHeartRadio stations. In afternoon drive time, the station airs Big Rig from WXTB Tampa.

== HD Radio ==
WNRQ broadcasts two HD Radio channels; WNRQ-HD1 simulcasts the analog station, while WNRQ-HD2 serves as the Nashville affiliate of the Black Information Network, and is the originating channel for translator station W248BQ (97.5 FM).

=== WNRQ-HD2 ===
WNRQ-HD2 was at first a Clear Channel Communications-provided channel called "Vinyl Vineyard", but due to technical difficulties, the simulcast of sister station 1510 WLAC was moved to the HD2 signal. On August 25, 2014, the WLAC simulcast was replaced by an alternative rock format, branded "Alt 98.3" (reflecting its simulcast on translator station W252CM) made its debut, replacing the WLAC simulcast. On September 2, 2016, the format changed to classic country, branded as "The Big Legend 98.3"; this format served as a brand extension of sister station WSIX-FM. On March 31, 2017, WNRQ-HD2 returned to alternative rock, branded as "Alt 97.5" (reflecting its simulcast on translator W248BQ), featuring the same airstaff as "Alt 98.3" and broadcasts of Nashville Sounds baseball; origination of the "Big Legend 98.3" classic country format moved to WSIX-HD2. On December 16, 2018, WNRQ-HD2 changed its format to gospel music, branded as "97.5 Hallelujah FM".

On June 29, 2020, fifteen iHeart stations in markets with large African American populations, including W248BQ/WNRQ-HD2, began stunting with African American speeches, interspersed with messages such as "Our Voices Will Be Heard" and "Our side of the story is about to be told," with a new format slated to launch on June 30. That day, W248BQ/WNRQ-HD2, along with the other fourteen stations, became the launch stations for the Black Information Network, an African American-oriented all-news network.

=== WNRQ-HD3 ===
WNRQ-HD3 was a simulcast of sister station WLAC until 2013, when the simulcast moved to WNRQ-HD2. WNRQ-HD3 was then removed; it resumed broadcasting in 2016 carrying Air1, feeding translator station W223BV (92.5 FM). WNRQ-HD3 was again discontinued on January 1, 2020, when Educational Media Foundation, owner of Air1 and W223BV, transferred origination of the translator's programming to the HD2 channel of WLVU.
