= The Counts =

The Counts were a doo-wop group from Indianapolis, Indiana, formed in the 1950s. The group included Chester Brown, James Lee, Robert Penick, Robert Wesley, and Robert Young. The Counts were also known as the Original Counts, as they performed with their original lineup until the death of Robert Young, in 2001. They were thought to be the longest-running doo wop group made up entirely of their original membership.

Young wrote most of the Counts' songs, including "Hot Tamale" and "Darling Dear". "Darling Dear" (Dot 44-1188, b/w "I Need You Always") made it to No. 6 on the R&B singles chart.

All of the members attended Crispus Attucks High School, in Indianapolis, where they originally formed as the Five Diamonds. They changed their name in 1954 when they signed with Dot Records. The Counts recorded at Wilkins Studio, possibly with Jimmy Coe (or, perhaps, with a Jimmy Cole), and were at times backed live by Wes Montgomery.
