= Herman Grizzard =

- Born: 14 Jul 1900; Nashville, Tennessee, United States
- Died: 25 Apr 1971; Nashville, Tennessee, United States
- Occupation: radio Disc Jockey

Herman Grizzard (1900-1971) was an American radio disc jockey who attained fame from the 1940s through the 1970s for playing rhythm and blues and other music on Nashville radio station WLAC. Grizzard was one host of a nightly series of four programs on the station. He shared the block of programs with "John R." Richbourg, Bill "Hoss" Allen, and Gene Nobles. Together they were known as the "50,000 Watt Quartet".

Grizzard began his affiliation with the historic clear-channel AM station during its early years in the 1930s. Up to the mid-1940s, he hosted a variety of different programs. By 1950, Grizzard joined the station's move to a nighttime format of R&B, soul music, and gospel music. The station developed the programming to sell advertising to African-American-oriented products and businesses.

For many years, Grizzard's program was sponsored by Buckley's, a local Nashville record store. It was located on Church Street near downtown and the Vanderbilt University campus. Most of Grizzard's program was devoted to promoting the store's stock, often sold in packages of three to six 78 or 45 RPM discs. Buckley's, along with Randy's Record Shop in nearby Gallatin (sponsor of Nobles' program), and Ernie's Record Mart (sponsor of Richbourg's show), conducted large mail-order businesses. They provided many customers the chance to buy music that, prior to the late 1950s, was not readily available to many Euro-Americans, at least not from "respectable" outlets. Buckley's inventory consisted chiefly of recordings by local artists on Nashville-based labels. Grizzard featured these songs liberally on his program. After Grizzard's death, Buckley's sponsored Bill "Hoss" Allen's program for several years. The store closed in the early 1970s.

Grizzard was also an early baseball broadcaster: He announced play-by-play action of minor-league teams in Nashville.

For most of his show's run, Grizzard used the Avery Parrish tune "After Hours" — performed by Parrish with the accompaniment of the Erskine Hawkins Orchestra — as an opening theme.

== Bibliography ==
- Smith, Wes (1989), The Pied Pipers of Rock 'n' Roll: Radio Deejays of the 50s and 60s, Marietta, Georgia: Longstreet Press
