= Frank E. Grizzard Jr. =

American historian

Frank E. Grizzard Jr., is an American historian, writer, and documentary editor. He was born in 1954 in Emporia, Virginia, graduating from Greensville County High School in 1971. He earned B.A. degrees in history and religious studies from the Virginia Commonwealth University, and M.A. and Ph.D. degrees in history from the University of Virginia. His doctoral dissertation, Documentary History of the Construction of the Buildings at the University of Virginia, 1817–1828, consisting of a lengthy narrative and more than 1,750 documents chronicling the construction of Thomas Jefferson's architectural masterpiece, the Academical Village, became the first electronic dissertation to be placed online when it was completed in 1996. The dissertation was tagged in the Standard Generalized Markup Language (SGML) while Grizzard was a fellow at the University of Virginia's Institute for Advanced Technologies in the Humanities (IATH).

Grizzard spent fifteen years at The Papers of George Washington editorial project at the University of Virginia, editing volumes in the Revolutionary War Series and overseeing the project's computer initiatives. While at the Washington Papers, he was responsible for placing online the 39-volume edition of The Writings of George Washington from the Original Manuscript Sources 1745–1799, edited between 1931 and 1944 by John C. Fitzpatrick, the Assistant Chief of the Manuscripts Division of the Library of Congress. (Fitzpatrick's Writings of Washington, justly celebrated as the "first systematic effort to transcribe and publish the entirety of Washington’s personal papers," is being superseded by the more comprehensive Papers of George Washington.)

Grizzard served on the board of directors of the Albemarle Charlottesville Historical Society (1999–2007) and as the Society's vice-president (2002–2003), president (2003–2005), and past-president (2005–2007). In 2004 Grizzard joined the board of directors of the Prism, a Virginia nonprofit music association that for 40 years hosted acoustic Americana and World Music at its intimate Coffeehouse in Charlottesville. For several years Grizzard hosted radio programs at WTJU in Charlottesville, including "The Old Home Place" (a traditional and gospel Bluegrass show), and "Just 'Nuther" (a 3-hour artist showcase of various genres).

In addition to his own writings and work on historical documentary editions, Grizzard has written two encyclopedias, edited two history journals, and has been responsible for bringing massive collections of historical documents to the internet. The Association for Documentary Editing awarded Grizzard its Distinguished Service Award, in 1999, for his contributions to the Association's computer initiatives.

Grizzard left the University of Virginia in 2005 to set up the Lee Family Digital Archive (LFDA), a long-term project aimed at creating an online edition of the papers of the prominent Lee family of Virginia. The LFDA was affiliated with Washington and Lee University before moving to Stratford Hall, which now administers the site. As Director of the LFDA—which is producing a historical edition covering about 350 years of American history—Grizzard oversaw all aspects of the project, including the search for Lee-related documents; the transcription, annotation, and electronic markup of documents; and project fundraising.

At both the University of Virginia and at Washington and Lee University, Grizzard coordinated lecture series bringing together more than three dozen prominent historians and writers to speak about various historical subjects, including George Washington, Thomas Jefferson, Colonial Jamestown, and Robert E. Lee.

== Works ==
- Documentary History of the Construction of the Buildings at the University of Virginia, 1817–1828 (PhD dissertation; The University of Virginia E-Text Website, 1996)
- “A Perilous and Grievous Burden’: The Dilemma of the Antislavery Slaveholder in Virginia During the Early National Period: A Case Study of General John Hartwell Cocke of Bremo (M.A. Thesis, 1989)
- "Why I Have 500 Copies of the Same Book", Biblio: The Magazine for Collectors of Books, Manuscripts, and Ephemera (vol. 1, Nov.–Dec. 1996)
- “Stevenson’s ‘Wide and Starry Sky’,” Virginia Quarterly Review (vol. 73, Winter 1997)
- “Supply Problems Plagued the Continental Army from the Start,” The American Revolution, National Discussions of Our Revolutionary Origins (Companion Website for the Television Series Liberty! 1997)
- "Come on In, the Door’s Open: The Who, Where and Whys of Visitors to Our Websites" (Association for Documentary Editing Website, 1997)
- "George Washington and Nineteenth-Century Culture", Encyclopedia of the United States in the Nineteenth Century (Paul Finkelman, ed., Scribners, 2001)
- George Washington: A Biographical Companion (ABC-CLIO, 2002)
- The Historic Charlottesville Tour Book (ed., Albemarle County Historical Society, 2002)
- Review of Richard Schickel's Woody Allen: A Life in Film, in Virginia Quarterly Review (vol. 81, Spring 2004)
- George! A Guide to All Things Washington (Mariner Publishing, 2005)
- The Ways of Providence: Religion and George Washington (Mariner Publishing, 2005)
- John Milton Mackie’s "The Administration of Washington" (ed., Mariner Publishing, 2006)
- "La vicenda di Michele e Giacomo Raggi tra le carte d'archivio di Thomas Jefferson", in Luisa Passeggia's Carrara e il mercato della scultura: Arte, gusto e cultura materiale in Italia, Europa e Stati Uniti tra XVIII e XIX secolo (Fondazione Cassa di Risparmio di Carrara, 2005)
- The Jamestown Colony: An Encyclopedia, with D. Boyd Smith (ABC-CLIO, 2007)
- Essays in History, (ed.) Corcoran Department of History, University of Virginia 1990–93
- The Magazine of Albemarle County History, (co-ed.), 1994–96; (ed.) 1996–2003
- “‘Three Grand & Interesting Objects’: Margaret Bayard Smith’s 1828 Visit to Monticello, the University of Virginia, and Montpelier,” The Magazine of Albemarle County History (vol. 51, 1993)
- “A Young Scholar’s Glimpses of the Charlottesville Academy and the University in August 1819,” The Magazine of Albemarle County History (vol. 54, 1996)
- “‘To Exercise a Sound Discretion’: The University of Virginia and Its First Lawsuit” (M.A. thesis); University of Virginia E-Text Center Website, 2003
- "Ten Things We Should Know about George Washington," commentary, Richmond-Times Dispatch (22 February 2010)
- The Papers of George Washington, Revolutionary War Series, vol. 6, co-editor (1994)
- The Papers of George Washington, Revolutionary War Series, vol. 8, editor (1998)
- The Papers of George Washington, Revolutionary War Series, vol. 10, editor (2000)
- The Papers of George Washington, Revolutionary War Series, vol. 12, co-editor (2002)
- The Papers of George Washington, Financial Series (letterpress and digital editor)
- The Scroll, (ed.) History Department, Virginia Commonwealth University, 1985–87

Electronic Editions

- Electronic Edition of John C. Fitzpatrick's "Writings of Washington" (preface and ed., University of Virginia E-Text Center Website, 2002)
- Electronic Edition of Lambeth and Manning's Thomas Jefferson as an Architect and a Designer of Landscapes (ed., University of Virginia E-Text Center Website, 2003)
- Electronic Edition of James Parton's The Presidential Election of 1800 (ed., University of Virginia E-Text Center Website, 2003)
- Electronic Edition of Thomas Jefferson's Autobiography, 1743–1790 (ed., University of Virginia E-Text Center Website, 2003)
- Electronic Edition of Edward S. Ellis's Life of Thomas Jefferson (ed., University of Virginia E-Text Center Website, 2003)
- Electronic Edition of Allen Johnson's Jefferson and His Colleagues: A Chronicle of the Virginia Dynasty (ed., University of Virginia E-Text Center Website, 2003)
- Electronic Edition of E. D. White's Life of Thomas Jefferson (ed., University of Virginia E-Text Center Website, 2003)

Top Ten George Washington Lists

- Top Legends and Myths
- Top Ten Websites
- Top Ten Must Have Books
- 20 More Must Have Books

== Awards ==
- Association for Documentary Editing, Distinguished Service Award, 2000
- Graduate Fellow, Institute for Advanced Technology in the Humanities, 1995–96
- Book Collecting Prize, John Bunyan's Pilgrim's Progress, Bibliographical Society of the University of Virginia, 1994
