= WLAC =

Radio station in Nashville, Tennessee

Nashville, Tennessee; United States
- Broadcast area: Nashville metropolitan area
- Frequency: 1510 kHz
- Branding: Talkradio 98.3 and 1510

Programming
- Format: Talk radio
- Affiliations: Compass Media Networks; Fox News Radio; NBC News Radio; Premiere Networks; The Weather Channel; WZTV; Vanderbilt IMG Sports Network

Ownership
- Owner: iHeartMedia, Inc.; (iHM Licenses, LLC)
- Sister stations: WNRQ; WRVW; WSIX-FM; WUBT

History
- First air date: November 24, 1926
- Former frequencies: 1330 kHz (1926–1928); 1490 kHz (1928–1930); 1470 kHz (1930–1941)
- Call sign meaning: Life And Casualty Insurance Company (former owner)

Technical information
- Licensing authority: FCC
- Facility ID: 34391
- Class: A
- Power: 50,000 watts
- Transmitter coordinates: 36°16′19″N 86°45′28″W
- Translator: 98.3 W252CM (Nashville) (relays WSIX-HD2)
- Repeater: 97.9 WSIX-HD2 (Nashville)

Links
- Public license information: Public file; LMS
- Webcast: Listen live (via iHeartRadio)
- Website: wlac.iheart.com

WLAC (1510 AM) branded "TalkRadio 98.3 and 1510 WLAC", is a commercial radio station in Nashville, Tennessee. Owned by iHeartMedia, it broadcasts a talk radio format. The station's studios are in Nashville's Music Row district.

WLAC is a clear-channel station, it operates around the clock at 50,000 watts, the highest power authorized for AM stations in the United States. A single tower radiates the transmitter's full power during the day to most of Middle Tennessee. At night, it uses a directional pattern that limits its signal toward the west to originally protect KGA in Spokane (which has since downgraded its night signal) and to the northeast to protect WMEX in Boston. It has a three-tower array in the city's Northside neighborhood. WLAC broadcasts an HD Radio signal using the in-band on-channel standard. Programming is simulcast over a digital subchannel of 97.9 WSIX-FM and on FM translator W252CM at 98.3 FM.

== Programming ==
WLAC carries nationally syndicated conservative talk shows, including The Glenn Beck Radio Program, The Sean Hannity Show, The Ramsey Show with Dave Ramsey, The Michael Berry Show, The Dr. Asa Show with Asa Andrew, Coast to Coast AM with George Noory and This Morning, America's First News with Gordon Deal. In 2021, WLAC became the flagship station for The Clay Travis and Buck Sexton Show. WLAC has also been the flagship station of Your Morning Show with Michael DelGiorno since 2023.

Weekend shows include Rich DiMuro on Tech, The Weekend with Michael Brown and The Ben Ferguson Show. WLAC carries Vanderbilt University Commodores football and basketball games.

== History ==
=== Early years ===
WLAC has traditionally traced its founding to November 24, 1926. That was the day the station made its first broadcast under the WLAC call sign. However, Federal Communications Commission (FCC) records list WLAC's "Date first licensed" as September 11, 1925, reflecting the initial license date for station WDAD, which was consolidated with WLAC in 1927.

WDAD was first licensed in September 1925 to "Dad's Auto Accessories (Inc.)" at 160 Eighth Avenue North in Nashville. It initially transmitted on 1330 kHz. It made its debut broadcast on September 14. WLAC was first authorized in November 1926, owned by the Life & Casualty Insurance Co., with its call letters chosen as an acronym of the owner's name. Studios were located on the fifth floor of the Life and Casualty building in downtown Nashville. WLAC initially operated on a timesharing basis with WDAD on 1330 kHz.

In mid-1927 Dad's Auto and Life & Casualty formed a partnership for joint operation of their combined stations, as WDAD-WLAC. The following November Life & Casualty purchased WDAD's interest in the combined stations, and announced that, effective November 21, 1927, the "call letters WDAD will be discontinued and the station operated only under the call letters WLAC in the future". The November 30, 1928, issue of the Radio Service Bulletin therefore instructed its readers that, for the current WDAD-WLAC station list entry, to "strike-out call WDAD, as Dad's Auto Accessories (Inc.) is no longer joint licensee".

On November 11, 1928, under the provisions of the Federal Radio Commission's General Order 40, WLAC moved to 1490 kHz, operating with 5,000 watts on a timesharing basis with the Waldrum Drug Co.'s WBAW. The next year WBAW's call letters were changed to WTNT, after that station had been taken over by The Tennessean newspaper. In early 1930 WLAC and WTNT were reassigned from 1490 kHz to 1470 kHz. (WCKY, on 1480 kHz in Covington, Kentucky, had been encountering mutual interference over much of Kentucky and Tennessee with WLAC, and was moved to 1490 kHz at the same time).

On December 16, 1930, WTNT was taken over by Life & Casualty. The next day WTNT, which previously had been allotted 1/3rd time on the shared frequency, ceased broadcasting, allowing WLAC to again operate a fulltime schedule, and WTNT was subsequently deleted.

In 1928, WLAC became Nashville's CBS Radio Network affiliate. Its main competitor, WSM, was affiliated with the NBC Red Network. In the early years of the station, WLAC provided local news, studio-orchestra musical features (accompanied by an in-studio pipe organ), farm reports, and some educational programming. Its main competitor in that era, WSM, became known as the radio station where country music essentially developed and became a national phenomenon. When country music became a big business in the late 1940s, WLAC added early-morning and Saturday-afternoon country shows in an attempt to steal some of WSM's thunder. Otherwise, the station prided itself as a pillar of the community and placed emphasis on general full-service programs.

In 1941, with the implementation of the North American Regional Broadcasting Agreement (NARBA), WLAC moved to a "Clear Channel" assignment of 1510 kHz, and received permission to increase its power to 50,000 watts. WLAC thus became the second clear-channel station in Tennessee, after WSM. While WSM was a Class I-A station, using a non-directional antenna at all times, WLAC shared its clear channel assignment with KGA in Spokane, Washington. Since WLAC and KGA were designated as co-equal Class I-B stations, both were required to use a directional antenna at night to mutually protect each other's signals. KGA has since given up its clear-channel status, but WLAC is still required to conform its nighttime signal. Even with this restriction, it reaches parts of 28 states and three Canadian provinces at night, including most of the eastern half of the continent. Even at 50,000 watts, WLAC provides only secondary coverage of several inner-ring suburbs, such as Murfreesboro. In contrast, WSM's lower frequency allows it to be heard at city-grade strength in all of Middle Tennessee, with secondary coverage of five states. WLAC's simulcasts on HD Radio serve in part to alleviate this shortfall.

=== Late night rhythm and blues ===
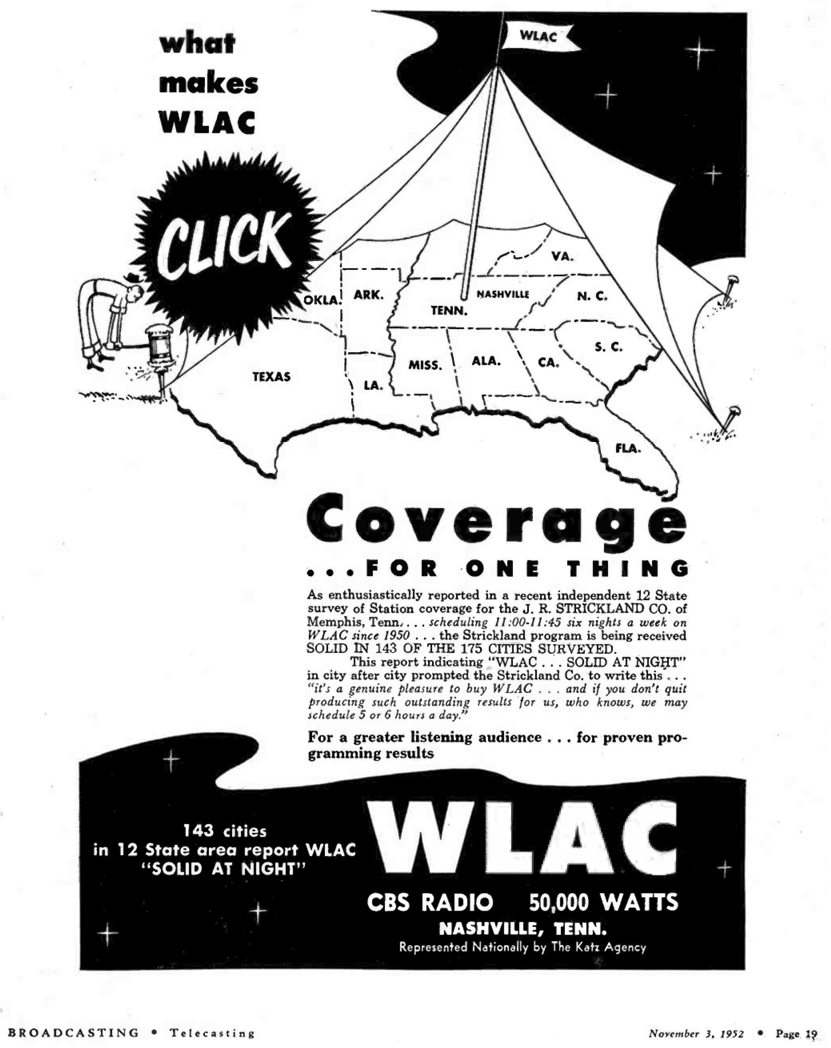
1952 advertisement promoting station's nighttime coverage.

In the 1950s, 1960s and 1970s, WLAC was legendary for its quartet of nighttime rhythm and blues shows hosted by Gene Nobles, "John R." (John Richbourg), Herman Grizzard, and Bill "Hossman" (or simply "Hoss") Allen. Thanks to the station's clear channel designation, the signal reached most of the Northeast and Midwestern United States. WLAC described itself as the nighttime station for half the nation with African-American listeners, especially in the Deep South as the intended audience of the programs. Further, several foreign countries, particularly islands in the Caribbean and southern Canada, were within range of the station's nighttime signal; the music heard on WLAC played a notable role in the development of ska music as a result. WLAC was also popular with some young white teenagers. Radio historians believe that the nightly "Rhythm and blues" WLAC shows, in part, laid the foundational audience for the rock and roll phenomenon that began in the late 1950s.

Nobles began the move, in 1946, to play what were considered at the time "race" records, a euphemism intended to deter supposedly respectable audiences. But he and the others reached large numbers of African-American listeners in places like the Mississippi Delta, the Carolina Lowcountry, Louisiana, Chicago, and Detroit, people whom practically no other radio stations were serving. Gradually phasing in artists like Amos Milburn, Chuck Berry, and Fats Domino in the early 1950s to supplement the big-band artists of the era such as Tommy Dorsey and Glenn Miller, the WLAC announcers presided over the development of what became "rhythm and blues" music. They did this mainly to attract advertisers who serviced the African-American community, such as hair-care products like Royal Crown Hair Pomade or chicken hatcheries, which packaged baby scrub roosters and other undesirable stock in large quantities for sale. The disc jockeys developed a reputation for colorfully pitching those products on air; some product slogans lent themselves to sexually suggestive double entendres, which only increased the announcers' popularity among teen listeners. The deejays conducted the advertising sales on a "per inquiry", or commission, basis, meaning that the station did not rely on traditional ratings to gauge the programs' successes.

WLAC sales manager E.G. Blackman sought to hire the nation's first African-American news radio broadcaster employed by a major, white-owned radio station, Don Whitehead. Whitehead, a graduate of Tennessee State University, began his career shortly after the April 1968 assassination of Martin Luther King Jr. Whitehead started in the nighttime slot, announcing the news at the top of the hour. He traveled around WLAC's listening area to promote the historically black colleges and universities and played a big role in increasing enrollment of African Americans attending college.

Performers of later years, such as Johnny Winter, and the Allman brothers, Duane and Gregg, have credited the station as being a valuable source of inspiration for their artistic development. According to Levon Helm, Robbie Robertson (both members of The Band, a 1970s roots rock group) listened to WLAC at night while in Toronto. As a teenager, Robertson would stay up all night to hear blues from deejay John R. A strange irony about the phenomenon was unknown to most listeners of that time: all four disc jockeys were in fact middle-aged white men, not African Americans, as their Southern, gravelly, drawling voices suggested. Richbourg and Allen in particular made frequent use of colloquialisms most familiar to their audience, thereby convincing many that they were "soul brothers," as a common expression of that day.

Other regular sponsors of the four shows included Randy's Record Shop of Gallatin, Tennessee, Ernie's Record Mart, and Buckley's Record Shop, the latter two of Nashville, all of which conducted mail-order business selling the recordings featured on the shows, and had affiliations with record companies in Middle Tennessee.

Each deejay's program lasted from one to two hours per evening Mondays through Saturdays, occupying roughly (with adjustments over the years) the period between 8 p.m. and 2 a.m. Central Time. On Sunday nights, Richbourg or Allen hosted programs featuring black gospel recordings. Richbourg and Allen took credit for helping to start or boost the careers of artists like James Brown, Ray Charles, B. B. King, Otis Redding, Jackie Wilson, Aretha Franklin; Nobles helped the likes of Little Richard.

Other than the famous late-night shows, WLAC followed a fairly conventional news/talk (relatively middle-of-the-road politically, unlike today [see below]) and middle of the road music format in the daytime until the early 1970s, when new management attempted to program a Top 40 format, competing against ratings leader WMAK (1300 AM) for the Nashville-area teenage audience. This move, in particular, is believed to have prompted Richbourg and Nobles to retire, as they had no interest in conforming to a predetermined, pop-oriented playlist arranged by an outside consultant.

In addition to this, most markets in WLAC's night-time coverage area now had black-oriented stations of their own, most of which attracted the demographic groups that formerly listened to Allen, Richbourg, and Nobles' shows as their only source for R&B and soul music (as it was known by the 1960s). Furthermore, musical tastes among younger listeners in particular changed as the 1970s approached, as white youth began to prefer the hard rock that initially modeled itself on the blues (especially on the upstart FM stations that began playing it), while African-American kids gravitated toward the grittier edges of funk or early disco and, eventually, rap. This made the Motown, Muscle Shoals, and Memphis sounds favored by the DJ trio (Grizzard died in 1971) seem passé, and the hosts' audience, unsurprisingly, began to age, something that advertisers, focusing by then on youth rather ethnicity, almost always react adversely against. Changing tastes also brought about the end to record labels such as Stax, which were major suppliers of music heard on the R&B/Soul shows.

To replace the retiring jocks, the station recruited young Spider Harrison, a native New Yorker who at the time was an afternoon urban air personality and program director at WTLC-FM in Indianapolis. Harrison steered the nighttime format into a blend of soul and rock, in an attempt to target an entire new generation of young night-time listeners throughout the country. However, WLAC struggled for most of the 1970s to obtain Arbitron ratings improvements from local listeners, despite frequent promotional events staged throughout the Nashville area. Only Hoss Allen kept his program, which he converted to an urban gospel format, by moving it to the overnight/early morning hours.

In 1964, WLAC added an FM adjunct by purchasing WFMB on 105.9 MHz, changing its call sign to WLAC-FM. A decade earlier, in 1954, it had started Nashville's third television station, WLAC-TV (Channel 5); owing to WLAC's affiliation with the CBS Radio Network, WLAC-TV took the CBS TV affiliation from WSIX-TV (channel 8, now WKRN-TV on channel 2). WLAC-TV was sold to the Hobby Family of Houston in 1975, changing the call sign to WTVF, and is now owned by the E. W. Scripps Company.

=== Talk radio era ===
On February 7, 1979, the station, under the direction of Jim Ward, station manager, and Robert H. Ruark, veteran talk show host and newly appointed program manager, pulled the plug on its unsuccessful run as a Top 40 outlet and changed formats to news and talk in daytime hours, making it one of the first stations in the Southern U.S. to adopt that format for at least a preponderance of its programming lineup. The new schedule, (as reported in The Nashville Tennessean newspaper's "Sunday Showcase") included news coverage weekdays from 6 to 9:30 am, Noon to 1 pm, and 4:30 to 7 pm, when the regular nighttime "ethnic music" programming began. The mid-morning and mid-afternoon talk show programming featured debate-type discussions with local or national figures via telephone and listeners calling in to ask questions or join in the discussions. Weekends followed the same basic format, and on Saturday mornings, a guest host was featured. Roger Frazier and J. Paul Robinson debuted the new programming as featured newscasters and talk show hosts.

Despite the new programming, Hoss Allen was able to keep his early-morning gospel music program and continued with it until his 1993 retirement from the station. Eventually, it became the only music featured on WLAC by the early 1980s.

In 1986, WLAC pioneered sports talk in Middle Tennessee, when it began a two-hour-long afternoon drive-time sports show hosted by record company executive and sports fan Rick Baumgartner, along with former WSMV-TV sportscaster Charlie McAlexander, who resigned from WSMV specifically to take the WLAC job. Also, former WSM, WSMV and WKRN-TV personality Teddy Bart launched his critically acclaimed "Roundtable" interview program on WLAC's morning schedule in 1985. The show, which featured newsmakers in Tennessee politics, later moved to several other Nashville stations before discontinuing production in 2005. Bart is now deceased.

Much in the same manner as in years past when network programming gave way at sunset to R&B music for a different audience, for many years after WLAC changed to news and talk, the station abruptly switched, without any warning to unacquainted listeners, at 8 pm. Central Time (when the clear-channel signal settled into place) to a Christian talk and teaching format. The nighttime line-up included paid broadcasts of many evangelical, fundamentalist, and Pentecostal preachers, seeking donations for their ministries, with the news/talk format resuming at daybreak (after the Hoss Allen show). This practice was discontinued shortly after the station's purchase by AMFM, Inc. in 1999. AMFM was later merged into San Antonio-based Clear Channel Communications, which became iHeartMedia in 2014.

WLAC's longtime logo used from the late 1990s up until 2017.

For many years, WLAC was the Nashville home of the University of Tennessee Volunteers, bringing Vols football and men's basketball to much of North America at night. In 2010, the Vol Network moved its Nashville affiliation to WGFX-FM. Since 2012, WLAC serves as the flagship of the Vanderbilt Commodores IMG Sports Network; the station has carried Vanderbilt games at various times in past years as well.

On September 21, 2018, translator station W252CM dropped its classic country format, branded as The Big Legend, and began to simulcast WLAC on FM, with the station's branding changing to TalkRadio 98.3. Along with the translator, WLAC is also simulcast on WSIX-FM-HD2.

In 2018, the station announced the addition of a new morning show, The Tennessee Star Report with Steve Gill, beginning September 24. Gill ran into legal problems the following year; according to The Tennessean, Gill failed to pay $170,000 in child support, resulting in his arrest. He spent more than a week in the Williamson County Jail and resigned his position with the conservative news website "The Tennessee Star."

WLAC, since 2021, has become the flagship of the EIB Network, featuring The Clay Travis and Buck Sexton Show.

== See also ==
- List of Nashville media
- Nathanial Dowd Gaston Williams, a pioneering Tennessee African-American disc jockey
- Joseph Deighton Gibson Jr., a disc jockey who used mannerisms similar to Allen, Grizzard, Richbourg, and Nobles
