= WKTH =

- Tullahoma, Tennessee; United States
- Frequency: 88.5 MHz
- Branding: K-Love

Programming
- Format: Christian contemporary
- Network: K-Love

Ownership
- Owner: Educational Media Foundation
- Sister stations: WLVU, WLFM

History
- First air date: 1998
- Former call signs: WAUT (1998–2012); WLYJ (2012–2018)

Technical information
- Licensing authority: FCC
- Facility ID: 84363
- Class: A
- ERP: 1,900 watts
- HAAT: 53.3 meters (175 ft)
- Transmitter coordinates: 35°20′26.1″N 86°11′03″W

Links
- Public license information: Public file; LMS
- Website: klove.com

WKTH (88.5 FM) is a K-Love affiliated radio station licensed to Tullahoma, Tennessee, United States. It is owned by Educational Media Foundation. The station broadcasts with an effective radiated power output of 1,900 watts as authorized by the Federal Communications Commission.

== History ==
The station began broadcasting in 1998, and held the call sign WAUT. The station was originally owned by the American Family Association and was an affiliate of American Family Radio. On March 1, 2012, the station's call sign was changed to WLYJ. In 2012, American Family Association donated the station to Joy Christian Communications. The station aired a Gospel music format and was flagship station of the Joy Christian Radio network. Effective May 13, 2019, Joy Christian Ministries traded WKTH to Educational Media Foundation, in exchange for 98.9 FM WLYJ in Quitman, Mississippi.
