= Mass media in Nashville, Tennessee =

Nashville, Tennessee is the 29th largest media market in the United States with roughly 966,000 homes, 0.8% of the country's media market.

== Print ==
=== Daily newspapers ===
- The Tennessean

=== Weekly newspapers ===
- La Campana - Spanish newspaper
- NashVegas Insider
- Nashville Business Journal
- The Nashville Pride
- Nashville Scene

=== Monthly newspapers ===
- The Contributor

=== Monthly magazines ===
- Nashville Music Guide
- NATIVE

=== Defunct newspapers ===
- All The Rage — entertainment and events
- The City Paper (general news and opinion; originally Monday-Friday, later twice weekly, and then weekly; published November 1, 2000 — August 9, 2013)
- The Daily American, (1876–1894) and The Nashville American (1894–September 25, 1910); merged into The Tennessean
- The Labor Advocate (weekly 1902–1939)
- Nashville Banner (ceased publication February 20, 1998)
- Nashville Business in Review (1995–1997); later published as In Review (1997–1999) — alternative weekly (later biweekly) tabloid
- Nashville Globe and Independent — African-American weekly (ceased publication in July 1960)
- Nashville Times (weekly November 11, 1937–May 26, 1938, then daily; ceased publication July 28, 1940)

=== Defunct magazines ===
- Advantage, The Nashville Business Magazine (monthly, 1978–1989, published by Advantage, Inc.)
- Aluminum Magazine (monthly, June 1999 to August 1999)
- Nashville (monthly, January 1963–April 1970)
- Nashville (monthly, approx. 1978–1990, published by Advantage Publications Inc.)
- Nashville Life (bimonthly, 1994–1999, published by Eagle Communications Inc.)
- Tag Magazine (monthly)

== Online news and blogs ==
- NashvillePost.com
- AntiochTenn.com
- StyleBlueprint

== Television ==
The following full-power and low-power television stations are receivable in the Nashville metropolitan area:

=== Full-power ===
- 2 WKRN-TV Nashville (ABC)
- 4 WSMV-TV Nashville (NBC, Tennessee Valley Sports & Entertainment Network on 4.2)
- 5 WTVF Nashville (CBS, Ion Television on DT2)
- 8 WNPT Nashville (PBS)
- 17 WZTV Nashville (Fox, The CW on 17.2)
- 28 WNPX-TV Franklin (Independent)
- 30 WUXP-TV Nashville (Independent with MyNetworkTV)
- 39 WHTN Murfreesboro (CTN)**
- 44 WJFB Lebanon (MeTV)**
- 50 WPGD-TV Hendersonville (TBN)
- 58 WNAB Nashville (Roar)

=== Low-power ===
- 6 WRTN-LP Alexandria (Daystar)**
- 15 WTNX-LD Nashville (Telemundo)
- 20 WNPX-LD Nashville (Daystar)**
- 26 WNTU-LD Nashville (Daystar)**
- 31 WJDE-CD Nashville
- 34 WJNK-LD Nashville (TBN)
- 35 WCTZ-LD Bowling Green, KY
- 40 WKUW-LD White House
- 42 WLLC-LD Nashville (Univision, UniMás on 42.2)

=== Cable ===
Cable stations based in Nashville include Country Music Television and NRB Network. The Nashville Network was also based in Nashville until it closed in 2000.

== Radio ==
Nashville is ranked by Arbitron as the 44th-largest radio market in the United States and its territories.

Its stations, licensed to Nashville and surrounding cities, include:

=== AM ===
- 560 WNSR Brentwood (Sports)
- 650 WSM Nashville (Country)**
- 710 WYJV Smyrna (Moody Radio)*
- 760 WENO Nashville (Conservative talk)
- 810 WMGC Murfreesboro (Spanish variety)
- 830 WQZQ Goodlettsville (Classic hits)
- 880 WMDB Nashville (Regional Mexican)
- 900 WKDA Lebanon (Big band)
- 950 WAKM Franklin (Country)
- 980 WYFN Nashville (Bible Broadcasting Network)*
- 1010 WHIN Gallatin (Country)
- 1160 WCRT Donelson (Bott Radio Network)*
- 1200 WFCN Nashville (Moody Radio)*
- 1240 WNVL Nashville (Regional Mexican)
- 1300 WNQM Nashville (Christian)
- 1360 WNAH Nashville (Urban gospel)
- 1380 WHEW Franklin (Spanish variety)
- 1430 WYGI Madison (Oldies-WHPY-FM simulcast)
- 1460 WGNS Murfreesboro (Talk)
- 1470 WVOL Berry Hill (Urban adult contemporary)
- 1490 WCOR Lebanon (Country-WANT simulcast)
- 1510 WLAC Nashville (Conservative talk)**

=== FM ===
- 88.1 WFSK-FM Nashville (Jazz/Fisk University)*
- 88.3 WMTS-FM Murfreesboro (College/Middle Tennessee State University)*
- 88.5 WVCP Gallatin (College/Volunteer State Community College)*
- 88.7 WAYM Spring Hill (WayFM Network)*
- 89.1 WECV Nashville (Bott Radio Network)*
- 89.5 WMOT Murfreesboro (Americana/Middle Tennessee State University)*
- 90.3 WPLN-FM Nashville (NPR and talk)*
- 91.1 WNXP Nashville (Adult album alternative)*
- 92.1 WQQK Goodlettsville (Urban adult contemporary)
- 92.9 WJXA Nashville (Adult contemporary)
- 93.7 WFRW Kingston Springs (Family Radio)
- 94.1 WAIV Smyrna (Air1)
- 94.5 WHPY-FM Bellevue (Oldies)
- 95.5 WSM-FM Nashville (Country)
- 96.3 WCJK Murfreesboro (Adult hits/Jack FM)
- 97.1 WLVU Belle Meade (K-Love)*
- 97.9 WSIX-FM Nashville (Country)
- 98.9 WANT Lebanon (Country)
- 99.7 WWTN Hendersonville (Talk radio)
- 100.1 WRLT Franklin (Adult album alternative)
- 101.1 WUBT Russellville, KY (Mainstream urban)
- 102.5 WPRT-FM Pegram (Sports/ESPN)
- 102.9 WBUZ La Vergne (Active/alternative rock)
- 103.3 WKDF Nashville (Country)
- 104.5 WGFX Gallatin (Sports radio/FSR)
- 104.9 WLVN Woodbury (K-Love)*
- 105.1 WJZM Waverly (Adult hits)
- 105.9 WNRQ Nashville (Classic rock)
- 106.7 WNFN Franklin (Classic country)
- 107.1 WRFN-LP Pasquo (Community radio)*
- 107.5 WRVW Nashville (Contemporary hit radio)

== See also ==
- Tennessee media
  - List of newspapers in Tennessee
  - List of radio stations in Tennessee
  - List of television stations in Tennessee
  - Media of cities in Tennessee: Chattanooga, Knoxville, Memphis, Murfreesboro

== Bibliography ==
- "History of the Nashville Press". Nashville City and Business Directory, For 1860–61. Vol. 5. Nashville, Tennessee: L.P. Williams & Co. 1860. p. 90. hdl:2027/hvd.hn4gyr.
- D.E. Sumner (1991). "Clash over Race: Tennessee Governor Ellington versus CBS, 1960". Journalism Quarterly. 68 (3): 541–547. doi:10.1177/107769909106800326. S2CID 143058804.
