= WMRO =

Radio station in Gallatin, Tennessee (1963–2019)

- Gallatin, Tennessee; United States
- Frequency: 1560 kHz
- Branding: Magic 1560

Programming
- Format: Adult contemporary

Ownership
- Owner: Timothy Scott Bailey; (Classic Broadcasting, Inc.)

History
- First air date: April 1, 1963
- Last air date: August 31, 2019
- Former call signs: WSTH (1962, CP); WLVN (1962–1964); WWGM (1964–1993)

Technical information
- Facility ID: 11749
- Class: D
- Power: 1,000 watts (day); 3 watts (night)
- Transmitter coordinates: 36°24′3.2″N 86°27′3″W

WMRO (1560 AM, "Magic 1560") was a radio station licensed to and serving Gallatin, Tennessee. The station was locally owned by Scott, Leslie, and Sandra Bailey of Classic Broadcasting, Inc. The station's studios and transmitter facilities were located a half–mile north of downtown Gallatin.

== Programming ==
The station was last branded as "Magic 1560" and aired the satellite-fed adult contemporary music format from Westwood One. On Sundays, church services, religious programs, Sunday afternoon gospel music, and local programming focusing on Gallatin area were aired. On September 12, 2014, the station changed its format from hot adult contemporary to a mainstream adult contemporary format.

== History ==
The Second Thursday Corporation received the construction permit for a new AM radio station in Nashville in 1962. Originally assigned the call letters WSTH, WLVN signed on April 1, 1963, as "The Nashville Sound", focusing entirely on recordings made in the city. WLVN relaunched as full-service WWGM on September 25, 1964. The station broadcast with 10,000 watts during the daytime only, with a three tower directional pattern. Originally, the WWGM call sign stood for the "Wonderful World of Good Music". Later on after a format change, the call sign stood for the "Wonderful World of Gospel Music".

After nearly four years of operation as WWGM, the station filed for bankruptcy in 1968. Crawford Broadcasting bought the station at auction for $105,000 later that year—though it did not become the licensee until 1970—and said that if the equipment manufacturers that WWGM owed money would not make arrangements with it, the group would build a new facility. Second Thursday also held a construction permit for an FM station on 92.9 MHz, sold separately, that was finally built in 1976 as WZEZ, now WJXA.

In September 1986, Dean A. Crawford Broadcasting Co. reached an agreement to sell WWGM to Lindsey Christian Broadcasting Company, consisting of Faye and her husband Rudy Lindsey. The deal was approved by the Federal Communications Commission (FCC) on November 25, 1986, and the transaction was consummated on December 16, 1986. Throughout this era, the station was identified as a religious-oriented radio station, playing "traditional Christian music and programs". In April 1993, Lindsey Christian Broadcasting Company reached an agreement to sell WWGM's license to Classic Broadcasting, Inc. The contract agreement to transfer the WWGM License was signed by Lindsey Christian Broadcasting's vice president, Faye Lindsey and Classic Broadcasting's President, William E. "Bill" Bailey. The deal was approved by the FCC on October 25, 1993, and the transaction was consummated on October 28, 1993.

Classic Broadcasting, owned by William E. "Bill" Bailey, Sandra Bailey, and Scott Bailey, had the FCC change the call letters to WMRO on November 9, 1993, and a construction permit was fIled to relocate the station to Gallatin, Tennessee. The new site was the former site of WAMG (now WYXE). William "Bill" and Sandra Bailey are the parents of Scott Bailey. The WMRO call sign had previously belonged to a station in Aurora, Illinois, for the previous 30 years;

On Saturday, February 19, 1994, WMRO signed on at 8 a.m. and began playing an oldies music format. Part-owner Scott Bailey signed on the station, and was the first DJ to hit the air that morning. All three were owners of WMRO. Former WQQK program director Jay Dubard gave WMRO its branding, Magic 1560.

On April 1, 2006, the station flipped to a hot adult contemporary music format because of the area's changing demographics as a Nashville bedroom community and another station in the county switching to an oldies format. The last oldies song played was "Wooly Bully" from Sam the Sham and the Pharaohs. The first song played with WMRO's new hot adult contemporary format was "Let Love In" by the Goo Goo Dolls. Scott Bailey made the format change that day at 5 p.m. Despite the format change, WMRO retained the Magic 1560 branding, but adding a new slogan, "Today's Best Hits".

In December 2006, majority control of Classic Broadcasting was transferred from William E. "Bill" Bailey to Timothy Scott Bailey. On February 7, 2007, William E. "Bill" Bailey passed away. However, with Scott Bailey as president and general manager, Leslie Bailey, (Scott's wife) as vice president, and Sandra Bailey as secretary, the three pushed on to keep WMRO on the air, and the station gained popularity in Gallatin and Sumner County with a new audience. Scott Bailey was quoted by saying they were playing a music format that was not normally heard on AM radio.

A few area broadcasters who liked the previous oldies format mocked Scott Bailey for the format change, but other broadcasters in the area praised Scott, Leslie, and Sandra Bailey for the change. Jack Williams, former owner of competitor WHIN, was very supportive of the format change; Williams is a family relative to Scott, Leslie, and Sandra Bailey.

In 2007, WMRO also aired a weekly program called "Music Business Radio", produced at the studios of WRLT in Nashville, that promotes local bands, artist and writers. Lightning 100's DJ Dan Buckley worked with Scott Bailey to air Music Business Radio on WMRO to a reach a larger audience.

On September 12, 2014, at 10 a.m., the station changed format from hot adult contemporary to mainstream adult contemporary, with no change in branding. The first song played on the new format was "I Love Rock 'n' Roll" by Joan Jett and The Blackhearts.

Before buying WMRO, Scott Bailey was an air personality known as "Scott the Rock" at Nashville's WVOL and 92Q WQQK, with a love for its urban contemporary format. He did "short stints" at WKDF, WMDB, and WFSK in Nashville; WQKR in Portland, Tennessee; and WLBQ in Morgantown, Kentucky. Scott Bailey began his radio career at WRVU at Vanderbilt University as a "Non Student" Volunteer in 1981, then went to WVCP at Volunteer State Community College taking radio courses from instructor Howard Esparvnik, at the same time working in the commercial radio business in the Nashville market. In January 2020, and after years of owning and operating WMRO, Scott Bailey retired from terrestrial radio after over 40 years.

On January 8, 2020, long-time Sunday afternoon DJ on WMRO, Wayne Akins, died after an extended illness. Wayne Akins had previously been a Sunday afternoon gospel music DJ at another area local AM station, but found his home at WMRO where he remained a very important asset to the station. Wayne Akins was from Westmoreland, Tennessee.

=== WMRO-AM's last days of operation and afterward ===
In the fall of 2018, the land and studio building on which WMRO's tower was located was sold by Classic Broadcasting. Classic Broadcasting could not pay the bank lein Citizens Bank of Lafayette, Tennessee had on the land and building only. Classic Broadcasting, under then President and General Manager, William E. "Bill" Bailey purchased the building, property and tower site on November 13, 1991, through an IRS auction. In 2018, the bank allowed Classic Broadcasting to sell the property and building only to pay off the lein. Classic Broadcasting (Scott, Leslie, and Sandra Bailey) sold the building and land to a private individual. During this time, Classic Broadcasting's consultant engineer, James A. (Jim) Turvaville filed and applied for WMRO to have special temporary authority to operate at 200 watts as a daytime–only station with a long wire antenna from Scott and Leslie Bailey's home. In a letter dated August 31, 2019, Scott Bailey returned WMRO's license to the FCC; the FCC cancelled the station's license on August 28, 2019. During the last two hours WMRO was on, Scott Bailey dropped the adult contemporary format, and went live playing classic rock and classic R&B of the 1970s and 1980s. The last song played on WMRO according to Scott Bailey was "Slow Ride" by Foghat. After the song ended, he shut the transmitter off.

Despite WMRO-AMs signal going silent for good, Scott and Leslie Bailey continued with Magic 1560’s online stream of a mix of adult contemporary and classic hits on a private streaming feed. On April 20th, 2020, the station’s music format (online stream) was changed to a mainstream rock-alternative rock format and it was rebranded as “Rock 1560, Gallatin’s Best Rock”. Touting itself as WMRO-AM, Rock 1560, the streaming only platform also added syndicated midday talk programming in 2023 as an affiliate of "The Alex Jones Show".
