= Mike Donegan =

Mike "The Duke" Donegan is an American radio broadcaster based in Nashville, Tennessee.

== Personal life ==
Donegan was born in Nashville, Tennessee, to Genovia and Beck Donegan. Donegan's parents owned a bakery in Green Hills. He is the brother of John Donegan, an engineer, photographer, and music executive. Donegan is the father of Barry Donegan, lead singer for the punk rock band Look What I Did, and a libertarian political activist.

Donegan attended Hillsboro High School in Nashville, Tennessee, graduated with a B.A. in social science from George Peabody College at Vanderbilt University, a Master of Professional Studies in Training and Development from the University of Memphis, (2016) and a J.D. from the Cecil C. Humphreys School of Law where he was a recipient of the Harold C. Streibich Intellectual Property Law Award.

== Career ==
The broadcast journalist and humorist most recently co-hosted a show on Sirius Satellite Radio and is the stadium announcer for the Tennessee Titans. For many years prior, Donegan was a mainstay on radio shows at Nashville stations WMAK, WKDF and WGFX, including "Big Dave and the Dook", "Ian Case and The Duke", "Carl P. Mayfield & The P. Team" and "The Wake-Up Zone". He was formerly the news director at WSM AM/WSM FM and a feature reporter for WSMV-TV.
