= WNFN =

Radio station in Franklin, Tennessee

- Franklin, Tennessee; United States
- Broadcast area: Nashville, Tennessee
- Frequency: 106.7 MHz
- Branding: Y'all 106.7

Programming
- Format: Classic country
- Affiliations: Westwood One

Ownership
- Owner: Midwest Communications; (Midwest Communications, Inc.)
- Sister stations: WCJK; WJXA

History
- First air date: September 22, 1995
- Former call signs: WNPL (1995–2004)
- Call sign meaning: "Nashville Fan" (former sports format)

Technical information
- Licensing authority: FCC
- Facility ID: 29862
- Class: C2
- ERP: 15,000 watts
- HAAT: 278 meters (912 ft)
- Transmitter coordinates: 36°15′50″N 86°47′38″W

Links
- Public license information: Public file; LMS
- Webcast: Listen Live
- Website: yall1067.com

WNFN (106.7 FM, "Y'all 106.7") is a classic country formatted radio station in the Nashville, Tennessee market. Its transmitter site is in Whites Creek, Tennessee and its studios are in Berry Hill, Tennessee.

Previously licensed to the affluent Nashville suburb of Belle Meade, but subsequently obtaining a permit for an increased signal, with a new license based the Nashville suburb of Millersville (just across the line from Davidson County), WNFN was formerly operated under the callsign of WNPL. The station's original construction permit listed Mt. Juliet, Tennessee as the city of license, but this was changed amid concerns of interference with radio communications at Nashville International Airport. The station's community of license has since moved to Franklin.

== History ==
=== Previous formats as WNPL ===
- 1998 to 1999: "106.7 The Planet" (Hot Adult Contemporary)
- 1999 to 2000: "Kiss 106.7" (Classic R&B)
- 2000 to 2002: "Rooster 106" (Active Rock) (briefly named "Beaver 106" upon launch)
- 2002 to 2004: "Blazin' 106-7" (Urban Contemporary)

=== As WNFN ===
- 2004 to 2009: "ESPN 106.7 The Fan" (Sports Talk) (briefly named "SportsRadio 106.7 The Fan" upon launch)
- 2009 to 2020: “i106.7” (Top 40/CHR)
- 2020 to 2023: "Hot 106.7" (Top 40/CHR)
- 2023 to Present: “Y’all 106.7” (Classic Country)

The former all-sports format was adopted on December 23, 2004, in part as a way of splitting the sports shows then broadcast on WWTN away from the political talk shows that it otherwise broadcasts on the premise that the overlap in listenership between the two formats is minimal, and the callsign change soon followed. The station had marketed itself as "Nashville's only all-sports FM" and "Nashville's Sports Leader", until the sports format was dropped on July 29, 2009.

The once-popular SportsNight afternoon drive-time talk show was briefly simulcast on both WWTN and WNPL/WNFN before being relegated to WNPL/WNFN alone in early 2005. Due in part to the lower power of WNFN and in part to the previous departure of popular host George Plaster to competitor WGFX, SportsNight (hosted by Blake Fulton, Joe Biddle and, for around two years, Pete Weber) fell into a precipitous ratings decline. Both it and the mid-day local talk show Sports Brunch (hosted by John Dwyer and Bryan Mullen) were discontinued in March 2006. SportsNight would eventually be replaced by The Sports Guys (which began in July 2006) featuring longtime Nashville sportscaster Bob Bell, former Middle Tennessee State University head football coach Boots Donnelly and Nashville newcomer Jonathan Shaffer. Donnelly left the show in February 2007, and was replaced by former Tennessee Titans President Jeff Diamond. Bell left in July 2007 and was replaced by Thom Abraham out of Cumulus sister station WUMP/Huntsville. The Abraham show was discontinued after February 6, 2009, leaving no local content, except for MTSU games and coaches' shows. Otherwise, the station broadcast almost exclusively programming from ESPN Radio and selected major sporting events. ESPN Radio was formerly featured on AM 560 WNSR (Nashville Sports Radio) in Nashville. According to a story in Billboard's Radio Monitor and other publications, Cumulus Media, WNFN's owner and ABC Radio, then ESPN's parent company, were both sued in Federal Court in Nashville over tortious interference with a contract (between ESPN and WNSR) due to the move of ESPN programming from WNSR to WNFN. According to the article, this was in violation of antitrust laws. Settlement was apparently made out of court after Cumulus and ABC tried unsuccessfully to move the suit to New York. After the sports format was dropped at WNFN, ESPN Radio was picked up by former rival WGFX.

In 2006, WNFN became the flagship station of the Middle Tennessee State University athletic department, and remained such until the sports format was dropped, at which time this function was reverted to the university's own station, WMOT.

=== Reformat to Top 40 ===
Former logo as "i-106" used from 2009 to 2016.

On July 29, 2009, WNFN went "under construction", airing construction sounds and saying that a new station in Nashville was being built and to check back at 1:06 pm. There were rumors the station would flip to a religious format as "Praise 106" and a man in a deep voice would occasionally quickly say "Praise 106", after a female announcer would say "A new station for Nashville is coming soon!" However no "Praise 106" ever launched, and this was only a stunt. On July 30, 2009, at 1:06 pm CST, the station launched a Top 40 (CHR) format as i106. "Boom Boom Pow" by The Black Eyed Peas was the first song. This was Cumulus's second Top 40 station launched during the same month, cloned after sister station WRWM in Indianapolis.

On September 16, 2011, WNFN and then sister station WRQQ (now WLVU) were placed into an independent trust (Volt Radio, LLC) while Cumulus sought a buyer. The move was forced by FCC ownership limits following Cumulus' acquisition of Citadel Broadcasting, which resulted locally in WKDF and WGFX joining the Cumulus cluster. The FCC, as of 2011, allowed a single company to own a maximum of five FM stations and two AM stations in any given market. To meet these guidelines in Nashville, Cumulus was forced to spin off two of its seven FM stations, and the company chose WRQQ and WNFN, traditionally its two lowest-performing stations.

On November 14, 2011, Cumulus announced it was removing WRQQ from the Volt Radio trust, replacing it with WQQK. WQQK was removed from the trust on April 30, 2013, leaving only WNFN to still be under a Trust Agreement to Volt Radio. However, on August 28, 2013, the ownership and control of WNFN once again changed, as Volt Radio transferred ownership and control of the station to Joule Broadcasting.

WNFN formerly broadcast in the HD format.

=== Sale to Midwest Communications ===
Former logo as i106.7 used from 2016 to 2020.

On February 9, 2016, Midwest Communications announced they would purchase WNFN from Joule Broadcasting for $3.75 million. Once the sale was finalized by the FCC on May 31, 2016, WNFN became the third radio station in the Nashville market to be owned by Midwest Communications. It also became a sister station to both WJXA (Mix 92.9) and WCJK (96.3 Jack FM). WNFN was to move its studios from Nashville's Music Row district to new studios located in south central Nashville near the Tennessee State Fairgrounds arena where WJXA and WCJK both have their studios.

On June 2, 2016, the station announced a new assistant programming director (Joe Breezy, who moved from WODS in Boston and would also do the afternoon shift on WNFN) as well as revealing a new on-air branding campaign. The station then identified itself as "i106-7" "Nashville's New Hit Music."

In February 2017, it was announced that then Program Director Barbara Bridges would become Operations Manager of i106-7, as Joe Breezy was elevated to Program Director. Midday host, and longtime market personality Butter was promoted to Assistant Program Director and music director.

=== Rebranding ===
On May 1, 2020, WNFN rebranded as “Hot 106-7”, which coincided with its signal upgrade to 15,000 watts, allowing the station to cover the Nashville metropolitan area. Effective December 28, 2020, WNFN was granted its license to move from Millersville to Franklin.

=== Change to Classic Country ===
On June 8, 2023, at 9 a.m., after playing "Adore You" by Harry Styles, the station began stunting with a loop of "Get Ready for This" by 2 Unlimited. One hour later, it switched to a '90s-focused classic country format, under the name "Y'all 106.7", launching with "Forever and Ever, Amen" by Randy Travis (notably, Travis was a special guest in the station's studio to help launch the format). The change results in the station now targeting market country leader WSM-FM, which ranked third with a 7.2 in the market's Nielsen Audio ratings for April 2023, behind only Midwest-owned WCJK and WJXA, and comes as the CHR format floundered in the ratings, with only a 1.6 in the April books, down from a 3.2 in January (notably, the only time in the entire run of the CHR format that it outright beat rival WRVW, albeit by only one-tenth of a ratings point, as WRVW had a 3.1). Then in the ratings book released in December 2023, the station jumped to a 4.0, placing it in range with it rival country stations.

== See also ==
- List of Nashville media
