= George Plaster =

American sports personality and administrator

George Plaster (born May 7, 1959) is an American former collegiate sports administrator and sports broadcasting personality. He previously served as associate athletic director at Belmont University. In May 2019 it was announced that Plaster would be leaving Belmont and returning to hosting a weekday sports talk program, to be entitled (as were several of his previous programs) SportsNight, beginning in July 2019 on WSM-AM. However, this program was discontinued on August 13, 2019, less than a month after its inception, with Plaster's final appearance having been on August 8. Plaster said he intended to return to sportscasting with a podcast to be announced, possibly around Labor Day. However, this plan was quickly supplanted by a new one when Plaster accepted an offer from WNSR to host a show weekdays 2-4 PM effective September 3, 2019. In the fall of 2021, this program was syndicated over several stations in the Middle Tennessee area, notably WKOM in Columbia, Tennessee, as the "Plaster Radio Network". In the summer of 2022, this program was moved to online streaming only under the auspices of Main Street Media.

Plaster previously worked for 102.5 FM "The Game" (WPRT-FM) in Nashville, and hosted an afternoon drive-time (3 to 6 PM Central Time show), SportsNight, with former Vanderbilt Commodores basketball and baseball player and former minor league baseball player Willy Daunic and also Nashville sports broadcasting personality Darren McFarland. He is also the former host of The Sports Zone, a daily afternoon sports talk radio program broadcasting on WGFX-FM (104.5 The Zone) in Nashville, Tennessee. Plaster had hosted the show since shortly after its 2003 inception until leaving WGFX in September 2011, and for ten years prior, hosted SportsNight, a similar program on WWTN-FM. Plaster also formerly hosted The State Auto SportsZone, a weekly television show that aired on Sunday nights from August to May on WZTV.

== Contract disputes ==
In the summer of 2003, Plaster was the central figure in a public contract dispute which led to, and later hampered, his move to WGFX. When Cumulus Media agreed to purchase WWTN from Gaylord Entertainment Company, Plaster invoked a contract loophole which voided his contract with WWTN. Earlier in the year, however, Plaster had begun negotiations with Citadel Broadcasting Company to move his show to then-classic rock station WGFX (Plaster was suspended from WWTN for nearly two weeks in February 2003 after Gaylord officials reportedly learned of his backroom dealings). Plaster left WWTN in July just as the sale to Cumulus was completed, having been employed by the station since the early 1990s. He announced through other media that his show would resume on WGFX in August.

However, on August 11, 2003, just hours before he was to debut on WGFX, Cumulus (with assistance from Gaylord) was granted an injunction in Davidson County Chancery Court, preventing Plaster from appearing on his new show. Cumulus had sought to quash Plaster's new contract, citing a non-compete clause in his original WWTN contract. Plaster was under the assumption the clause had been voided along with the contract, which had been signed by Gaylord Entertainment, not Cumulus. Cumulus then filed a breach of contract suit against Plaster, and he reacted with a counter suit alleging that Cumulus was illegally hampering his ability to make a living. Willy Daunic and Darren McFarland, who both also made the move to WGFX (though without legal consequence since neither was under contract to WWTN), took to the air in Plaster's place and continued that way for two full months. On October 11, the case was settled without trial, and Plaster received an undisclosed sum of money from Cumulus and Gaylord. He was also allowed to join his co-hosts on WGFX, where he continued to broadcast until September 16, 2011.

Public perception of the dispute favored Plaster, and most of his audience followed him to WGFX. Meanwhile, SportsNight continued at WWTN without Plaster, and was later moved to WNFN-FM, where it continued to compete with The Sports Zone until March 13, 2006. On that Wednesday, SportsNight was canceled and its hosts (including those who once worked with Plaster) were fired. SportsNight saw its ratings consistently and significantly drop in the three years following Plaster's departure. In July 2006, after three months of earning respectable ratings airing ESPN Radio programming against Plaster, WNFN launched The Sports Guys, a new afternoon show hosted by Nashville sportscaster Robert "Bob" Bell and former Middle Tennessee State head football coach Boots Donnelly, although Bell's declining health later caused him to leave the program. In July, 2009, WNFN changed formats as ratings never approached those of Plaster's show.

On September 16, 2011, another contract dispute occurred when Cumulus acquired Citadel (the sale had occurred earlier but closed at this time) and took over operation of WGFX and Plaster left the station, which has used the moniker "104.5 The Zone" since adopting the sports format. Plaster continued his work on TV, and returned to radio on July 23, 2012, as co-host of Baptist Sports Medicine SportsNight at the Game from 3:00 to 6:00 PM on 102.5 The Game (WPRT-FM) with Willy Daunic and Darren McFarland, where he remained until his departure on August 3, 2016.

== Voice therapy ==
In February 2006, Plaster began to experience difficulties with his voice, which soon became serious enough that he was forced to curtail his on-air activities. He began receiving voice therapy at the Vanderbilt University Voice Center. In April 2006, Plaster's participation in The Sports Zone was limited to online "cyberchat" on the station's website. On May 17, it was announced that Plaster would return to the airwaves on a limited, one-hour-per-day basis, effective with the May 19 show. He did so, conducting an interview with his good friend, former NBA and Vanderbilt center Will Perdue, who now serves as a color analyst for ESPN Radio and Westwood One. In early June, it was announced he would begin to appear on the show for two hours daily. He eventually returned to his standard schedule of three hours daily (3p–6p).

== Other work ==
Plaster served as the color analyst, opposite Bob Jamison, for the Nashville Sounds baseball club in the 1980s, occasionally filing in on play-by-play. He was also the play-by-play voice for Memphis State for one season and Vanderbilt athletics for three seasons as well as the Nashville Kats Arena Football League franchise. Additionally, he did play-by-play on local television broadcasts of Georgia Tech football and Western Kentucky basketball games. In the mid-1990s, Plaster served as co-host of a television show entitled Sports Talk on WNAB-TV.

Plaster was featured on Mark Wills's 2003 single "And the Crowd Goes Wild", from his album of the same name.

== Honors ==
In 2006, Plaster was named to the inaugural Talkers Magazine "Talkers 250" list, highlighting the 250 most influential talk radio hosts in America. He remained on the list in 2007 and 2008.

== Personal life ==
Plaster graduated from Battle Ground Academy in 1977. He was inducted into the Distinguished Alumnus Hall of Fame in June 2008. He also graduated from Vanderbilt University in 1981.

Plaster is a Nashville native. His late father was a close friend of the late former Nashville Vols, Vanderbilt, and Georgia Bulldogs announcer Larry Munson. He is proud of his Greek-American heritage and makes frequent reference to it, being for a long time one of three Greek-Americans prominent in Nashville broadcasting, the others being former WSMV news anchor Demetria Kaledemos and longtime (now retired) WTVF anchor Chris Clark.

== Bobblehead George ==
In June 2008, the Nashville Sounds baseball team gave away George Plaster bobblehead dolls as a game promotion. Nashvillian Jim Reams began posting photos on a website showing "Bobblehead George" dolls in diverse places around the world. After the website was listed ranked 74th the WordPress list of "top 100 fastest growing blogs", Reams decided to put the website to use as a fundraiser, and dedicated all revenues to an advocacy organization for hereditary angioedema patients.
