= WGFX =

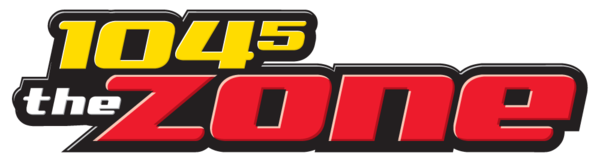
- Gallatin, Tennessee; United States
- Broadcast area: Nashville metropolitan area
- Frequency: 104.5 MHz (HD Radio)
- Branding: 104.5 The Zone

Programming
- Format: Sports
- Subchannels: HD2: Freeform "The Hill"; HD3: Country "Nashville Songwriter Radio"
- Affiliations: Fox Sports Radio; Tennessee Titans Radio Network; Tennessee Volunteers Vol Network; Westwood One Sports (one-minute hourly updates); Westwood One Sports (occasional broadcasts)

Ownership
- Owner: Cumulus Media; (Radio License Holding CBC, LLC)
- Sister stations: WKDF, WQQK, WSM-FM, WWTN

History
- First air date: December 1, 1960; 65 years ago (as WFMG)
- Former call signs: WFMG (1960–1971); WHIN-FM (1971–1978); WWKX (1978–1987)
- Call sign meaning: Gallatin’s FoX (from its former incarnation as Classic rock 104.5 The Fox)

Technical information
- Licensing authority: FCC
- Facility ID: 16893
- Class: C1
- ERP: 58,000 watts
- HAAT: 368 meters (1,207 ft)
- Transmitter coordinates: 36.268111°N 86.795833°W

Links
- Public license information: Public file; LMS
- Webcast: Listen live
- Website: 1045thezone.com

WGFX (104.5 FM) is a commercial radio station licensed to Gallatin, Tennessee, and serving the Nashville metropolitan area. It is branded as 104.5 The Zone, broadcasting a sports radio format. It is owned by Cumulus Media, with studios in Nashville's Music Row district. Most of its daytime schedule has local hosts, with programming from Fox Sports Radio heard nights and weekends.

WGFX has an effective radiated power of 58,000 watts. The transmitter is on Blevins Road off Interstate 24 in Whites Creek, Tennessee, amid the towers for other Nashville-area FM and TV stations.

== History ==
=== Early years ===
The station signed on as WFMG-FM on December 1, 1960, in Gallatin, Tennessee, about 30 miles (47 km) northeast of Nashville, with a big band format. The station was started by Ellis F. Jones Jr. The studio and transmitter location was located on North Water Street on Gallatin's Public Square. The transmitter power was 8.2 KW ERP according to FCC Records. In 1965, the station's studio and transmitter site was moved 5.1 miles north of the City of Gallatin to a location known as "Music Mountain". In 1971, Sumner Country Broadcasting Co., which owned WHIN in Gallatin, purchased WFMG and changed call letters to WHIN-FM. During the early years of WHIN-FM, the format was easy listening. In 1974, the station switched to an all oldies format. In July 1978, WHIN-FM flipped formats to contemporary hit radio (CHR). Just over one month later, the call letters were changed to WWKX using the moniker KX 104 FM.

In the late 1970s and early 1980s, the station was very popular and featured morning DJ Coyote McCloud. Its 100,000 watt signal broadcasting from "Music Mountain", one of the highest points on the northern Highland Rim north of Gallatin and the site of several broadcasting facilities, boomed far into the rural areas of northern Tennessee and southern Kentucky. By the mid-1980s, KX 104 was faced with competition from two new area CHRs, "96 Kiss" (WZKS, now WCJK) and "Y107" (WYHY, now WRVW). Additionally, McCloud defected to WYHY in 1985 to host its morning show. To try to differentiate itself, WWKX segued into a rock-leaning Top 40 format calling itself Rock Hits 104, Kicks FM. This move proved unfruitful, and the station returned to mainstream CHR a year later in 1986. Faced with the success of Y107, this would not last.

=== Classic Rock ===
In the summer of 1987, WWKX moved its tower from Music Mountain into Nashville and downgraded power, noticeably affecting signal strength in rural areas north of the city. The call letters changed to WGFX on August 13, 1987 and the moniker became 104.5 The Fox with a classic rock format.

In the late 1980s, Dick Broadcasting Company (DBC) took over operations of the station through a local marketing agreement (LMA), and paired it with its popular rock and roll station WKDF to form "Nashville's Rock Network". In the early 1990s, the station became known as "Arrow 104.5" (with Arrow originally standing for "All Rock n' Roll Oldies"). This format was somewhat successful and endured until the late 1990s.

The station was purchased outright by Dick Broadcasting Company following the Telecommunications Act of 1996, which, in part, loosened broadcast ownership rules. Shortly after the acquisition, Dick Broadcasting entered into an agreement with SFX Broadcasting, the then-owner of WLAC-FM, to trade the intellectual property of the stations. The trade, to have taken place February 2, 1998, would have moved WLAC-FM's adult contemporary format to 104.5 FM, and moved WGFX's classic rock format to 105.9 under SFX ownership. However, when the agreement fell apart, SFX converted WLAC-FM to a classic rock format of its own, changed the call letters to WNRQ, and began to compete directly with WGFX.

=== Rhythmic Oldies ===
Responding to the early ratings success of WNRQ, WGFX reformatted to rhythmic oldies as "Jammin' Oldies 104.5", on December 11, 1998, but quickly changed its name to "Groovin' Hits 104.5" after a brief trademark dispute.

In early 1999, WGFX was slated to convert to a country music outlet built around local air personality Carl P. Mayfield. Dick Broadcasting purchased advertising in other media promoting Mayfield's impending debut on 104.5 WGFX. However, the company ultimately succumbed to Mayfield's repeated demands that the format be installed on the stronger-signalled WKDF, leaving WGFX to continue broadcasting rhythmic oldies.

=== Classic Hits ===
In January 2000, the station reverted to a classic hits format, focusing mainly on 1970s music. First known as simply "The New 104 — That '70s Station", it became "The New 104 — The Core" a few months later, and was positioned as a lighter alternative to WNRQ.

Citadel Broadcasting purchased the station (along with all of DBC's assets outside the Greenville, South Carolina market) in September 2000. In the summer of 2002, the station broadened its playlist to include music from 1980s, and changed its name to "Rockin' Hits 104.5 WGFX", marking the only time the station has used those call letters in its branding.

=== Sports 104.5 The Zone ===
The All Sports format began on August 11, 2003, with the station renamed "104.5 The Zone." Management hired popular personalities George Plaster, Willy Daunic and Darren McFarland away from Cumulus Media station WWTN (99.7 FM). However, because of litigation surrounding a contract dispute, Plaster did not appear on the station until two months after its launch.

In the early days of the Zone, the station had a heavy focus on local news, and featured general-interest talk on weekdays from 6am-Noon, with sports in all other dayparts. For the first three weeks of the talk format, the station broadcast "The Rick and Bubba Show" (a holdover from the previous "Rockin' Hits" format). It then brought over Mayfield's "Carl P. & The P-Team" show from WKDF, where it had been replaced in morning drive. Following Mayfield's exit in December 2003, the station began broadcasting "The Wake-Up Zone" in early mornings, featuring Mayfield's supporting cast, but led by Nashville music industry executive Charlie Monk. Popular Knoxville morning talk personality Hallerin Hilton Hill also hosted a 2-hour version of his show for the Nashville market in the late morning slot.

Over the course of 18 months, the station migrated to 24/7 sports talk. Hill's show was canceled, and "The Wake-Up Zone" was converted to a sports-focused show, replacing Charlie Monk & Mike Donegan with Kevin Ingram and retired Titans tight end Frank Wycheck. They joined Mark Howard, who continued with the show from its previous iteration. The trio of Ingram, Howard and Wycheck continued on the show until 2017, when Wycheck left the show and was replaced with another former Titans star, Blaine Bishop.

=== Titans and Volunteers Football ===
WGFX was the flagship station for the Tennessee Oilers/Titans of the National Football League from 1997 until the completion of the 2001 season, when the rights were shifted to WGFX's sister station, WKDF. (WGFX returned as an "affiliate" station of the team's network for the 2004 season only). WGFX also aired the franchise's games in 1996, the final year the team was located in Houston, Texas. WGFX returned as the full-time flagship station of the Titans Radio Network in 2010.

WGFX is the major Nashville-area affiliate for the University of Tennessee Volunteers football and men's basketball, The Vols moved to WGFX on 2010 after many years on WLAC.

The station also broadcasts selected Belmont Bruins men's basketball games which do not conflict with the Vols.

In the past, WGFX has served as the flagship station for the Nashville Predators (NHL, 2005–2010), Vanderbilt Commodores (SEC, 2004–2009), and Nashville Sounds (PCL, 2010–2011).

WGFX has previously served as the Nashville affiliate for The Jim Rome Show, The Dan Patrick Show, Sporting News Radio and ESPN Radio, and is currently on its second stint as an affiliate of Fox Sports Radio. It was announced that in 2013 the station would once again drop its Fox affiliation to be an affiliate of the upstart CBS Sports Radio network, but never did actually did so. Shortly afterwards, the CBS Sports Radio affiliation went to a competitor, WNSR, as WGFX retained the Fox Sports Radio affiliation. However, WGFX also retains the hourly minute-long commentaries by CBSSR personalities such as Boomer Esiason and Doug Gottlieb.

=== Cumulus ownership ===
Following a bankruptcy, Citadel was acquired by Cumulus Media on September 16, 2011. Shortly after the merger, WGFX and WKDF moved their studios from Rutledge Hill to Cumulus' existing cluster at Music Row, where they broadcast alongside WWTN, WSM-FM, and WQQK. WRQQ and WNFN also briefly shared studio space with WGFX until they were each sold to separate buyers.

Plaster, Daunic and McFarland left WGFX immediately after Cumulus acquired the station in September 2011, and the trio was instrumental in launching its primary competitor, WPRT-FM.

In 2017, WGFX removed all network programming during its weekday prime dayparts, focusing entirely on locally-produced shows.

=== HD Radio subchannels ===
On February 27, 2024, Cumulus Media announced a partnership with radio technology companies Super Hi-Fi and Xperi to launch 2 new HD subchannels broadcasting from WGFX with the intent, in part, to showcase new innovative advances done by the two companies using their programming tools, most notably Super's "Program Director" radio operating system and Xperi's HD Radio and DTS AudioStage tools. WGFX-HD2 operates as "The Hill", which will be a free-form radio format focused on new and upcoming music across a variety of genres, being operated and programmed by the students of Green Hill High School in Mount Juliet, while WGFX-HD3 operates as "Nashville Songwriter Radio", a locally-focused format focused on Nashville songwriters and older artists that inspired them.

=== Nashville SC ===
In 2023, WGFX became the Nashville home to radio broadcasts of Major League Soccer matches involving the Nashville Soccer Club.

== Prior formats ==
- Rockin' Hits 104.5 WGFX – Classic Hits, 2002–2003
- The New 104 — The Core (briefly known as The New 104 — That '70s Station) – Classic rock, 2000–2002
- Groovin' Hits 104.5 (briefly known as Hot 104.5 and Jammin' Oldies 104.5) – R&B Oldies, 1998–2000
- Arrow 104.5 – Classic Hits, 1993–1998
- 104.5 The Fox – Classic Rock, 1988–1993 (call letters changed to WGFX, which stood for Gallatin's FoX)
- KX104 – Top 40, 1986–1987
- Rock Hits 104, Kicks FM – Rock/Top 40, 1985–1986
- Kix 104 – Top 40, 1978–1985 (as WHIN-FM and WWKX)
- WHIN-FM – Oldies, 1974–1978 / Easy Listening, 1971–1974
- WFMG-FM – Big Bands, 1960–1971.

== Notable personalities ==
- Fiona – 1999–2000
- Mike "The Duke" Donegan – 2003–2004
- Hallerin Hilton Hill – 2003–2005
- Carl P. Mayfield – 2003
- Coyote McCloud – 1980s
- Mark Howard – 1998–2020
- George Plaster – 2003–2011
- Rich "Brother" Robbin – 2002–2003
- Frank Wycheck – 2004–2016
- Kevin Ingram - 2004-2020
- Clay Travis – 2009–2014
- Blaine Bishop – 2010–present
- Dallas Reese – 1990–1992
- Lauren McCleash – 1989–1992
- Melissa Johnson Sweeton – 1989–1992/1999–2001

== See also ==
- List of Nashville media
