= Frank Wycheck =

American football player (1971–2023)

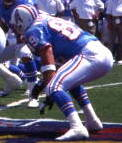
- Wycheck with the Houston Oilers in 1995

No. 36, 22, 89
- Position: Tight end

Personal information
- Born: October 14, 1971; Philadelphia, Pennsylvania, U.S.
- Died: December 9, 2023 (aged 52); Chattanooga, Tennessee, U.S.
- Listed height: 6 ft 3 in (1.91 m)
- Listed weight: 253 lb (115 kg)

Career information
- High school: Archbishop Ryan (Philadelphia, Pennsylvania)
- College: Maryland (1989–1992)
- NFL draft: 1993: 6th round, 160th overall pick

Career history
- Washington Redskins (1993–1994); Houston / Tennessee Oilers / Titans (1995–2003)

Awards and highlights
- Second-team All-Pro (2000); 3× Pro Bowl (1998–2000); Titans/Oilers Ring of Honor; Second-team All-ACC (1991)

Career NFL statistics
- Receptions: 505
- Receiving yards: 5,126
- Receiving touchdowns: 28
- Stats at Pro Football Reference

Frank John Wycheck (October 14, 1971 – December 9, 2023) was an American professional football player who was a tight end in the National Football League (NFL). He played college football for the Maryland Terrapins. As a professional, Wycheck played 11 seasons for the Washington Redskins and the Tennessee Titans, where he threw the lateral pass in the Music City Miracle. He had also spent time as a professional wrestler. Wycheck was the color commentator on the Tennessee Titans Radio Network from 2005 to 2016, and from 2004 to 2017, Wycheck co-hosted a morning sports radio show on Nashville radio station WGFX.

== Early life ==
Wycheck was born on October 14, 1971, in Philadelphia to Theodore (a Philadelphia police officer) and Marie Wycheck, Wycheck attended Archbishop Ryan High School in Northeast Philadelphia and the University of Maryland, College Park. At Archbishop Ryan, Wycheck was twice an All-Catholic running back and graduated as the school’s all-time leading rusher. He was also on the school's baseball and basketball teams.

== College football ==
As a freshman at Maryland, Wycheck led the Atlantic Coast Conference in receptions with 58 for 509 yards, including a school record 14 catches in a game against Virginia Tech. As a sophomore, Wycheck led the team with 45 receptions, made second-team All-ACC, and set the conference record for most receptions ever by a player in their first two seasons. In Wycheck's third season, Maryland hired coach Mark Duffner, who switched the team to a run and shoot offence, which tended to use four receivers and no tight end. As a result, Wycheck's playing time and receptions declined significantly.

Additionally, prior to the 1992 season, he contracted mononucleosis during spring practice and had a pulled groin that caused him to miss several preseason practice days. Starting out as a receiver, injuries to other Maryland running backs forced Duffner to play Wycheck at running back, where he started the final three games of the season, rushing for a total of 369 yards, including a 162-yard performance in Maryland's 53–23 win over the Clemson Tigers in the season finale.

"I feel like I really never got into the flow of the offense," Wycheck said after the season. "The last three games were great, but I'm a tight end type more than a running back." He decided to forgo his senior year and enter the 1993 NFL draft, finishing his three seasons at Maryland with 134 receptions for 1,183 yards, 80 carries for 391 yards, and eight touchdowns.

== Professional career ==
Pre-draft measurables
Height	Weight	Arm length	Hand span	40-yard dash	10-yard split	20-yard split	20-yard shuttle	Vertical jump	Broad jump	Bench press
6 ft 2 5/8 in (1.90 m)	232 lb (105 kg)	30 1/2 in (0.77 m)	10 1/8 in (0.26 m)	4.94 s	1.70 s	2.87 s	4.52 s	32.5 in (0.83 m)	9 ft 3 in (2.82 m)	18 reps

=== Washington Redskins ===
Wycheck was drafted in sixth round (160th overall) of the 1993 NFL draft by the Washington Redskins. With the arrival of new coach Norv Turner in 1994, the Redskins made a failed attempt to switch Wycheck to fullback. Later that same season, Wycheck was suspended for the final four games of the season by the league after testing positive for anabolic steroids. Wycheck was released by the Redskins in 1995.

=== Houston/Tennessee Oilers/Titans ===
In 1995, Wycheck was signed by the Houston Oilers. Following the 1996 season, the team relocated to Tennessee and became the Tennessee Oilers. They rebranded to the Tennessee Titans after the 1998 season.

Wycheck made the Pro Bowl in 1998, 1999, and 2000. Wycheck is perhaps most famous for his participation in the Music City Miracle, at the end of the 2000 Wild Card game against the Buffalo Bills. The Titans were down 16–15 with 16 seconds remaining. Wycheck took a hand-off from Lorenzo Neal and then threw the ball across the field to Kevin Dyson, who then turned the ball upfield 75 yards for the game-winning touchdown. The Titans would go on to make the Super Bowl that year, but would lose by a touchdown. Wycheck continued to play for the Titans before retiring after the 2003 season, having two concussions in a month that year.

In his 11-year career, Wycheck had 505 receptions for 5,126 yards and 28 touchdowns, and became one of six tight ends to surpass 500 receptions in NFL history. Wycheck led the Titans in receiving for three consecutive seasons (1999–2001). In the 1999 and 2002 postseasons, he had 14 receptions, twice tying the franchise record previously held jointly by Tim Wilson (1979) and Jackie Harris (also in the 1999 playoffs). Wycheck also went 5-for-6 passing the ball in his career (all on trick plays), resulting in 148 yards, two touchdowns, and a perfect 158.3 passer rating.

== NFL career statistics ==
=== Regular season ===
Year	Team	Games		Receiving					Rushing				
Year	Team	GP	GS	Rec	Yds	Avg	Lng	TD	Att	Yds	Avg	Lng	TD
1993	WAS	9	7	16	113	7.1	20	0	—	—	—	—	0
1994	WAS	9	1	7	55	7.9	20	1	—	—	—	—	0
1995	HOU	16	10	40	471	11.8	36	1	1	1	1.0	1	1
1996	HOU	16	16	53	511	9.6	29	6	2	3	1.5	3	0
1997	TEN	16	16	63	748	11.9	42	4	—	—	—	—	0
1998	TEN	16	16	70	768	11.0	38	2	—	—	—	—	0
1999	TEN	16	16	69	641	9.3	33	2	—	—	—	—	0
2000	TEN	16	16	70	636	9.1	37	4	—	—	—	—	0
2001	TEN	16	16	60	672	11.2	36	4	1	1	1.0	1	0
2002	TEN	15	15	40	346	8.7	22	2	—	—	—	—	0
2003	TEN	10	6	17	165	9.7	13	2	—	—	—	—	0
Career		155	135	505	5,126	10.2	42	28	4	5	1.3	3	1

=== Postseason ===
Year	Team	Games		Receiving				
Year	Team	GP	GS	Rec	Yds	Avg	Lng	TD
1999	TEN	4	4	14	92	6.6	14	0
2000	TEN	1	1	5	31	6.2	13	0
2002	TEN	2	2	14	164	11.7	39	1
2003	TEN	2	1	4	26	6.5	14	0
Career		9	8	37	313	8.5	39	1

== Professional wrestling appearances ==
In 2007, Total Nonstop Action Wrestling reported an altercation between Wycheck and James Storm. Wycheck, with the help of Jeff Jarrett, delivered a guitar shot to James Storm after the "Tennessee Cowboy" spat beer in the former Tennessee Titan's face. A match was then scheduled with Wycheck against James Storm at Slammiversary on June 17, 2007. At Slammiversary, he teamed with Jerry Lynn to defeat Storm and Ron Killings in a tag match. Wycheck won the match with a Cradle piledriver, Lynn's finishing move.

== Broadcasting career ==
In 2001, Wycheck "hosted" his own Titan player show with George Plaster and Willy Daunic on WGFX 104.5 FM until he retired from the game. Wycheck became a co-host of the morning drive time show The Wake Up Zone with Kevin Ingram and Mark Howard on the Nashville radio station WGFX "104.5 The Zone". Beginning with the 2005 season, Wycheck assumed color commentary duties on the Titans Radio Network.

Before the 2017 Titans preseason, it was announced that Wycheck would step down from being color commentator due to lingering head issues sustained during his football career. His absence was supposed to be temporary, but replacement Dave McGinnis returned for the 2018 season and subsequent seasons. In a corresponding move, Wycheck also left The Wake Up Zone morning show in 2017.

== Personal life and death ==
In 1995, Wycheck married Cherryn Krol. They had two children: Deanna (born 1991) and Madison (born 1997), before divorcing in 2009.

Wycheck was a supporter of the Tennessee Special Olympics, hosting the Wycheck Harley Ride charity event.

In a 2017 television interview on Fox-WZTV in Nashville, Wycheck stated that he was certain that he had CTE and that he feared the onset of 'scary' symptoms. Wycheck stated that he planned to donate his brain to the Concussion Legacy Foundation for study after he died. Wycheck estimated that he had as many as 25 concussions during his playing career.

On December 9, 2023, Wycheck died at age 52 after falling and hitting his head at his home in Chattanooga. A post-mortem study found that his brain suffered from chronic traumatic encephalopathy (CTE).
