= Blaine Bishop =

American football player (born 1970)

No. 23, 24
- Position: Safety

Personal information
- Born: July 24, 1970 (age 56); Indianapolis, Indiana, U.S.
- Listed height: 5 ft 9 in (1.75 m)
- Listed weight: 203 lb (92 kg)

Career information
- High school: Cathedral (Indianapolis)
- College: Ball State
- NFL draft: 1993: 8th round, 214th overall pick

Career history
- Houston / Tennessee Oilers / Titans (1993–2001); Philadelphia Eagles (2002)

Awards and highlights
- Second-team All-Pro (2000); 4× Pro Bowl (1995–1997, 2000)

Career NFL statistics
- Tackles: 738
- Sacks: 15.5
- Forced fumbles: 12
- Fumble recoveries: 11
- Interceptions: 5
- Defensive touchdowns: 1
- Stats at Pro Football Reference

Blaine Elwood Bishop III (born July 24, 1970) is an American former professional football player who was a safety in the National Football League (NFL), most notably for the Tennessee Titans. He was selected by the Houston Oilers in the 1993 NFL draft.

== Early life ==
Bishop attended and played at Cathedral High School in Indianapolis - class of 1988. He then attended St. Joseph's College and played football there before transferring to play college football at Ball State University in Muncie, Indiana. At Ball State University, Bishop earned All-Mid-American Conference Second-team choice in 1992 as a senior and 1990 as a sophomore. Named team captain his senior year. Bishop made 243 total tackles, 13 pass breakups, 15 tackles for loss, 12 sacks, one interception, and one blocked kick.

== Professional career ==
Pre-draft measurables
Height	Weight	Arm length	Hand span	40-yard dash	10-yard split	20-yard split	20-yard shuttle	Vertical jump	Broad jump	Bench press
5 ft 8 5/8 in (1.74 m)	194 lb (88 kg)	31 1/8 in (0.79 m)	8 1/8 in (0.21 m)	4.61 s	1.64 s	2.70 s	4.00 s	41.5 in (1.05 m)	10 ft 0 in (3.05 m)	20 reps
All values from NFL Combine

Bishop was drafted in the eighth round (214th overall) of the 1993 NFL draft by the Houston Oilers. Bishop went on to have a successful NFL career, earning Pro Bowl status four times in 1995, 1996, 1997, and 2000. He was also a three-time All-Pro selection, in 1995, 1996, and 2000. Bishop was widely recognized as one of the NFL's premier hitting safeties during his tenure with the Oilers/Tennessee Titans. In 1999, the Titans made it to Super Bowl XXXIV in which Bishop started, however they lost to the Kurt Warner-led St. Louis Rams. In 2002, he replaced Damon Moore as the starting strong-side safety with the Philadelphia Eagles, forming a tandem with free safety Brian Dawkins.

== Personal life ==
Shortly after retiring from his playing career, Bishop worked briefly at WTVF "NewsChannel 5" in Nashville, Tennessee providing sports commentary, usually as part of Titans post-game coverage. He currently co-hosts a radio show in Nashville called "Cover 2 with Blaine and Zach" with Zach Lyons on WGFX "104.5 the Zone" from 1 pm to 3 pm central each weekday. He also coaches the defense at Davidson Academy, a Nashville-area private high school. On Tennessee Titans game days, Bishop can be heard as part of the Titans Radio pre-game and post-game broadcast team on WGFX "104.5 the Zone", affiliates of the Titans Radio Network, and at www.titansradio.com. He is represented by KMG Sports Management. Bishop has also been an announcer for the Tennessee high school football state championship games along with former Titans teammate Kevin Dyson.
