= Ryman Hospitality Properties =

American hotel, resort, entertainment, and media company

Ryman Hospitality Properties, Inc.
- Formerly: Gaylord Broadcasting Company; Gaylord Entertainment Company
- Type: Public
- Traded as: NYSE: RHP; Russell 2000 component; S&P 600 component
- Industry: REIT; Entertainment
- Founded: 1925; 101 years ago
- Founder: Edward Gaylord
- Headquarters: Nashville, Tennessee, U.S.
- Key people: Colin Reed (Executive Chair); Mark Fioravanti (RHP CEO); Patrick Moore (Opry Entertainment CEO)
- Revenue: ▲US$747.7 million (2007)
- Operating income: ▼US$43.2 million (2007)
- Net income: ▲US$111.9 million (2007)
- Total assets: ▼US$2,336.9 million (2007)
- Total equity: ▲US$941.5 million (2007)
- Owner: The Vanguard Group (largest); BlackRock; GAMCO Investors (8.3%)
- Subsidiaries: Opry Entertainment Group

Ryman Hospitality Properties, Inc. is a hotel, resort, entertainment, and media company named for one of its assets: the Ryman Auditorium, a National Historic Landmark in Nashville, Tennessee. The company's legal lineage can be traced back to its time as a subsidiary of Edward Gaylord's Oklahoma Publishing Company; however, the backbone of the modern entity was formed with the company's acquisition of WSM, Inc. in 1983. This purchase resulted in the ownership of the Grand Ole Opry and associated businesses, including the company's flagship resort property, then known as Opryland Hotel. As such, Ryman Hospitality claims 1925 (the founding of WSM Radio and the Opry) as its founding date.

From its corporate spin-off from Oklahoma Publishing in 1991 until 2012, the organization was known as Gaylord Entertainment Company. Most of its media and entertainment ventures were closed or divested over time as the company was refocused into a hospitality-based business by the early-2000s, constructing and operating massive resort properties catering to the high-end corporate convention market. In 2012, Gaylord Entertainment sold the Gaylord Hotels brand, as well as operations of its existing resorts, to Marriott International and converted the company's corporate structure into a real estate investment trust, retaining ownership of the properties themselves, and taking the Ryman Hospitality name as a result of the transaction. The company continues to own and operate the Opry and its affiliated companies inside a majority-owned subsidiary called Opry Entertainment Group.

== History ==
=== Gaylord Broadcasting ===
The Oklahoma Publishing Company, owned by the Gaylord and Dickinson families, in 1928 purchased a commercial radio station, WKY, which started the company's involvement in broadcasting. Cofounder Edward K. Gaylord led the prospering publishing company into television broadcasting with the beginning of WKY-TV on June 6, 1949, which became the company's focus in the next two decades when it reached the then-legally-permitted maximum of seven stations with the 1962 acquisition of KTVT in Dallas-Fort Worth, Texas. Thus the company set up the Gaylord Broadcasting subsidiary for its broadcasting stations. In 1956, it merged with the Tampa Television Company, owners and licensee of CBS Tampa television station WTVT.

Cofounder Gaylord led the media mini-conglomerate through to a prosperous 1970s, during which he died in 1974 at age 101, leaving leadership of the companies to his son, Edward L. Gaylord. In 1974, the company purchased another television station, KSTW in Seattle. In 1977, it bought out New Orleans TV station and ABC affiliate WVUE from Columbia Pictures, which was about to exit the broadcasting industry at that time.

Gaylord Broadcasting formed Gaylord Productions in 1979 to enter TV and film production, opening an office in Century City, Los Angeles and hiring Elmo Williams as executive vice president. In 1981, Gaylord Productions purchased Yongestreet Productions, packager of the long-running television series Hee Haw, from its creators Peppiatt and Aylesworth. With the purchase of Yongestreet, Williams became president of Gaylord Productions' movie division while Alan Courtney assumed the presidency of its TV division. Gaylord continued to produce and distribute Hee Haw until it ended its run in 1997.

The company was aware of the Grand Ole Opry's business expansion in the 1970s and early 1980s, with Edward considering that company as a fit for Gaylord Broadcasting. The Opry and its associated businesses (including Opryland USA, Opryland Hotel, The Nashville Network, Ryman Auditorium, WSM & WSM-FM) were caught in the middle of the hostile takeover of their owner, NLT Corporation, by American General Insurance, and were put up for sale by the new parent shortly after the takeover was complete. Gaylord Broadcasting agreed to buy the Opry properties in September 1983. The holding company for the acquisitions was renamed from WSM, Inc. to Opryland USA, Inc. and continued under existing management. These acquisitions form the base of the company that exists today.

Gaylord followed up the Opry acquisition with an attempt to purchase the Texas Rangers, to no avail.

Opryland USA started the Gaylord Syndicom division on July 15, 1984, to develop syndicated TV programs. While in 1985, Acuff-Rose Music, an established country music publisher, was acquired by its Opryland Music Group Gaylord opened in 1985 the General Jackson river and paddle-wheel showboat, as an attraction at the Opryland theme park. In 1987, Gaylord Production Company had reached a co-development and co-production deal with Four Point Entertainment, to generate products for first-run syndication, home video and network.

With Opryland efforts producing success, Gaylord had his organization focus on Opryland in the late 1980s, while TV operation increased profits during that time. Gaylord Broadcasting was able to sell television stations WTVT in Tampa and WVUE in New Orleans for $365 million in 1987 while getting a $100 million tax credit for selling to a minority-owned company with the condition that the proceeds would be rolled into a media-released purchase within two years. However, to meet the deadline, Gaylord overpaid for a California cable television company and, in doing so, incurred a heavy debt load.

=== Gaylord Entertainment ===
Corporate logo as Gaylord Entertainment Company, 2001–2012

Gaylord Entertainment Company was formed on October 24, 1991, as the company went public. The new company consisted of Oklahoma Publishing Company's broadcasting and entertainment holdings. Twenty-two percent of the stock was sold to the public, while Gaylord retained 66% and voting control. Also during the public offering period, the company laid out expansion plans for the Opryland hotel and theme park plus a Ryman Auditorium renovation. A new corporate headquarters was constructed on the Opryland property in Nashville.

A controlling stake in Country Music Television was purchased in January 1991 with Group W Satellite Communications buying the remaining stock. CMT moved its headquarters to Opryland Drive, Nashville. The cable channel was expanded into Europe in 1992. CMT Euro was launched in October 1992. In July 1993, Gaylord reorganized, placing all its cable channels, CMT, CMT Europe, and TNN, in a division under a senior vice president, David Hall.

Gaylord purchased a 30% stake in the Bass Pro Shops retail chain in 1993 from Bass Pro Group. In April 1994, Gaylord Entertainment and the city of Nashville made an unsuccessful bid for the Minnesota Timberwolves professional basketball team to move to Nashville.

Gaylord Broadcasting in 1994 sued The WB network to get some of its stations out their affiliation with the network, in order to change their affiliations to CBS. The WB countersued for breach of contract and acting in bad faith. As a part of the settlement, Gaylord Broadcasting sold Houston's KHTV to WB partner Tribune Broadcasting.

In 1995, Gaylord Entertainment purchased Nashville radio station WWTN (99.7) out of bankruptcy, and made several capital improvements to the station. The company kept WWTN's existing news/talk/sports format, but integrated its operations with its two existing radio stations (WSM and WSM-FM) and moved its studios to the Opryland complex.

Gaylord Entertainment began moving into the niche of Christian-oriented businesses with the May 1996 assumption of management of Z Music Television, along with an option to buy 95% of the cable channel. Gaylord extended its portfolio of Christian-related businesses. Word Entertainment, a Christian music company, was purchased in January 1997 from Thomas Nelson Publishers. Word and artist/producer Steve Taylor launched in September 1997 Squint Entertainment joint venture label. In 1999, 51% of the Christian music website musicforce.com was acquired, while musicforce.com in turn purchased all of Lightsource.com, a provider to broadcast.com of Christian content. A new online division, GETdigitalmedia, soon followed.

Gaylord Entertainment sold for stock its two cable channels, except for CMT International and Z-Music management rights and stock options, to CBS-Westinghouse in February 1997. CMT International ceased the CMT Europe channel due to high losses from distribution and satellite costs on March 31, 1998. In Europe, it shifted to providing CMT as block programming to other channels. In 1997, Gaylord sold off KSTW to Cox Enterprises, which was traded to Viacom's Paramount Stations Group for KIRO-TV, and in turn Belo Corporation had bought out St. Louis' CBS television station KMOV.

Also, on December 31, 1997, the Opryland USA theme park was closed for redevelopment into a shopping and entertainment district called Opry Mills. With its The Mills Corp. partner, building began in October 1998 on the complex, which opened in May 2000. Gaylord would own a third of the district, while The Mills would hold a majority 2/3 share. Terry E. London was appointed in 1997 as CEO.

Gaylord Cable Networks purchased a 15% stake in the TV Argentina and Solo Tango pay TV channels in the Fall of 1999 when it added a programming block to TV Argentina, a music and lifestyle channel. In May 2000, Gaylord increased its stakes in the two channels to 50%. The company expanded to convert TV Argentina to "MusicCountry" and expand Solo Tango, a dance-focused channel, reaching beyond Argentina and its limited South American distribution. Gaylord Cable Networks launched the MusicCountry cable channel in Mexico and Argentina on July 1, 2000, and closed Z Music on June 30, 2000. In Mexico, MusicCountry was a two-hour programming block on the Video Rola music channel. The block on TV Argentina started with nine hours per day, three of which aired in prime time, with expectations to expand to 24 hours. MusicCountry would take a broader view of country, localizing it to include Americana, folk, rock, and roots music programming. On September 1, 2000, the MusicCountry brand became available in Europe. In the Australia, Brazil, Indonesia, the Philippines, and Asia-Pacific region areas, CMT channels would rebrand to MusicCountry by year's end. A 24-hour schedule was slated for the Australia and Pacific Rim channels. The MusicCountry Latin America channel in Argentina launched with its Latin America partner, Ashmore, as a 24-hour channel in late November 2000, a rebranding of TV Argentina.

In 1997, in partnership with the newly formed Nashville Predators (NHL) hockey team (which would begin play in 1998, and of which Gaylord Entertainment owned a 20% share), the company purchased the naming rights to Nashville's new downtown arena, which became known as the Gaylord Entertainment Center. The agreement − originally signed for 20 years at a cost of $2 million per year − was canceled in 2005, but the name remained on the arena until 2007. Gaylord also divested its ownership share of the franchise.

Gaylord started its Family Value Entertainment division with the April 1997 purchase of the Blanton Harrell Entertainment management firm. Z Music and Word Entertainment were transferred into the division. Division co-presidents appointed were Michael Blanton and Dan Harrell.

In July 1998, Gaylord Entertainment purchased Pandora Investment, a Luxembourg-based film acquisition and distribution company, and placed it in its Idea Entertainment division. Gaylord funded in March 1999 Indigo Productions.

Wildhorse Saloon, a country music dance club and restaurant, was opened in 1994 in downtown Nashville. A second location was opened at Downtown Disney at Walt Disney World in 1998 as a part of a plan to expand the Nashville club into a nationwide chain. However, the Disney location was closed in November 1999, having incurred a loss of $16 million. Gaylord's Dallas-Fort Worth TV station, KTVT, was sold to CBS in October 1999 for $485 million.

Gaylord Films was started with the hiring of producer Hunt Lowry as president in May 2000 as he ended his first look deal at Walt Disney Studios. Gaylord Films would focus on mainstream films while mid-budget and specialty films would be Pandora's area. The film unit signed in September 2000 a co-financing, distribution and production deal with Warner Bros. for four years and up to ten films. In October 2000, Pandora Pictures was slated to move to Los Angeles with Lowry taking over as the company president, with a mostly new executive team.

2000 also saw Gaylord invest in several websites, such as the Edgate.com Inc. kid portal, the CountryCool.com country music site and the RockCity.com short film site. London left as CEO, along with internet division head Brian Payne and creative content group president Tim DuBois. New management in the early 2000s believed that Gaylord Entertainment's future lied solely in the management of the hospitality arm of the company. With the exception of the Grand Ole Opry, Ryman Auditorium, General Jackson Showboat, Wildhorse Saloon, and WSM radio in Nashville, all the non-hotel businesses were abandoned or sold. By 2001, the company closed or sold its stakes in the above websites plus Lightsource.com and Musicforce.com and took a $59 million charge. Golf event entities were sold to Oklahoma Publishing Co. Word Entertainment's UK operations were sold in Spring 2001 to STL, Ltd. Squint was reduced to a label when its staff was let go in August 2001, with only Taylor remaining as president to handle artists and repertoire. In December 2001, Gaylord agreed to sell Word Entertainment to Warner Music Group with the sale closing in December 2002.

Gaylord Entertainment announced construction on two Opryland Hotels in late 1998 in Osceola County, Florida (near Orlando) and in Grapevine, Texas, slated to open in 2002 and 2003, respectively. Their hotel development plans were expanded by 2001 to a total of five to seven hotels, beginning with the Opryland Hotel Potomac, a 2,000-room hotel and convention center at National Harbor, Maryland with a construction start in 2002 in order to open in 2004. Other locations announced later were San Antonio, Texas, San Diego, Mesa, Arizona, and Denver, Colorado. The Gaylord Hotels division opened Gaylord Palms Hotel & Convention Center in Kissimmee, Florida in 2002. The Gaylord Opryland Texas Resort & Convention Center opened in April 2004. Opryland Hotel Potomac opened on April 1, 2008, as the Gaylord National Resort & Convention Center.

Acuff-Rose Music was sold in August 2002 to Sony/ATV Music Publishing for over ten times over the original purchase price. In March 2003, Gaylord sold its two Nashville FM radio stations (WSM-FM 95.5 and WWTN 99.7) to Cumulus Media. Gaylord retained ownership of WSM (AM), but the station's sales department was managed by Cumulus as part of a joint sales agreement. That contract expired in 2008, returning WSM (AM) to Gaylord's full control. Gaylord Entertainment sold the Gaylord Films and Pandora Films libraries and in-development projects to Qualia Capital in March 2006, who also had the Rysher Entertainment library.

Gaylord Entertainment acquired ResortsQuest International in November 2003 via a stock swap. Gaylord named their senior vice president of marketing, Mark Fioravanti, to be the ResortQuest CEO. In December 2004, ResortQuest sold its software arm's name, First Resort Software, and its property management software to Instant Software. Gaylord purchased the Aston Waikiki Hotel on June 2, 2005 from Leucadia National while selling 80.1% to a private real estate fund managed by DB Real Estate Opportunities Group. In April 2007, Gaylord had its subsidiary sell its Hawaiian holdings, while retaining shares in two hotels, to Interval Acquisition Corp., a unit of IAC/InterActiveCorp. This was followed by a June 2007 agreement to sell the rest of ResortQuest to a subsidiary of Leucadia National Corp. One of the two Hawaiian hotels with an 18.1% share retained, ResortQuest Kauai Beach at Makaiwa, continued to be managed by the renamed ResortQuest Hawaii, Aston Hotels & Resorts, until the hotel was placed in receivership and sold in August 2010 to a major Southern California real estate firm. The Aston Waikiki Beach Hotel (19.9 percent ownership stake) was sold in 2014 to Inland American Lodging Group.

TRT Holdings, owned by the Texas billionaire Robert Rowling, bought 14 percent of Gaylord stock in early 2008. Later that year, Gaylord rejected Rowling's bid to increase TRT's stake to 30 percent and getting three board director positions, saying there would be no benefit to the company and also noting TRT's potential conflict of interest, since TRT owned the Omni Hotel chain, which competed against Gaylord for conference and convention business. The company adopted a shareholder rights plan as a "poison pill" in 2008. TRT got two seats on the Gaylord board of directors by August 2011, when TRT purchased additional shares of Gaylord bring its ownership share to 21%. In management's effort to see the Marriott plan succeed, the company paid $185 million on August 7, 2012, for almost half of the shares owned by Rowling and launched an offering to help him dispose of his remaining 5.6 million shares. Rowling had previously opposed the Marriott purchase saying, "The company can go on a diet without having surgery. We would rather see Gaylord maintain the status quo and implement the savings without permanently impairing the value of the Gaylord Properties by encumbering them with the onerous, long term Marriott Agreement." Omni was revealed as the developer of the Fifth Avenue convention center hotel adjacent to the downtown Nashville Music City Center in August 2010, with a scheduled opening date of 2013.

=== Ryman Hospitality Properties ===
The company agreed to sell the Gaylord Hotels division, including the brand with a 35-year management contract, to Marriott International in May 2012, while retaining ownership of the hotels. The company also announced that they would not continue developing the Aurora, Colorado hotel-convention center. The company's second-largest shareholder, Mario Gabelli's GAMCO Investors, called for the company to spin off its Opry and Attractions division. In September 2012, Gaylord also agreed that Marriott's Gaylord Hotels would also manage on the company's behalf Radisson Hotel Opryland, Gaylord Springs Golf Links, the General Jackson Showboat and the Wildhorse Saloon. As a result of the sale, the company lost the rights to use the Gaylord name, resulting in the change to Ryman Hospitality Properties, Inc., after it initially chose the name Granite Hotel Properties. According to chairman and CEO Colin Reed, Ryman would continue to operate and manage the Grand Ole Opry, Ryman Auditorium, and WSM radio for the time being, stating that they were "iconic" assets. On September 25, 2012, shareholders voted for the reorganization as a REIT and sale of Gaylord Hotels to Marriott. Ryman Hospitality Properties began operations on October 1, at which time management of the venues by Marriott began. The Radisson Opryland on December 1 would convert to Marriott management under the new name of the Inn at Opryland.

Marriott opened in April 2015 the AC Hotel Washington, D.C., with ownership by Ryman Properties in National Harbor, Maryland. In March 2016, Ryman revived its Gaylord Rockies Resort and Convention Center project in a joint venture with RIDA Development and Ares Management, with a 35% stake in the complex to be managed via Marriott.

Opry Entertainment opened on December 1, 2017, the Opry City Stage as a joint venture in New York City. The venue was planned to be turned into a chain. It closed within ten months of opening, and the company abandoned the concept. Instead, Ryman focused on expanding its other bar/restaurant concept which premiered in 2017 named Ole Red, which is operated in partnership with country music artist Blake Shelton and is inspired by his hit song Ol' Red. As of 2024, the chain has six locations: two in Nashville, and one each in Tishomingo, Oklahoma, Gatlinburg, Tennessee, Orlando, Florida, and Paradise, Nevada (on the Las Vegas Strip).

Ryman agreed to December 2019 to purchase the Block 21 entertainment complex, which includes the Austin City Limits venues, from Stratus Properties for $275 million, including assumption of about a $141 million mortgage. An offering of at least 3 million shares of Ryman would be made to fund the purchase in the first quarter of 2020.

In 2021, Ryman Hospitality purchased controlling interest in the Gaylord Rockies Resort & Convention Center.

On April 4, 2022, it was announced that investment company Atairos and media conglomerate NBCUniversal will jointly buy the 30% minority stake in Opry Entertainment from Ryman, which will retained the 70% ownership in the company, but organize it into a new holding company separate from the REIT called Ryman Hospitality Holdings.

In 2023, Ryman Hospitality reclaimed management of Wildhorse Saloon from Marriott, and began redeveloping the property into a new concept called Category 10, inspired by the life and music of country music artist Luke Combs. It is slated to open in phases, beginning in the Summer of 2024.

Also in 2023, Ryman Hospitality purchased the JW Marriott San Antonio Hill Country Resort & Spa from Blackstone Real Estate Income Trust. Marriott International will continue to operate the property under the JW Marriott flag.

== Properties ==
Facilities owned by Ryman Hospitality Properties and operated by Opry Entertainment include:

- Grand Ole Opry
- Ryman Auditorium
- WSM, Nashville radio station
- Opry Entertainment 70% stake inside Ryman Hospitality Holdings)
- Block 21 in Austin, Texas
- Ole Red, live music venue and restaurant/bar chain.
- Category 10

Facilities owned by Ryman Hospitality Properties, but managed by Marriott International, include:

- Gaylord Hotels
  - Gaylord Opryland Resort & Convention Center in Nashville, Tennessee
  - Gaylord Palms Resort & Convention Center near Orlando, Florida
  - Gaylord Texan Resort & Convention Center in Grapevine, Texas, located in the Dallas/Fort Worth area.
  - Gaylord National Resort & Convention Center in National Harbor, Maryland
  - Gaylord Rockies Resort & Convention Center in Aurora, Colorado
  - The Inn at Opryland, A Gaylord Hotel
- AC Hotel Washington, D.C., in National Harbor, Maryland
- JW Marriott San Antonio Hill Country Resort & Spa in San Antonio, Texas
- Gaylord Springs Golf Links
- General Jackson Showboat

Previously owned properties and ventures include:

- Opryland USA (1972–1997) theme park
- Fiesta Texas Theme Park (minority interest)
- WKY Radio, Oklahoma City
- ResortQuest International, Inc. (November 2003— 2007)
- Aston Waikiki Beach Hotel
- ResortQuest Kauai Beach
- Bass Pro Shops' Outdoor World (minority interest)
- Opryland Music Group
  - Acuff-Rose Music
- Grand Ole Opry Tours
- Opryland River Taxis
- Opryland Productions
- Opryland Theatricals
- Corporate Magic
- Gaylord Cable Networks
  - The Nashville Network
  - CMT
  - CMT International
    - CMT Europe
  - MusicCountry cable channel
    - MusicCountry Latin America (50%) formerly TV Argentina
  - Solo Tango dance cable channel (50%)
- Nashville Predators (minority interest)
- Opry Mills (minority interest)
- Family Value Entertainment division (April 1997—)
  - Blanton Harrell Entertainment talent management firm
  - Z Music Television (Christian music video channel) management with options to purchases
  - Word Entertainment (1997—January 2002) Christian music company distributed by Epic at the time of sale to Warner Music Group
    - Word Record, Christian record label
    - Word Publishing
    - Word Distribution, Christian market distribution
    - Quint Entertainment, joint venture label
- Idea Entertainment division
  - Pandora Investments
  - Indigo Productions (March 1999—) minor stake; a new venture by British film and TV producers Nigel Stafford-Clark and Scott Meek started in 1998 after they departed Zenith Production.
  - Gaylord Films
- Gaylord Production Company
- musicforce.com
- lightsource.com
- Gaylord Digital
- Opry City Stage, a 28,000 square-foot four-floor music venue and bar/restaurant in Times Square, New York City. The venue operated from December 1, 2017, to September 27, 2018.
- Circle, a digital multichannel television network (50% joint venture with Gray Television, ended in 2023)

== Broadcast properties ==
Ryman Hospitality's only present broadcast property, as noted above, is WSM (650 AM) in Nashville, a heritage country music station with a 50,000-watt clear-channel signal. Oklahoma Publishing acquired WSM as part of its purchase of the Grand Ole Opry and associated businesses in 1983.

Ryman, while it was a subsidiary of Oklahoma Publishing, owned several television and radio stations. The broadcasting subsidiary originated as the WKY Radiophone Company, named after its Oklahoma City flagship stations. In 1956 it became the WKY Television System, holding onto that moniker until 1975 when it took on the Gaylord Broadcasting Company name. Below are charts of stations formerly owned by Ryman's predecessor companies.

Stations are arranged in alphabetical order by state and city of license.

Note: ** indicates a station built and/or signed-on by Oklahoma Publishing/Gaylord Broadcasting.

=== Radio ===
AM Station	FM Station

City of license / Market	Station	Years owned	Current status
Albuquerque, NM	KRKE 610	1974–1980	KNML, owned by Cumulus Media
Albuquerque, NM	KRKE-FM 94.1	1976–1980	KZRR, owned by iHeartMedia
Oklahoma City, OK	WKY 930	1928–2002	Owned by Cumulus Media
Oklahoma City, OK	WKY-FM 98.9	1947–1952	defunct, went silent in 1952 (frequency now used by KYIS)
Portland, OR	KYTE 970	1977–1983	KUFO, owned by Alpha Media
Portland, OR	KYTE-FM/KLLB 101.1	1977–1983	KXL-FM, owned by Alpha Media
Nashville, TN	WSM 650	1983–present	
Nashville, TN	WSM-FM 95.5	1983–2003	Owned by Cumulus Media
Nashville, TN	WWTN 99.7	1995–2003	Owned by Cumulus Media

=== Television ===
City of license / Market	Station	Channel	Years owned	Current status
Montgomery–Selma, AL	WSFA	12	1955–1959	NBC affiliate owned by Gray Media
Denver, CO	KLZ-TV**	7	1953–1954	ABC affiliate KMGH-TV, owned by the E. W. Scripps Company
Tampa–St. Petersburg, FL	WTVT	13	1956–1987	Fox owned-and-operated (O&O)
Wichita–Hutchinson, KS	KTVH	12	1968	CBS affiliate KWCH-DT, owned by Gray Media
New Orleans, LA	WVUE	8	1977–1987	Fox affiliate owned by Gray Media
Lorain–Cleveland, OH	WUAB	43	1977–1989	Independent/MyNetworkTV station owned by Gray Media
Oklahoma City, OK	WKY-TV**	4	1949–1976	NBC affiliate KFOR-TV, owned by Nexstar Media Group
Fort Worth–Dallas, TX	KTVT	11	1962–1999	CBS owned-and-operated (O&O)
Houston, TX	KHTV**	39	1967–1995	The CW outlet KIAH, owned-and-operated (O&O) by Nexstar Media Group
Tacoma–Seattle, WA	KSTW	11	1974–1997	Independent station owned by CBS News and Stations (Paramount Skydance)
Milwaukee, WI	WVTV	18	1966–1996	The CW affiliate owned by Rincon Broadcasting Group
