= WWTN =

Talk radio station in Hendersonville–Nashville, Tennessee

Coordinates: 35.817556°N 86.523333°W

- Hendersonville, Tennessee; United States
- Broadcast area: Nashville metropolitan area
- Frequency: 99.7 MHz
- Branding: SuperTalk 99.7 WTN

Programming
- Format: News/Talk
- Network: ABC News Radio
- Affiliations: Westwood One

Ownership
- Owner: Cumulus Media; (Cumulus Licensing LLC)
- Sister stations: WKDF, WGFX, WSM-FM, WQQK

History
- First air date: June 20, 1962; 63 years ago
- Former call signs: WMSR-FM (1962–1990); WQLZ (1990–1991)
- Call sign meaning: We're Talking Nashville

Technical information
- Facility ID: 31476
- Class: C0
- ERP: 100,000 watts
- HAAT: 395 meters (1,296 ft)

Links
- Webcast: Listen live
- Website: 997wtn.com

WWTN (99.7 FM) is a commercial radio station serving the Nashville media market. The station is owned by Cumulus Media and is marketed as "SuperTalk 99.7 WTN" (the first W of its call sign is eliminated for simplicity). WWTN is licensed to the city of Hendersonville, Tennessee, which is approximately 15 miles (24 km) northeast of Nashville. The station's studios are in the Music Row district of Nashville.

WWTN transmits with an effective radiated power of 100,000 watts, the maximum for most FM stations, and is a Class C0 station. Its signal covers most of Middle Tennessee, even venturing into parts of Northern Alabama and Southern Kentucky. Its antenna (395 meters/1296 feet in height above average terrain) is located approximately 25 miles (40 km) SSE of Nashville in Rutherford County, Tennessee, between the cities of Murfreesboro and Franklin.

== Programming ==
WWTN's primary competition is WLAC 1510 AM, a talk radio station owned by iHeartMedia, Inc. Talk and information programs are also heard on non-commercial NPR member station 90.3 WPLN-FM owned by Nashville Public Radio.

=== Schedule ===
Weekdays on WWTN features local and nationally syndicated conservative talk shows. Local hosts are heard all morning and in afternoon drive time. In middays, Texas-based Chad Benson deals with national and Tennessee issues. The weekday evening schedule from the co-owned Westwood One network includes The Mark Levin Show and Red Eye Radio.

Weekends features programs on special interests, including syndicated programs The Kim Komando Show and Sunday Night with Bill Cunningham. Some weekend hours are paid brokered programming. Most hours begin with an update from ABC News Radio.

== History ==
The station first signed on the air on June 20, 1962. The original call sign was WMSR-FM, licensed to the Manchester Broadcasting Company in the city of Manchester, Tennessee. In the mid-1960s, the licensee was changed to Joseph M. Carter, Trustee in bankruptcy.

In the early 1990s, the station began focusing on the Nashville market. Manchester is nearly halfway between Nashville and Chattanooga, although the Cumberland Plateau prevents Manchester FM signals from serving Chattanooga.

The station faced major financial difficulties in the early 1990s, until being purchased by Gaylord Entertainment Company in 1995. Gaylord also owned 650 WSM (AM) and 95.5 WSM-FM, as well as the Grand Ole Opry concert hall and Opryland USA amusement park. During this period, WWTN broadcast a mixture of locally originated general interest talk programming, sports talk, and the Business Talk Radio Network. Within three years after the Gaylord purchase, WWTN was Nashville's highest-billing radio station.

=== Ramsey and Valentine ===
In 1992, WWTN began airing The Money Game, a local financial advice show with Dave Ramsey, Hal Wilson, and Roy Matlock. Wilson and Matlock left the show at different points in its early history. With Ramsey hosting alone, his company assumed ownership of the program, which was renamed The Dave Ramsey Show in 1996. It was eventually independently syndicated to over 500 stations nationwide. WWTN served as the flagship station until 2012, when Ramsey moved the show to 102.5 WPRT-FM in 2013, and then to WLAC 1510 AM in 2014.

In 2003, WWTN and WSM-FM were sold to Cumulus Media for $65 million. The city of license changed to Hendersonville in 2008, as part of a larger project that saw four of Cumulus' five Nashville stations change cities of license in the process of allowing sister station WNFN to move its transmitter and increase power.

WWTN served as the flagship station for a nationally syndicated weekday afternoon talk show hosted by Phil Valentine until July 2021, when his health deteriorated from COVID-19 and its after-effects. Valentine died on August 21, 2021.

== See also ==
- List of Nashville media
