= WJXA =

Adult contemporary radio station in Nashville

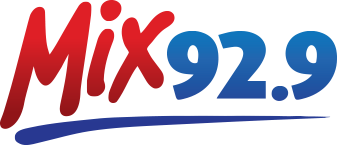

Nashville, Tennessee; United States
- Broadcast area: Nashville; Bowling Green; Clarksville-Hopkinsville
- Frequency: 92.9 MHz
- RDS: 1.WJXA; 2.Mix92.9
- Branding: Mix 92.9

Programming
- Format: Adult contemporary

Ownership
- Owner: Midwest Communications; (Midwest Communications, Inc.)
- Sister stations: WCJK; WNFN

History
- First air date: 1976 (as WZEZ)
- Former call signs: WZEZ (1976–1994)
- Call sign meaning: For former "J-92.9" branding

Technical information
- Licensing authority: FCC
- Facility ID: 61035
- Class: C
- ERP: 100,000 watts
- HAAT: 321 meters (1,053 ft)
- Transmitter coordinates: 36°7′14.2″N 86°58′7″W

Links
- Public license information: Public file; LMS
- Webcast: Listen live
- Website: www.mix929.com

WJXA (92.9 FM) is an adult contemporary radio station. Licensed to Nashville, Tennessee, United States, the station serves the Nashville, Bowling Green, and Clarksville-Hopkinsville areas. The station is owned and licensed by Midwest Communications. Its studios are located in south central Nashville near the Tennessee State Fairgrounds and the transmitter site is located in the far western portion of Nashville.

== History ==
After more than a decade of technical and legal wrangling, the station went on the air in 1976 as easy listening WZEZ. On April 20, 1994, the station's call letters changed to WJXA, and moved to a more generic adult contemporary/light rock format as easy listening's relevance faded. It has never wavered from this format since, featuring a mix of both current hits, along with songs back to the mid-70s, which is both "office-safe" and marketed towards women, often being the only adult contemporary station in mid-Tennessee.

Despite Nashville being thought of outside the market as a music hub dominated by various country music radio stations, WJXA has remained the top-rated station in the market for decades. The station's success would eventually lead its owners to switch its sister station in Knoxville to the same general format as WJXB-FM in 2002, also a long-time easy-listening station converted to adult contemporary, and with the same market-leading ratings.

Owned by South Central Communications for decades, the Wisconsin-based Midwest Communications would acquire most of its stations in September 2014, including WJXA, WJXB and WCJK, for $72 million, with no changes to WJXA's format outside regular staff attrition since then.

== See also ==
- List of Nashville media
