= WQQK =

Radio station in Goodlettsville, Tennessee

Coordinates: 36.297278°N 86.753056°W

Goodlettsville, Tennessee; United States
- Broadcast area: Nashville, Tennessee
- Frequency: 92.1 MHz (HD Radio)
- Branding: 92Q

Programming
- Format: Urban adult contemporary
- Affiliations: Compass Media Networks

Ownership
- Owner: Cumulus Media Inc.; (Cumulus Licensing LLC)
- Sister stations: WGFX, WKDF, WSM-FM, WWTN

History
- First air date: October 16, 1970; 55 years ago
- Former call signs: WHVT (1970–197?); WBYQ (197?–1981); WMAK-FM (1981–1984)
- Call sign meaning: The "Q" from WQQK is used in 92Q branding

Technical information
- Licensing authority: FCC
- Facility ID: 52521
- Class: A
- ERP: 3,500 watts
- HAAT: 133 meters (436 ft)

Links
- Public license information: Public file; LMS
- Webcast: Listen live
- Website: 92qnashville.com

WQQK (92.1 FM) is an urban adult contemporary radio station broadcasting in Nashville, Tennessee. Its transmitter is located in Goodlettsville, Tennessee (its city of license), and its studios are in Nashville's Music Row district.

WQQK broadcasts in HD.

== History ==
The station first signed on October 16, 1970, as WHVT, licensed to Hendersonville Broadcasting Corporation, according to FCC records. The studios were at 361 Main Street in Hendersonville, Tennessee, with transmitter facilities on Campbell Road in Goodlettsville, Tennessee. The transmitter remains in the same location today.

Throughout much of the 1970s, the station held the call letters WBYQ and was branded as "92Q". The station pioneered the "Top 40/CHR" format on the FM dial in the Nashville market.

On July 1, 1981, WBYQ changed its call letters to WMAK-FM. On May 17, 1982, FCC records show the station's license was transferred from Hendersonville Broadcasting Corporation to Phoenix of Hendersonville, Inc. (Samuel H. Howard). In late fall 1982, WMAK-FM adopted an urban contemporary format.

On January 31, 1984, the station's call letters were changed to WQQK, and the "92Q" branding was relaunched while retaining the urban contemporary format. The late-night program The Quiet Storm began in 1984. Around this time, Phoenix Broadcasting moved WQQK's studios to the facilities of then-sister station WVOL, located just north of Downtown Nashville.

On August 8, 1997, Phoenix of Hendersonville, Inc, and WQQK were transferred from Samuel H. Howard to Dickey Brothers Broadcasting Corporation LLC, per FCC records. Since then, WQQK has been controlled by the Dickey family, who are also prominent figures in the Cumulus Media organization. In 2008, WQQK's city of license was changed from Hendersonville to Goodlettsville as part of a larger project in which four of Cumulus' five Nashville stations changed their cities of license.

On September 16, 2011, two of WQQK's sister stations, WRQQ and WNFN, were placed into an independent trust (Volt Radio, LLC) while Cumulus sought a buyer. The move was forced by FCC ownership limits following Cumulus' acquisition of Citadel Broadcasting, which resulted locally in WKDF and WGFX joining the Cumulus cluster. As of 2011, the FCC allows a single company to own a maximum of five FM stations and two AM stations in any given market. To meet these guidelines in Nashville, Cumulus was forced to divest two of its seven FM stations and chose WRQQ and WNFN, traditionally its two lowest-performing stations.

On November 14, 2011, Cumulus announced it was removing WRQQ from the Volt Radio trust, replacing it with WQQK. Following Cumulus' sale of WRQQ, Cumulus removed and retained WQQK from the trust on April 30, 2013.

Today, WQQK carries "The Kenny Smoov Morning Show" (who replaced Tom Joyner) in the mornings) and D. L. Hughley (who replaced Michael Baisden) in the afternoons. The station primarily plays R&B from the 1980s to the present, as well as classic hip-hop. While facing direct competition from WUBT, WQQK consistently garners one of the highest Arbitron ratings in the market despite broadcasting with only 3,500 watts of power.
