= WHIN =

- Gallatin, Tennessee; United States
- Broadcast area: Hendersonville, Tennessee
- Frequency: 1010 kHz
- Branding: WHIN 100.7 FM - 1010 AM

Programming
- Format: Adult contemporary

Ownership
- Owner: Anthony G. Didier; (Brayden Madison Broadcasting L.L.C.)

History
- First air date: August 8, 1948

Technical information
- Licensing authority: FCC
- Facility ID: 72188
- Class: AM and FM: D
- Power: AM: 5,000 watts day 47 watts night
- ERP: FM: 250 watts both directional
- Transmitter coordinates: 36°26′N 86°28′W
- Translators: 100.7 W264CR (Gallatin); 107.9 W300EA (Gallatin)

Links
- Public license information: Public file; LMS
- Webcast: Listen Live
- Website: whinradio.com

WHIN (1010 AM), licensed to Gallatin, Tennessee, is a radio station broadcasting an adult contemporary format. The station is owned by Brayden Madison Broadcasting L.L.C.

== History ==
Gallatin received its first radio station August 2, 1948, when WHIN went on the air. The 1,000-watt (daytime) station was owned by Sumner County Broadcasting Company.

Owned at one time by record mogul Randy Wood, the station still serves Sumner County. WHIN was joined by an FM station in December 1960 when 104.5 WFMG came on the air. The FM station has broadcast under many call letters, but probably its most famous days were in the late 1970s and 1980s when it was known as KX (pronounced Kicks) 104, a popular music station that battled with Nashville stations for top audience numbers. During that time, the station was owned by Ron Bledsoe, who for years had commanded CBS Records in Nashville, and who was a former employee of the station in his younger years. In 1984, the station was sold to Jack Williams and Seth (Skip) Sparkman as WHIN, Inc.

WHIN and its translator W264CR were sold in 2016 to Kensington Digital Media, which also owns WHPY-FM in the Nashville radio market, and in the following year it changed format from country music to adult hits. The sale, at a purchase price of $325,000, was consummated on March 30, 2017; both licenses were simultaneously reassigned to Brayden Madison Broadcasting L.L.C., an affiliate of Kensington Digital Media.

== FM translator ==
Call sign	Frequency	City of license	FID	ERP (W)	HAAT	Class	Transmitter coordinates	FCC info
W264CR	100.7 FM	Gallatin, Tennessee	145083	250	87 m (285 ft)	D	36°21′22.2″N 86°34′29″W	LMS
W300EA	107.9 FM	Gallatin, Tennessee	202604	250	152 m (499 ft)	D	36°28′5.2″N 86°28′41.0″W	LMS
