= WSM (AM) =

Radio station in Nashville, Tennessee

- Nashville, Tennessee; United States
- Broadcast area: Middle Tennessee
- Frequency: 650 kHz
- Branding: WSM Radio

Programming
- Format: Country music; Americana; bluegrass music
- Affiliations: Compass Media Networks; Grand Ole Opry; NBC News Radio; Premiere Networks

Ownership
- Owner: Opry Entertainment Group; (Joint venture of Ryman Hospitality Properties, NBCUniversal, and Atairos); (WSM-AM, LLC)

History
- First air date: October 5, 1925
- Former frequencies: 1060 kHz (1925–1927); 880 kHz (1927); 890 kHz (1927–1928)
- Call sign meaning: "We Shield Millions" (slogan of former owner, National Life & Accident Insurance Company)

Technical information
- Licensing authority: FCC
- Facility ID: 74066
- Class: A
- Power: 50,000 watts unlimited
- Transmitter coordinates: 35°59′50.2″N 86°47′32″W

Links
- Public license information: Public file; LMS
- Webcast: Listen live
- Website: wsmradio.com

WSM (650 kHz) is a commercial AM radio station, located in Nashville, Tennessee. It broadcasts a country music format (with classic country and Americana leanings) and is known as the home of the Grand Ole Opry, the world's longest running radio program. The station is owned by Opry Entertainment Group, a majority-held subsidiary of Ryman Hospitality Properties, Inc. The station broadcasts from studios adjacent to the Grand Ole Opry House.

Nicknamed "The Air Castle of the South", the station broadcasts with 50,000 watts around the clock from a facility in Brentwood, Tennessee. It has one of the largest daytime coverage areas in the country, providing at least grade B coverage as far southeast as Chattanooga, as far northwest as Evansville, Indiana, as far west as Jackson, Tennessee, and as far south as Huntsville, Alabama. At night, WSM's clear channel signal reaches much of North America and nearby countries. Because of its prominence in the pantheon of country music, and its near-nightly live broadcasts of the Grand Ole Opry, the station regularly reaches a worldwide audience via its internet stream.

WSM is the National Primary Entry Point (PEP) for the Emergency Alert System (EAS) in Middle Tennessee and the southwestern portion of Indiana.

== History ==
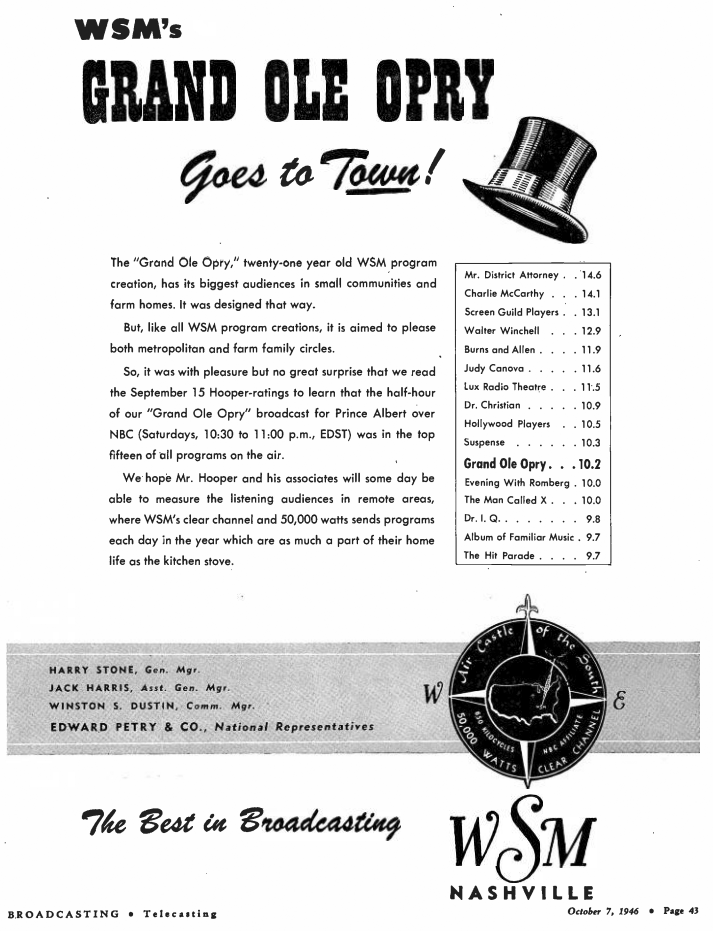
1946 advertisement for the station's long-running "Grand Ole Opry" broadcasts

Founded by the National Life and Accident Insurance Company as a platform to sell the company's insurance products, WSM first signed on October 5, 1925. The call letters were derived from the company's motto, "We Shield Millions". Studios were first located in the company's building on Seventh Avenue and Union Street in downtown Nashville; this was the original home of the Opry, until 1934.

WSM is associated with the popularization of country music through its weekly Saturday night program, the Grand Ole Opry, the longest-running radio program in history. The Opry began as the WSM Barn Dance on November 28, 1925, with Uncle Jimmy Thompson as the first performer. George D. Hay, a newspaper reporter from Memphis, was WSM's first program director. On December 10, 1927, Hay is quoted as saying "For the past hour we have been listening to music largely from Grand Opera, but from now on we will present 'The Grand Ole Opry'", contrasting the preceding program on the NBC Red Network with WSM's local broadcast.

The station traditionally played country music in the nighttime hours, when listeners from around the United States would tune in. During daytime hours, the station broadcast long-form radio, including both local and NBC network programs, in addition to music. WSM is credited with helping shape Nashville into a recording industry capital. Because of WSM's wide reach, musical acts from all across the eastern United States came to Nashville in the early decades of the station's existence, in hopes of getting to perform on WSM. Three WSM engineers founded Nashville's first commercial recording studio, Castle Recording Laboratory (named in honor of WSM's moniker "The Air Castle Of The South") in 1946, establishing the city as a recording center. Over time, as more acts and recording companies came to Nashville, the city became known as the center of the country music industry. Disc jockey David Cobb is credited with first referring to Nashville as "Music City USA", a designation that has since been adopted as the city's official nickname by the local tourism board.

On November 11, 1928, the Federal Radio Commission implemented General Order 40, which assigned WSM to a frequency of 650 kHz, as Tennessee's sole "clear channel" allocation. In 1932, the station boosted its power to 50,000 watts. During the Ohio River flood of 1937, when rival clear channel station WHAS's Louisville lost antennae transmission power, its studio feed was received by WSM via telephone, which broadcast emergency flood reports for three days for the lower Ohio River. On September 30, 1950, WSM added a television sister station on channel 4, operating as a primary NBC affiliate; WSM-TV was Nashville's first TV station.

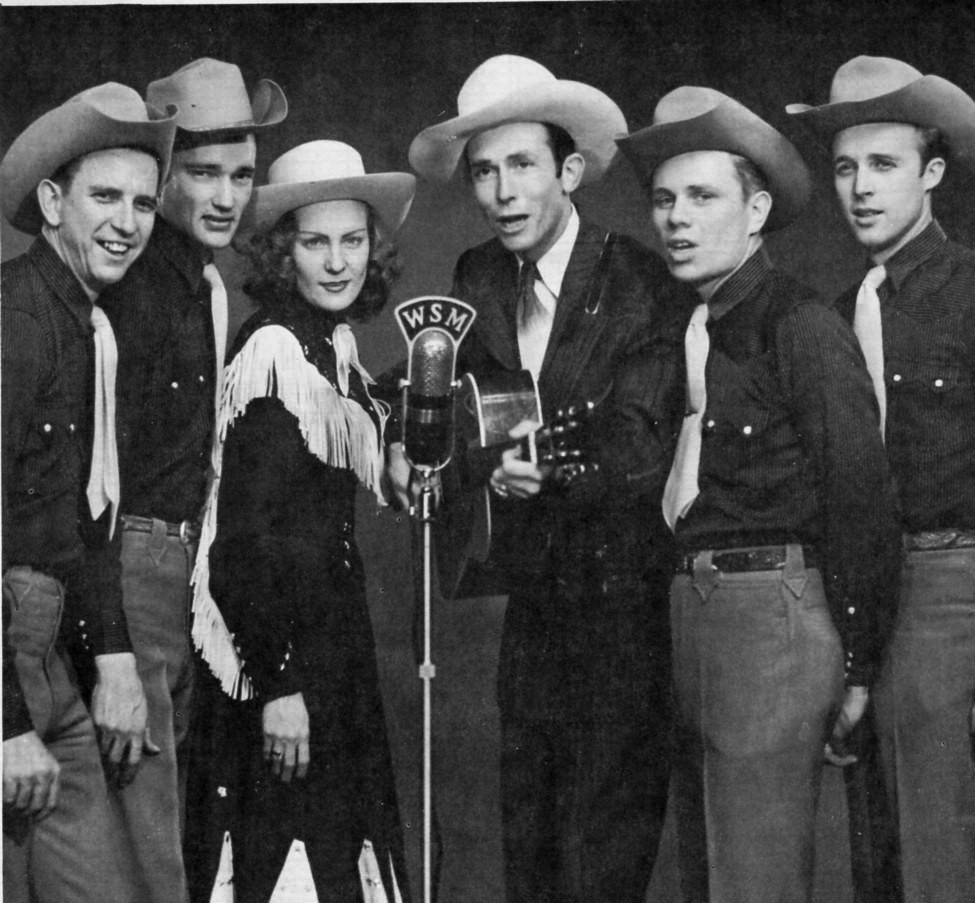
Hank Williams and the Drifting Cowboys performing at WSM in 1951

The studios remained in its original location until the mid-1960s, when the company built a new headquarters building downtown and new studios for WSM-TV on Knob Road in west Nashville adjacent to the newly constructed TV tower. Upon completion of the new headquarters, National Life and Accident Insurance Company chose to relocate WSM radio to their new TV studios, and WSM radio, joined in 1968 by its new FM sister, broadcast from that location from 1966 to 1983. For most of its history, WSM, along with WSM-TV and the Grand Ole Opry, was owned by the Nashville-based National Life and Accident Insurance Company. In 1974, National Life and Accident Insurance Company reorganized itself as a holding company, NLT Corporation, with the WSM stations as one of the major subsidiaries.

After television became popular (thus largely eliminating the audience for full-length radio programs), WSM adopted a middle of the road (MOR) music format during the daytime hours, and continued to play country music at night. It was not until 1980 that WSM adopted the 24-hour country music format of today.

In 1981, the American General Corporation (now part of the American International Group) bought NLT. At one time, American General was the parent company of the Life and Casualty Insurance Company based in Nashville, former owner of WSM-TV rival WLAC-TV (now WTVF), and WLAC-AM-FM, but divested the broadcast properties in 1975, long before the NLT merger. American General was not interested in NLT's non-insurance operations, and sold WSM, Inc. (which included Opryland Hotel, Opryland USA, Ryman Auditorium, The Grand Ole Opry, the fledgling The Nashville Network cable television outlet, WSM-FM, and WSM) to Gaylord Broadcasting Company. WSM-TV, due to FCC ownership limits of the era, was sold instead to Gillett Broadcasting and changed its callsign to WSMV-TV. However, there was still considerable overlap between the stations' on-air personnel for some years after the ownership change. Gaylord would also move the WSM radio stations to new facilities at the Opryland Hotel (now Gaylord Opryland), departing their shared building on Knob Road, which still houses WSMV today.

WSM broadcast in the C-QUAM format of AM stereo, which could be heard over several states at night, from 1982 until 2000.

In 2001, management had sought to capitalize on the success of sister station WWTN's sports trappings by converting WSM to an all-sports format. Word was leaked to other media resulting in protests, including longtime Opry personalities and country music singers, outside the station's studios. Management eventually made the decision to keep the station's classic country format.

In 2003, WSM-FM and WWTN, sister stations to WSM, were sold to Cumulus Media. Cumulus intended to purchase WSM as well, but Gaylord decided to maintain ownership at the eleventh hour. Through a five-year joint sales agreement, however, Gaylord paid Cumulus a fee to operate WSM's sales department and provide news updates for the station. Gaylord Entertainment continued to control WSM and operate all other departments, including programming, engineering, and promotions. The agreement ended in 2008, at which point all control of the station reverted to Gaylord. In 2012, Gaylord Entertainment Company was reorganized into a real estate investment trust and was renamed Ryman Hospitality Properties. The radio station became held within its subsidiary, Opry Entertainment Group. Ryman sold minority stakes in OEG to NBCUniversal and Atairos in April 2022, but spun WSM's license off into a subsidiary that remained separate from that transaction and wholly owned by Ryman.

From 2002 until 2006, the station was a choice on Sirius Satellite Radio, which carried a full-time simulcast of WSM's signal, except during NASCAR races. Briefly in 2006, the channel converted to "WSM Entertainment", a separate satellite radio feed that carried the same classic country music format as the AM signal. About a year after the channel was eliminated, then-rival XM Satellite Radio announced the carriage of the Grand Ole Opry on Nashville! channel 11 beginning in October 2007, as well as the Eddie Stubbs Show on America channel 10 beginning in November 2007. After the merger between Sirius and XM, WSM's channel was eliminated, but Opry broadcasts continued to air on other channels within the service.

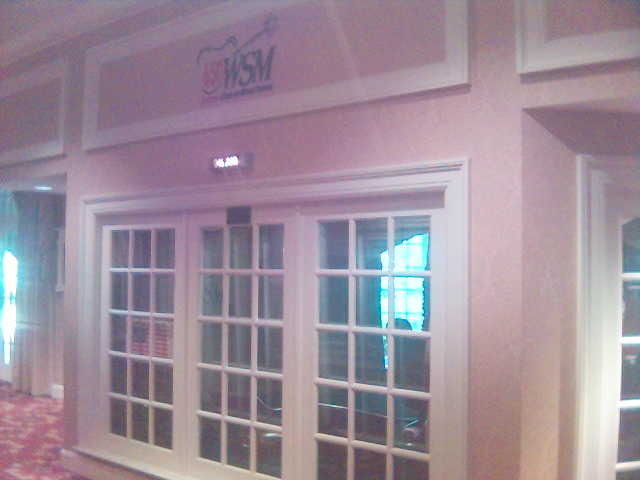
WSM's "fishbowl" studio inside the Gaylord Opryland hotel, from which the station operated between 1990 and 2024.

Following the devastating 2010 Tennessee flood that inundated Gaylord Opryland and the Grand Ole Opry House, the station broadcast from a makeshift studio at its transmitter site for six months, while the Grand Ole Opry rotated between several performance sites, until the buildings at the Opryland complex were repaired. WSM's administrative offices next door to the Grand Ole Opry House were completely destroyed by the flood, resulting in the loss of several priceless documents from the station's history, and were later demolished.

In 2024, WSM vacated its longstanding studio inside the Magnolia Lobby of Gaylord Opryland Resort & Convention Center, and moved to a new showcase studio inside a custom home originally built for country music legend Roy Acuff on the grounds of the Grand Ole Opry House. Portions of the building, including a small museum devoted to the station's history, are accessible to visitors who take the Grand Ole Opry House Backstage Tour.

Ryman Hospitality Properties announced its intent to seek further investment in June 2026 for Opry Entertainment Group, including WSM, as well as the company's stake in the Opry, Ryman Auditorium, the Grand Ole Opry House, and its related restaurant/bar business.

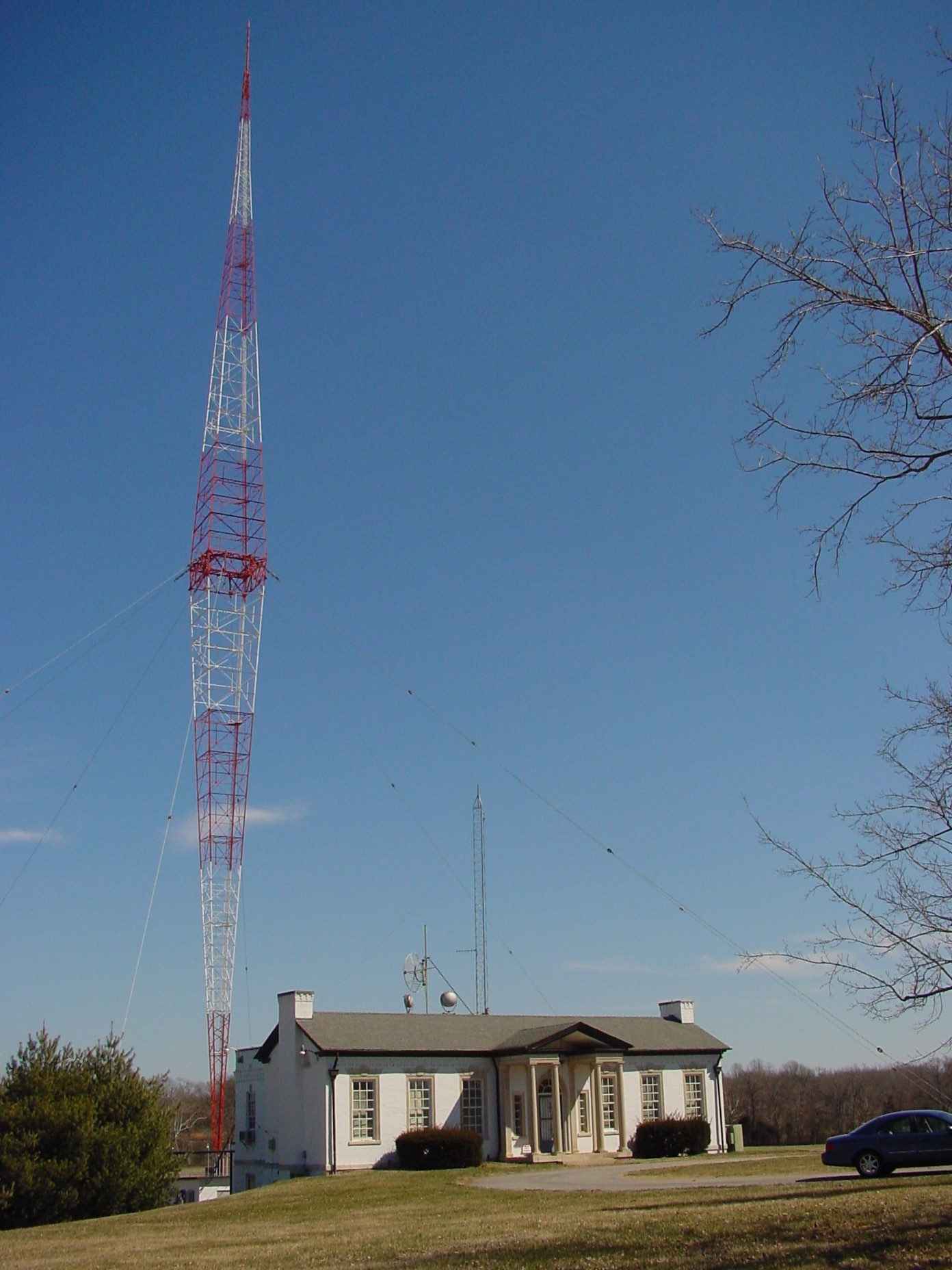
WSM's transmitter facility and Blaw-Knox tower, located just south of Nashville along Interstate 65 in Brentwood, Tennessee

=== Awards and recognition ===
In 1996, the station was named Radio Station of the Year at the International Bluegrass Music Awards. In 2000, the station was named "Country Station of the Century" by industry publication Radio & Records. In 2008, it received a prestigious Marconi Award from the National Association of Broadcasters, considered the radio industry's highest honor. In 2026, the Tennessee Association of Broadcasters named WSM its Large Market Station of the Year.

== Transmitter tower ==
WSM's unusual diamond-shaped transmitting antenna (manufactured by Blaw-Knox) is visible from Interstate 65 just south of Nashville (in Brentwood) and is one of the area's landmarks. It is located near the I-65 exit 71 interchange with Concord Road (State Highway 253). When the tower was built in 1932, it was 878 feet (267.6m) tall and was the tallest antenna in North America. Its height was reduced to 808 feet (246 m) in 1939 when it was discovered that the taller tower was causing self-cancellation in the "fringe" areas of reception of the station (it is now known that 195 electrical degrees, about 810 feet, is the optimum height for a Class A station on that frequency). For a period during World War II it was designated to provide transmissions to submarines in the event that ship-to-shore communications were lost. It is now one of the oldest operating broadcast towers in the United States.

As a tribute to the station's centrality in country music history, the diamond antenna design was incorporated into the new Country Music Hall of Fame and Museum's design in 2001. The tower was listed in the National Register of Historic Places on March 15, 2011.

== Alumni ==
- Teddy Bart, a Nashville broadcaster of long tenure, began as a singer on shows like Waking Crew and parlayed his skills into hosting that show, an afternoon drive-time program with Larry Munson in the early 1960s and Nashville's first-ever call-in talk show, which ran from 1969 to 1981. He also hosted WSM-TV's Noon Show in the 1970s and anchored WKRN-TV's newscast briefly in the early 1980s before launching the group-discussion radio talk show Roundtable on WLAC in 1985, a show that ran for 20 years on several different stations.
- Keith Bilbrey moved to Nashville in 1974 to begin working for WSM, first as a substitute announcer for WSM-FM and then as a full-time disc jockey on WSM's AM and FM stations. Throughout his career, Bilbrey worked every single time slot at WSM and became an iconic voice in the modern history of the station and was truly a fan favorite. In 1982, Bilbrey began announcing on The Grand Ole Opry. When The Nashville Network (TNN) began televising a 30-minute portion of the show in 1985, the young announcer became the first host of Grand Ole Opry Live. Bilbrey hosted Opry Live, along with the Opry warm-up show, Backstage Live, until TNN stopped airing the show in 2000. He also hosted the Opry warm-up show on WSM. His 35-year career at the station ended in 2009.
- Bill Cody hosted mornings on the station from 1994 until his death in 2026, minus a brief period in the late 1990s when his show was moved to then-sister station WSM-FM before ultimately returning to the AM signal. Cody was revered for his easygoing interview style and his close friendships with artists and musicians spanning generations. His program, "Coffee, Country, and Cody", was at times simulcast on television on the Heartland and Circle networks. He was also a regular host of the Opry in the latter years of his tenure. Cody became a Country Radio Hall of Fame inductee in 2008, received a star on Nashville's "Music City Walk of Fame" in 2024, and was posthumously inducted into the Tennessee Radio Hall of Fame in 2026 (an honor announced before his death).
- Ralph Emery served as the overnight host of WSM from the late 1950s until the early 1970s. Because of his time slot, listeners all over the U.S. could hear Emery spin country music records. This and The Grand Ole Opry solidified WSM's central role in the history of country music. In the 1980s, Emery gained further national fame as the host of Nashville Now! on The Nashville Network; before then, he hosted syndicated radio and television country music interview shows, and a long-running, highly rated morning show on WSMV-TV.
- Sondra Locke joined the WSM staff in late 1963 or early 1964 as secretary to operations manager Tom Griscom. She left in 1965 to work for WSM-TV.
- Larry Munson was a sportscaster for the Nashville Vols, Vanderbilt Commodores men's basketball and Vanderbilt Commodores football in the 1950s and 1960s, as well as working for WSM-TV. He was later renowned for his long tenure as the legendary voice of Georgia Bulldogs football.

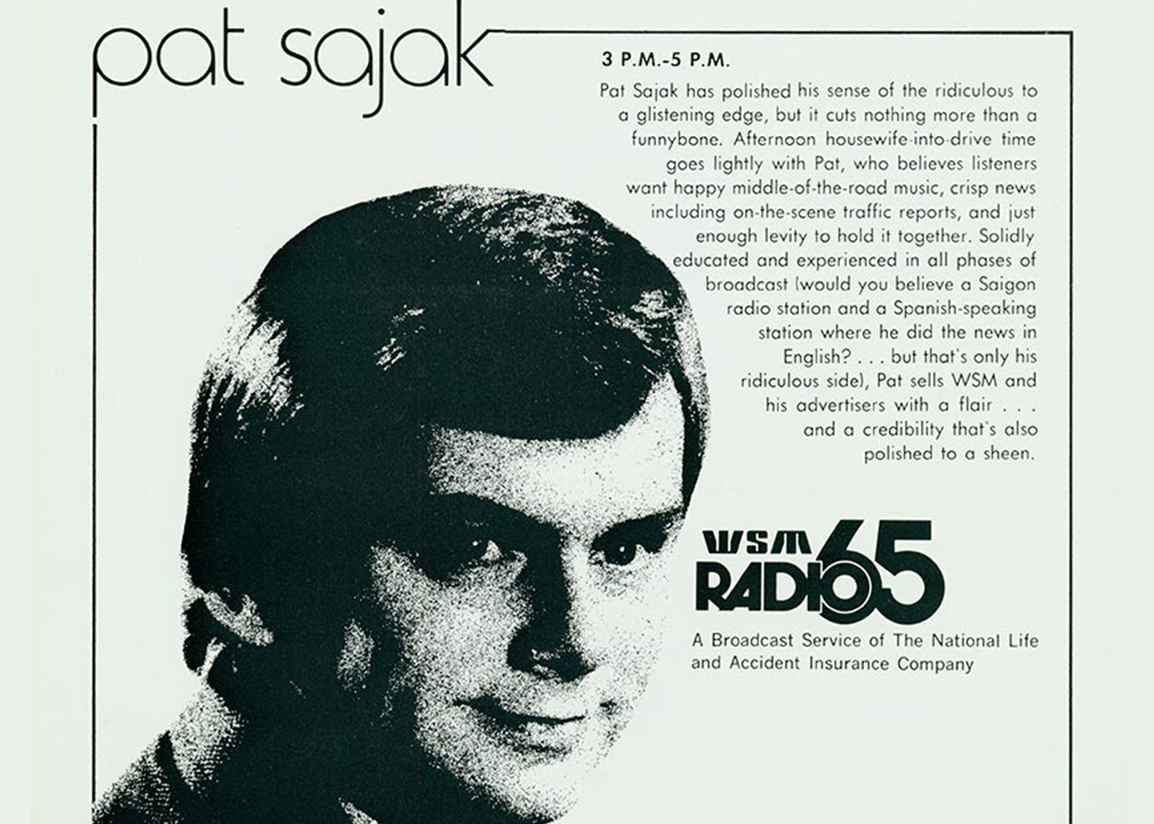
Ad for Pat Sajak, the station's then-afternoon host, c. 1970s

- Pat Sajak (host of Wheel of Fortune) served as the afternoon DJ on WSM during the mid-1970s. During that time, he also worked as a weekend weathercaster and substitute talk show host on WSM-TV.
- Eddie Stubbs was the station's evening host and hosted of the Grand Ole Opry from 1995 until his retirement in 2020.
- Ernest Tubb hosted a Midnite Jamboree from his eponymous record shop following each episode of the Opry from 1947 until his death. The Midnite Jamboree continued to be independently produced by the establishment after his death, using the airtime to promote its mail-order retail business. The program was officially discontinued in January 2026, following several years of instability among the record shop's ownership.
- Grant Turner (born Jesse Granderson Turner) was known as the "dean of the Opry announcers" and had a nearly 50-year association with the station, also announcing country music programs in the early morning hours. His show was so popular that NL&AI used its title, Opryland USA, as the name for the theme park built in 1972.

== Former sister stations ==
In 1939, WSM began operating an experimental high-frequency, high-fidelity AM "Apex" station, W4XA, on 26.15 MHz. (Note: The "4" in W4XA's call sign indicated that it was located in the 4th radio district, while the "X" reflected its operation as an experimental station.) This was replaced in 1941 by a commercial FM station, initially with the call sign W47NV (Note: The initial policy for commercial FM station call signs included an initial "W" for stations located east of the Mississippi River, followed by the last two digits of a station's frequency assignment, "47" in this case, and closing with a one or two character city identifier, which for Nashville stations was "NV".) and operating on 44.7 MHz. This was reported to be first commercial FM to be fully licensed; although a few FM stations had begun broadcasting earlier, they were operating under experimental or "Special Temporary Authorizations" and had not yet been granted operating licenses. In 1943 the call sign was changed to WSM-FM, however the station was shut down in 1951. Its antenna is still mounted atop the Blaw Knox tower at Brentwood.

Seventeen years later the current incarnation of WSM-FM was established after a National Life subsidiary purchased WLWM and renamed it WSM-FM in 1968. This WSM-FM (95.5 MHz) was WSM's sister until 2008, when Cumulus Media, the full owner of WSM-FM since 2003, ended its joint sales agreement with the AM station. Despite having the same base call sign, the two stations are no longer related; incidentally, both the current WSM-FM on 95.5 MHz and the current occupant of the 103.3 frequency vacated by the original WSM-FM, WKDF, are now sister stations, with each separately broadcasting a country music format.

Television channel 4 (originally WSM-TV, and now WSMV-TV), was started by WSM, Inc. in 1950 and sold to George N. Gillett Jr. in 1981.

== Programming ==
WSM's programming is anchored by its live broadcasts of the Grand Ole Opry on Saturday nights, of which it has not missed a weekly broadcast since the show's inception in 1925. The only time the Opry has not broadcast live on a Saturday night was April 6, 1968 (two days after the assassination of Martin Luther King, Jr.), when Nashville instituted a county-wide curfew, preventing the show from hosting its scheduled performance at Ryman Auditorium. WSM, however, broadcast an archived Opry performance that evening, keeping the show's uninterrupted streak alive and airing a rerun for the only time in the program's history. The Opry also produces regular shows on Tuesdays and Fridays, with other nights of the week added seasonally as ticket demand fluctuates. WSM airs all of these performances live, as scheduled.

Outside of its Opry broadcasts, the station broadcasts a country music format. In contrast to Nashville's three FM country outlets, WSM's music selection leans more toward classic country and Americana, with a heavy focus placed upon music from Opry members and artists who frequently appear on the program as guest performers. Current air personalities on the station include Kelly Sutton, Charlie Mattos, Annie Ney, Mike Terry, Eryn Cooper, David Reed, Lexi Carter, Zack Bennett, and Amber Anderson.

Among WSM's current syndicated affiliations are The Crook and Chase Countdown and Into The Blue with Terry Herd, as well as two independent syndicated programs featuring the station's personalities: Y'all Access with Kelly Sutton and Pure American Country, hosted by Zack Bennett.

The station also broadcasts exclusive monthly programs hosted by artists and musicians each Sunday night. Participating artists include Charlie Worsham, Dom Flemons, Chuck Mead, and Wild Ponies. The station also broadcasts a weekly slip-note piano program on Sundays hosted by Jason Coleman, grandson of late Country Music Hall of Fame and Rock and Roll Hall of Fame pianist Floyd Cramer.

In 2017, WSM launched "Route 650", a full-time Americana music streaming station available via its website, mobile app and services like TuneIn. In 2018, WSM launched "Opry Nashville Radio" (since renamed "Opry 100 Radio"), a full-time streaming station billed as being "based on the Grand Ole Opry and Nashville lifestyle" and focusing mainly on contemporary country music. During December, this channel flips to all Christmas music. In 2025, the station launched a third streaming-only station: "Legends of Country Radio", broadcasting classic country music and the voices of members of the Country Radio Hall of Fame.

The station broadcasts NBC News-branded reports from iHeartMedia at the top of each hour, and partners with former sister station WSMV-TV for local news and weather updates throughout its broadcast day.

== See also ==
Previous WSM logo, retired in 2021

- List of Nashville media
- Grand Ole Opry
- Circle
- List of radio stations in Tennessee
- List of three-letter broadcast call signs in the United States
