= WCJK =

Radio station in Murfreesboro–Nashville, Tennessee

Coordinates: 36.264°N 86.794°W

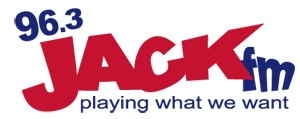
- Murfreesboro, Tennessee; United States
- Broadcast area: Nashville metropolitan area
- Frequency: 96.3 MHz
- Branding: 96.3 Jack FM

Programming
- Format: Adult hits
- Affiliations: Jack FM network

Ownership
- Owner: Midwest Communications, Inc.
- Sister stations: WJXA, WNFN

History
- First air date: August 10, 1963 (63 years ago) (as WMTS-FM)
- Former call signs: WMTS-FM (1963–1977); WKOS (1977–1984); WZKS (1984–1985); WTMG (1985–1988); WRMX (1988–2000); WMAK (2000–2004); WMAK-FM (2004–2005)
- Call sign meaning: We're Crazy Like JacK!

Technical information
- Licensing authority: FCC
- Facility ID: 61053
- Class: C1
- ERP: 39,000 watts
- HAAT: 432 meters (1417 ft)

Links
- Public license information: Public file; LMS
- Webcast: Listen live
- Website: 963jackfm.com

WCJK (96.3 FM) is a commercial radio station licensed to Murfreesboro, Tennessee, and serving the Nashville metropolitan area. It airs an adult hits radio format and is owned by Midwest Communications, Inc. It subscribes to the nationally syndicated Jack FM service.

WCJK has an effective radiated power of 39,000 watts. The transmitter is on Trail Hollow Lane, near Interstate 24, in the Whites Creek neighborhood of Nashville. The studios and offices are located on Rosedale Avenue in south central Nashville near the Tennessee State Fairgrounds arena.

== History ==
=== Early years ===
On August 10, 1963, the station signed on the air as WMTS-FM. It was built by partners Arthur Smith, Jr., who served as the president, and Arthur Trimm, who served as general manager. At first, it was a simulcast of sister station WMTS (AM 860, now WMGC), using the initials of the owners' surnames along with the city of Murfreesboro. It was by sheer coincidence that the call sign matched the initials of the local college, Middle Tennessee State.

WMTS-AM-FM were sold by Arthur Smith Jr. to Joyce Ehrhart in August 1964 for $175,000. Her husband, Jack Ehrhart became President and ran the stations for a couple of years. They hosted an open house on the 11th anniversary of the station. They sold the stations in the late 1960s.

=== Top 40, AC and Oldies ===
The stations were sold to Tom Perryman in 1976, and then purchased by local sportscaster and station employee Monte Hale in 1977. On May 26, 1980, Hale changed the call letters to WKOS and branded the station "96 KOS" after changing the format to Top 40. Battling cancer, in 1981 Hale sold the AM and FM stations shortly before his death to John McCreery.

McCreery later changed the call sign to WZKS (96 Kiss). WZKS switched to an adult contemporary format, first as WTMG "Magic 96" in 1985, and then as WRMX "WMIX" in 1988. It played the "best mix of the 60s, 70s, and 80s."

In 1990, the station converted to an oldies format consisting of hits mostly recorded between the late 1950s and early 1970s. Eventually, the station was purchased by South Central Communications, separating it from the 810 AM. Later, the call letters were changed to WMAK-FM, reviving the call sign of a popular Top 40 AM station of the late 1960s and early 1970s.

=== Jack FM ===
On May 12, 2005, the format was abruptly switched to the "Jack FM" format, featuring an expanded, less-structured playlist, including rock hits from the 1980s and 90s, but with occasional unusual songs or novelty hits of the last 40 years. Reflecting the new Jack-FM format, the call letters were changed to the current WCJK.

It was announced on May 28, 2014, that Midwest Communications would purchase 9 of the 10 Stations owned by South Central Communications. (This includes WCJK and sister station WJXA.) With this purchase, Midwest Communications expanded its portfolio of stations to Evansville, Knoxville and Nashville. The sale was finalized on September 2, 2014, at a price of $72 million.
