= WVOL =

- Berry Hill, Tennessee; United States
- Broadcast area: Nashville, Tennessee
- Frequency: 1470 kHz
- Branding: The Mighty 147

Programming
- Format: Urban oldies

Ownership
- Owner: Heidelberg Broadcasting, LLC

History
- First air date: 1951
- Former call signs: WSOK (1951–1957)
- Call sign meaning: Volunteer (state nickname)

Technical information
- Licensing authority: FCC
- Facility ID: 52522
- Class: B
- Power: 5,000 watts (day); 1,000 watts (night)
- Transmitter coordinates: 36°12′1″N 86°46′47″W

Links
- Public license information: Public file; LMS
- Webcast: Listen live
- Website: Official website

WVOL (1470 AM) is a radio station broadcasting an urban oldies format. Licensed to the Nashville suburb of Berry Hill, Tennessee, United States, the station serves the Nashville area. The station is currently owned by Heidelberg Broadcasting, LLC. The station and transmitter are co-located just north of downtown Nashville in the Cumberland Heights district.

By day, WVOL is powered at 5000 watts fed to two towers, but at night it cuts power to 1000 watts fed to all six towers within its array. Coverage is always focused toward the south of its transmitter site day and night, nighttime coverage is more heavily directed into Nashville than at daytime.

== History ==
The station was founded in 1951 as WSOK. The station was located on 4th Avenue N. in Downtown Nashville. WSOK originally was licensed as a daytime only station with 1,000 watts. WSOK was owned by Cal Young under Nashville Broadcasting Company according to FCC records. Songwriter and producer Ted Jarrett began his music career as one of the first disc jockeys on the station. In 1953, WSOK obtained a sister FM station on 105.9, and was WSOK-FM, which today is Nashville's WNRQ (owned by iHeart Media). WSOK's original format was rhythm and blues and urban gospel music. WSOK was the first station in the Nashville market to program primarily to the city's African-American community. Robert W. Rounsaville bought the station from Cal Young around 1957, the call letters were changed to WVOL, but the station continued its focus on the local African-American community. Roundsaville built WVOL a new studio and transmitter facility just north of the Downtown Nashville area, which included a daytime power increase to 5,000 watts with a two-tower directional pattern, and also adding nighttime service with 1,000 watts using a six tower directional pattern at the new facility. The new facility was put into operation around 1960. This facility is still in operation today.

In 1980, The Phoenix Communication Group, (Samuel H. Howard) acquired WVOL. In May 1982, Phoenix would acquire a sister FM for WVOL, that was WMAK-FM (formally WBYQ). In 1984 WMAK-FM would go back to the moniker name that made it famous "92Q" and call sign changed to WQQK. Around this time, 92Q, WQQK's studios was moved into the same building with WVOL just north of Downtown Nashville. In the spring of 1988, WVOL dropped live programming and affiliated with Satellite Music Network. The network, impressed with the station, launched a format based on WVOL's sound. WVOL aired satellite-fed programming until 1993. Around that time, the station was sold to Dickey Brothers Broadcasting.

In a transaction that closed in April 2000, WVOL was purchased by John Heidelberg, an African-American entrepreneur who was a former employee of both WVOL and WSM, from Dickey Brothers Broadcasting in exchange for cash and an FM construction permit that would later become WRQQ (now WLVU). WVOL's format was urban gospel during the day, and jazz overnight. In 1970, when Heidelberg was acting program director of WVOL, he was the first person to employ Oprah Winfrey, then a local high school student, as a broadcaster. Eventually becoming a news anchor on WVOL, Winfrey later launched her TV career as an anchor with WLAC-TV in Nashville, before becoming an iconic national talk show host.

WVOL switched to its current format of urban adult contemporary, urban oldies and talk shows in March 2001, however urban gospel music remained in place on Sundays.

In March 2011, WVOL suffered $1 million in damage when vandals cut the transmission lines to all six of the station's towers.
