= WSM-FM =

Radio station in Nashville, Tennessee

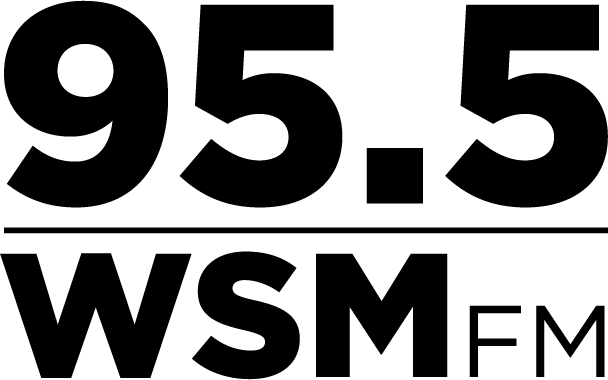
- Nashville, Tennessee; United States
- Broadcast area: Nashville, Tennessee
- Frequency: 95.5 MHz
- Branding: 95.5 WSM-FM

Programming
- Format: Country
- Affiliations: Westwood One

Ownership
- Owner: Cumulus Media; (Cumulus Licensing LLC)
- Sister stations: WKDF; WGFX; WQQK; WWTN

History
- First air date: November 1, 1962
- Former call signs: WLWM (1962–1968)
- Call sign meaning: From WSM (AM) (former sister station): "We Shield Millions" (slogan of former owner, National Life and Accident Insurance Company)

Technical information
- Licensing authority: FCC
- Facility ID: 74065
- Class: C
- ERP: 100,000 watts
- HAAT: 374.8 meters (1,229.7 ft)
- Transmitter coordinates: 36°8′27.2″N 86°51′56″W

Links
- Public license information: Public file; LMS
- Webcast: Listen live
- Website: www.955wsm.com

WSM-FM (95.5 MHz) is a radio station in Nashville, Tennessee. It broadcasts a country music format, with an emphasis on recordings released since the 1990s.

From 1967 until it was sold to Cumulus Media in 2003, WSM-FM was the sister of the clear-channel WSM (650 AM). Following the expiration of a subsequent five-year joint sales agreement with WSM in 2008, the two stations have had no further relationship. WSM-FM was also the sister to WSM-TV until the latter was sold in 1981 and became WSMV-TV. WSM-FM's transmitter remains at the WSMV-TV site in West Nashville; its studios are located in Nashville's Music Row district.

== History ==
WSM-FM began broadcasting on November 1, 1962, as WLWM, owned by C. Webber Parrish (d/b/a Barlane Broadcasting Corporation), a local Nashville businessman.

In late 1967 ownership of the station was transferred to WSM, Inc., a subsidiary of The National Life and Accident Insurance Company, owners of WSM (AM), and the station's call sign was officially changed to WSM-FM on November 6, 1968. This marked the return of the WSM-FM call sign after an absence of 17 years. In 1941, National Life had established the first fully licensed commercial FM station in the United States. Initially known as W47NV, this original WSM-FM was shut down in 1951 and its license returned to the Federal Communications Commission.

After a short period of simulcasting the AM station, beginning in 1969 WSM-FM returned to the easy listening format previously aired by WLWM.

=== "SM95" (1976–1983) ===
WSM-FM logo from the early '80s

In 1976, National Life changed WSM-FM to a soft rock playlist, branding the station "SM95".

=== Country music format (1983–present) ===
95.5 The Wolf logo 2008–2009

The ratings of SM95 began to decline—and thus its advertiser appeal—as its audience began aging in the early 1980s. By 1983, some four years after the conversion of the AM to a full-time country music format, management decided to bring the FM in line with the AM, and flipped the format to country (with an emphasis on current hits, instead of the AM's emphasis on oldies).

After the sale of WSM, Inc. to Gaylord Broadcasting, the new owner moved the studios of both AM and FM to an outlying building at the Opryland Hotel complex at that time, from their 1970s home on Knob Road in west Nashville, where former sister TV station WSMV-TV still operates today. In the 1990s, WSM-FM operated from a studio inside the now-defunct Opryland USA theme park, which visitors could view through a glass window. Following the theme park's demolition, the station moved into a renovated guestroom at Gaylord Opryland Resort & Convention Center. The station had an auxiliary studio at the Wildhorse Saloon downtown, and later at Opry Mills.

For most of the 1980s and 1990s, 95.5 FM was a highly competitive, yet usually No. 2 (behind rival WSIX-FM), country station. For much of the 1980s and 1990s, the station was branded as "Nashville 95". However, upon the arrival of a fourth country station in the market in 1999 (WKDF, which had played rock music since the 1970s), WSM-FM fell to a distant third place, and sometimes fell to fourth behind then-sister WSM.

In 2001, WSM-FM attempted to differentiate itself from the other FM country outlets by shifting to a format consisting mostly of live performances provided by the artists' labels or those within the WSM archives (such as Grand Ole Opry performances and in-studio appearances). The station was known during this era as "Live 95", and also simulcast the Opry live with WSM AM every Friday and Saturday night. After abandoning this approach to return to a traditional approach to programming, and until the end of the Gaylord era, the station was branded "Back to Back Country 95.5 WSM-FM".

In 2003, WSM-FM (along with sister news/talk/sports station WWTN) was sold to Cumulus Media. The lineup at the time consisted of Katie and Carp in the mornings, Frank Series in middays, David Hughes in afternoons (best known for his "Church day" antics on Wednesdays) and Su-Anna in evenings. The station continued to broadcast from a first-floor hotel room in the Gaylord hotel until mid-2004 under the direction of program director Lee Logan. The studios and offices were eventually moved to Cumulus' existing property on Music Circle East, in Nashville's Music Row district.

In September 2004, with new program director Jon Sebastian, the station adopted a revised country format (branded as "95.5 The Wolf") that included some Southern rock music. After some initial ratings success, the station fell to a consistent third place behind WKDF and WSIX, and a more traditional country approach was once again employed. New program director Buddy Van Aresdale took the helm. The ratings steadily increased before Van Aresdale left for greener pastures. Another program director, Kevin King, took charge, this time with "consultant" Jan Jeffries, a long-time friend of the Dickey family.

On December 16, 2010, while rival station WSIX-FM was in the midst of a reboot and stunting with nonstop Christmas music, WSM-FM itself relaunched, dropping "The Wolf" moniker. The station returned to using its heritage call letters, while offering a mainstream country playlist that included the top country hits of the day, as well as a heavy reliance on familiar hits dating back to the early 1990s.

In 2012, after the bankruptcy of Citadel Broadcasting and its subsequent merger with Cumulus, WSM-FM and rival WKDF became sister stations, operating from the same building, yet still competing for the same mainstream country audience. Their operations were streamlined in January 2014 with the hiring of a common program director. WKDF adopted Cumulus' "Nash FM" moniker and format in February 2014, six months ahead of a similar change to come on WSM-FM.

95.5 Nash Icon logo, 2015–2025

On August 15, 2014, the station rebranded as "95.5 Nash Icon", thus serving as the nominal flagship station of Cumulus' new Nash Icon brand, a spin-off of Nash FM that focused on more familiar traditional country titles ranging back to the 1980s, as well as a focus on new music by more traditional-sounding artists. The format minimized the amount of talking by the air personalities and placed a heavier emphasis on the variety and amount of music. The Nash Icon radio format was a by-product of a joint venture between Cumulus and Big Machine Records to launch and operate the Nash Icon Records label.

In January 2015, WSM-FM became syndicated nationally on Westwood One's offering of the Nash Icon format, which is distributed to several Cumulus Nash Icon-branded stations, as well as some non-Cumulus-owned subscribing stations. The personalities provide a generic non-live or local presence on the radio dial.

=== Grand Ole Opry schedule conflicts ===
In past years, when WSM had the rights to broadcast Vanderbilt Commodore football and basketball games and Atlanta Braves baseball, it had WSM-FM air them whenever they took place on Friday or Saturday nights, in order not to preempt the live Grand Ole Opry shows on AM 650. Until the end of the 2003–08 Cumulus operating agreement, WSM-FM also aired NASCAR broadcasts under the same circumstances.

== See also ==
- List of oldest radio stations
- List of three-letter broadcast call signs in the United States
