= WKDF =

Radio station in Nashville, Tennessee, US

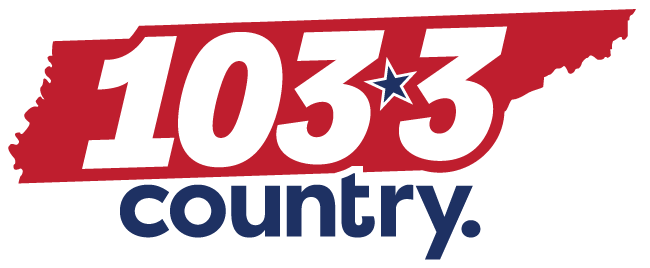
- Nashville, Tennessee; United States
- Broadcast area: Nashville metropolitan area
- Frequency: 103.3 MHz
- Branding: 103-3 Country

Programming
- Format: Country
- Affiliations: Compass Media Networks; Westwood One

Ownership
- Owner: Cumulus Media; (Radio License Holding CBC, LLC)
- Sister stations: WGFX, WQQK, WSM-FM, WWTN

History
- First air date: April 18, 1962
- Former call signs: WNFO-FM (1962–1965); WNFO (1965–1967); WKDA-FM (1967–1976)
- Call sign meaning: Differentiation from former sister station WKDA

Technical information
- Licensing authority: FCC
- Facility ID: 16896
- Class: C0
- ERP: 100,000 watts
- HAAT: 376 meters (1,234 ft)
- Transmitter coordinates: 36.035611°N 86.848889°W

Links
- Public license information: Public file; LMS
- Webcast: Listen live
- Website: www.1033country.com

WKDF (103.3 FM, "103.3 Country") is a commercial radio station licensed to Nashville, Tennessee, United States, and serving the Nashville metropolitan area. Owned by Cumulus Media, it features a country music format with studios in Nashville's Music Row district. WKDF is the flagship for the nationally-syndicated Big D & Bubba Morning Show.

WKDF's transmitter tower is on Johnson Chapel Road West in Brentwood, near the Little Harpeth River. The station also previously broadcast in HD Radio.

== History ==
=== WNFO-FM ===
The station signed on the air on April 18, 1962, as WNFO-FM, owned by the Hickory Broadcasting Corporation. It was the second commercial Nashville station to be assigned to 103.3 MHz, preceded by the original WSM-FM, which occupied this frequency from 1947 until it went off the air in 1951.

Despite several FM stations already operating in Nashville at the time, receivers for FM signals were not yet in widespread use. The relatively few listeners were not enough to attract advertisers. WNFO-FM left the air sometime around 1965.

=== WKDA-FM ===
WKDA 1240 AM, then one of the two Top 40-formatted stations in the market, began simulcasting on 103.3 MHz on January 1, 1967, as WKDA-FM. For the next three years, Nashville listeners could hear their favorite Top 40 hits on AM 1240 and FM 103.3.

In January 1970, WKDA-FM began playing freeform progressive rock, aimed especially at Nashville's large college student population. At first, the rock music was heard at night only, with the Top 40 hits from the AM station playing in the daytime. Then, beginning in March, WKDA-FM switched to rock all day. This lasted for about a year and a half.

For most of the late 1970s and early 80s, in the daytime, WKDA-AM-FM employed a mix of more mass-appeal rock and Top 40 music, while switching to harder-edged progressive rock at night. As the FM format grew, it soon became the dominant station of the two. Eventually the AM station changed to country music and in 1976 the FM station switched its callsign to WKDF.

=== WKDF ===
The FM station began calling itself "KDF". It became one of the top stations in the Nashville market as determined by the number of listeners reported by Arbitron, again thanks to its vast popularity among younger listeners. Although WKDF was challenged by competitor stations in the late 1980s into the mid-1990s, it continued to place first, second, or third with Arbitron during this period.

After a short stint with a hard rock format from 1992 to 1993, WKDF's format shifted to an active rock format in 1993, then alternative rock in 1996. In February 1997, the format was changed again to adult album alternative, which led to a precipitous fall in ratings from third in the market to 13th.

=== Flip to Country Music ===
By the late 1990s, the different rock formats saw continued ratings losses to competitor FM outlets. After nearly 30 years of programming some form of rock, WKDF reformatted to country music on April 1, 1999, a move that shocked many longtime Middle Tennessee listeners. It jumped into a three-way race for Nashville FM country listeners with established stations 95.5 WSM-FM and 97.9 WSIX-FM.

Originally going by the moniker "Music City 103", WKDF reverted to using its callsign in branding beginning in 2001. At first, the playlist featured a mixture of contemporary and classic country. But in recent years, it has become more contemporary, in contrast with co-owned WSM-FM, which concentrates on 1990s and 2000s country titles.

In September 2011, WKDF came under Cumulus Media ownership, as a result of the Cumulus acquisition of Citadel. That made WKDF a sister station to fellow Nashville country outlet WSM-FM. On February 3, 2014, WKDF, along with nine other Cumulus-owned country music stations, changed to the "Nash FM" branding that had been employed previously only by New York City outlet WNSH.

On May 14, 2020, WKDF rebranded as "103-3 Country". The station also provides network programming for Absolute Radio Country in the United Kingdom.

On Monday, October 18, 2021, WKDF became the new home station for the nationally syndicated Big D & Bubba Morning Show. It was previously heard in Nashville on rival station 97.9 WSIX-FM from 2003-2011. WSIX-FM now airs another nationally syndicated morning program based in Nashville, The Bobby Bones Show.

== Former logos ==
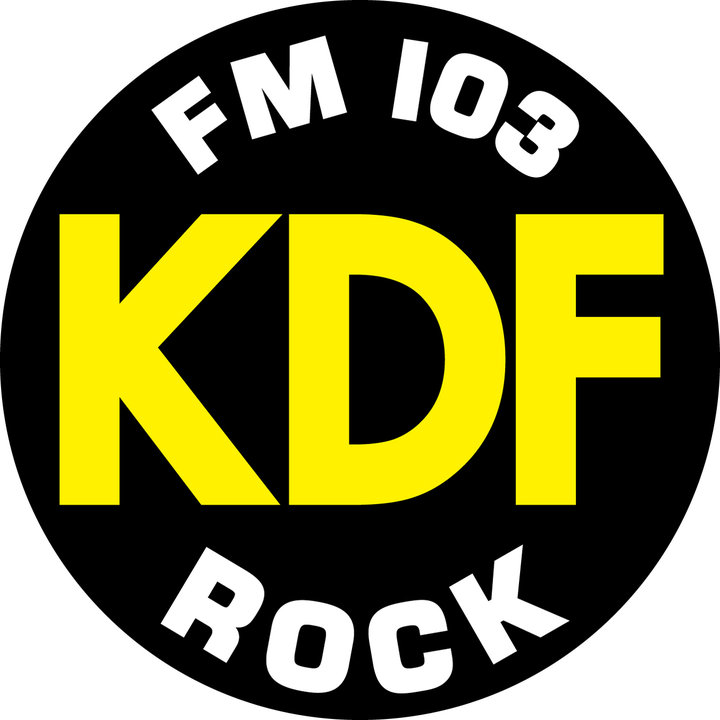
WKDF original logo, 1976-1985, direct variations of this logo were used until 1993

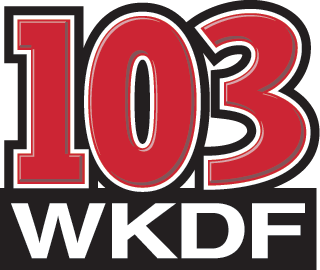
WKDF logo, 2001-2012

WKDF logo, 2012-2014, before switching to Nash FM

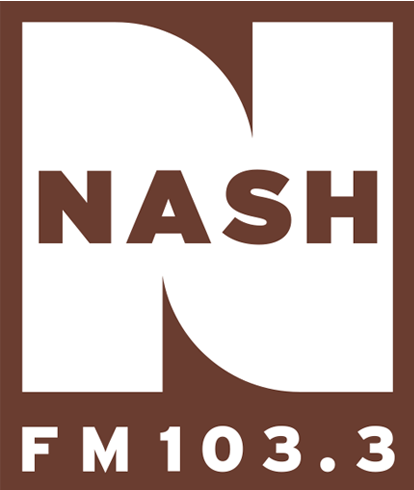
WKDF logo, 2014-2020, as Nash FM
