= Joseph Holman =

Joseph Holman may refer to:

- Joseph W. Holman (1890–1952), architect with Marr & Holman, Nashville, Tennessee
- Joseph George Holman (1764–1817), English actor and dramatist
