= Stripped Classicism =

Architectural style

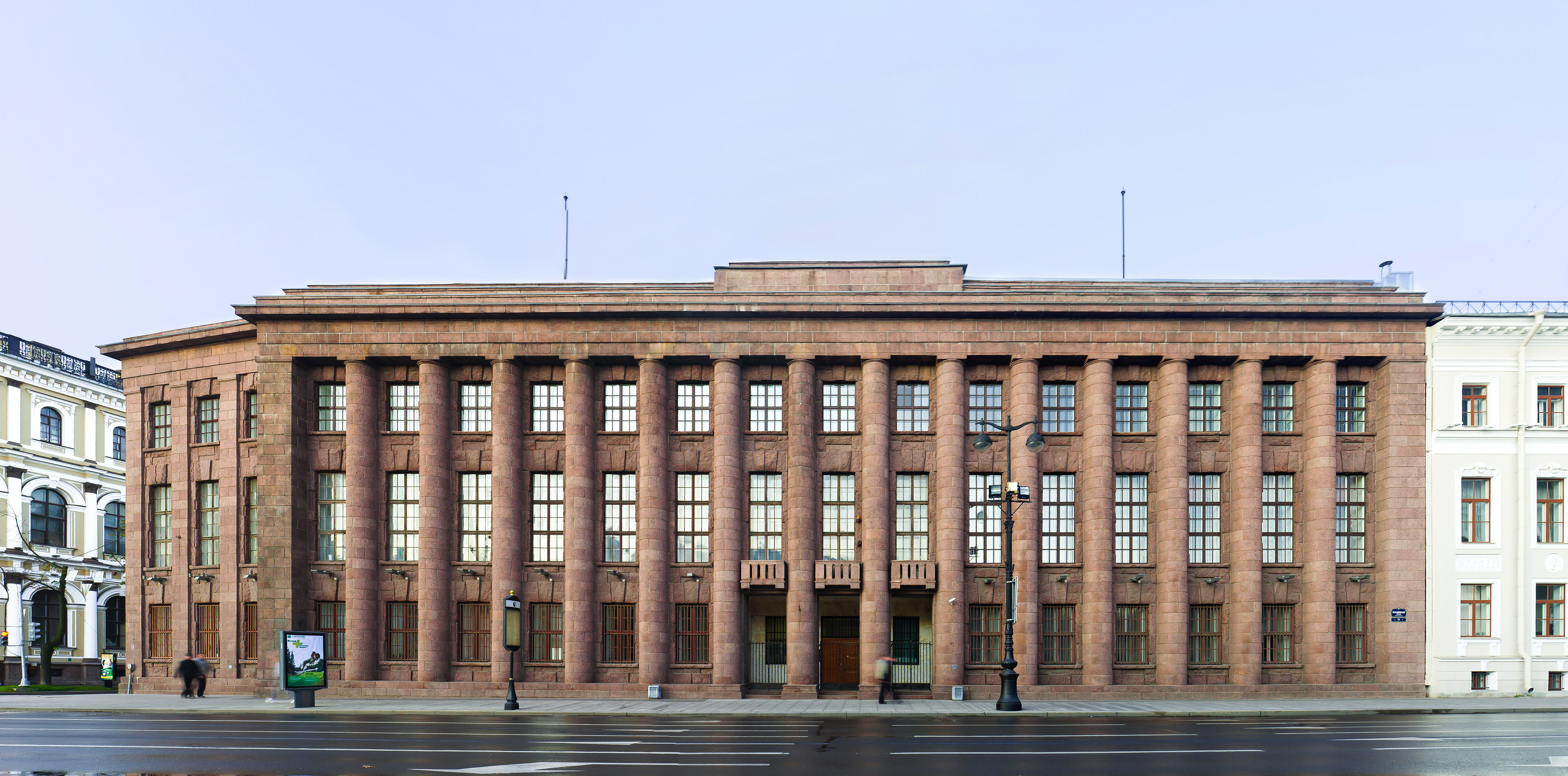
The German Imperial Embassy (designed 1911–1912) on Saint Isaac's Square in Saint Petersburg is considered the key template for Stripped Classicism. It was stripped still further when the large statues originally placed on the plinth on the roof were removed during World War I.

Victoria Palace, Bucharest, Romania, 1937–1944, by Duiliu Marcu

Stripped Classicism (also referred to as Starved Classicism or Grecian Moderne) is primarily a 20th-century classicist architectural style stripped of most or all ornamentation, frequently employed by governments while designing official buildings. It was adopted by both totalitarian and democratic regimes. (Note: "Stripped Classicism was a widely popular, international style of architecture during the inter-war period. It is best defined as a pared down version of classicism that blended the classical vocabulary with the ever-growing desire for abstraction... Due to its strong associations with totalitarian governments, it is often excluded from the canonic historical narrative of the modern movement. Recently a growing number of scholars have begun to question the traditional definition of modern architecture. If the discussion on modernism is expanding beyond the traditional canonical definition, a greater understanding of Stripped Classicism's place amongst the modern movement can be achieved.") The style embraces a "simplified but recognizable" classicism in its overall massing and scale while eliminating traditional decorative detailing. The orders of architecture are only hinted at or are indirectly implicated in the form and structure. (Note: Thus, for example, cuts might be substituted for moldings.)

Despite its etymological similarity, Stripped Classicism is sometimes distinguished from "Starved Classicism", the latter "displaying little feeling for rules, proportions, details, and finesse, and lacking all verve and élan". At other times the terms "stripped" and "starved" are used interchangeably.

Stripped Classicism was a materialistic manifestation of 'political' modernism. Recent historiography has explicitly linked this architectural style – and its relationship with modernist thinking – to political projects arising in the 1920–1930s, which utilised artistic dexterity to articulate – in built form – a powerful political ethos orientated towards the future.

Other writers have noted the need to read the impact of avant-garde movements such as the Italian Futurists, who extolled the innumerable possibilities of the modern world, on this unique style (and the futurism it espoused). It was popularised during the interwar years by the French-born Paul Philippe Cret, among others, and employed among elsewhere in Nazi Germany, Fascist Italy, the Soviet Union and United States.

== Description and history ==
Though the term is usually reserved for the more thorough style that forms part of 20th-century rational architecture, characteristics of Stripped Classicism are embodied in works of some progressive late 18th- and early 19th-century neoclassical architects, such as Étienne-Louis Boullée, Claude Nicolas Ledoux, Friedrich Gilly, Peter Speeth, Sir John Soane and Karl Friedrich Schinkel.

Between the World Wars, a stripped-down classicism became the de facto standard for many monumental and institutional governmental buildings all over the world. Governments used this architectural méthode to straddle modernism and classicism, an ideal political response to a modernizing world. In part, this movement was said to have origins in the need to save money in governmental works by eschewing the expense of hand-worked classical detail.

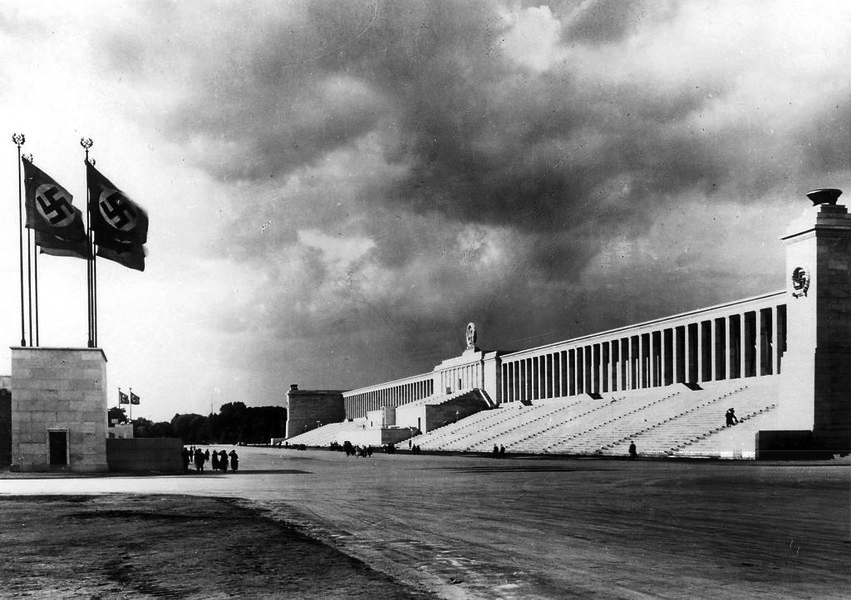
Albert Speer's Zeppelinfeld outside Nuremberg, in 1934

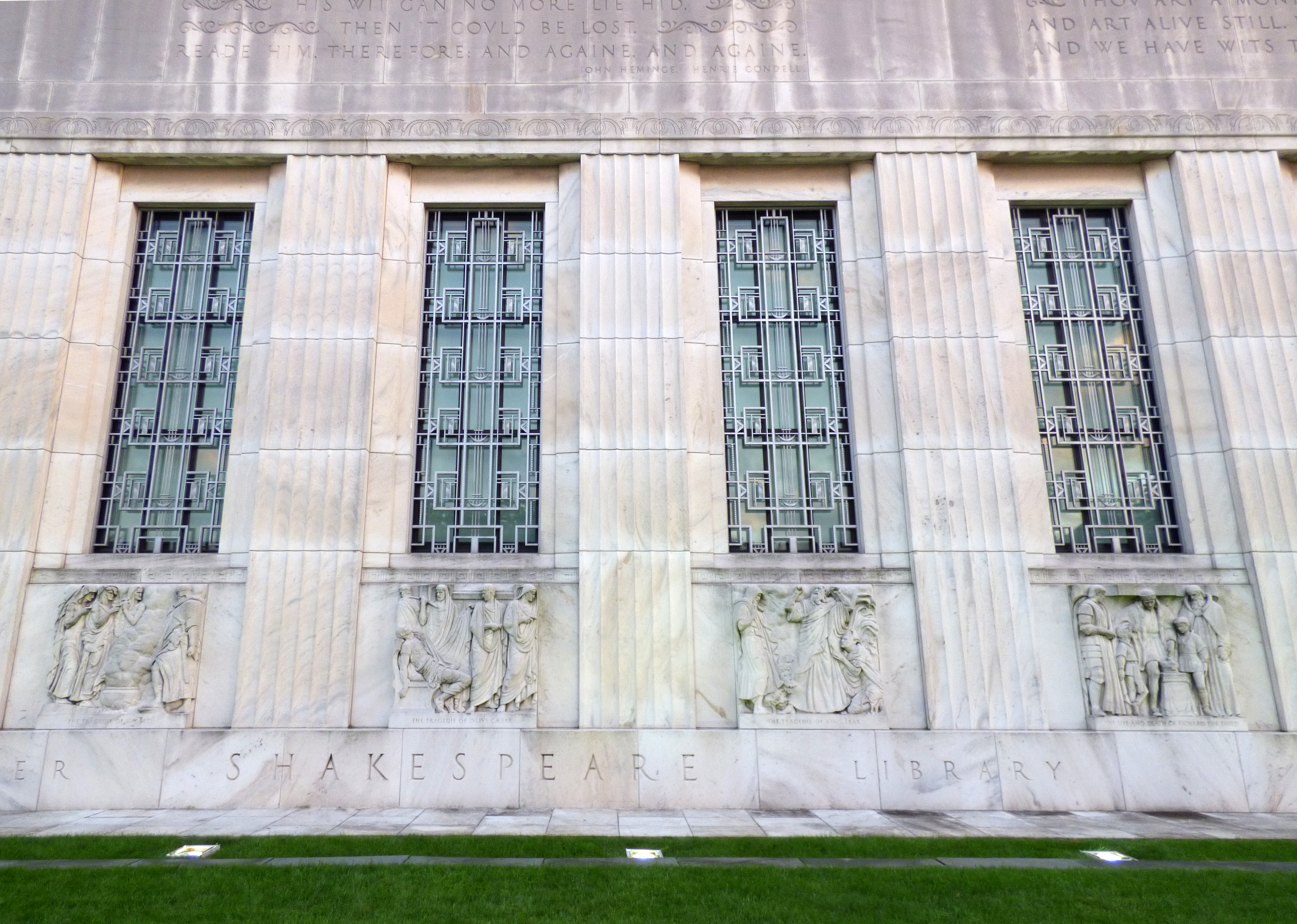
Folger Shakespeare Library in Washington, D.C.

In Europe, examples as early as the Embassy of Germany, Saint Petersburg, designed by Peter Behrens and completed in 1912, "established models for the classical purity aspired to by high modernists like Mies van der Rohe but also for the oversized, Stripped Classicism of Hitler's, Stalin's and Ulbricht's architects and perhaps of American, British and French official buildings in the 1930s as well". The style later found adherents in the Fascist regimes of Germany and Italy as well as in the Soviet Union during Stalin's regime. Albert Speer's Zeppelinfeld and other parts of the Nazi party rally grounds complex outside Nuremberg were perhaps the most famous examples in Germany, using classical elements such as columns and altars alongside modern technology such as spotlights. The Casa del Fascio in Como has also been aligned with the movement. In the USSR some of the proposals for the unbuilt Palace of the Soviets also had characteristics of the style.

Among American architects, the work of Paul Philippe Cret exemplifies the style. His Château-Thierry American Monument built in 1928 has been identified as an early example. Among his other works identified with the style are the exterior of the 1933 Folger Shakespeare Library in Washington, D.C. (though not the Tudor Revival library interior), the 1937 University of Texas at Austin's Main Tower, the 1937 Federal Reserve Building in Washington, D.C., and the 1939 Bethesda Naval Hospital tower.

It is sometimes evident in buildings that were constructed by the Works Projects Administration during the Great Depression, albeit with a mix of Art Deco architecture or its elements. Related styles have been described as PWA Moderne and Greco Deco.

The movement was widespread, and transcended national boundaries. Architects who at least notably experimented in Stripped Classicism included John James Burnet, Giorgio Grassi, Léon Krier, Aldo Rossi, Albert Speer, Robert A. M. Stern and Paul Troost. (Note: German architect and husband of architect Gerdy Troost)

Despite its popularity with totalitarian regimes, it has been adapted by many English-speaking democratic governments, including during the New Deal in the United States. In any event, presumed "fascist" underpinnings have hampered acceptance into mainstream architectural thought. There is no evidence that architects who favored this style had a particular right-wing political disposition. Nevertheless, both Adolf Hitler and Benito Mussolini were fans. On the other hand, Stripped Classicism was favored by Joseph Stalin and various regional Communist regimes.

After the defeat of Nazi Germany and end of World War II, the style fell out of favor. However, it was somewhat revived in designs in the 1960s. Included was Philip Johnson's New York Lincoln Center for the Performing Arts, evidencing "a revival in the Stripped Classical style". Likewise, Canberra, Australia, saw the Law Courts of the Australian Capital Territory (1961) and the National Library of Australia (1968) resurrect grand Stripped Classical designs. See Australian non-residential architectural styles.

== The paradoxical embrace of old and new ==
The use of culture and 'myth' was a shared peculiarity of totalitarian political programmes during the 1920–30s, including Nazism in Germany and Soviet Communism in Russia. Cultural incentives launched by these states, and all their various intricacies, evoked currents of modernist thought.

Through architecture, they strove to invoke the power of modernity in their physical landscapes (especially in their capital cities) and, simultaneously, reinvent the past (as symbolised by Stripped Classicism's restrained classical features) by ransacking its archetypal 'healthy' elements to inaugurate a reforged, rejuvenated, futural, open-ended and monumental future.

It is this curious dichotomy between old and new, an inexorable feature of Stripped Classicism, which historian Roger Griffin has encapsulated in his conceptual framework of 'rooted modernism' (which he discusses in relation to fascist buildings).

The modernism in Stripped Classical buildings can be seen through their stylistic components (mute apertures, blank walls and the absence of ornament) and through their pure functionality. Adolf Loos, an Austrian theorist of modern architecture, and his essay "Ornament and Crime" can be seen as just one of the many philosophers/theorists/architects who foreshadowed some of the stylistic elements of Stripped Classicism.

Avant-garde movements such as Futurism also foreshadowed a form of building which is as much extravagant as it is streamlined, as much multi-functional as it is fit for the multi-faceted modern future vis-a-vis high-speed travel, technologically advanced means of communication, hydraulic engineering etc... "all in time for the most mechanised war in history", as Samuel Patterson writes.

The Stripped Classical style was also embraced by Franklin D. Roosevelt, who yearned for an architecture symbolising a 'new beginning' under New Dealism (which was fighting to ameliorate the ramifications of the Great Depression), and concomitantly, archetypal American genius. A discussion of the Roosevelt administration, its reinvention of the past (centred on Jeffersonianism) and its uses of architecture in the 1930s can be found in Patterson's 'Problem-Solvers' thesis.

== Notable examples ==
Name	Image	Location	Architect(s)	Year completed	Notes
Embassy of Germany, Saint Petersburg		Saint Petersburg, Russia	Peter Behrens	1913	
Provisional Parliament House		Canberra, Australia	John Smith Murdoch	1927	
Valley Life Sciences Building at UC Berkeley		Berkeley, California, U.S.	George W. Kelham	1930	
Polish Ministry of Education		Warsaw, Poland	Zdzisław Mączeński	1930	
Parliament House		Helsinki, Finland	J. S. Sirén	1931	Also a key example of Nordic Classicism
William R. Cotter Federal Building		Hartford, Connecticut, U.S.	Malmfeldt, Adams & Prentice	1931	
Frist Center for the Visual Arts		Nashville, Tennessee, U.S.	Marr & Holman	1932	
Folger Shakespeare Library		Washington, D.C., U.S.	Paul Philippe Cret	1933	John Gregory, architectural sculpture; Brenda Putnam, statue of Puck
Ankara Opera House		Ulus, Ankara, Turkey	Şevki Balmumcu	1933	Originally built as an exhibition house, it was renovated and turned into an opera house by Paul Bonatz in 1946.
Martin Luther King Jr. Federal Building		Atlanta, Georgia, U.S.	A. Ten Eyck Brown	1933	
Eccles Building (Federal Reserve)		Washington, D.C., U.S.	Paul Philippe Cret	1937	Sidney Waugh, architectural sculpture; Samuel Yellin, wrought iron; Ezra Winter, murals
San Francisco Mint		San Francisco, California, U.S.	Gilbert Stanley Underwood	1937	
Tennessee Supreme Court Building		Nashville, Tennessee, U.S.	Marr & Holman	1937	
Victoria Palace		Bucharest, Romania	Duiliu Marcu	1937	
Virginia Department of Highways Building		Richmond, Virginia, U.S.	Carneal, Johnston & Wright	1937	
Meštrović Pavilion		Zagreb, Croatia	Ivan Meštrović	1938	
Oregon State Capitol		Salem, Oregon, U.S.	Francis Keally and Trowbridge & Livingston	1938	Leo Friedlander and Ulric Ellerhusen, architectural sculpture; Frank Henry Schwarz and Barry Faulkner, murals
Turkish Grand National Assembly (TBMM)		Bakanlıklar, Ankara, Turkey	Clemens Holzmeister	1938	The building was said to have been commissioned in 1938, but was not built and put into use until 1960
Ankara University Faculty of Law Building		Çankaya, Ankara, Turkey	Abdullah Ziya Kozanoğlu	1938	
Patrick Henry Building		Richmond, Virginia, U.S.	Carneal, Johnston and Wright	1938	
Palace of Nations		Geneva, Switzerland	Carlo Broggi, Julien Flegenheimer, Camille Lefèvre, Henri Paul Nénot, Joseph Vago	1938	
Main Post Office Palace		Belgrade, Serbia	Vasilij Mihajlovič Androsov	1938	
Banovina Palace		Novi Sad, Serbia	Dragiša Brašovan	1939	Reliefs were done by Karlo Baranji. The reliefs showcase Peter I of Serbia, Alexander I of Yugoslavia, Radomir Putnik, Petar Bojović, Živojin Mišić, and Stepa Stepanović.
PRIZAD Building		Belgrade, Serbia	Bogdan Nestorović	1939	
Houston City Hall		Houston, Texas, U.S.	Joseph Finger	1939	
Harry S Truman Building (particularly the War Department Building) of the United States Department of State		Washington, D.C., U.S.	Underwood & Foster	1939	
Justice Building		Raleigh, North Carolina, U.S.	Northrup & O'Brien	1940	
Waltham Forest Town Hall		London Borough of Waltham Forest, England	Philip Hepworth	1941	
TCDD General Headquarters Building		Ulus, Ankara, Turkey	Bedri Uçar	1941	Only the central structure of the building was completed in 1941; the rest of the building was not completed until 1986.
Dauphin County Courthouse		Harrisburg, Pennsylvania, U.S.	Lawrie and Green	1942	
Istanbul University Faculty of Science and Literature Building		Fatih, Istanbul, Turkey	Sedad Hakkı Eldem and Emin Halid Onat	1942	Key example of the Second National Architecture Movement, with traditional Turkish references in a Stripped Classical framework.
Esposizione Universale Roma (EUR) (Colosseo Quadrato pictured)		Rome, Italy	Marcello Piacentini	1942	Planned for the world's fair 1942, but unfinished due to the war.
Lisner Auditorium		Washington, D.C., U.S.	Faulkner & Kingsbury	1943	
Bernardo O'Higgins Military School		Santiago de Chile	Juan Martínez Gutiérrez	1943	
Istanbul Radio Hall		Şişli, Istanbul, Turkey	Doğan Erginbaş, Ömer Güney and İsmail Utkular	1945	
Faculty of Law, University of Buenos Aires		Buenos Aires, Argentina	Arturo Ochoa, Ismael G. Chiappori and Pedro Mario Vinent	1949	
Jamuna Bhaban		Chittagong, Bangladesh		1952	Headquarters of Jamuna Oil Company
Anıtkabir		Ankara, Turkey	Emin Halid Onat and Ahmet Orhan Arda	1953	Mausoleum of Mustafa Kemal Atatürk.
Faculty of Engineering, University of Buenos Aires		Buenos Aires, Argentina	Dirección General de Arquitectura of the Secretariat of Public Works	1956	
Lorenzo de Zavala State Archives and Library Building		Austin, Texas, U.S.	Adams and Adams	1959	
National Library of Australia		Canberra, Australia	Walter Bunning, in association with T.E. O’Mahoney	1968	"... modern derivation in the spirit of ancient Greco-Roman architecture. It is unequivocally a twentieth century building, in the architectural style that is called Late Twentieth Century Stripped Classical".
Ho Chi Minh Mausoleum		Hanoi, Vietnam	Garol Isakovich	1975	Mausoleum of Vietnamese revolutionary leader and President Ho Chi Minh, based in part on Lenin's Mausoleum.

== See also ==
- Boris Iofan
- Constructivist architecture
- Dulwich Picture Gallery and Mausoleum
- Giuseppe Terragni
- Monumentalism
- Nazi architecture
- Nordic Classicism
- Stalinist architecture
- Stile Littorio

== Sources ==
- Bryant, Brittany Paige (June 2011). Reassessing Stripped Classicism within the Narrative of International Modernism in the 1920s–1930s (PDF) (MFA). The Savannah College of Art and Design.
