= James A. Cayce Homes =

Housing project in Nashville, Tennessee, U.S.

Coordinates: 36.1671°N 86.7562°W

The James A. Cayce Homes is a housing project in East Nashville, Tennessee, U.S.. It was built in 1939-1941 as a white-only community. By the 2000s, it was the lowest-income locality in Nashville. It is the largest housing project in Nashville.

== History ==
The 386-unit project was built from 1939 to 1941. About 40 structures were torn down to make way for the new buildings. They were designed by Marr & Holman. It was supposed to be called Boscobel Heights. However, as James A. Cayce, the chairman of the Nashville Housing Authority Board, died during the construction, it was named in his honor.

In accordance with segregation, it was built for white residents only. By the 2000s, it was the lowest-income locality in Nashville, with a high rate of criminal activity.

As of 2017, it is the largest housing project in Nashville, with 781 units.

The parking lot was the location of the shooting of Jocques Clemmons on February 10, 2017.

== See also ==
- James A. Cayce Administration Service Building
