= Lauderdale County Courthouse =

Lauderdale County Courthouse may refer to:

- Lauderdale County Courthouse (Mississippi), Meridian, Mississippi, a Mississippi Landmark
- Lauderdale County Courthouse (Tennessee), Ripley, Tennessee
