= WNVL =

Radio station in Nashville, Tennessee

Simulcast with WMDB Nashville
- Nashville, Tennessee; United States
- Frequency: 1240 kHz
- Branding: Activa 880 y 105.1

Programming
- Format: Regional Mexican

Ownership
- Owner: Mark Janbakhsh; (TBLC Media, LLC)
- Sister stations: WMDB

History
- First air date: January 5, 1947; 79 years ago
- Former call signs: WKDA (1947–1998); WNSG (1998–2005)
- Call sign meaning: "Nashville"

Technical information
- Licensing authority: FCC
- Facility ID: 16898
- Class: C
- Power: 1,000 watts unlimited
- Transmitter coordinates: 36°9′23″N 86°46′16″W
- Translator: see below

Links
- Public license information: Public file; LMS
- Webcast: Listen Live
- Website: activanetwork.com/nashville1240/

WNVL (1240 AM) is a radio station broadcasting a Regional Mexican music format. Licensed to Nashville, Tennessee, United States, the station is currently owned by Mark Janbakhsh, through licensee TBLC Media, LLC.

The station signed on in 1947 as WKDA, Nashville's fourth radio station, with stints as Nashville's leading Top 40 station and playing country music. It dropped the call sign in 1998 and has since programmed gospel music and Spanish-language programming.

== History ==
=== Early years ===
The Capitol Broadcasting Company, a partnership of A. G. Beaman and T. B. Baker, Jr., applied on July 31, 1944, for a construction permit to build a new radio station in Nashville, to broadcast full-time with 250 watts on 1450 kHz. Beaman owned a bottling firm, while Baker was the advertising manager of Nashville radio station WLAC. After a comparative hearing, Capitol received a permit for a similar facility on 1240 kHz on October 9, 1946; 1450 kHz was instead awarded to an applicant for a station in Murfreesboro.

The station took the call letters WKDA and signed on January 5, 1947, from studios on the top floor of the American National Bank Building and a transmitter at Second Avenue and Peabody Street. Capitol also applied for a television station but withdrew its application for channel 5 in 1952, clearing the way for WLAC-TV to launch.

Larry Munson moved from Cheyenne, Wyoming, to be the new outlet's sports director; he took the job on the advice of Curt Gowdy and called Nashville Vols minor league baseball and Vanderbilt Commodores football and basketball for the station. While he almost got fired for uttering "fuck" on the air, Munson managed to keep his job.

=== Top 40 era ===
In 1954, Baker and Beaman sold WKDA in order to become part-owners of WLAC radio and television; they were required to do so under the settlement agreement by which WKDA had dropped its channel 5 application. The buyer, paying $312,500 for the radio station, was John Kluge and Associates. Under Kluge, beginning in 1956, the station became one of Nashville's leading popular music outlets, entering into competition with WMAK (1300 AM) for listeners. Early evidence of the rivalry surfaced on an afternoon in June 1958 when WKDA sent a costumed "purple people eater", inspired by the hit song The Purple People Eater, to climb the sign of the Noel Hotel and throw money down on the intersection of Church Street and Fourth Avenue. WMAK then sent a plane to buzz area buildings bearing a banner. The result was a commotion of 1,500 people jamming the intersection and a warning by the Nashville police chief for the stations "never to pull a trick" like it again.

1958 also brought a new program director: Jack Stapp, previously of WSM and owner of record company Tree Publishing. The next year, Kluge, who had bought Metropolitan Broadcasting but ran it separately from WKDA and KNOK in Fort Worth, Texas, sold those two stations to a consortium of Townsend Investment Company and singer Pat Boone for $1.08 million, with $650,000 of that represented by the Nashville station. That same year, the station was among the first to call its disc jockeys "Good Guys", a moniker later used in other cities at top 40 stations. When the First American Bank Building (having replaced American National Bank) was expanded in 1961 with the addition of an eighth floor, WKDA moved up from the seventh floor to occupy it. It was also approved to increase power to 1,000 watts during the day that same year. In a city defined by country music, it was WKDA, its "Good Guys" and its top 40 format that led the ratings every year beginning in 1955, despite being the city's only 1,000-watt outlet. It set market ratings share records that continued to stand for decades.

In the mid-1960s, major changes took place at WKDA. The station acquired a majority share in WNFO-FM 103.3 in late 1964, WKDA then purchased the remainder, took the station silent and returned it to the air in December 1966 as WKDA-FM. At the same time, WKDA moved into new quarters on the top floor of the Stahlman Building; the Chatham Corporation, successor to Townsend, experienced full board turnover as a result of an investigation by the Securities and Exchange Commission; and Stapp resigned to look after his record publishing interests. After moving into the building late in 1966, Chatham bought the Stahlman Building itself for $1.6 million.

=== Going country ===
WKDA had become a fixture in Nashville radio with its format, even as its ratings began to slip behind WMAK as the 1960s ended. That set the stage for a surprise. On February 22, 1970, WKDA announced it would change formats to country on March 15. Promoting itself as "The Now Sound of Nashville" with a more modern format, WKDA now entered a market "virtually glutted" with country stations, including WSM and WENO, but WSM played country only at night and WENO was not a 24-hour operation.

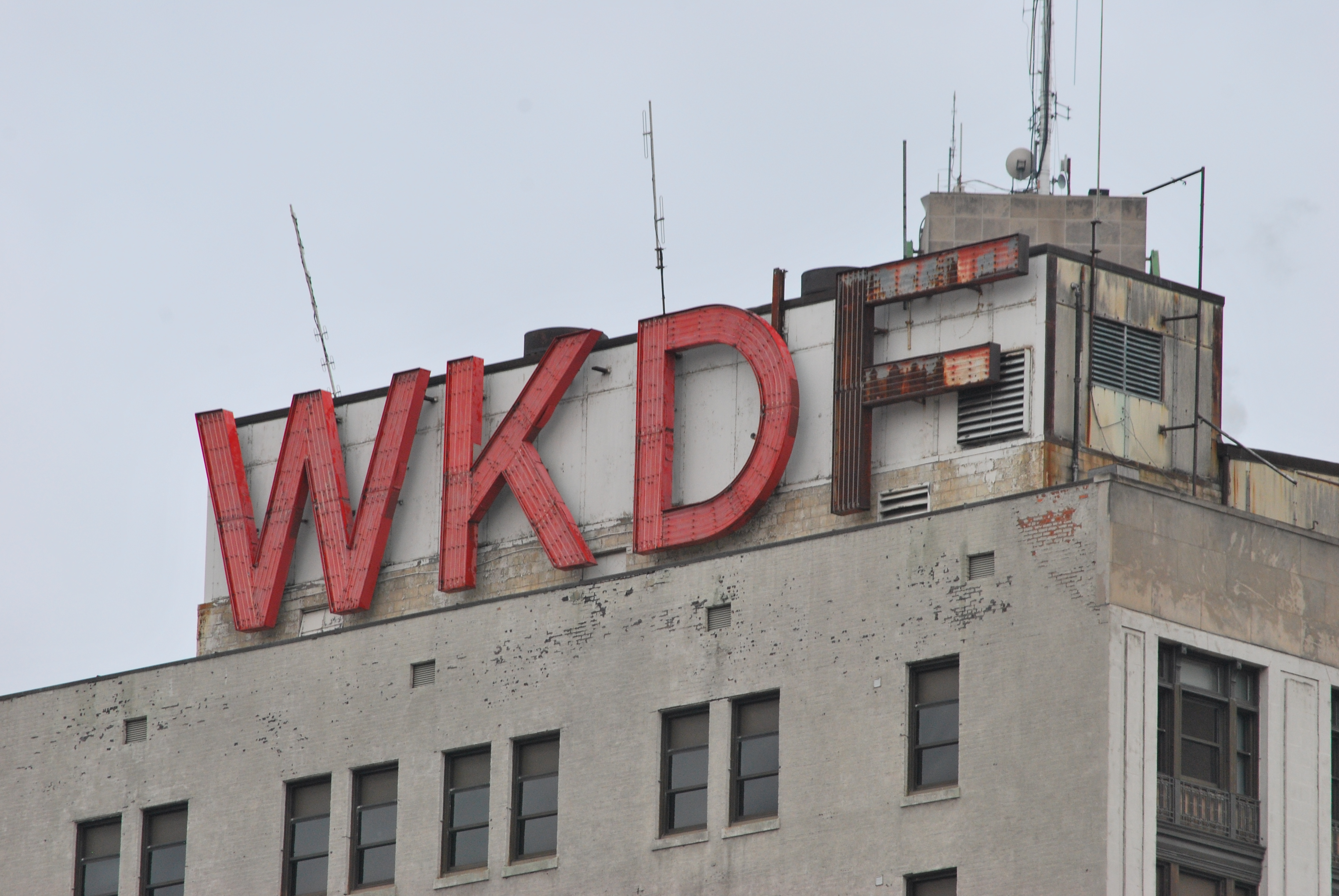
Originally a sign for WKDA AM and FM, a new WKDF sign was installed on the Stahlman Building in 1976 when the FM's call letters were changed

WKDA-AM-FM were sold in 1976 to Dick Broadcasting Company for $1.2 million. WKDA-FM, then airing a rock format, became WKDF later that year to give it a separate identity from the AM station. Dick built a new studio complex at the transmitter site in 1978 for WKDA and WKDF. However, as with other AM stations, WKDA's ratings showed a pronounced slump in the late 1970s and early 1980s. The station also served as the broadcaster for Nashville Sounds minor-league baseball in 1979 and as an affiliate of the short-lived Enterprise Radio Network in 1981.

=== Format changes in the 1980s and 1990s ===
In mid-1982, WKDA dropped its country format after 12 years and spent the rest of the year simulcasting WKDF's album-oriented rock programming. On New Year's Day 1983, the station launched an early modern rock format, providing commercial competition to WRVU, the student station at Vanderbilt University. It was the first station in the format in the southeastern United States and among the first in the country, but it would not last; the next year, WKDA changed formats to oldies.

In November 1990, WKDA flipped from oldies to the audio of CNN Headline News, citing continued low ratings as an oldies station.

In April 1995, veteran Nashville broadcaster Teddy Bart and Karlen Evins, who had previously hosted a program known as The Roundtable on WWTN, began brokering three hours of airtime on the station and planned to purchase WKDA outright. The two then entered into a deal to buy the station for $325,000 in July.

=== Gospel and Spanish ===
Bart-Evins Broadcasting sold WKDA to Mortenson Broadcasting for $600,000 in 1998. The sale spurred the first call sign change in more than 50 years of broadcasting, as WKDA became WNSG and adopted an Urban Gospel format.

WNSG remained on 1240 kHz through 2005, when the station was purchased for $2.7 million by the Davidson Media Group of New York City, a group formed to buy stations in mid-sized markets and focusing on Hispanic audiences. Davidson also purchased WMDB (880 AM) at the same time, moved the gospel programming there, and relaunched WNSG as Spanish-language WNVL on October 3. The station was initially known as Selecta 1240.

TBLC Media, owned by Mark Janbakhsh, entered into a time brokerage agreement to take over the operations of WNVL on October 1, 2011. In April 2012, it then filed to buy the station outright, conditional on obtaining a new lease for a tower site. In 2015, TBLC then purchased another 12 stations owned by Davidson in Virginia, North Carolina, South Carolina, and the Kansas City market. Janbakhsh, an Iranian whose wife is Mexican American, also owns car dealerships and converted a former Kroger grocery store into Plaza Mariachi–Music City, a mini-mall featuring tenants oriented to the Hispanic community, where the stations were relocated.

Previous logo

== FM translator ==
In addition to the main station, WNVL programming is relayed to an FM translator:

Call sign	Frequency	City of license	FID	ERP (W)	Class	FCC info
W286CY	105.1 FM	Nashville, Tennessee	141723	250	D	LMS
