= List of killings by law enforcement officers in the United States, February 2017 =

This is a list of people reported killed by non-military law enforcement officers in the United States in February 2017, whether in the line of duty or not, and regardless of reason or method. The listing documents the occurrence of a death, making no implications regarding wrongdoing or justification on the part of the person killed or officer involved. Killings are arranged by date of the incident that caused death. Different death dates, if known, are noted in the description. The table below lists 111 people.

== February 2017 ==
Date	Name (age) of deceased	State (city)	Description
2017-02-28	Christopher Redding (20)	Florida (Orlando)	
2017-02-28	Jose Olivares (43)	Louisiana (Houma)	
2017-02-28	Earl Riley (25)	Texas (Houston)	
2017-02-27	Joey Bridges (27)	North Carolina (Shelby)	
2017-02-27	Shawn Igers (40)	Wisconsin (Merrill)	
2017-02-26	Erin Olsen Yadegar (46)	California (Ripon)	
2017-02-26	Jacob Taulbee (41)	Florida (Englewood)	
2017-02-26	Barry Zumwalt (36)	Utah (Tooele)	
2017-02-26	James Leroy Marker (66)	FLorida (Floral City)	
2017-02-25	WIlliam Dwayne Darby (39)	Georgia (Lumpkin)	
2017-02-25	Lorenzo Antoine Cruz (23)	California (Rocklin)	
2017-02-24	Childress, Gregory (44)	Arkansas (Little Rock	
2017-02-24	Isgrigg, Joey (30)	Kentucky (London)	
2017-02-24	Johnson, Jacqueline (33)	Texas (Lake Jackson)	
2017-02-24	Stoudt, Michael (62)	Pennsylvania (Reading)	
2017-02-24	Douglas Roger Tanner (53)	Georgia (Butts County)	Deputies with the Butts County Sheriff's Office were executing a narcotics related search warrant at a home on Keys Ferry Road around 5 a.m. when they encountered Douglas Roger Tanner, Authorities said a physical altercation occurred and Tanner was Tased by a deputy. Tanner then began showing signs of physical distress and was taken to Sylvan Grove Hospital, where he was later pronounced dead.
2017-02-23	Montano, David (33)	Kansas (Newton)	
2017-02-23	Robertson, Kenneth (54)	Oklahoma (Fairfax)	
2017-02-23	Valenzuela, Steven (24)	Nevada (Reno)	
2017-02-23	Williams, Timothy (47)	Washington DC	
2017-02-23	Patton, Jimmie (38)	Ohio (Columbus)	
2017-02-22	Rankins, Morgan (30)	Texas (Austin)	
2917-02-22	Blake, Medger (41)	Texas (Conroe)	
2017-02-22	Johnson, Kevin (28)	Florida (Lake Alfred)	
2017-02-22	Kyle Copson (26)	West Virginia (Princeton)	On February 22, at about 3:40, two troopers with the West Virginia State Police responded to a report of a man brandishing a large knife on Meadowfield Lane in Princeton. When the troopers arrived at the scene, they encountered Kyle Copson. The troopers gave Copson numerous verbal commands to drop the knife, but he refused to obey. Both troopers responded to what they seem an immediate threat and fired their weapons, striking Copson, who died at the scene from his injuries.
2017-02-21	Cano, Misael (39)	Colorado (Colorado Springs)	
2017-02-21	Sambrano, Bartolo (25)	Utah (Ogden)	
2017-02-21	Smith, Douglas (51)	Oregon (Beaverton)	
2017-02-21	Don Clark Sr. (63)	Missouri (St. Louis)	Clark was shot and killed during a no-knock warrant. A lawsuit claims that police broke down Clark's door and launched a flash-bang grenade, before an officer shot Clark nine times. The lawsuit also says Clark was unarmed at the time.
2017-02-21	Nicolas Sanchez (38)	Utah (Roy)	Two officers responded to a call of an individual acting suspiciously at a gas station. The officers approached Sanchez outside the gas station, who was uncooperative. At one point Sanchez put his hand in his pocket, and when officers told him to keep his hands in the open, Sanchez briefly lifted his shirt revealing a handgun. As the officer got closer Sanchez attempted to flee the scene, and a struggle ensued. Sanchez's firearm was briefly dropped, and one of the officers, thinking Sanchez had more weapons, shot Sanchez three times with his own gun. Sanchez died at the scene, and an department investigation later ruled that the officers were justified in using deadly force.
2017-02-20	Hodge, Taylor (26)	Florida (Brooksville)	
2017-02-20	Jason Fanning (27)	Missouri (St. Joseph)	According to Captain Jeff Wilson of Missouri State Highway Patrol, On Monday an officer responded to a report of a suspicious vehicle at 20th and Charles Street in St. Joseph. In the process of investigating, the officer fired shots. Fanning, allegedly the driver of the vehicle, was hit during the incident and transported to the hospital, where he later died. Sgt. The St. Joseph Police Department has requested the patrol investigate the incident. the officer who fired the shots has been placed on administrative leave.
2017-02-19	Reyes, Sergio (18)	New York (Brooklyn)	
2017-02-19	Carter, Christopher (27)	Ohio (Kent)	
2017-02-19	Encinas, Manuel (26)	Arizona (Tucson)	
2017-02-19	Kyle Riggs (33)	Arkansas (Bull Shoals)	A Marion County Sheriff’s deputy and a Bull Shoals Police Officer responded to a breaking and entering and assault call at a residence early Sunday. Riggs shot at the officers when they arrived and the officers shot back, hitting Riggs in the head, according to authorities. Arkansas State Police spokesman Liz Chapman said police believe that Riggs did not live in the residence and was a suspect in the breaking and entering.
2017-02-18	Baker, Chance (22)	Maine (Portland)	
2017-02-18	Crockett, Keo (46)	North Carolina (Efland)	
2017-02-18	Kosi, Charles (48)	Hawaii (Honolulu)	
2017-02-17	Enjaian, Jesse (32)	California (Oakland)	
2017-02-17	English, David (34)	Oklahoma (Tulsa)	
2017-02-17	Henry, Joshua (30)	Texas (Grand Prairie)	
2017-02-17	Warner, Christopher (33)	California (Cerritos)	
2017-02-17	Valescot, Jean (35)	Alaska (Big Lake)	
2017-02-16	Briggs, Jimmy (21)	California (Gardena)	
2017-02-16	Tamayo, Joseph (48)	Texas (San Antonio)	
2017-02-16	Torres, Kadeem (17)	New York (Brooklyn)	
2017-02-16	Simmons, Jonathon (22)	California (Douglas City)	
2017-02-15	McLendon, Andrew (33)	Missouri (Cape Girandeau)	
2017-02-15	Bailey, Kenneth (24)	North Carolina (Durham)	
2017-02-15	Garnica, Mauro (55)	California (Newman)	
2017-02-15	Chad Robertson (25)	Illinois (Prospect)	Robertson was taking a bus from Memphis, Tennessee, to Minneapolis and was on a stopover in Chicago when the shooting occurred. According to family members, the transit officer fired at Robertson as he ran during an encounter near Union Station. The officer reportedly fired twice, striking Robertson once in the left shoulder. Chicago Police spokesman Anthony Guglielmi says the man's wounds were considered non-life-threatening at the time. He says the wounded man was found with cash and narcotics, but was unarmed.
2017-02-14	Quantrell Hutchinson (64)	Wichita Falls, Texas	Hutchinson was arrested on February 12 and involved in an altercation with jail personnel two days later. Officers repeatedly tased him, shot him with pepper balls, and restrained him on his stomach. Hutchinson was discovered unresponsive, transported to the hospital, and died on February 24. His death was ruled a homicide.
2017-02-14	Morris, Michael (53)	Ohio (Columbus)	
2017-02-14	Oliger, Steven (64)	Indiana (Shelbyville)	
2017-02-14	Zimmerman, David (35)	Indiana (Vincennes)	
2017-2-14	Brandon Lambert (32)	Tennessee (Knoxville)	Brandon Lambert was wanted on multiple warrants for property crimes. Sheriffs Deputies shot and killed Lambert in a Turkey Creek parking lot after his vehicle alleged moved towards them. He was unarmed. There is no video of the shooting. KPD investigated the incident and cleared all deputies.
2017-02-14	Raynard Burton (19)	Michigan (Detroit)	The incident started as police saw the green Pontiac Grand Prix speeding at about 1:30 p.m., northbound on Broadstreet at Collingwood. Just as police activated their emergency lights, the Pontiac crashed into a pole, the driver Raynard Burton exited and ran. An officer followed him about a quarter-mile to an area behind an abandoned home. As the officer was giving the suspect direction to get down to handcuff the suspect, the suspect lunged in the direction of the officer, During a brief struggle, one shot was fired, striking the Burton in his Chest. He died at the scene. The officer was not hurt.
2017-02-13	Krause, Drey (53)	Arizona (Topock)	
2017-02-13	Bryan Carreno (26)	California (Santa Barbara)	26-year-old Bryan Carreno was killed by deputies when officials say he charged at them with a knife. Five deputies involved were place on administrative leave after the incident. According to the Santa Barbara County Sheriff's Office, deputies were called to a home in North La Cumbre Road at 6:30 p.m. Sunday by a family member "who reported that Carreno was inside the garage and was hallucinating."
2017-02-13	William Young (32)	Kentucky (Louisville)	Officers of the Louisville Metropolitan Police Department were responding to a "break-in, in progress" report that originated from a 911 call about a man inside an occupied home who ran to an abandoned residence next door. The officers announced their presence multiple times as they were entering the house. Young, who was crouched in an "ambush-like position", charged at the officers holding a metal skewer. He then struck one of officers, Russel Braun, on his upper chest, nearly missing the throat. This caused Braun to accidentally shoot himself in the hand. He and two other officers, Randall Richardson and Paige Young, fired a total of 10 shots in a four-second timespan.
2017-02-12	Willard Eugene Scott (31)	North Carolina (Durham)	Around 1 a.m. Trooper Jerimy Mathis, attempted to stop a 1996 Nissan sedan that was driving erratically on US-501 near Duke Street. Officials said the driver, Willard Scott Jr. failed to stop when Mathis turned on sirens. After a brief pursuit, Scott exited his vehicle and began to run on foot. During the chase, Mathis fired his gun and struck Scott. Scott was transported to Duke Regional Hospital where he later died. spokesperson of Highway Patrol said that Scott displayed a gun, but details have not been released on whether or not he pointed it at Mathis.
2017-02-12	Schneider, Robert	Texas (Terrell)	
2017-02-11	Sanchez, Pekelo (33)	Hawaii (Aiea)	
2017-02-11	Mendez, Jason (37)	South Carolina (Greenville)	
2017-02-11	Ashley, Alonzo (27)	Missouri (Kansas City)	
2017-02-11	James Stephen McMullen (45)	Oklahoma (Bethany)	Police responded to a home on NW 36th Terrace shortly after noon Friday, after the woman who lived at the home showed up to the police station, saying her son had beat her up. According to the police chief, that's when two police officers arrived to talk to her son James McMullen, he opened the door and was holding a gun – pointed towards his chest. When officers ordered him to drop the gun, One of the officers fired multiple times, fatally hitting the suspect.
2017-02-10	Robey, Michelle (55)	Illinois (Chicago)	
2017-02-10	Clemmons, Jocques (31)	Tennessee (Nashville)	
2017-02-10	Blackman, Carlos (25)	North Carolina (Greensboro)	
2017-02-10	Fagre, Amber (18)	Maine (Vassalboro)	
2017-02-10	Bailey, Kadhar (25)	Maine (Vassalboro)	
2017-02-10	Burton, Justin (25)	Washington (Vancouver)	
2017-02-10	Darryl L. Fuqua (24)	New Jersey (Bridgeton)	Four Bridgeton Police Department officers pursuing Fuqua in an alley around South and Fremont avenues around 4 p.m., after witnessing an alleged drug transaction. Fuqua was armed with a loaded .38-caliber revolver. One of the officers fired his weapon, striking Fuqua twice. Fuqua died as he was being transported to the hospital. Officers said that Fuqua was fired upon after he disregarded two orders to stop and to drop his gun, and after Fuqua turned and pointed the gun at the officer. The Cumberland County Prosecutor's Office conducted an investigation and determined that the use of force was lawful and justified. An independent review by the New Jersey Attorney General's Office agreed with the determination.
2017-02-10	Chance David Baker (22)	Maine (Portland)	Police responded to reports of a man at Union Station Plaza acting erratically and armed with a rifle, which was later revealed to be an air-powered pellet gun. Police ordered Baker to drop the weapon, and he refused. Baker was shot at the scene and transported to Maine Medical Center, where he died.
2017-02-09	Palma, Vincent (26)	Ohio (Geneva)	
2017-02-09	Unnamed man	New Mexico (Bloomfield)	
2017-02-09	Salinas, Jeremy (33)	Washington (Lake Stevens)	Salinas reportedly called 911 saying that he wanted to kill police. Others in the area reported he was walking around with blood on his shirt while carrying a flag. When officers responded, he apparently advanced on them with a knife and told police to kill him. Officers first used a taser on him, but when it proved ineffective, shot him.
2017-02-09	Quanice Hayes (17)	Oregon (Portland)	Portland Police Bureau officers shot Quanice Derrick Hayes on the morning of February 9, after they responded to a report of an armed robbery at the Portland Value Inn Hotel. Officer Andrew Hearst shot Hayes inside a house blocks from the reported robbery and a related report of a car prowl near the Banfield Pet Hospital. Hayes' family set up a GoFundMe campaign to raise money for his funeral. Police say Hayes was armed with a "replica firearm". Officer Hearst is on paid administrative leave until a grand jury investigation is completed. Hayes was on his knees and cornered in a flower bed of a neighborhood home nearby the alleged robbery incident. Hearst testified that he did not see a firearm, but "was sure Hayes had" one. Hayes was shot in the forehead, left rib cage and his torso, while on his knees, by an AR-15 rifle. The death of Hayes has resulted in multiple protests within Portland, including a candlelight vigil across the street from where he was killed, multiple protests in the following month at the Justice Center, Portland City Hall, and throughout downtown Portland, and posters hung up sporadically around Portland depicting an illustration of Hayes with the words "Say His Name\Quanice Hayes." The protest on March 29 was met by riot police, and resulted in the arrest of six people.
2017-02-08	Hunter, Henry (34)	Oklahoma (Anadarko)	
2017-02-08	Robertson, Chad (25)	Illinois (Chicago)	
2017-02-08	Barrera, Michael (30)	California (Woodland)	
2017-02-08	Parker, Donald (29)	Indiana (Brookville)	
2017-02-07	Joseph, Kendole (27)	Louisiana (Gretna)	
2017-02-07	Nelson, Bradley (35)	Tennessee (Mount Pleasant)	
2017-02-07	Latimer, Richard (34)	Ohio (Warren)	
2017-02-07	Huntzinger, Kenny (51)	Kentucky (Richmond)	
2017-02-07	Davis, Alex (18)	Alabama (Pisgah)	
2017-02-07	Curtis Deal (18)	Maryland (Baltimore)	Officers of the Baltimore Police Department's Operations Intelligence Division were in an unmarked vehicle when they saw a car driving in an erratic motion. They pursued the car, calling an air unit in the process. Shortly after, Deal jumped out of the driver's seat and ran. During a foot pursuit, Deal ran past police officer, David Kincaid, and pointed a gun at him. Kincaid then fired at Deal four times. Deal was taken to hospital, where he died from his wounds. Deal was known to Baltimore Police detectives as a drug dealer and he was arrested twice for handgun violations.
2017-02-06	Allen, Jerome (22)	Florida (Jacksonville)	
2017-02-06	Vasquez, Gerardo (52)	California (Santa Monica)	
2017-02-06	Wooley, Cole (50)	Colorado (Commerce City)	
2017-02-06	Nana Adomako (45)	California (Fremont)	James Taylor, an officer of the Fremont Police Department, was responding to a 911 call about a man who was causing a disturbance at a business. When Taylor encountered Adomako, he attempted to apply a control hold onto him. Adomako pulled himself off. During the struggle, Taylor released a K9 dog in order to subdue Adomako, but the dog accidentally bit him in the leg. Adomako then allegedly punched Taylor on the left side of the head, which caused him to fire three shots at him. Taylor did not use his taser because he believed that it would be ineffective against Adomako's bulky jacket.
2017-02-05	Porter, Shelly (41)	Ohio (Englewood)	
2017-02-05	Bryd, Andrew (33)	Colorado (Pueblo)	
2017-02-04	Harris, Johnnie (68)	Missouri (Kansas City)	
2017-02-04	Torres, Peter (23)	Georgia (Moultrie)	
2017-02-04	Henry, Thomas (56)	Florida (DeLand)	
2017-02-03	McMasters, Daniel (38)	West Virginia (Grafton)	
2017-02-03	Thomas, Jamake (22)	North Carolina (Lumberton)	
2017-02-03	Gomez, Marco (26)	Illinois (Forest Park)	
2017-02-03	Lera, Jose (27)	California (Olympic Valley)	
2017-02-03	Whetstone, William (33)	North Carolina (Hickory)	
2017-02-03	Rucker, Daniel (45)	Texas (Irving)	
2017-02-03	Lee, Yia (41)	Texas (Panhandle)	
2017-02-02	Sword, Michael (57)	Florida (Orange Park)	
2017-02-02	Kristl, Kris (26)	Wisconsin (Geneva)	
2017-02-01	Silva, Miguel (18)	Texas (Wichita Falls)	
2017-02-01	Crane, Tavis (23)	Texas (Arlington)	
2017-02-01	Warren, Marquez (19)	California (Alameda)	
2017-02-01	Russo, Michael (31)	California (Highland)	

== See also ==
- Death in custody § United States
- Henry A. Wallace Police Crime Public Database
- List of cases of police brutality
- List of countries with annual rates and counts for killings by law enforcement officers
- List of law enforcement officers killed in the line of duty in the United States
- List of law enforcement officers convicted for an on-duty killing in the United States
- List of shootings by US immigration agents
- List of police reforms related to the George Floyd protests
- List of unarmed African Americans killed by law enforcement officers in the United States
- Lists of killings by law enforcement officers
- Police brutality in the United States
- Police misconduct § United States
- Police riot § United States
- Police use of deadly force in the United States
