= Virginia Department of Highways Building =

- U.S. National Register of Historic Places
- Virginia Landmarks Register
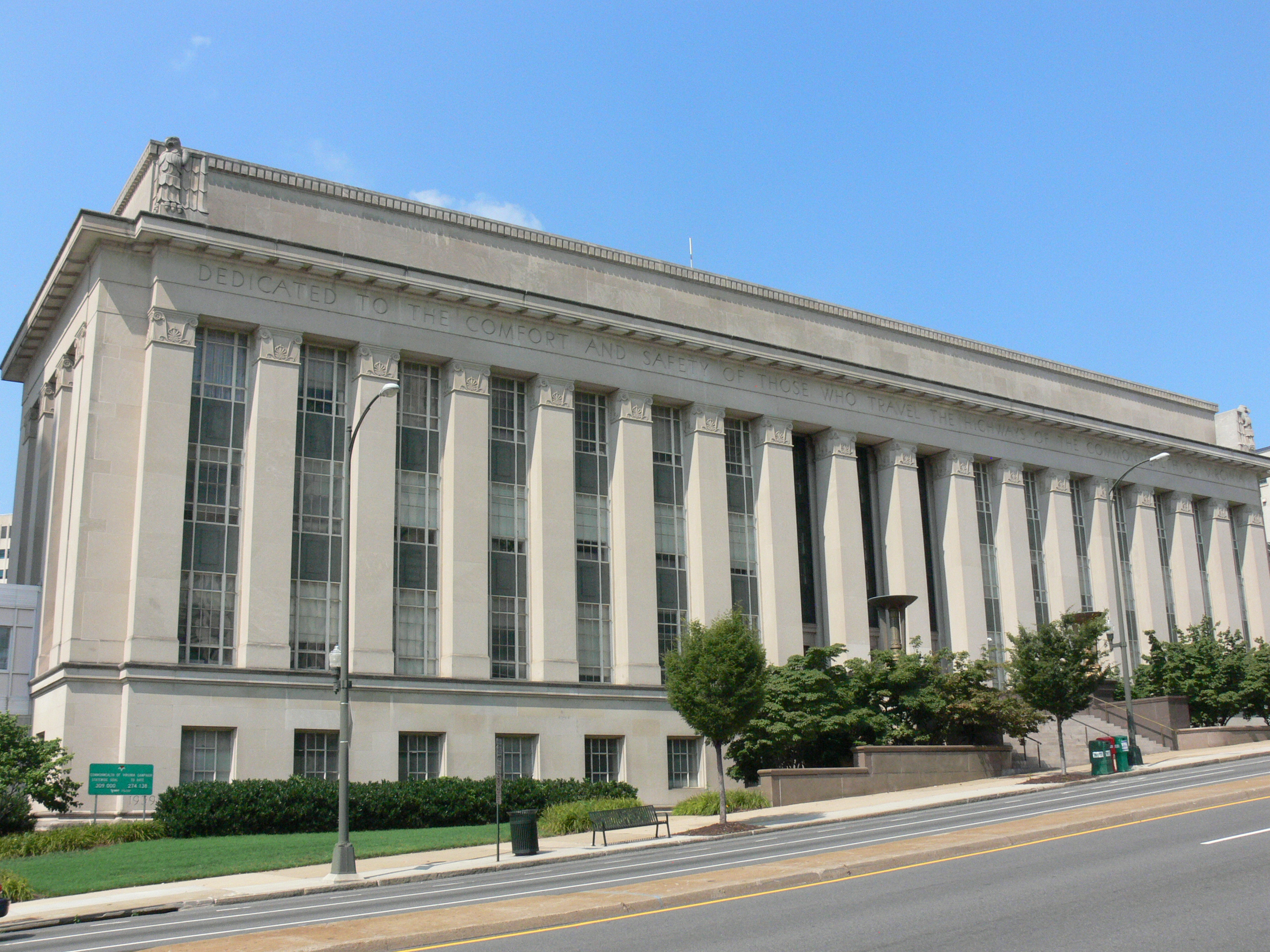
- Virginia Department of Highways Building, July 2011

- Location within Virginia Location within the United States
- Location: 1401 E. Broad St., Richmond, Virginia
- Coordinates: 37°32′17″N 77°25′51″W
- Area: 1.4 acres (0.57 ha)
- Built: 1937
- Built by: Virginia Engineering Co.
- Architect: Carneal, Johnston & Wright
- Architectural style: Stripped Classicism
- NRHP reference No.: 04000270
- VLR No.: 127-0844

Significant dates
- Added to NRHP: April 5, 2004
- Designated VLR: June 18, 2003

Virginia Department of Highways Building, also known as the State Highway Commission Building, is a historic government office building located in Richmond, Virginia. The building serves as headquarters for the Virginia Department of Transportation. It was built in 1937, and is a four-story, Stripped Classicism style building. It is of steel and reinforced concrete construction, with a veneer of limestone, Virginia greenstone, and pink granite.

It was listed on the National Register of Historic Places in 2004.
