= Fifth Avenue Historic District (Nashville, Tennessee) =

Historic district in Nashville, Tennessee

- U.S. National Register of Historic Places
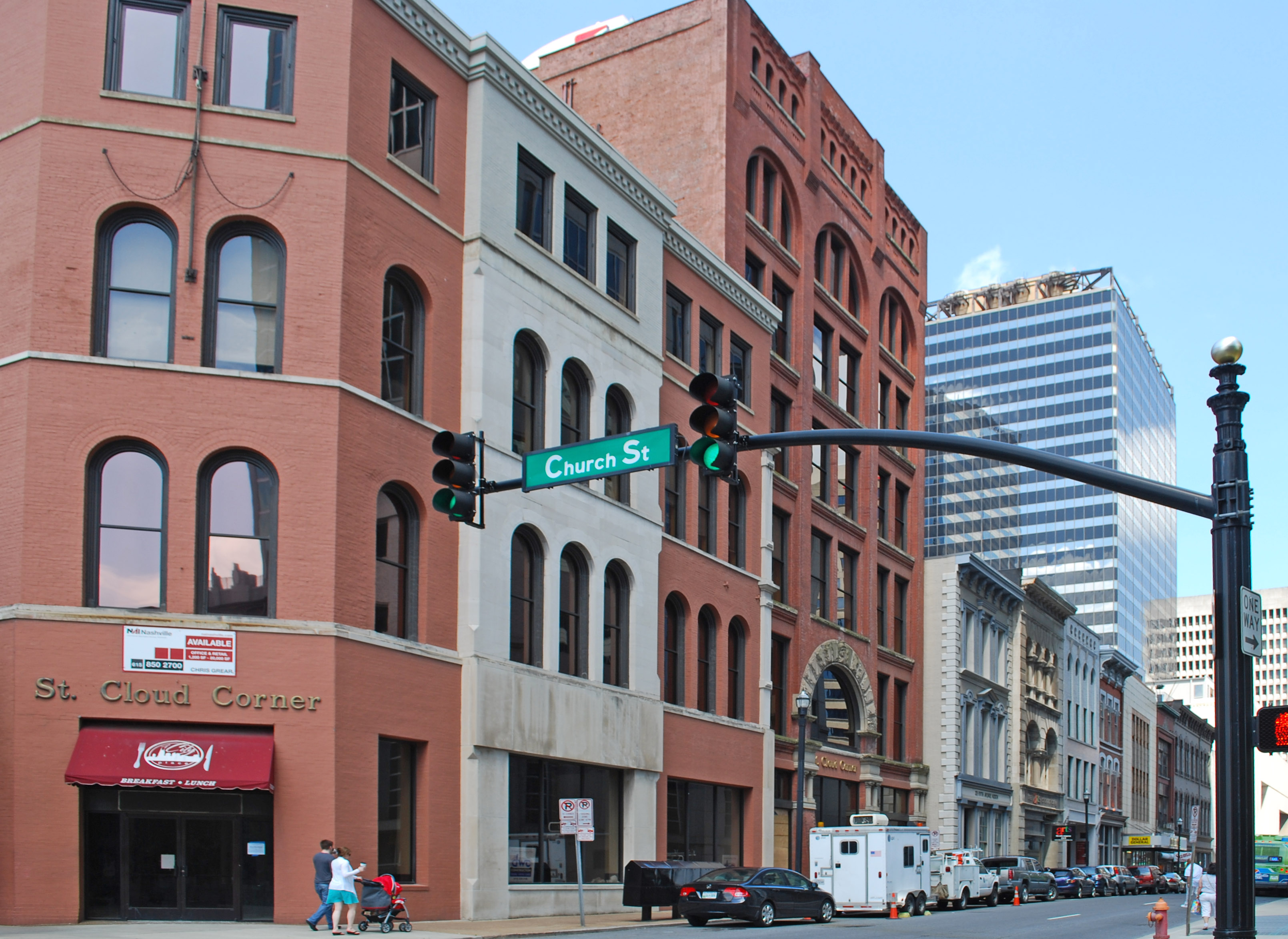
- Fifth Avenue Historic District Boulevard

- Location within Tennessee Location within the United States
- Location: Nashville, Tennessee
- Coordinates: 36.163889°N 86.780556°W
- Built: 1870–1930
- Architect: Marr & Holman; Feldman Co.
- Architectural style: Late-Victorian; Other mixed architectural styles
- Website: Fifth Avenue Historic District
- NRHP reference No.: 83004234
- Added to NRHP: December 5, 1983

Fifth Avenue Historic District is a historic neighborhood in Nashville, Tennessee. It was listed on the National Register of Historic Places listings in Davidson County, Tennessee (NRHP) in 1983.

== History ==
The district's homes were built between 1870 and 1930. The area began with residential homes but following the American Civil War (1870s to the 1890s) a commercial center grew with businesses selling women's clothing and furniture.

== Description ==
The area has been the retail center of Nashville, occupying 4.5 acres (1.8 ha). The boundaries of the neighborhood are Church Street to the south, Union Street to the north, Fourth Avenue to the east and Sixth Avenue to the west. One of the historic buildings in this district is the Woolworth building. In the 1960s, during the Civil rights movement, activists participated in lunch counter sit-ins or Nashville sit-ins, at what was then a Woolworth's Department Store. In 2021 the building came up for lease.
