= TCDD General Headquarters Building =

- TCDD Genel Müdürlük Binası
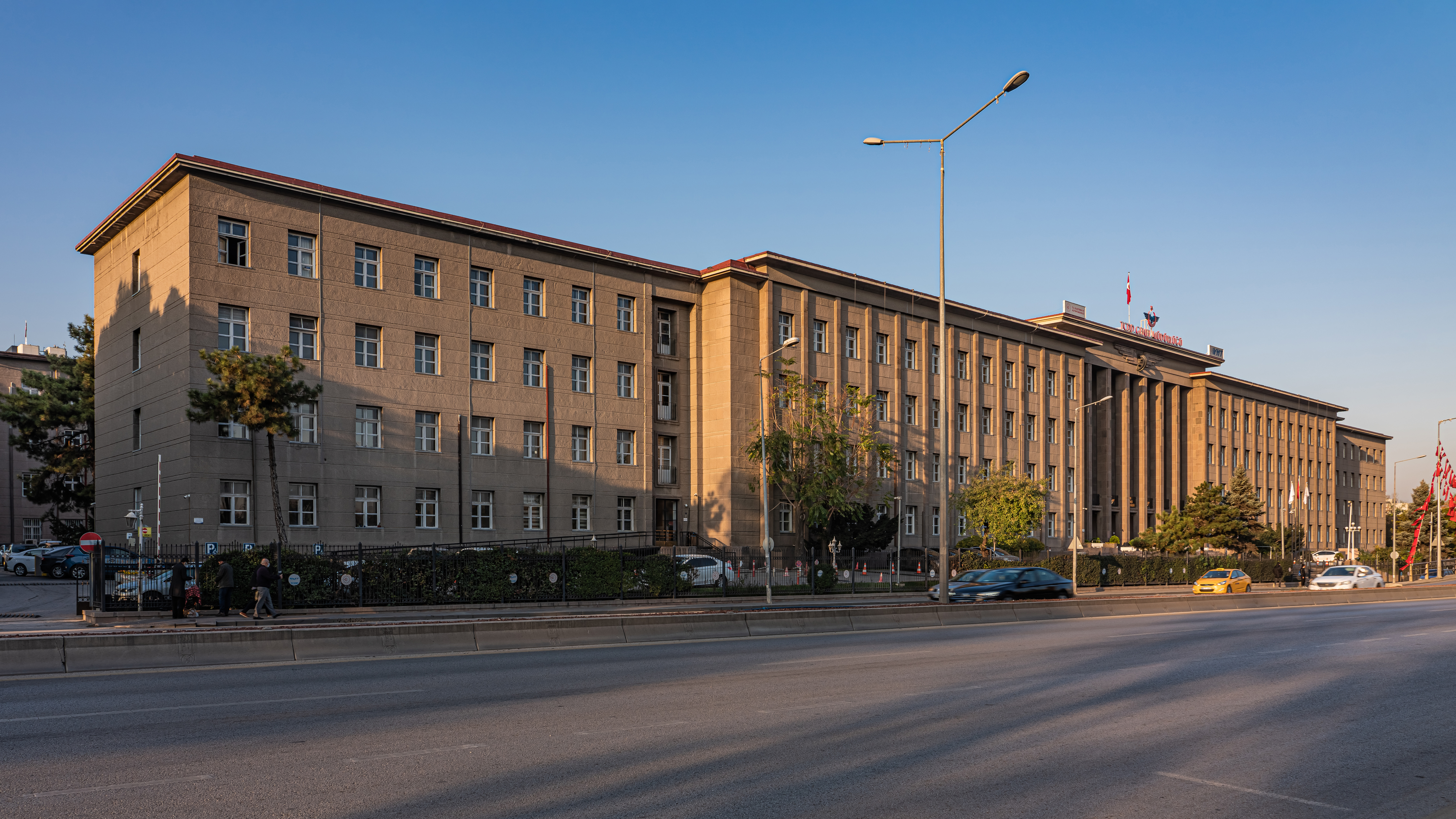
- The front facade of the building in 2021

- Location within Turkey

General information
- Architectural style: Turkish New Regionalism
- Location: Hipodrom Cd. 3, Anafartalar Mah., 06050, Altındağ, Ankara, Turkey
- Coordinates: 39.5616°N 32.5029°E
- Elevation: 2,802 ft (854 m)
- Current tenants: Turkish State Railways General Headquarters
- Groundbreaking: 1939
- Completed: 1941
- Owner: Turkish State Railways

Technical details
- Material: Reinforced concrete
- Floor count: 4

Design and construction
- Architect: Bedri Uçar

The Turkish State Railways General Headquarters Building (Turkish: Türkiye Cumhuriyeti Devlet Demiryolları Genel Müdürlük Binası) houses the general headquarters of the Turkish State Railways in Ankara, Turkey. It is located in Ulus in central Ankara adjacent to Ankara station on Hipodrom Avenue.

== Architecture ==
The building was one of the first examples of the Second national architectural movement, also known as Turkish New Regionalism. Containing elements of Fascist architecture and Stripped Classicism along with Turkish Neoclassicalism, it was constructed with reinforced concrete and the outer facade from stone. The marble for the colonnade at the north entrance was brought from Bilecik and Hereke as the color matches the stone. Wide steps to the main entrance promote a grandiose feeling, as is typical with fascist architecture.

== History ==
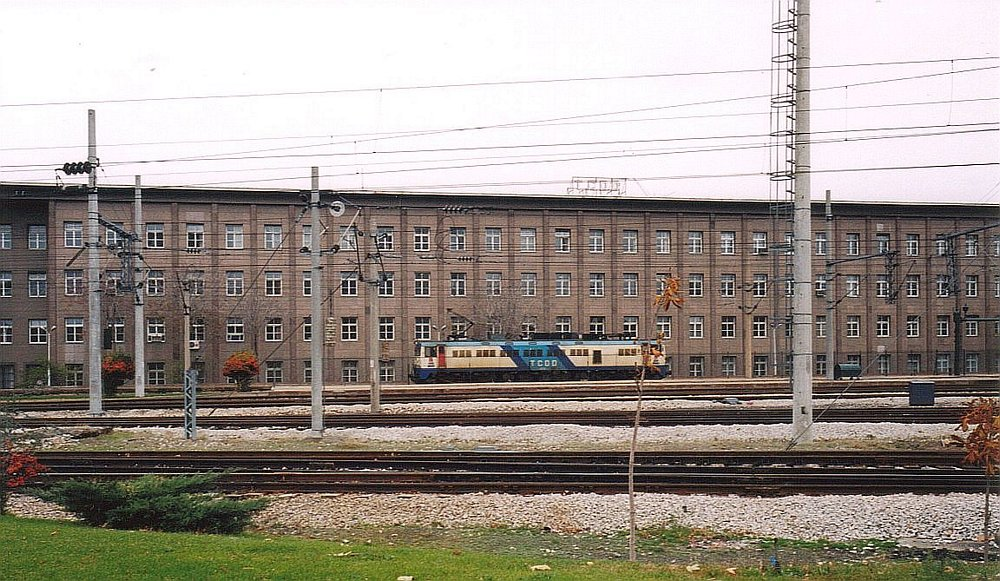
The rear (south) facade of the building, with an E43000 locomotive visible in the foreground.

Construction of the building began in 1939 on lands adjacent to the Ankara station building, which was just completed two years earlier in 1937. The direct predecessor to the Turkish State Railways, the State Railways and Seaports Administration (Turkish: Devlet Demiryolları ve Limanları Umum Müdürlüğü or DDYLUM), commissioned the project and selected Bedri Uçar to be the architect. Uçar designed the building in the Turkish New Regionalism style, which was influenced by the Fascist architecture of Italy and Nazi Germany. The building was to have two main entrances on the north and south sides, one on the street side and one on the track side; a central structure, in the shape of rectangle with a large courtyard, would have four wings, two on the east and two on the west sides. However, due to the request of a conference hall to be included and the inability to expand into the surrounding areas, the building's size was scaled down. The central structure along with the wings, originally planned with 3 floors and 2 floors respectively, were changed to include 4 floors on all three sections.

The central structure of the building was completed in 1941. The wings were added on later because DDYLUM contracted the central structure and wings as two separate projects. The first two wings were completed in 1958 on the street (north) side. The third wing (southeast) was completed in 1974 and the fourth (southwest) in 1979.

Finally, the conference hall in the courtyard was completed in 1986.

== See also ==
- Second national architectural movement
- Fascist architecture
