= Pickett County Courthouse =

- U.S. National Register of Historic Places
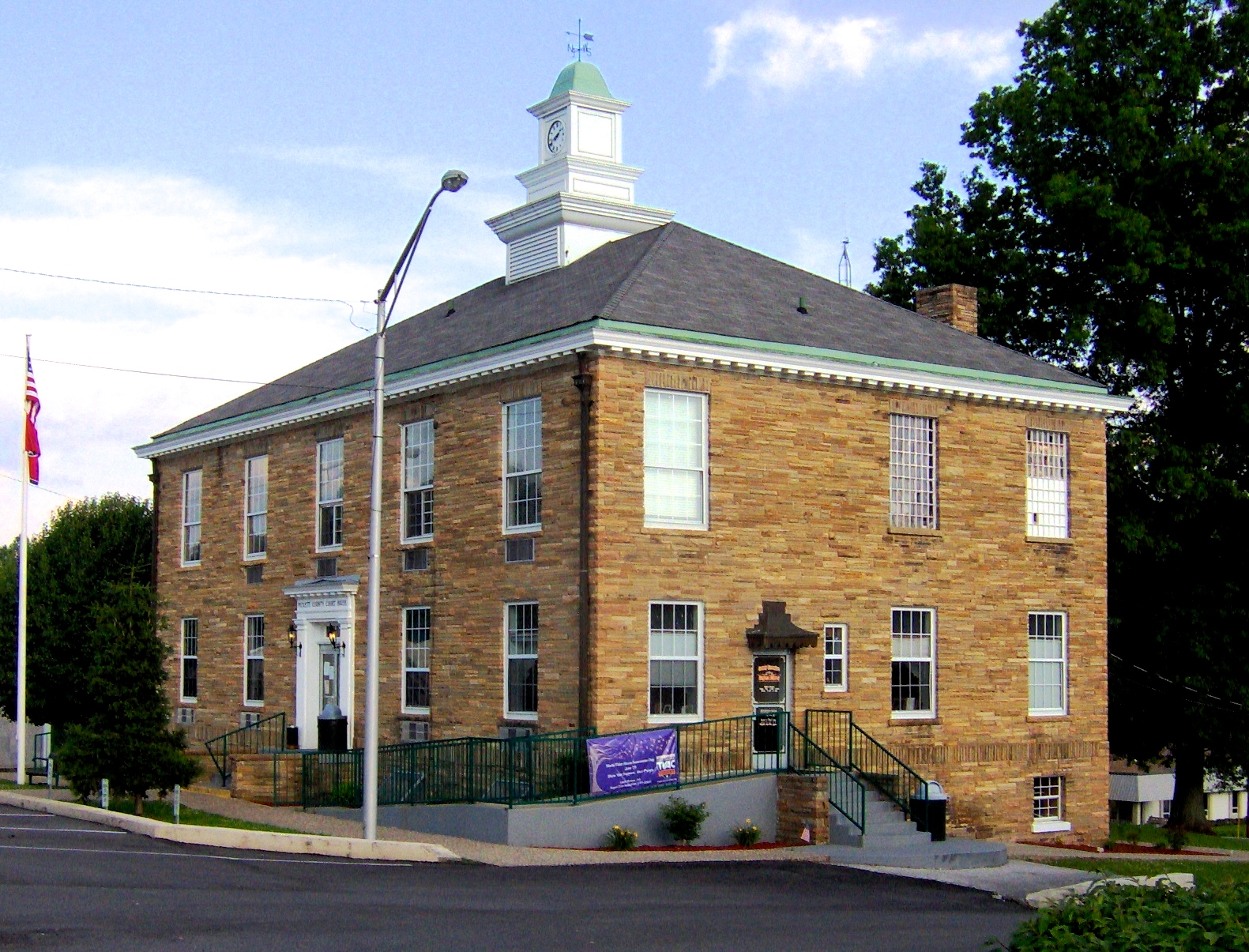

- Location within Tennessee Location within the United States
- Interactive map showing the location of Pickett County Courthouse
- Location: Town Square, Byrdstown, Tennessee
- Coordinates: 36°34′11″N 85°07′44″W
- Area: less than one acre
- Built: 1935
- Architect: Marr, Thomas; Holman, Joseph
- Architectural style: Colonial Revival
- MPS: Historic County Courthouses of Tennessee MPS
- NRHP reference No.: 95000338
- Added to NRHP: March 30, 1995

The Pickett County Courthouse is a historic building in Byrdstown, Tennessee, U.S.. It serves as the courthouse for Pickett County, Tennessee.

There have been two courthouses for Pickett County. The first one, completed in 1890, burned down in 1934. The second and current one was built with Crab Orchard stone in 1935.

The building was designed in the Colonial Revival architectural style by Marr & Holman. It has been listed on the National Register of Historic Places since March 30, 1995.
