= Obion County Courthouse =

- U.S. National Register of Historic Places
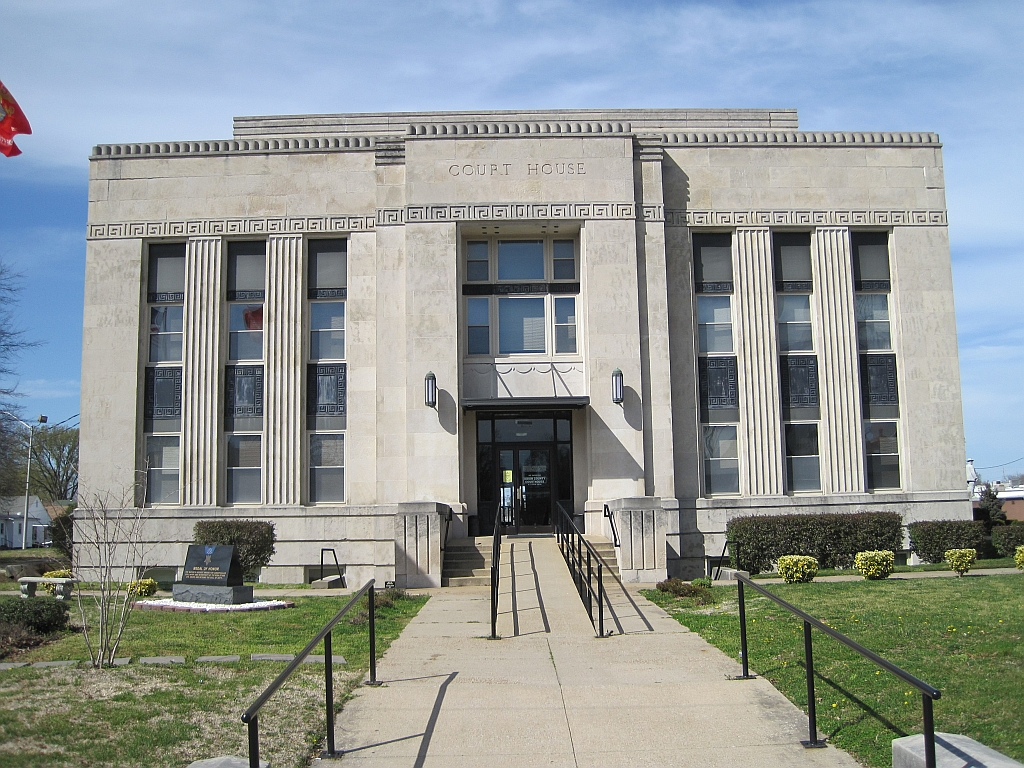

- Location within Tennessee
- Interactive map showing the location of Obion County Courthouse
- Location: Junction of Third and Washington Streets, Union City, Tennessee
- Coordinates: 36°25′24″N 89°03′33″W
- Area: less than one acre
- Built: 1939
- Architectural style: PWA Modern
- MPS: Historic County Courthouses of Tennessee MPS
- NRHP reference No.: 95000340
- Added to NRHP: March 30, 1995

The Obion County Courthouse is a historic building in Union City, Tennessee. It serves as the courthouse of Obion County, Tennessee.

The building was the third courthouse built for Obion County. The first one was built in Troy, Tennessee in 1890 and subsequently moved to Union City. A second courthouse was built in Union City. The third and current courthouse was built in 1939.

The building was designed in the PWA Moderne architectural style by Marr & Holman. It has been listed on the National Register of Historic Places since March 30, 1995.
