= Killing of Jocques Clemmons =

2017 police shooting in Nashville, Tennessee

- Date: February 10, 2017
- Time: Before 1 p.m.
- Location: James A. Cayce Homes parking lot, East Nashville, Tennessee, U.S.
- Participants: Joshua Lippert (shooter)
- Deaths: Jocques Clemmons

Jocques Clemmons, a 31-year-old, was fatally shot on February 10, 2017, in Nashville, Tennessee, United States, after a traffic stop where Clemmons pulled out a gun, leading to a confrontation with Joshua Lippert, a 32-year-old police officer. After an investigation, the Davidson County District Attorney declined to prosecute Lippert on all charges, a decision that was protested by several groups. After reviews at several levels of the Nashville Police and Tennessee Bureau of Investigation's work and reports, the U.S. Department of Justice closed the case in August 2017.

== Events ==
Clemmons ran a stop sign and stopped in the parking lot of the James A. Cayce Homes. He got out of the car and was armed. His gun fell to the ground during the altercation with Lippert. Clemmons picked up the weapon before Lippert shot him, once in the abdomen, once in the hip and twice in the back as he tried to run away.

On May 11, 2017, the district attorney of Davidson County, Glenn Funk, decided not to prosecute Lippert. The decision prompted criticisms from the NAACP, the ACLU and Black Lives Matter, and protesters gathered outside the residence of then Nashville Mayor Megan Barry.

In August 2017, the case was closed by three federal government agencies (the United States Attorney's Office in Nashville, the FBI and the United States Department of Justice Civil Rights Division) after they reviewed the investigations carried out by the Metropolitan Nashville Police Department and the Tennessee Bureau of Investigation. The decision was welcomed by the Fraternal Order of Police, which prompted protesters to leave banners on interstate overpasses criticizing them on the day of their annual conference in Nashville.

== Parties involved ==
=== Jocques Clemmons ===
Jocques Clemmons was a 31-year-old man. He was raised by his mother, Sheila Clemmons Lee, and his stepfather, Mark T. Lee. He had two sisters, Aja Tate and Britta Goodner. With Tameka Lewis, he had two children, aged 13 and 8.

Clemmons was arrested or given citations for driver's license violations 19 times in the past decade. Clemmons was sentenced to eight years in prison in 2014 for a cocaine conviction. By 2017, he was released on probation, and prohibited from carrying a gun.

=== Joshua Lippert ===
Joshua Lippert is a 32-year-old police officer with the Metropolitan Nashville Police Department.

== Shooting ==
The shooting occurred minutes before 1 PM in the parking lot of the James A. Cayce Homes, a housing project in East Nashville, Tennessee. The brick buildings are home to about 2,000 residents.

From his unmarked police car, Lippert saw Clemmons, who was driving a gray SUV, ran a stop sign. When Clemmons parked in the parking lot and got out of his car, he was apprehended by Lippert. Clemmons was carrying a loaded Ruger .357 Magnum gun, which fell to the ground. Lippert tried to keep Clemmons away from the gun but he picked it up and ran away between two parked vehicles; Lippert shot Clemmons once in the hip and twice in the back. Lippert picked up Clemmons' gun and put it in his own pocket.

Lippert and fellow officers performed first aid on Clemmons, to no avail. Clemmons was taken to the Vanderbilt University Medical Center, where he died from injuries during surgery.

== Shooting aftermath ==
Within a few hours on February 10, the area between Sylvan Street and Summer Place on South Sixth Street was closed, and 30-odd policemen and detectives were on the scene. Meanwhile, Lippert was put on a paid administrative assignment but not suspended. Both the Metropolitan Nashville Police Department and the Tennessee Bureau of Investigation began investigations. The two entities argued over the conduct of the simultaneous investigations, with the TBI suggesting interviewing witnesses twice was problematic. The TBI also threatened to stop their investigation if the MNPD continued theirs.

The Metropolitan Nashville Police Department initially said Clemmons and Lippert had two altercations. Later, video cameras showed there was only one.

Clemmons' family raised $11,000 through GoFundMe for his funeral, which was held on February 18, 2017.

On May 9, 2017, Lippert's attorney asked the Tennessee Bureau of Investigation to release their investigative report to the public.

On May 11, 2017, the Metropolitan Nashville Police Department released a 20-page Office of Professional Accountability report of their internal investigation. They concluded that Lippert believed he was "in imminent danger" because Clemmons was carrying a gun, and that he acted in self-defense. The conclusion parallels Lippert's statement, who said he thought Clemmons was going to kill him.

The same day, the district attorney of Davidson County, Glenn Funk, decided not to prosecute Lippert, concluding that Lippert had acted in self-defense. He was assisted in his decision by Marcus Floyd, the assistant district attorney general; Amy Hunter, the deputy district attorney general; Roger Moore, the deputy district attorney general; Byron Pugh, the assistant district attorney general; and Ed Ryan, assistant district attorney general. During the conference, Hunter suggested the police report included bias in favor of Lippert. In particular, the MNPD report, which was written only five hours after the shooting, called the incident a "justifiable homicide" and "completed." Nevertheless, both Nashville Mayor Megan Barry and Mark Gwyn, the director of the Tennessee Bureau of Investigation, supported DA Funk's decision not to prosecute Lippert.

Shortly after the decision was made public, a news conference was held by Clemmons' family in the Nashville office of the National Association for the Advancement of Colored People (NAACP). It was broadcast live on television, and #jocquesclemmons began trending on Twitter. They were joined by their lawyer and a grass-roots group called Justice for Jocques Coalition. During the news conference, their lawyer said the family rejected DA Funk's decision. His sister Aja added that they wanted to get Joshua Lippert dismissed from his position at the police department. Meanwhile, protesters began chanting "no justice, no peace."

Shortly after, the chief of the Metropolitan Nashville Police Department, Steve Anderson, gave another news conference, also broadcast live on television. Anderson rejected any notion of bias in their investigation.

The police investigation found that Clemmons' gun had been stolen from the home of a Tennessee Department of Correction employee in Ashland City in 2001; the woman initially thought a family member had taken it. Further investigations showed that the gun was sold at a gun show in Smyrna in October 2001.

On May 15, 2017, Clemmons' family declined to rule out filing a civil lawsuit against the city of Nashville.

Also on May 15, police chief Anderson sent a letter to Deputy District Attorney General Amy Hunter in which he said she had misrepresented the MNPD's report; he warned, "Failure to properly acknowledge your error will define your integrity and is likely to attract the attention of any governing or oversight body." On May 16, 2017, District Attorney Funk sent a letter to Mayor Barry responding to Anderson's contentions by saying, "Chief Anderson has responded to our suggestions for improving MNPD policy on terminology with personal attacks." The mayor responded by calling for better communication between the MNPD and the DA's office.

On May 19, 2017, Chancellor Ellen Hobbs Lyle ordered the Tennessee Bureau of Investigation report to be released to the public once it had been redacted. Four days later, she said the report would be posted on the DA's website from June 9, 2017 to July 10, 2017.

On May 31, 2017, Captain Harmon Hunsicker of the MNPD said they were unable to retrieve fingerprints from Clemmons's gun. In response, Clemmons's family suggested once again that they might sue the city of Nashville.

In August 2017, the investigations carried out by the MNPD and the TBI were reviewed and closed by the United States Attorney's office in Nashville, the FBI and the United States Department of Justice Civil Rights Division.

In early February, Clemmons's mother sued the MNPD to retrieve his phone with family pictures on it.

== Public response ==
On May 12, 2017, 70-odd protesters from the Justice for Jocques Coalition and Black Lives Matter dressed in black and carrying a coffin demonstrated in Hillsboro Village, a predominantly white neighborhood. The protesters included Clemmons' family. They walked from Fannie Mae Dees Park near the campus of Vanderbilt University, up Blakemore Avenue and 24th Avenue South, all the way to the residence of Nashville mayor Megan Barry on 20th Avenue South. The protesters were also carrying signs accusing Mayor Barry of being complicit in the DA's decision. They left the coffin outside her house.

On May 20, 2017, the Justice for Jocques Coalition, including Clemmons' parents, held a town hall meeting, but neither the mayor nor the DA came, and their representatives were unable to answer their questions. As for the police department, they did not respond to the invitation nor did they send anyone. A spokesperson for the coalition said, "We are asking to be heard because time and time again, we are dismissed, we are told that we are just a small group of loudmouths and that we'll eventually go away. [...] It does not appear to be politically expedient for them to show up and we want to show them that's not true, that we are indeed speaking for many people in the community."

An article published in the Nashville Scene in May 2017 suggested Funk could have charged Lippert with second-degree murder.

After the investigation was closed by the US Attorney's office, the FBI and the Justice Department in August 2017, the Fraternal Order of Police "released a statement in support of Lippert."

In November 2017, Clemmons's mother visited the MNPD with community activists to ask for Lippert's dismissal; two reporters, including Steven Hale of the Nashville Scene, were escorted out of the building for trespassing by the owner. The issue of Lippert's employment was again raised by Clemmons's mother in December 2017.

On February 7, 2018, an activist group called Community Oversight Now, including members of the Justice for Jocques Coalition, Black Lives Matter, Democracy Nashville, Gideon's Army, the Harriet Tubman House, and the No Exceptions Prison Collective, filed an ethics complaint with the Council Board of Ethical Conduct suggesting Mayor Barry's extramarital affair with Sergeant Robert Forrest of the MNPD may have influenced her objection to Lippert's dismissal and the establishment of a "citizen-led police accountability board" after the shooting. They also sent a letter to Vice Mayor David Briley about it. Barry denied being swayed by the incident in her decisions.

The Justice for Jocques Coalition held a rally outside East Police Precinct on February 8, 2018, calling for Lippert to be let go from his job at the MNPD. On February 10, 2018, a ceremony was held in Clemmons's honor in Kirkpatrick Park.

== Alleged race issues ==
The incident attracted criticism from leaders of the African-American community in Nashville.

Members of the Justice for Jocques Coalition alleged the incident highlighted systemic racism in the Metropolitan Nashville Police Department. The president of Nashville's NAACP chapter, Ludye Wallace, said it was "sad day for Nashville," adding "It's more likely you going to get sent to jail for kicking a dog than shooting a black man down in his back while he's running." Gideon's Army said they had collected data suggesting Lippert had a habit of stopping black drivers more often than white drivers.

The Nashville chapter of Black Lives Matter called for Lippert's dismissal, adding "Today Nashville, the liberal stronghold of Tennessee, joins the other numerous localities that fail to find fault or even recognize criminality in police officers when their violence and brutality takes the lives of black people." They argued that an independent community review board should be established. The American Civil Liberties Union (ACLU) of Tennessee agreed that the city of Nashville should establish an independent review board, and called for Nashville police officers to wear body cameras.

On May 15, 2017, members of the Minority Caucus of the Metropolitan Council of Nashville and Davidson County said the incident was "reflective of not just how the 'IT' city views and treats its black citizens, but also black elected officials." They added, "The black community is owed this courtesy. The Clemmons family is owed this courtesy. A black man was slain and no black member of the Council was contacted in advance of the announcement exonerating the officer."
