= Franklin County Courthouse (Tennessee) =

- U.S. National Register of Historic Places
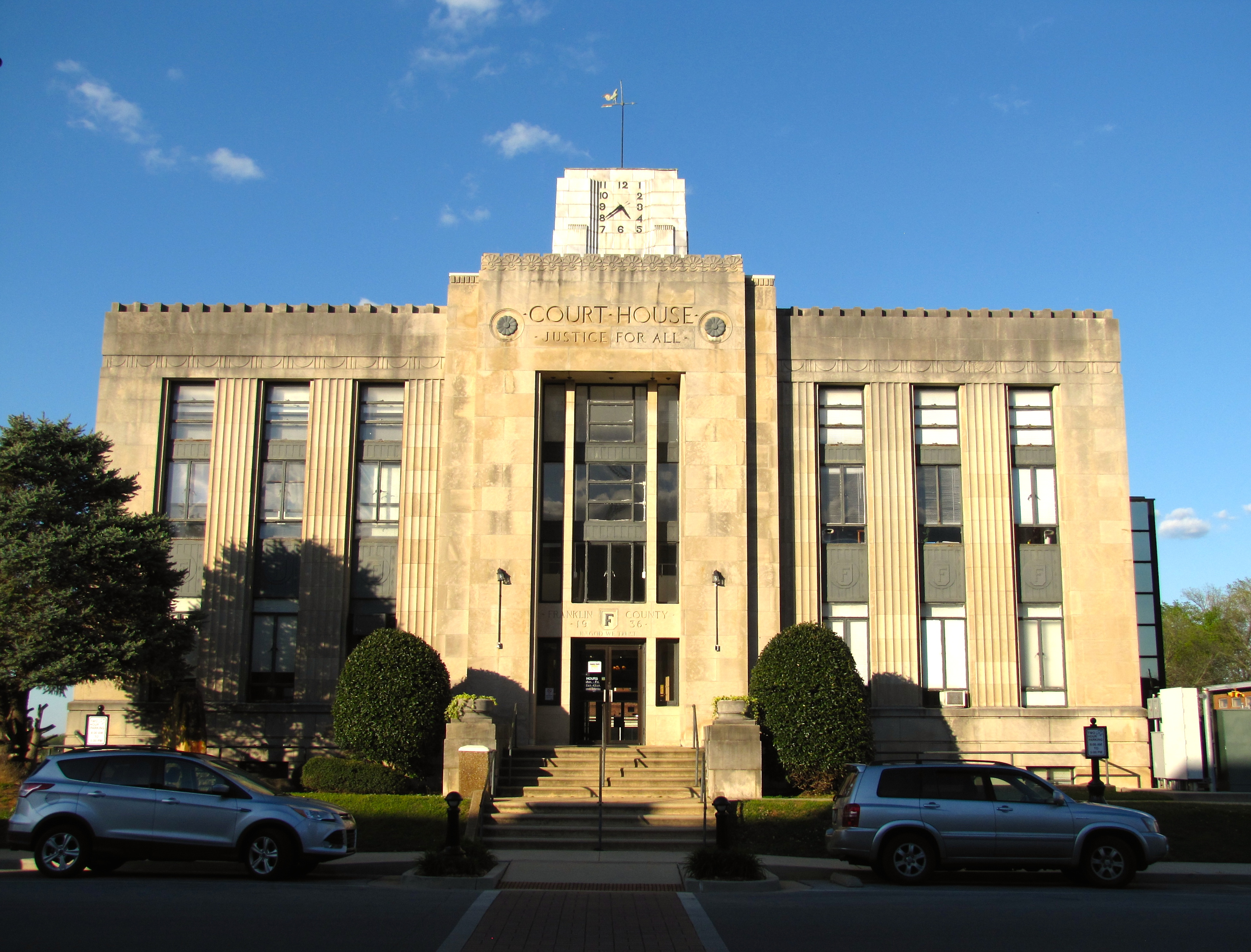

- Location within Tennessee Location within the United States
- Interactive map showing the location of Franklin County Courthouse
- Location: Public Square, Winchester, Tennessee
- Coordinates: 35°11′11″N 86°06′43″W
- Area: 0 acres (0 ha)
- Architectural style: PWA Modern
- MPS: Historic County Courthouses of Tennessee MPS
- NRHP reference No.: 95000345
- Added to NRHP: March 30, 1995

The Franklin County Courthouse is a historic building in Winchester, Tennessee, U.S. It is the courthouse of Franklin County, Tennessee.

The building was the third courthouse built for Franklin County. The first one was built in 1814 and the second one in 1839. The third and current courthouse was built in 1936–1937. It was built with funding from the Public Works Administration.

The building was designed in the PWA Moderne architectural style by Marr & Holman. It has been listed on the National Register of Historic Places since March 30, 1995.
