= Tennessee Supreme Court Building (Nashville) =

- U.S. National Register of Historic Places
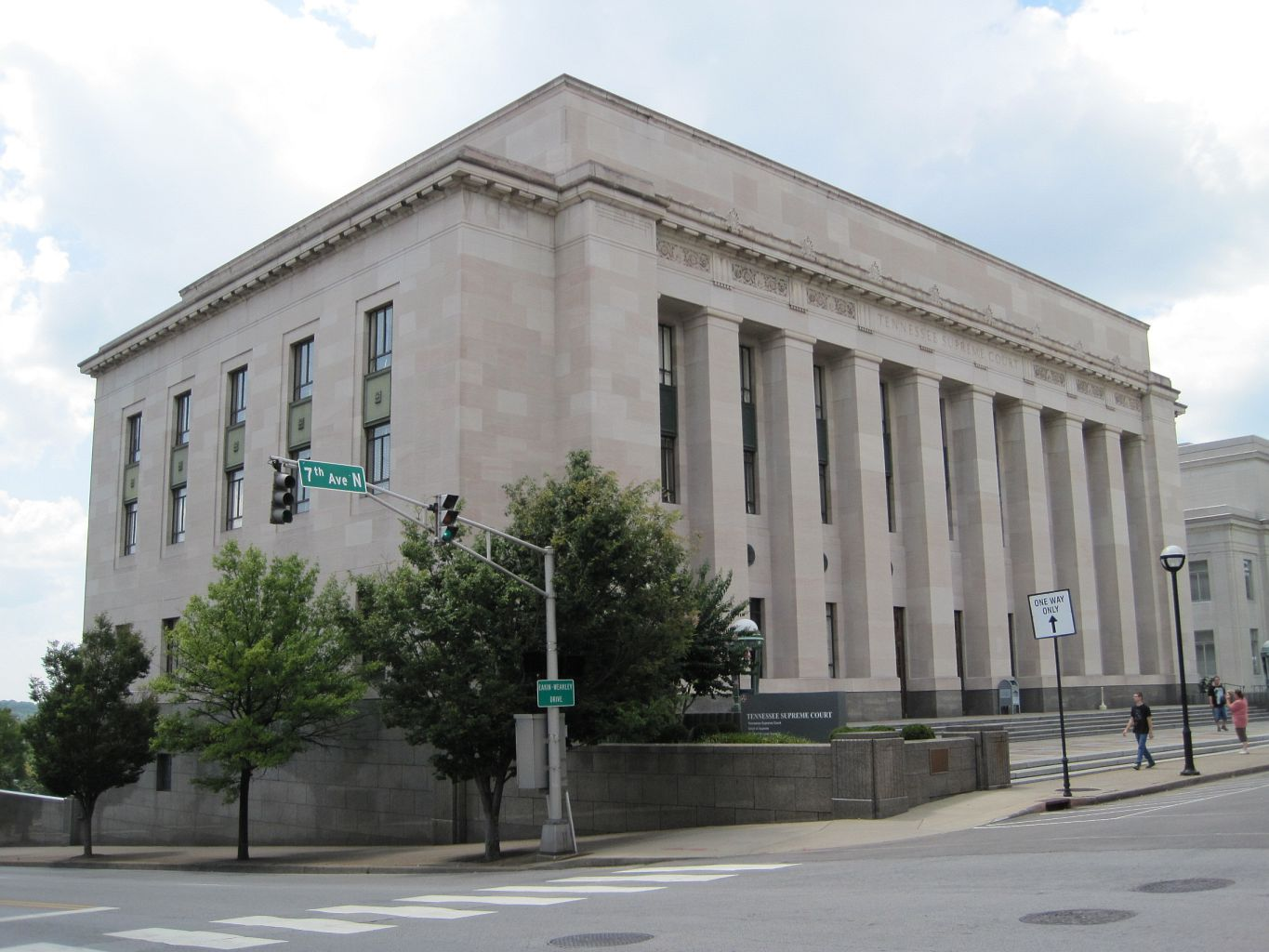

- Location within Tennessee Location within the United States
- Interactive map showing the location of Tennessee Supreme Court building
- Location: 401 7th Avenue North, Nashville, Tennessee
- Coordinates: 36.1648°N 86.7848°W
- Built: 1937
- Built by: Rock City Construction Company
- Architect: Marr & Holman
- Architectural style: Stripped Classicism
- NRHP reference No.: 14000084
- Added to NRHP: March 18, 2014

The Tennessee Supreme Court Building in Nashville, Tennessee, is the historic building that houses the Tennessee Supreme Court offices and where the court meets when it is in session in Nashville. It was listed on the National Register of Historic Places in 2014.

== History ==
The building, across from the Tennessee State Capitol at the corner of Charlotte Avenue and 7th Avenue North, was completed in 1937. Before its construction, the Supreme Court had occupied space in the Capitol.

The four-story building was designed by Nashville architects Marr & Holman in a style known as Stripped Classicism. It was built by Rock City Construction Company. It was listed on the National Register of Historic Places on March 18, 2014.

Parts of three films were shot in the court building: Marie in 1984, Last Dance in 1995, and Billy: The Early Years in 2008.

== Other Tennessee Supreme Court buildings ==
Other Tennessee Supreme Court buildings are located in Jackson and Knoxville. The Supreme Court building in Knoxville is also listed on the National Register.
