= Marr & Holman =

American architectural firm

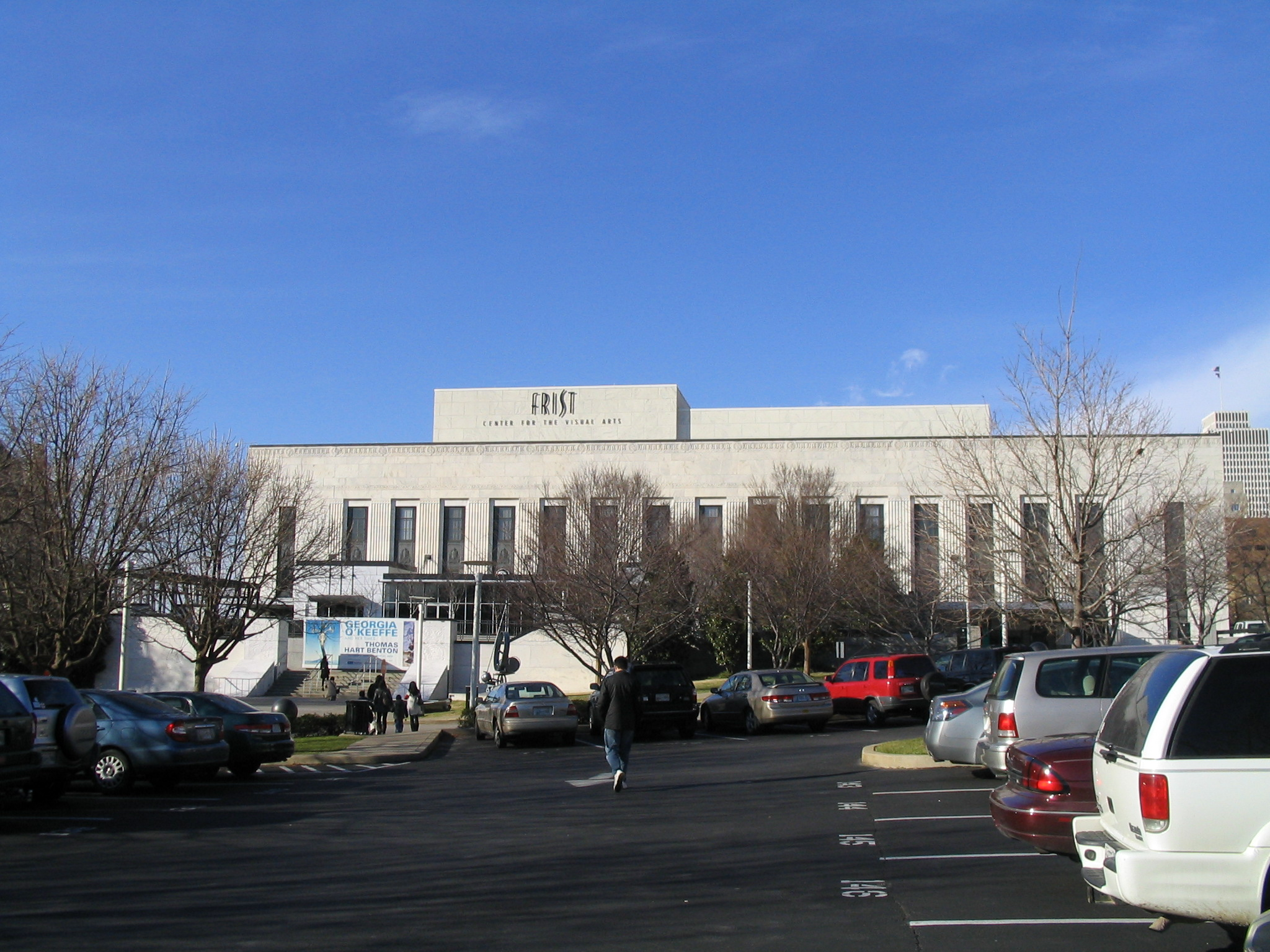
U.S. Post Office in Nashville, now Frist Center

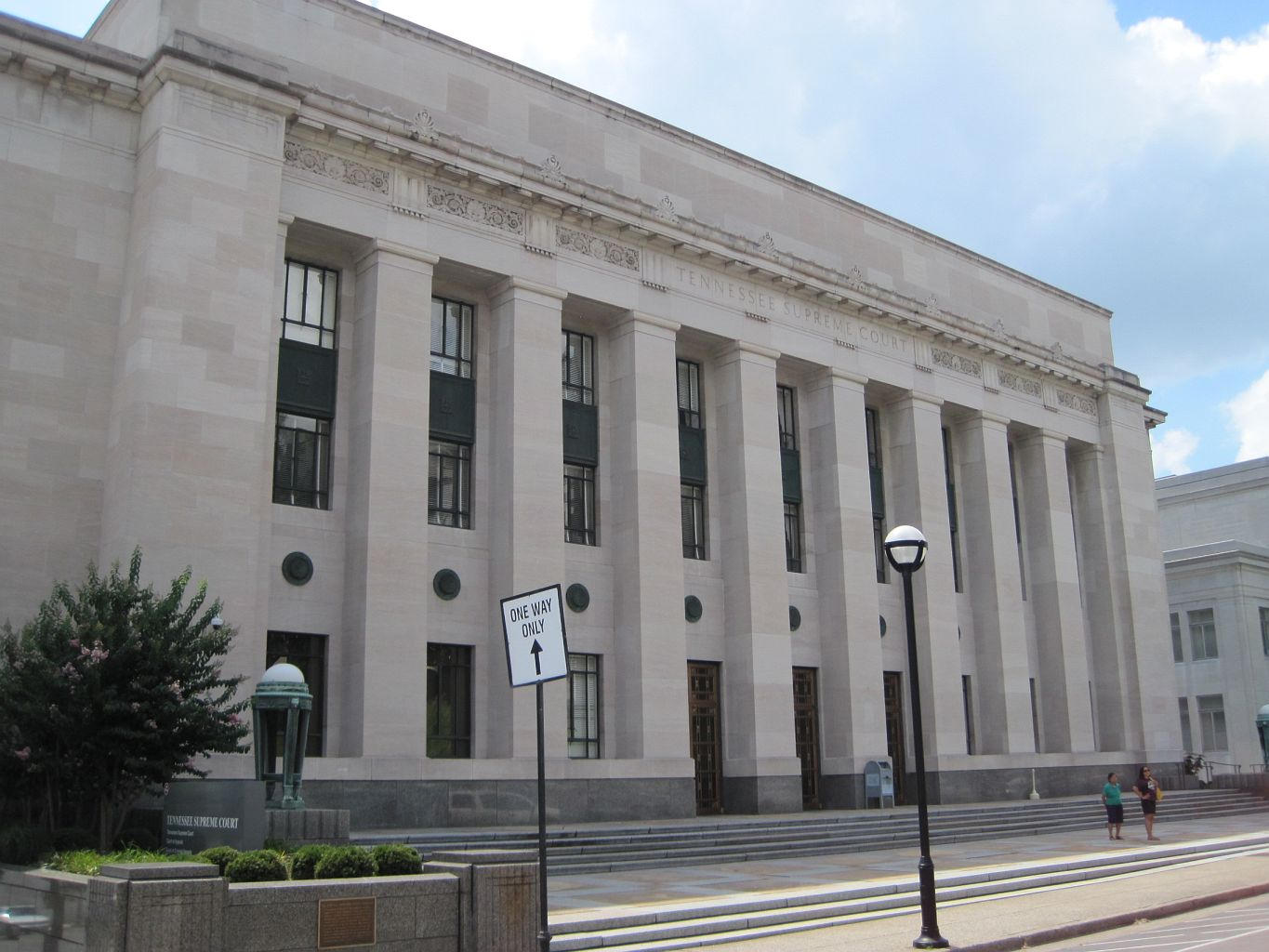
Tennessee Supreme Court Building in Nashville

Marr & Holman was an architectural firm in Nashville, Tennessee known for their traditional design. Notable buildings include the Nashville Post Office (now known as the Frist Art Museum) and the Milliken Memorial Community House in Elkton, Kentucky.

The firm was formed in 1913 with Joseph Holman (1890–1952) and Thomas Marr (1866–1936) as principals.

A number of their works are listed on the U.S. National Register of Historic Places.

Works include (with attribution):

- East Nashville High and Junior High Schools (built 1932), 110, 112 Gallatin Rd. Nashville, Tennessee, NRHP-listed
- Estes Kefauver Federal Building and United States Courthouse (1948–52), 801 Broadway, Nashville, NRHP-listed in 2016
- Federal Reserve Bank of Atlanta, 226 N. 3rd Ave., Nashville, NRHP-listed
- Franklin County Courthouse, Public Sq. Winchester, Tennessee, NRHP-listed
- James A. Cayce Homes, housing project in East Nashville
- James Robertson Hotel, 118 N. 7th Ave., Nashville, NRHP-listed
- Lauderdale County Courthouse, Town Sq. Ripley, Tennessee, NRHP-listed
- Madison County Courthouse, Public Sq. Jackson, TN, NRHP-listed
- Middle Tennessee State Teachers College Training School, 923 E. Lytle St. Murfreesboro, TN, NRHP-listed
- Morgan School, Built 1919 - Petersburg, Tennessee
- Nashville Municipal Auditorium
- Noel Hotel, 200-204 N. 4th Ave., Nashville, NRHP-listed
- Obion County Courthouse, jct. of Third and Washington Sts. Union City, Tennessee, NRHP-listed
- Pickett County Courthouse, Town Sq. Byrdstown, Tennessee, NRHP-listed
- Rich-Schwartz Building, 202-204 N. 6th Ave., Nashville, (with local contractor), NRHP-listed
- Tennessee Supreme Court Building, 401 Seventh Avenue North, Nashville, built in 1937 by Rock City Construction; NRHP-listed
- Union City Armory, 415 W. Main St., Union City, Tennessee, NRHP-listed
- United States Post Office (Nashville, Tennessee), 901 Broadway, Nashville, NRHP-listed
- One or more works in Tennessee School for the Deaf Historic District, 2725 Island Home Blvd. Knoxville, Tennessee, NRHP-listed
- One or more works in Fifth Avenue Historic District, Roughly bounded by Church and Union Sts., 4th, 5th, and 6th Aves., Nashville, NRHP-listed
- One or more works in Tennessee State University Historic District, 3500 John A. Merritt Blvd., Nashville, (Marr & Holman, et al.), NRHP-listed
