= Steve Anderson (police officer) =

American police chief

- Police career
- Department: Metropolitan Nashville Police Department
- Rank: Chief

Steve Anderson is the former Chief of the Metropolitan Nashville Police Department.

== Early life ==
Anderson attended Peabody High School in Trenton, Tennessee. He served in the United States Air Force, and earned a B.S. degree from Belmont University and a J.D. from the Nashville School of Law. He has three sisters.

== Metropolitan Nashville Police Department ==
Anderson joined the Metropolitan Nashville Police Department in 1975, and served in a variety of roles before becoming chief in 2010.

== Tenure as chief ==
During Anderson's tenure as chief, he gained some attention for his approach to persons protesting the 2014 Michael Brown and Eric Garner incidents. Anderson's approach involved a high degree of tolerance for non-violent protest, including having officers greet and shake hands with protesters. He was succeeded by John Drake.
