= WMDB =

Simulcast with WNVL Nashville
- Nashville, Tennessee; United States
- Broadcast area: Nashville
- Frequency: 880 kHz
- Branding: Activa 880 y 105.1

Programming
- Format: Regional Mexican

Ownership
- Owner: Mark Janbakhsh; (TBLC Media #2, LLC)
- Sister stations: WNVL

History
- First air date: 1983

Technical information
- Licensing authority: FCC
- Facility ID: 3540
- Class: D
- Power: 2,500 watts day 2 watts night
- Transmitter coordinates: 36°12′43.19910″N 86°49′8.99705″W

Links
- Public license information: Public file; LMS
- Webcast: Listen Live
- Website: WMDB Online

WMDB (880 AM) is a Regional Mexican-formatted radio station in Nashville, Tennessee. The station's power is 2,500 watts during the daytime hours. The station is currently owned by Mahan Janbakhsh, through licensee TBLC Media #2, LLC. Nighttime power is reduced to 2 watts to protect the signal of WHSQ in New York, New York. WHSQ is the dominant Class A signal on 880 AM.

== History ==
WMDB signed on the air in 1983 under the original owner, Reverend Morgan Babb. It was a black-oriented station with urban gospel in the morning, transitioning to secular rhythm & blues in the afternoon. Morgan Babb came up with the station's popular moniker slogan "The Big Mouth", because of WMDB's large daytime signal. Morgan Babb also claimed his secular R&B format was the "rock lite" format, drawing not just black listeners, but many white listeners as well. By 2000, the music format also included Hip Hop.

In May 2005, Reverend Morgan Babb sold WMDB to Peter Davison of Davidson Media Group, based out of Charlotte, North Carolina, according to FCC Records. The FCC granted the transfer of WMDB's license July 5, 2005. During this time period, Davidson Media Group purchased AM 1240, (then WNSG) in the Nashville market. Davidson Media Changed WNSG's call sign to WNVL on September 21, 2005. Shortly afterwards, Davidson Media Group would eventually flip both WMDB and WNVL to Spanish language formats.

On March 15, 2025, according to FCC records, WMDB went silent due to the loss of its tower-transmitter site. An STA (Special Temporary Authority) has been filed with the FCC to temporarily remain silent as TBLC Media #2, LLC is seeking to find an alternative site, a duplex opportunity, or a long wire emergency antenna option to return the WMDB back on the air.

Former logo
