= James A. Cayce Administration Service Building =

Historic building in Nashville, Tennessee

- U.S. National Register of Historic Places
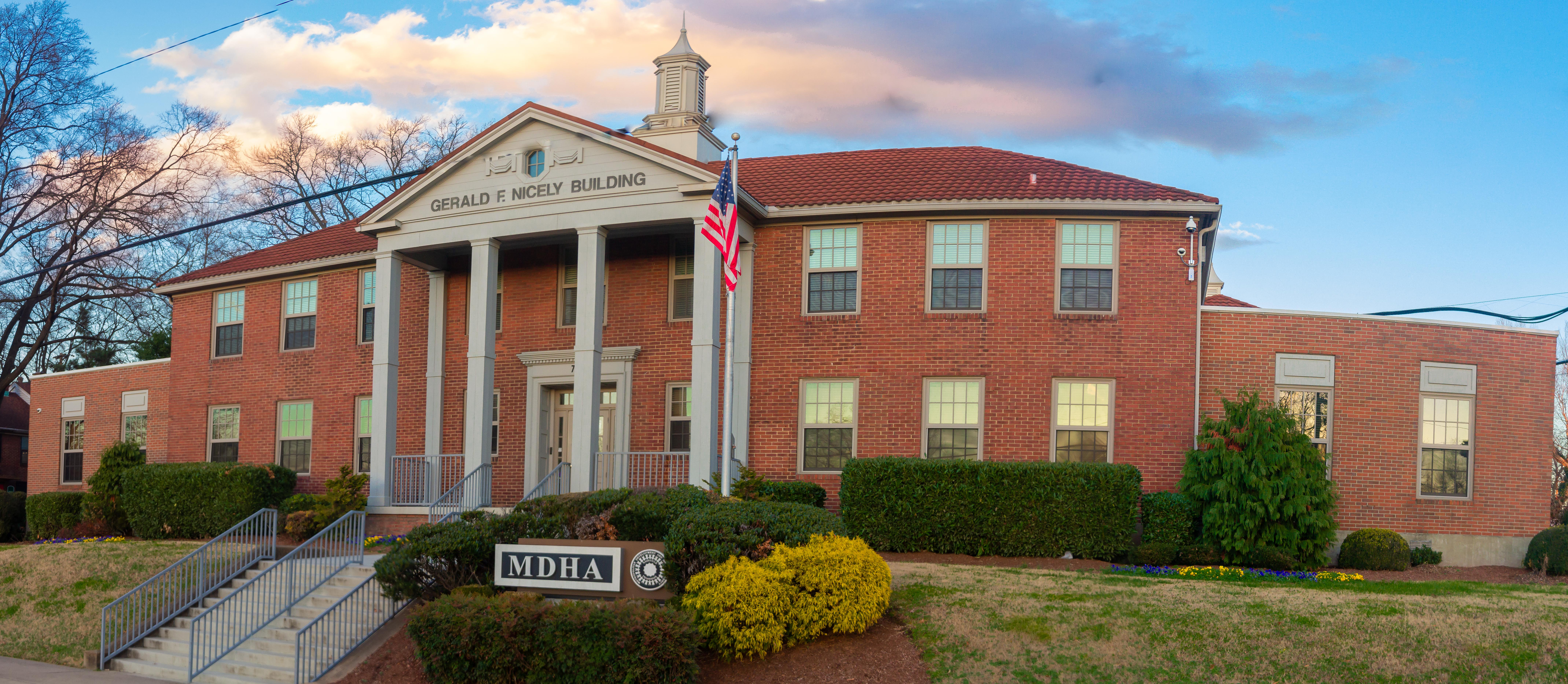
- James Cayce Administration Building

- Location within Tennessee Location within the United States
- Location: 701 S 6th Street Nashville, Tennessee
- Coordinates: 36.167222°N 86.756111°W
- Built: 1943
- Architect: Marr and Holman
- Architectural style: Classical Revival
- NRHP reference No.: 100004689
- Added to NRHP: December 13, 2019

The James A. Cayce Administration Service Building is a building located in Nashville, Tennessee. It was listed on the National Register of Historic Places listings in Davidson County, Tennessee in 2019.

== History ==
Architecture firm Marr and Holman designed the Classical Revival structure and it was completed in 1943. The building was home to the Nashville Housing Authority. In 1972 Nashville Housing Authority was later renamed the Metropolitan Development and Housing Agency (MDHA).

The building was added to the National Register of Historic Places listings in Davidson County, Tennessee (NRHP) on December 19, 2019. The building was added to the NRHP for two reasons: its historic role in Nashville’s public housing, and the architectural design of the structure.
