= Metropolitan Development and Housing Agency =

Municipal affordable housing agency in Nashville Tennessee

- MDHA

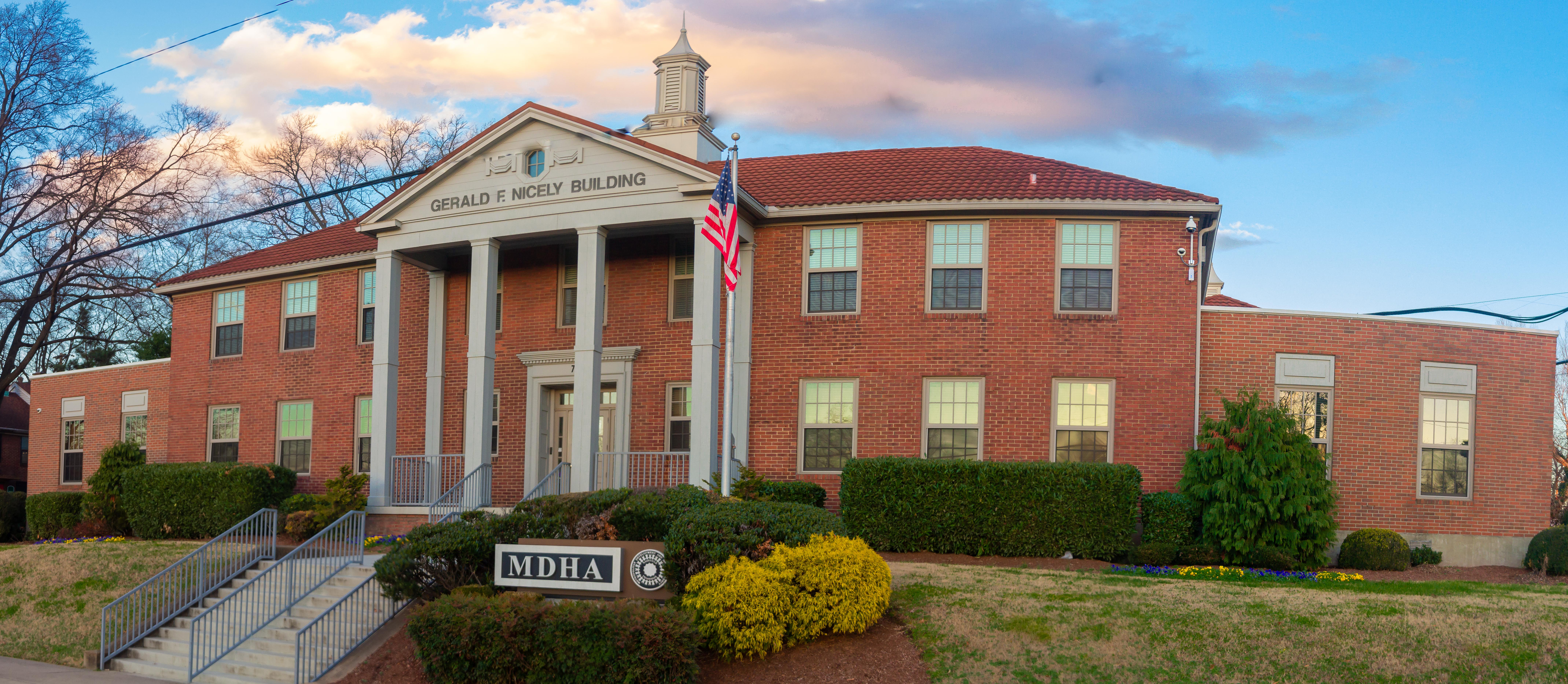
- MDHA building (formerly James Cayce Administration Building)

Agency overview
- Formed: February 19, 1973
- Preceding agency: Nashville Housing Authority
- Type: Municipal
- Jurisdiction: Nashville
- Status: Operational
- Headquarters: Gerald F. Nicely building 36.166111°N 86.758611°W
- Website: MDHA

Metropolitan Development and Housing Agency (MDHA; renamed in 1972) is a government agency in Nashville, Tennessee. The original agency was formed in 1938 and it was called the Nashville Housing Authority (NHA). The goal of the MDHA is to provide affordable housing for low income families. The agency also provides business and personal training to residents of low income housing.

== History ==
=== Nashville Housing Authority ===
The Nashville Housing Authority (NHA) was the predecessor to the MDHA it received approval by the City Council on Oct. 31, 1938. The housing authority was set up after the passage of the United States Housing Act of 1937. In December 1972 the NHA board recommended a name change to the Metro Development and Housing Agency (MDHA).

=== MDHA ===
The MDHA was established in 1972 and it was the successor to the Nashville Housing Authority. The executive director of the renamed organization was Jack D. Herrington. The MDHA website states that their mission is, "...to create affordable housing opportunities, support neighborhoods, strengthen communities and help build a greater Nashville."

In 2019 Mayor David Briley announced that the MDHA would use 25 million dollars to finance two low-income housing projects. The money was to be used for a 100 unit apartment complex in the Germantown area of Nashville and a 40 unit project to build townhomes inside the MDHA's "Envision Cayce development". In 2022 the MDHA announced that it was opening waiting lists for the affordable properties it operates. The agency operates several apartment buildings and complexes including the Sudekum Apartments which has 443 units. The MDHA provides rent for those in the Section 8 (housing) program and they provide tenant-based vouchers.

The organization also provides training for public housing tenants. The organization uses grant money from the city of Nashville to train residents in entrepreneurship, business and personal development and management. In addition to the training provided by the MDHA, residents can also apply for Low-interest loans which can be used for business ventures and real estate.

==== Amazon ====
In 2022 Amazon invested $10.6 million to renovate and build over 130 affordable homes in the city of Nashville. The money came from a two billion dollar "Amazon Housing Equity Fund" whose goal is to build or renovate 20,000 affordable homes for low income families in Washington state's Puget Sound region, the Arlington, Virginia, region and Nashville.

Amazon had previously partnered with the MDHA in May 2022, when it provided a $7.1 million low-interest loan to support construction costs of the Cherry Oak Apartments in Nashville. the 7.1 million loan has an interest rate of 2.5 percent and requires interest-only payments. The MDHA's planned to have 96 apartments in the new Cherry Oak Apartments and construction work began in May 2022.

== See also ==
- James A. Cayce Administration Service Building
