= Rich–Schwartz Building =

- U.S. National Register of Historic Places
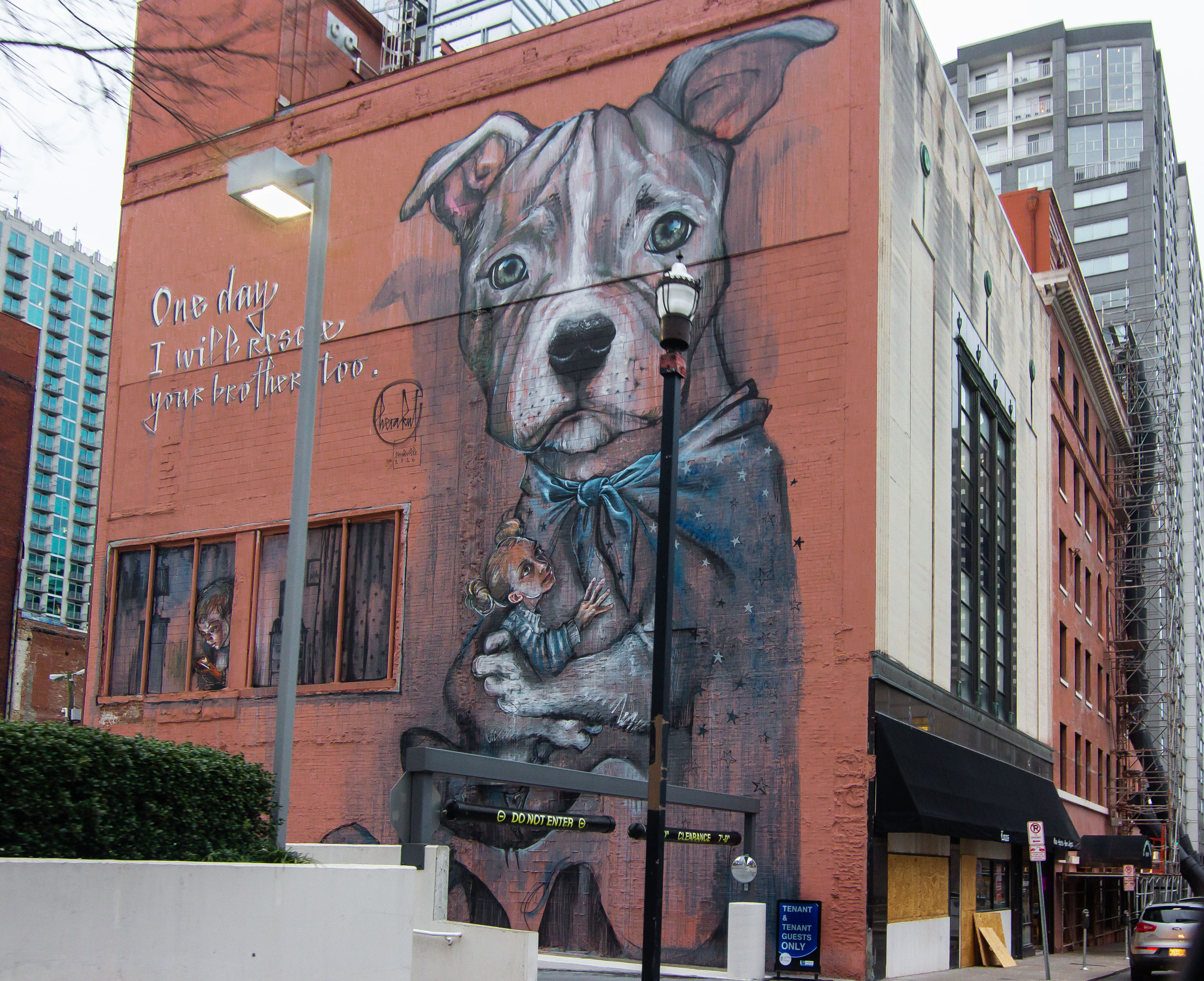
- The Rich–Schwartz Building in 2020

- Location within Tennessee Location within the United States
- Location: 202-204 N. 6th Ave., Nashville, Tennessee
- Coordinates: 36°9′47″N 86°46′56″W
- Area: 0.1 acres (0.040 ha)
- Built: 1936
- Built by: Marr and Holman
- Architect: Morris, Sidney, and Associates
- Architectural style: Art Deco
- MPS: Marr and Holman Buildings in Downtown Nashville TR
- NRHP reference No.: 84000091
- Added to NRHP: October 10, 1984

The Rich–Schwartz Building is a historic building in Nashville, Tennessee. Also known as the Rich, Schwartz & Joseph building, it is named for Julius Rich, Leo Schwartz, and Arthur Joseph.

== History ==
The four-story building was completed circa 1930. It was designed in the Art Deco style by the architectural firm Marr and Holman. It was built on land which belonged to Howell Campbell.

The building was listed on the National Register of Historic Places in 1984.

The building was featured in an article on the Nashville History blog page.
