= Metropolitan Nashville Police Department =

Law enforcement agency in Tennessee

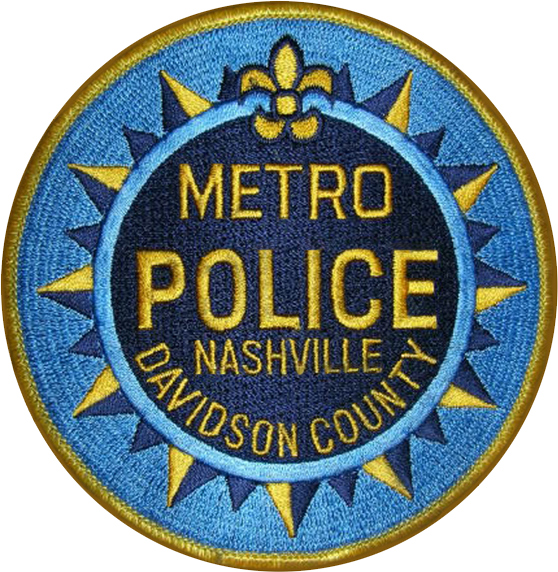
- Shoulder Patch
- Abbreviation: MNPD

Agency overview
- Formed: 1963
- Employees: 1,757 (2020)
- Annual budget: $289 million (2021)

Jurisdictional structure
- Operations jurisdiction: Nashville, Tennessee, United States
- Area: 525.94 sq mi (1,362.2 km2)
- Population: 665,498 (2018)
- Legal jurisdiction: Nashville and Davidson County, Tennessee
- General nature: Local civilian police

Operational structure
- Officers: 1315
- Agency executive: John Drake, Chief of Police
- Precincts: 9: West (1); East (2); South (3); Central (4); Hermitage (5); North (6); Madison (7); Midtown Hills (8); Southeast (9)

Facilities
- Airbases: 1
- Police Boats: 13
- Helicopters: 8
- Dogs: 18
- Horses: 12

Website
- www.nashville.gov/police

The Metropolitan Nashville Police Department, commonly known in the area as Metro Police, is the primary provider of law enforcement services for Metropolitan Nashville and Davidson County, Tennessee. The MNPD covers a total area of 526.1 square miles (1,363 km^{2}) that encompasses everything from high density urban locations to rural areas.

== History ==
The Nashville Police Department was formed in 1806. The department became the Metropolitan Nashville Police Department in 1963, when the city of Nashville and Davidson County consolidated into a single city-county government.

=== Blue Lites ===
The Blue Lites were a rock and roll musical band whose members worked for the Metropolitan Nashville Police Department. The band was founded in 1972 and was active from the 1970s-80's. The band performed in many public schools in Nashville. The band performed at the dedication of Riverfront Park in 1983, at a fundraiser for the American Red Cross in 1987, and at various fundraisers for other non-profit organizations in 1988.

== Composition and organization ==
The department personnel includes over 1450 full-time sworn members. The department responds to more than 950,000 police calls per year on average. The most recent census ranked Nashville as the 21st largest U.S. city. In 2000 the Department of Justice ranked the Metropolitan Nashville Police Department as the 36th largest U.S. police department.

The department is configured in a decentralized format, providing its precinct commanders with control of their own resources to address issues and crime trends in their areas. The department is divided into nine precincts: North, South, Southeast, East, West, Central, Hermitage, Madison, and Midtown Hills. A precinct is designed similarly to a medium-sized police department, with uniform patrol, undercover officers, directed patrol officers, plainclothes detectives, and other specialties. In February 2019, a new headquarters was opened at 600 Murfreesboro Pike. This replaced the old headquarters, which was located at 200 James Robertson Parkway.

The precincts are supported by Administrative Services, Investigative Services, and Special Operations Division personnel, all in an effort to deter, detect, prevent, and respond to criminal trends in the precinct areas. The department's entire focus is on how to quickly identify trends and implement initiatives that address them.

== Rank structure ==
The rank structure of the MNPD is as follows:

Title	Insignia
Chief of Police	
Assistant Chief	
Deputy Chief	
Inspector	
Commander	
Captain	
Lieutenant	
Sergeant	
Field Training Officer	
Police Officer/Detective	(no insignia)
Police Officer Trainee	(no insignia)

== Operation Safer Streets ==
Since 2005, the Metropolitan Nashville Police Department has been involved in Operation Safer Streets. Due to the growing gang problem on the streets of Nashville with gangs such as Kurdish Pride, Brown Pride, MS-13, Bloods, and Crips, the department has set up surveillance in the South Nashville neighborhoods to put pressure on the gang members. The team had originally only 14 officers who worked Friday, Saturday, and Sunday. These 14 officers stepped up Patrol in areas that have had a high concentration of gang activity, which include Madison and Antioch areas. In March 2008, the department added 23 more officers to the anti-gang team. Then-Chief of Police Ronal W. Serpas stated that this step up in patrol was intended to send a message that he would not tolerate gang activity in Nashville.

In August 2009 Nashville appeared on Season Five Episode 11 ("Hunt and Kill") of the TV Show Gangland featuring the street gang, "Brown Pride". This show highlights several local gang members, both arrested and out on the street, who talk about their lives in the gangs.

Activists disputes that Operation Safer Streets is effective and alleges that the program has disproportionately affected black and brown neighborhoods.

== Nashville School Shooting ==
On March 27, 2023, officers from the Metropolitan Nashville Police Department responded to the 2023 Nashville school shooting at the Covenant Presbyterian Church's Covenant School, where 7 people died; 3 students, 3 teachers, and the shooter, a transgender man named Aiden Hale (born Audrey Elizabeth Hale), who was a former student of the school. It took Police just 14 minutes from the first 911 call being placed at 10:13am local time, to the shooter being killed by police, at 10:27am local time. The shooting gives out a stark contrast to how authorities in Uvalde responded to the Uvalde school shooting back on May 24, 2022, where officers waited for 77 minutes, before a United States Border Patrol BORTAC team killed the shooter.

== See also ==
- Killing of Jocques Clemmons
- List of law enforcement agencies in Tennessee
