= Lauderdale County Courthouse (Tennessee) =

- U.S. National Register of Historic Places
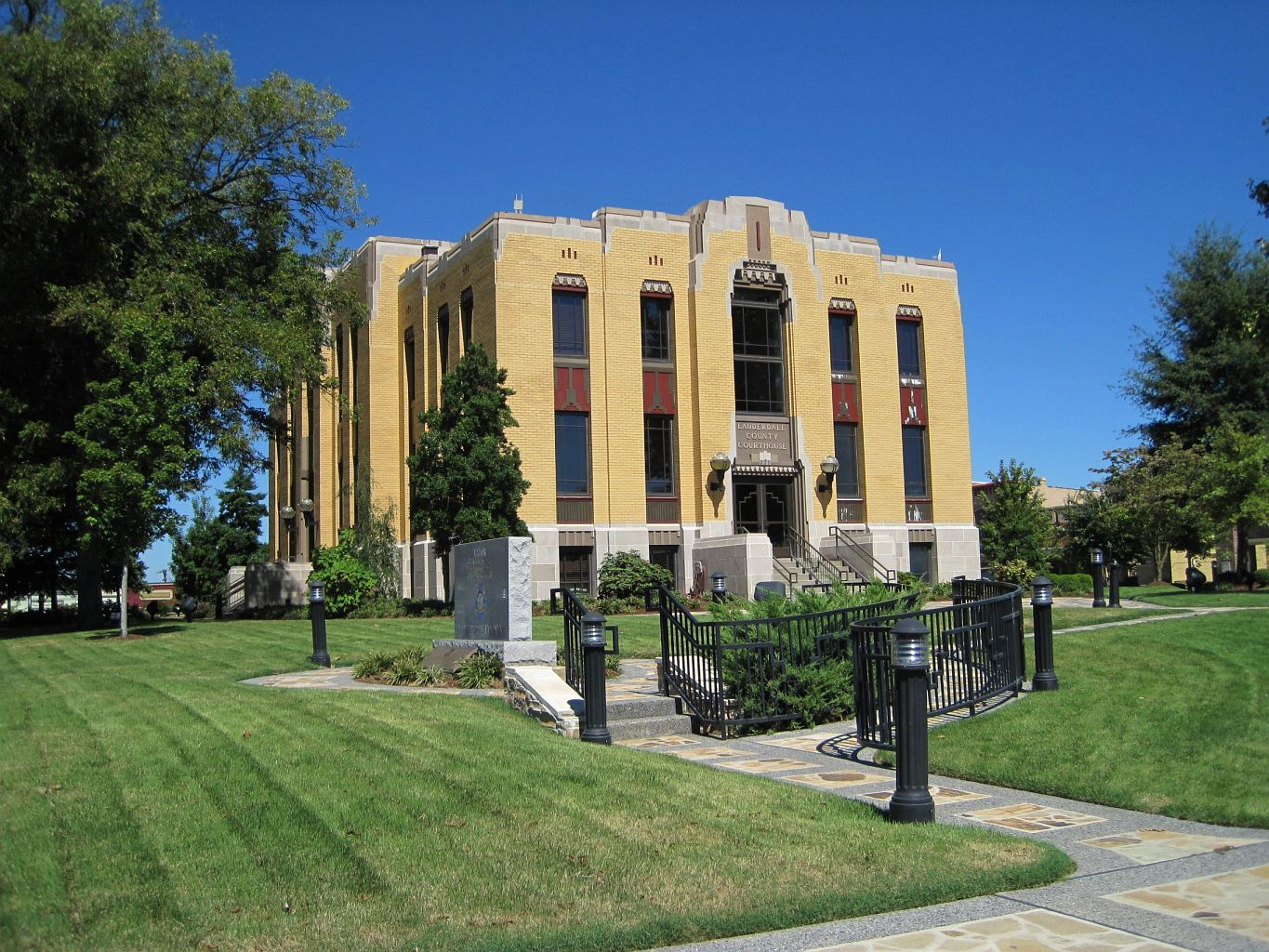

- Location within Tennessee Location within the United States
- Location: Town Square, Ripley, Tennessee
- Coordinates: 35.745833°N 89.530278°W
- Area: less than one acre
- Built: 1936
- Built by: Thomas Marr; Joseph Holman
- Architectural style: PWA Moderne
- MPS: Historic County Courthouses of Tennessee MPS
- NRHP reference No.: 95000343
- Added to NRHP: March 30, 1995

The Lauderdale County Courthouse is a PWA Moderne-style courthouse built in 1936. It was listed on the National Register of Historic Places.

The two-story-plus-basement building's most prominent feature is its "vertical stepped massing". Its central block is 50 by 55 feet (15 m × 17 m) in plan, and 40 feet (12 m) tall. It has wings which are each 25 by 50 feet (7.6 m × 15.2 m) in plan and 35 feet (11 m) tall.

It was designed by Nashville architects Marr and Holman and was built by R. M. Condra Contractors. It was the first Public Works Administration-funded courthouse completed in Tennessee.
