= Noelle Nashville Hotel =

- Noel Hotel
- U.S. National Register of Historic Places
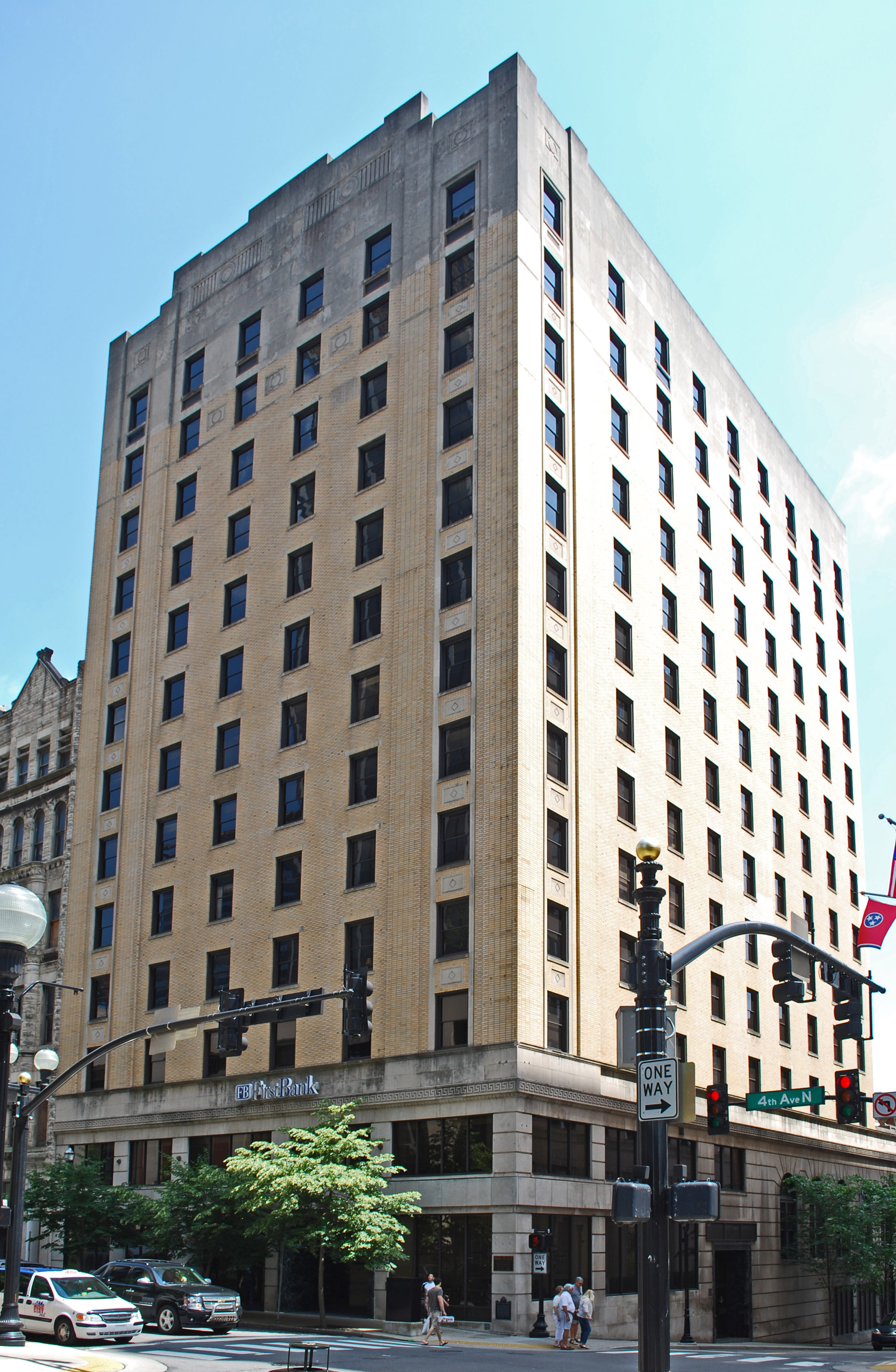
- Operating as the Noel Place office building in 2010

- Location within Tennessee Location within the United States
- Location: 200-204 N. 4th Ave., Nashville, Tennessee
- Coordinates: 36°9′50″N 86°46′46″W
- Area: 0.3 acres (0.12 ha)
- Built: 1929
- Architectural style: Classical Revival
- MPS: Marr and Holman Buildings in Downtown Nashville TR
- NRHP reference No.: 84000090
- Added to NRHP: October 10, 1984

The Noelle Nashville Hotel is a historic Art Deco hotel in Nashville, Tennessee, USA. It was originally opened in 1929 as the Noel Hotel.

== History ==
The 12-story Noel Hotel was constructed with steel and concrete. It was completed in 1929. It was designed in the Classical Revival style by the architectural firm Marr and Holman. It was named after the Noel family, who owned the land upon which it was built.

It has been listed on the National Register of Historic Places since October 10, 1984.

The structure served for many years as an office building, known as Noel Place.

It was converted back to a hotel in 2017, with the spelling of the name slightly changed to Noelle.
