= WCBH =

- Casey, Illinois; United States
- Broadcast area: Effingham, Illinois; Terre Haute, Indiana
- Frequency: 104.3 MHz
- Branding: 104.3 The Party

Programming
- Format: Top 40 (CHR)

Ownership
- Owner: Cromwell Radio Group; (The Cromwell Group, Inc. of Illinois)
- Sister stations: WWGO, WMCI

History
- First air date: September 19, 1988

Technical information
- Licensing authority: FCC
- Facility ID: 19050
- Class: B1
- ERP: 11,000 watts
- HAAT: 151.0 meters (495.4 ft)
- Transmitter coordinates: 39°16′24.13442″N 87°55′39.11674″W

Links
- Public license information: Public file; LMS
- Webcast: Listen Live
- Website: https://www.1043theparty.com

WCBH (104.3 FM) is a CHR/Top 40 radio station licensed to Casey, Illinois, United States. The station serves the Terre Haute, Indiana, and Mattoon/Effingham, Illinois, areas and points in between, and is currently owned by Cromwell Radio Group, through licensee The Cromwell Group, Inc. of Illinois.
