= WCRC (FM) =

- Effingham, Illinois; United States
- Frequency: 95.7 MHz

Programming
- Format: country music

Ownership
- Owner: Cromwell Radio Group; (The Cromwell Group, Inc. of Illinois)
- Sister stations: WCRA, WHQQ, WJKG

Technical information
- Licensing authority: FCC
- Facility ID: 19048
- Class: B
- ERP: 50,000 watts
- HAAT: 146.0 meters (479.0 ft)
- Transmitter coordinates: 39°06′26.15159″N 88°33′44.18054″W

Links
- Public license information: Public file; LMS
- Webcast: Listen LIve
- Website: effinghamradio.com

WCRC (95.7 FM) is a radio station licensed to Effingham, Illinois, United States. The station is currently owned by Cromwell Radio Group, through licensee The Cromwell Group, Inc. of Illinois. Its current format consists of country music.
