= David Lee Orr =

American entrepreneur and social media influencer

- Born: 1991 (age 34–35); Effingham, Illinois, U.S.
- Occupations: Entrepreneur, social media influencer

David Lee Orr (born 1991) is an American entrepreneur and social media influencer from Effingham, Illinois. While attending the University of Arizona, Orr was branded an “influencer” by Fast Company magazine for his use of Twitter accounts.

While a teenager, Orr founded the e-commerce website fruper.com and following college he began to focus on social media marketing, primarily via Twitter. This involved posting on various platforms detailing his personal travel exploits as well as running several parody and humor accounts.
