= Cromwell Radio Group =

The Cromwell Group, Inc.
- Industry: Entertainment
- Headquarters: Nashville, Tennessee
- Key people: Bayard H. Walters, President
- Products: Radio
- Website: cromwellradio.com

Cromwell Radio Group is a privately held radio broadcasting company based in Nashville, Tennessee. They currently own and operate 32 stations:

== History ==
Cromwell Radio Group was founded in 1969 when Bayard H. "Bud" Walters (still company president today) applied to the Federal Communications Commission for permit to construct WKCM, a country-formatted AM station in Hawesville, Kentucky. That station, which went on the air in November 1972, is still owned by Cromwell today. The company has since grown by building new stations from scratch, or buying underdeveloped stations and increasing the power and performance of those stations.

In 1990 Cromwell expanded into Tennessee with the acquisitions of WQZQ-FM (now WPRT-FM) & WYCQ-FM (now WBUZ), both located in Nashville, Tennessee. At this same time, Cromwell also relocated its corporate headquarters from Hawesville, Kentucky to Nashville, Tennessee.

In each market where Cromwell is present, they have now increased the number of stations owned to three or more (as of 2011, the FCC allows a single company to own a maximum of five FM stations and two AM stations in any given market; however this ownership limit does not apply to translator stations, as they are exempted by the FCC).

== Radio Stations owned by The Cromwell Group ==
AM & FM Stations	FM Stations	HD Stations

Market	Station/ Frequency	Format	Notes
=== Tennessee ===
Nashville	WBUZ 102.9 FM	HD1 - Active rock HD2 - WPRT-FM Simulcast; HD3 - WQZQ Simulcast; HD4 - Classic hits ("Totally Hits Nashville")	
Nashville	WPRT-FM 102.5 FM	HD1 - Sports; HD2 - Urban adult contemporary ("102.1 The Ville"); HD3 - WAY FM; HD4 - Classic hits ("Totally Hits Nashville")	
Nashville	WQZQ 830 AM	Sports	
=== Kentucky ===
Owensboro	WBIO/WKCM 94.7 FM/92.1 FM/97.9 FM/1160 AM	Classic Country	
Owensboro	WXCM 97.1 FM	HD1 - Mainstream rock HD2 - Currently Silent; HD3 - Classic hip-hop ("100.5 The Vibe")	
Owensboro	WTCJ 93.3 FM / 98.7 FM / 106.7 FM	Adult Hits/Jack FM	
Owensboro	WVJS 1420 AM / 92.9 FM	Oldies from the 70's/80's/90's	
Owensboro	WLME 102.7 FM	Sports	
Owensboro	WCJZ 105.7 FM	Classic rock	
=== Illinois ===
Decatur	WEJT 105.1 FM	Adult hits/Jack FM	
Decatur	WYDS 93.1 FM	HD1 - Top 40/CHR; HD2 - Urban AC "Magic 98"; HD3 - Classic country "Griz FM"	
Decatur	WZNX 106.7 FM	HD1 - Mainstream rock HD2 - Currently Silent; HD3 - Sports ("106.3 The Game")	
Decatur	WZUS 100.9 FM	News/Talk	
Mattoon	WMCI 101.3 FM	Country	
Mattoon	WCBH 104.3 FM	Top 40/CHR	
Mattoon	WWGO 92.1 FM	HD1 - Classic rock HD2 - Sports ("Victory 103.9")	
Effingham	WCRC 95.7 FM	Country	
Effingham	WCRA 1090 AM / 99.5 FM / 96.3 FM	News/Talk	
Effingham	WHQQ 98.9 FM	Sports	
Effingham	WJKG 105.5-100.5 FM	Adult hits/Jack FM	
Vandalia	WKRV 107.1 FM	Classic hits	
Vandalia	WPMB 1500 AM / 104.7 FM	Adult Contemporary	
=== Indiana ===
Tell City	WTCJ 1230 AM / 93.3 FM	Adult hits	
