= WKCM =

Radio station in Hawesville, Kentucky

Simulcasts WBIO Philpot
- Hawesville, Kentucky; United States
- Broadcast area: Owensboro, Kentucky
- Frequency: 1160 kHz
- Branding: WBIO Classic Country

Programming
- Format: Classic country

Ownership
- Owner: Cromwell Radio Group; (Hancock Communications, Inc.)
- Sister stations: WBIO, WLME, WTCJ, WCJZ, WVJS, WXCM

History
- First air date: November 7, 1972

Technical information
- Licensing authority: FCC
- Facility ID: 25966
- Class: D
- Power: 2,500 watts day 55 watts night
- Transmitter coordinates: 37°54′20″N 86°45′30″W

Links
- Public license information: Public file; LMS
- Webcast: Listen Live
- Website: www.owensbororadio.com/wbio/

WKCM (1160 AM) is an American radio station licensed to serve the community of Hawesville, Kentucky. The station is owned and operated by Hancock Communications, Inc., doing business as the Cromwell Radio Group, and the station's broadcast license is held by Hancock Communications, Inc.

WKCM broadcasts a classic country music format to the greater Owensboro, Kentucky, area.

== History ==
The station signed on the air on November 7, 1972, the day of that year's election. For its first ten years on the air, it broadcast on AM 1140. It reallocated to its present-day frequency of 1160 kilohertz in 1982.

The station's transmission tower collapsed during a windstorm in January 1976; it returned to the air the next day with a makeshift antenna.

In the 2010s, WKCM also broadcast on two FM translators: Hawesville, Kentucky (92.1 MHz) and Whitesville, Kentucky (97.9 MHz). Additionally, on August 1, 2018, WKCM began simulcasting with sister station WBIO, in addition to dropping the Nash Icon syndicated format from Westwood One, and broadcasting all music and programming locally.

== Former Logos ==
WKCM former logo

WKCM previous logo
