= WJKG =

- Altamont, Illinois; United States
- Broadcast area: Effingham, Illinois
- Frequency: 105.5 MHz
- Branding: 105.5 & 100.5 Jack FM

Programming
- Format: Adult hits

Ownership
- Owner: Cromwell Radio Group
- Sister stations: WCRA, WCRC, WHQQ

History
- First air date: 2013
- Call sign meaning: Jack

Technical information
- Licensing authority: FCC
- Facility ID: 191576
- Class: A
- ERP: 3,600 watts
- HAAT: 127 meters (417 ft)
- Transmitter coordinates: type:city 39°06′26.00″N 88°33′44.00″W
- Translator: 100.5 W263AQ (Effingham)

Links
- Public license information: Public file; LMS
- Webcast: Listen Live
- Website: www.effinghamradio.com/jack-fm/

WJKG, (105.5 FM), is a radio station licensed to Altamont, Illinois. WJKG has a format known as 105.5 & 100.5 Jack FM and is owned by the Cromwell Radio Group.
