= WRJM =

WRJM may refer to:

- WRJM (AM), a radio station (1290 AM) licensed to Greenfield, Wisconsin
- WRJM-LP, a low-power radio station (95.5 FM) licensed to Cullman, Alabama
- WEIC, a radio station (1270 AM) licensed to Charleston, Illinois, which held the call sign WRJM from 2012 to 2013
- WIYC, a television station (channel 48/PSIP 67) licensed to Troy, Alabama, which held the call sign WRJM-TV from 2000 to 2009
- WPHH, a radio station (93.7 FM) licensed to Hartford, Alabama, which held the call sign WRJM-FM from 1987 to 2008
- WZHT, a radio station (105.7 FM) licensed to Troy, Alabama, which held the call sign WRJM-FM from 1984 to 1987
- WADK, a radio station (1540 AM) licensed to Newport, Rhode Island, which held the call sign WRJM from 1948 to 1953
