= WWGO =

- Charleston, Illinois; United States
- Broadcast area: Charleston, Illinois; Mattoon, Illinois
- Frequency: 92.1 MHz (HD Radio)
- Branding: 92.1 the Axe

Programming
- Format: Classic rock
- Subchannels: HD2: Sports

Ownership
- Owner: Cromwell Radio Group; (The Cromwell Group, Inc. of Illinois)
- Sister stations: WMCI, WCBH

History
- First air date: October 1, 1965
- Former call signs: WEIC-FM (1965–1993); WHQQ (1993–1997)

Technical information
- Licensing authority: FCC
- Facility ID: 72317
- Class: A
- ERP: 6,000 watts
- HAAT: 100 meters (330 ft)
- Transmitter coordinates: 39°31′40″N 88°21′23″W
- Translator: HD2: 103.9 W280EK (Mattoon)

Links
- Public license information: Public file; LMS
- Webcast: Listen live; Listen live (HD2)
- Website: www.myradiolink.com/the-axe/; www.myradiolink.com/victory-103-9/ (HD2)

WWGO (92.1 FM) is a radio station broadcasting a Classic rock format. Licensed to Charleston, Illinois, the station is owned by Cromwell Radio Group, through licensee The Cromwell Group, Inc. of Illinois.

== History ==
The station began broadcasting October 1, 1965, and originally held the call sign WEIC-FM. The station was originally owned by Friendly Broadcasters, Inc. In 1967, the station was sold to Community Communications Associates, along with its AM sister station.

The station originally simulcast the MOR format of its sister station WEIC 1270, but in December 1971, the station adopted a progressive rock format, while its sister station adopted a top 40 format. By 1973, the station was simulcasting the top 40 programming of WEIC 1270 during the day, while airing country music from 6 p.m. to 10 p.m. and progressive rock 10 p.m. to 2 a.m. In the following years, the station would return to simulcasting AM sister station most of the time. The station was purchased by Withers Broadcasting in 1975. In 1980, the station was sold to Macomb Broadcasting Co., along with its AM sister station, for $700,000.

By 1984 the station was airing an adult contemporary format, separate from its AM sister station. In 1984, the station was sold to Steve Garman, along with its AM sister station, for $628,000. The station continued airing an adult contemporary format into the early 1990s.

In 1993, the station's call sign was changed to WHQQ, and the station adopted an oldies format, playing music from the late 1950s to the early 1970s. The station was sold to The Cromwell Group later that same year. In 1997, the station's call sign was changed to WWGO, and the station's format was changed from oldies to dance/CHR, branded "The Party", with the WHQQ call sign and its oldies format moving to 98.9. By 2002, the station was airing a rock format.
