= WCTZ =

WCTZ may refer to:

- WARW (FM), a radio station (96.7 FM) licensed to serve Port Chester, New York, United States, which held the call sign WCTZ from 2006 to 2011
- WQZQ, a radio station (830 AM) licensed to serve Goodlettsville, Tennessee, United States, which held the call sign WCTZ from 1988 to 2005
