= WBIO =

- Philpot, Kentucky; United States
- Broadcast area: Owensboro, Kentucky
- Frequency: 94.7 MHz
- Branding: Country Classics

Programming
- Format: Classic country

Ownership
- Owner: Cromwell Radio Group; (Hancock Communications, Inc.)
- Sister stations: WKCM, WLME, WTCJ, WCJZ, WVJS, WXCM

History
- First air date: November 18, 1993

Technical information
- Licensing authority: FCC
- Facility ID: 65577
- Class: A
- ERP: 3,000 watts
- HAAT: 100 meters (330 ft)
- Transmitter coordinates: 37°41′50″N 86°59′28″W
- Repeater: 1160 WKCM (Hawesville)

Links
- Public license information: Public file; LMS
- Webcast: Listen Live
- Website: WBIO Online

WBIO (94.7 FM, "True Country") is an American radio station licensed to serve the community of Philpot, Kentucky. The station is owned and operated by Hancock Communications, Inc., doing business as the Cromwell Radio Group.

WBIO broadcasts a classic country music radio format to the greater Owensboro, Kentucky, area.

WBIO is also the home radio station for Kentucky Wesleyan Panthers men's basketball, where Joel Utley, until his retirement in 2022, was the KWC basketball broadcaster for 61 years.

On August 1, 2018, WBIO began simulcasting with sister station WKCM & both stations rebranded as "Country Classics".
