= WKRV =

Coordinates: 38°59′48″N 88°55′44″W

- Vandalia, Illinois; United States
- Frequency: 107.1 MHz
- Branding: The Kurv 107.1

Programming
- Format: Classic hits
- Affiliations: ABC News Radio

Ownership
- Owner: Cromwell Radio Group; (The Cromwell Group, Inc. of Illinois)
- Sister stations: WPMB

History
- First air date: May 28, 1974
- Former call signs: WKRV-FM (1974–1980)
- Call sign meaning: "Kurv"

Technical information
- Licensing authority: FCC
- Facility ID: 42088
- Class: A
- ERP: 6,000 watts
- HAAT: 100 meters (330 ft)

Links
- Public license information: Public file; LMS
- Webcast: Listen live
- Website: vandaliaradio.com/the-wrkv-107-1-fm

WKRV (107.1 FM) is a radio station broadcasting a classic hits format. Licensed to Vandalia, Illinois, the station serves the Vandalia and Effingham areas.
