= WMCI =

WMCI may refer to:

- Walter Murray Collegiate Institute
- Wyoming Medium Correctional Institution
- WMCI (FM), a radio station (101.3 FM) licensed to serve Mattoon, Illinois, United States
