= WVJS =

Radio station in Owensboro, Kentucky

- Owensboro, Kentucky; United States
- Frequency: 1420 kHz
- Branding: WVJS AM 1420 & 92.9 FM

Programming
- Format: Oldies; classic hits

Ownership
- Owner: Cromwell Radio Group; (Hancock Communications, Inc.)
- Sister stations: WBIO; WKCM; WLME; WTCJ; WKCM-FM; WXCM

History
- First air date: November 27, 1947
- Call sign meaning: Initials of founder Vincent Joseph Steele

Technical information
- Licensing authority: FCC
- Facility ID: 51071
- Class: D
- Power: 980 watts day; 20 watts night
- Transmitter coordinates: 37°46′32″N 87°9′31″W
- Translators: 92.9 W225CL (Owensboro); 93.3 W227CO (Cannelton, Indiana)

Links
- Public license information: Public file; LMS
- Webcast: Listen live
- Website: www.owensbororadio.com/wvjs/

WVJS (1420 AM) is an American radio station licensed to serve the community of Owensboro, Kentucky. The station is owned and operated by Hancock Communications, Inc., doing business as the Cromwell Radio Group. The station airs an oldies/classic hits format.

WVJS operates with a power of 980 watts during the day, and 20 watts during the night. This makes it a class D radio station. The station also has two translators, 92.9 W225CL and 93.3 W227CO. These translators both operate at an effective radiated power (ERP) of 250 watts, making them class D translators.

== History ==
WVJS began a test broadcast on October 26, 1947. It went on the air officially on November 27, 1947, from studios located at 324 Allen Street in downtown Owensboro. The station's transmitter building and multi tower directional array were located on a 26-acre tract of land on U.S. Highway 60, just west of the Owensboro city limits. The station operated on 1420 kHz with 1,000 watts of power. The following year WVJS-FM went on the air on 96.1 MHz.

The stations were owned and operated by Owensboro on the Air, Incorporated. Owensboro developer Vincent J. Steele was majority owner. Owensboro radio veteran Malcolm Greep, who was a driving force in starting WVJS, was named general manager of the new station.

In early 1960, WVJS closed its downtown studios on Allen Street and consolidated all of its operations at the company's transmitting site on Highway 60. The station began play-by-play coverage of the Kentucky Wesleyan College basketball games in 1961. In 1962, WVJS was granted FCC approval to boost daytime power to 5,000 watts. In 1963, the station's FM callsign was changed to WSTO and it became Kentucky's first full-time stereo broadcasting station.

In 1973, Owensboro on the Air was granted a franchise by the city to provide cable television service to Owensboro and a new building to house Owensboro Cablevision was constructed at the company's Highway 60 site.

In 1983, V.J. Steele's heirs sold WVJS, WSTO and the cable TV operations to Century Communications Corporation of New Canaan, Connecticut. At the end of 1996, Century sold WVJS and WSTO to Brill Media which already owned Owensboro stations WOMI and WBKR. WSTO was later sold to South Central Communications of Evansville, Indiana.

In 2002, WVJS was purchased by its current owner, Cromwell Radio Group, and shares facilities at 1115 Tamarack Road in Owensboro, with the following stations: Philpot-licensed WBIO, Whitesville-licensed WXCM, Hawesville-licensed WKCM, Lewisport-licensed WLME, Cannelton, Indiana-licensed WCJZ and Tell City, Indiana-licensed WTCJ.

Former logo

== Programming ==
WVJS broadcasts a mix of oldies and classic hits music format to the greater Owensboro, Kentucky, area. Programming features the "Kool Gold" syndicated format from Westwood One.

General Managers from 1947 to 1997 included Malcolm Greep, Ray Wettstain, Corky Norcia, and Steve Cooke. The station's Commercial Managers from 1947 to 1997 included Jack McLean, John Rutledge, Parker Smith, Joe Fife, Dennis Keller, and Corky Norcia. Program Directors from 1947 to 1997 included Lee Meredith, Earl Fisher, Jim Orton, and Joe Lowe. Finally, News Directors from 1947 to 1997 included Joe Bell, Gerry Wood, Joel Utley, Jim Parr, Mike Whitsett, Scott Douglas, and Jerry Birge.

== Translators ==
WVJS programming is also carried on two broadcast translator stations to extend or improve the coverage area of the station.

Broadcast translators for WVJS
| Call sign | Frequency | City of license | FID | ERP (W) | Class | FCC info |
|---|---|---|---|---|---|---|
| W225CL | 92.9 FM | Owensboro, Kentucky | 147373 | 250 | D | LMS |
| W227CO | 93.3 FM | Cannelton, Indiana | 141261 | 250 | D | LMS |
