= WCRA =

Coordinates: 39°06′26″N 88°33′44″W

- Effingham, Illinois; United States
- Broadcast area: Effingham, Illinois
- Frequency: 1090 kHz
- Branding: WCRA Talk - AM 1090

Programming
- Format: News Talk
- Affiliations: Compass Media Networks; Premiere Networks; Salem Radio Network; Townhall News; Westwood One

Ownership
- Owner: Cromwell Radio Group; (The Cromwell Group, Inc. of Illinois)
- Sister stations: WCRC, WHQQ, WJKG

History
- First air date: June 8, 1947

Technical information
- Licensing authority: FCC
- Facility ID: 19047
- Class: D
- Power: 640 watts day 11 watts night
- Translators: 99.5 W258CQ (Neoga); 107.7 W299CO (Effingham)

Links
- Public license information: Public file; LMS
- Webcast: Listen Live
- Website: effinghamradio.com

WCRA (1090 AM) is a radio station broadcasting a news talk format. Licensed to Effingham, Illinois, United States, the station is currently owned by Cromwell Radio Group, through licensee The Cromwell Group, Inc. of Illinois. WCRA carries a variety of talk shows such as Rush Limbaugh, Sean Hannity, and Dave Ramsey.

== History ==
WCRA began broadcasting June 8, 1947, and ran 250 watts during daytime hours only. The station's power was increased to 1,000 watts in 1966.

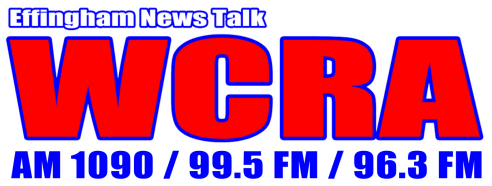
Logo while on the 96.3 translator
