= WEJT =

Coordinates: 39°35′38″N 88°50′45″W

- Shelbyville, Illinois; United States
- Broadcast area: Decatur, Illinois; Taylorville, Illinois; Mattoon, Illinois
- Frequency: 105.1 MHz
- Branding: 105.1 Jack FM

Programming
- Format: Variety hits

Ownership
- Owner: The Cromwell Radio Group, Inc. of Illinois
- Sister stations: WYDS, WZNX, WZUS

History
- First air date: 1969 (as WSHY-FM)
- Former call signs: WSHY-FM (1969–1989)

Technical information
- Licensing authority: FCC
- Facility ID: 65570
- Class: B1
- ERP: 13,000 watts
- HAAT: 142 meters (466 ft)
- Translator: 105.9 W290CL (Decatur)

Links
- Public license information: Public file; LMS
- Webcast: Listen Live
- Website: decaturjack.com

WEJT 105.1 FM is a radio station broadcasting a variety hits format, branded as Jack FM. Licensed to Shelbyville, Illinois, the station serves the Decatur, Illinois area, as well as the areas of Taylorville, Illinois and Mattoon, Illinois, and is owned by The Cromwell Group, Inc. of Illinois.
