= 1949 St. Anthony's Hospital fire =

1949 fire in Effingham, Illinois, USA

Coordinates: 39°7′32.3″N 88°33′2.5″W

- Date: April 4, 1949
- Time: Shortly before Midnight
- Location: Effingham, Illinois, U.S.
- Deaths: 74 dead

St. Anthony's Hospital fire was a disaster that occurred on April 4, 1949 in Effingham, Illinois. The disaster killed 74 people at the hospital. It is used as a prime example of possible fire hazards hospitals could and can have. St. Anthony's Hospital in Effingham, Illinois, was operated by the Sisters of St. Francis, who lived in a convent next door.

== Building ==
The about 100-bed hospital was constructed mainly out of wood and brick. Parts of the building dated back to 1876. By 1949 the facility was completely outdated. It contained open corridors and staircases. Many walls and ceilings were covered with oilcloth fabrics and combustible soundproof tiles. The building lacked sprinklers as well as fire detection and alarm systems.

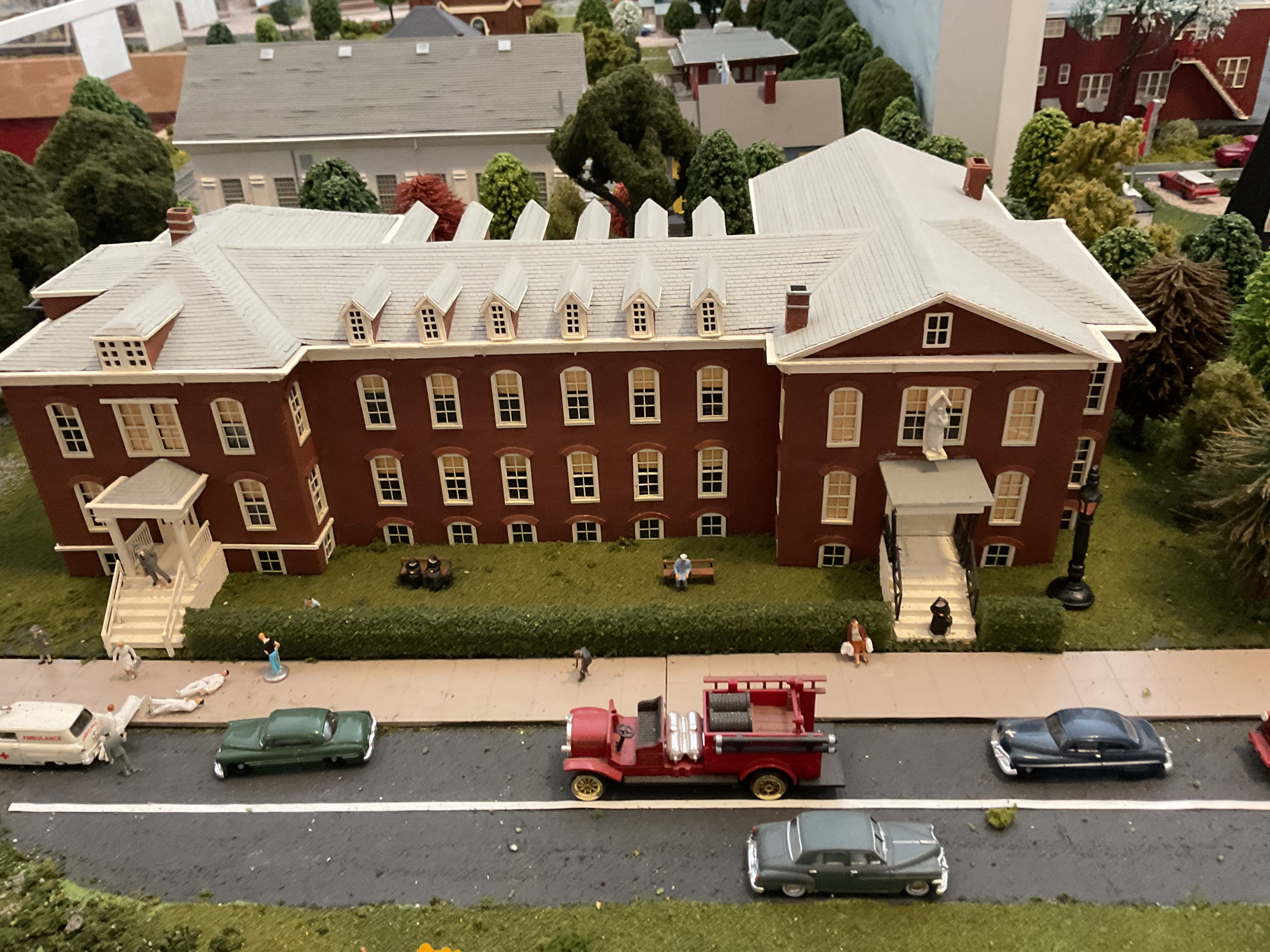
Model of first St. Anthony Hospital in Gallery 5

A detailed scale model of the first St. Anthony Hospital is on display in Gallery 5 on the first level of the Effingham County Museum, 110 East Jefferson, Effingham, Illinois. The model was constructed by Museum volunteer Jo Thomas. It is positioned along a working model train route that contains many other historic structures from Effingham County history. The Effingham County Museum has other fire-related artifacts and photographs. It is open from 10:00 AM to 2:00 PM on Tuesdays and Saturdays from March through late December, and otherwise by appointment. Scheduled individual and tour group visits are welcomed. The Museum's mailing address is ECCCMA, Box 324, Effingham, IL 62401.

== Fire ==
Shortly before midnight on April 4, 1949, a fire broke out at St. Anthony's Hospital. It spread rapidly through the building because of the open construction of the building and the combustible building materials. One of the victims, Frank Ries, was alerted about the fire shortly after it was detected after a hospital switchboard operator, Sister Anastasia Groesch, telephoned him to the hospital. He was called prior to the fire department and attempted to extinguish the fire by spraying a fire extinguisher down the laundry chute on each floor. The fire had been reported to Sister Groesch by Sister Mary Edmunda Hiersig, who reported that she smelled smoke in the first floor around 11:30 pm as she was going off duty.

There were 116 patients and ten staff on duty when the fire started. Many of them were trapped on the upper floors by the rapid spread of the fire. These included eleven newborn infants in the nursery and the nurse who stayed behind with them. Many who were on the first floor were able to either walk out or escape via low windows; however, many who jumped to escape from the fire from the second or third floors had long lasting injuries. Others were rescued by doctors and nurses who returned into the building multiple times until they were overcome by the fire or their injuries and unable to return into the building.

The twenty-six men and three pumpers of the Effingham Volunteer Fire Department were under prepared for the rapidly spreading fire, that had already burned through the building roof within ten minutes of the fires being detected and the department arriving. The department was small and only had three pumping engines and no ladder trucks or other equipment to rescue patients trapped on the second or third floors. Eleven mutual aid departments also responded.

== Victims ==
A total of 74 people died, including patients, nurses, nuns, a priest and Frank Ries, the hospital engineer who ran into the flames to try to rescue his wife. A historian for the Effingham County Museum stated that about 88% of the victims were either female or under the age of 12 years-old.

== Aftermath ==
The Red Cross set up an inquiry bureau in the town to help victims and survivors family and friends identify and locate them. Blood plasma, blankets and other medical and relief supplies were also donated to victims by the Red Cross.

Funds were raised to build a new hospital, through a letter campaign which sent about 293,500 letters that referenced the death of Nurse Fern Riley. Within two weeks the campaign raised $300,000 and ended with a total of $563,000 by the end of the summer.

The cause of the fire remains unknown. However, investigators quickly identified the many safety deficiencies at St. Anthony's Hospital. In response to the fire, Governor Adlai Stevenson ordered the evaluation of all the hospitals in the state to identify and mitigate fire hazards. The impact of the fire went beyond Illinois as hospitals across the United States made many of the fire protection improvements that are standard today.

== Commemoration ==
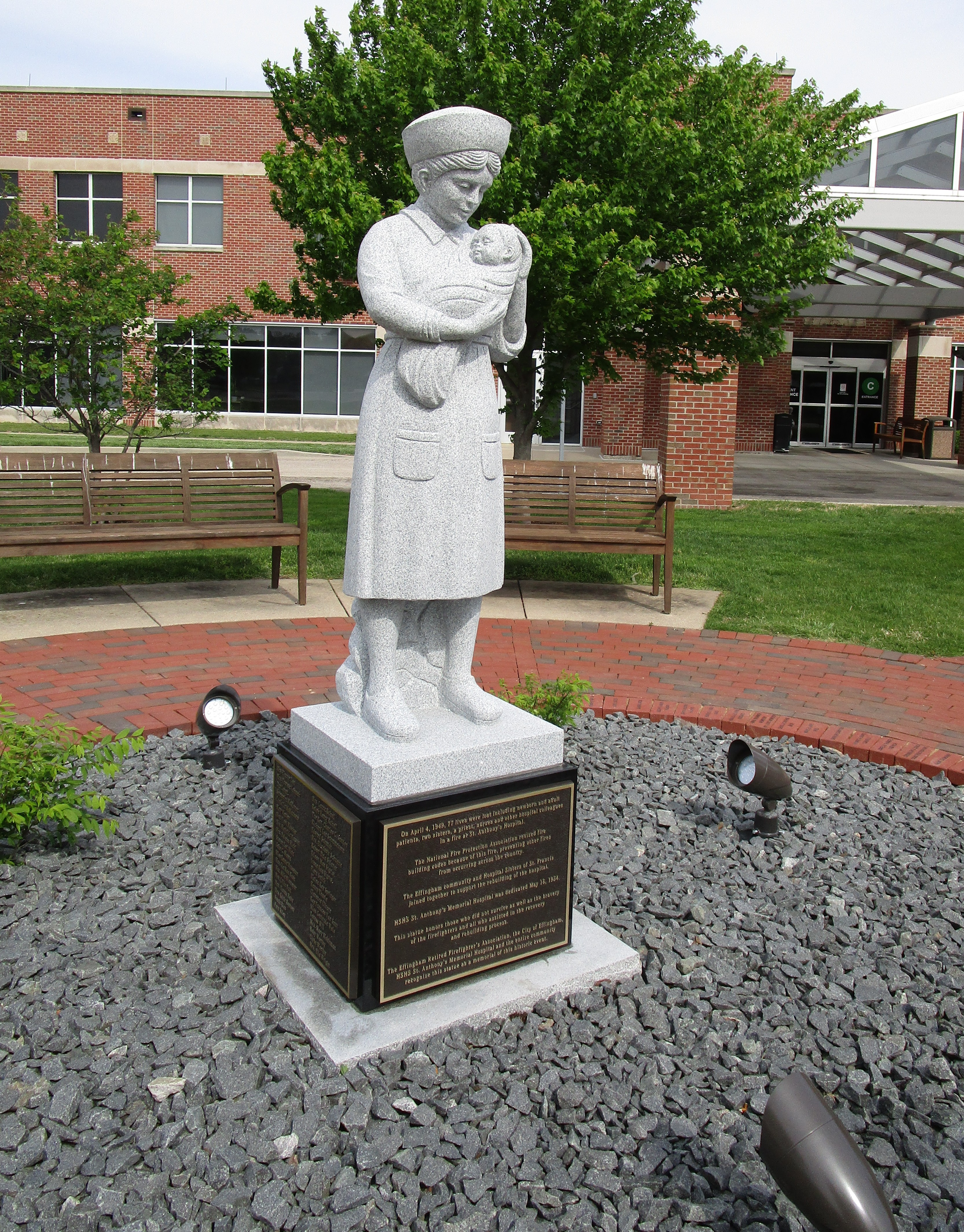
Nurse Statue Commemorating St. Anthony Hospital Fire

Year 2024 was the 75th anniversary of the fire. The Effingham Retired Volunteer Firefighters' Association collaborated with the administration of the new hospital and the City of Effingham to create and place a permanent memorial on the grounds. There were multiple purposes for the memorial, namely: (1) to create a wider awareness of the fire and its aftermath, (2) to honor those who died, (3) to honor those who lost someone in the fire, (4) to remember and honor those who fought the fire, and (5) to remember and give thanks to those who helped in any way during its aftermath. The statue was based on a drawing by a local artist, Jamie Stang Ellis.

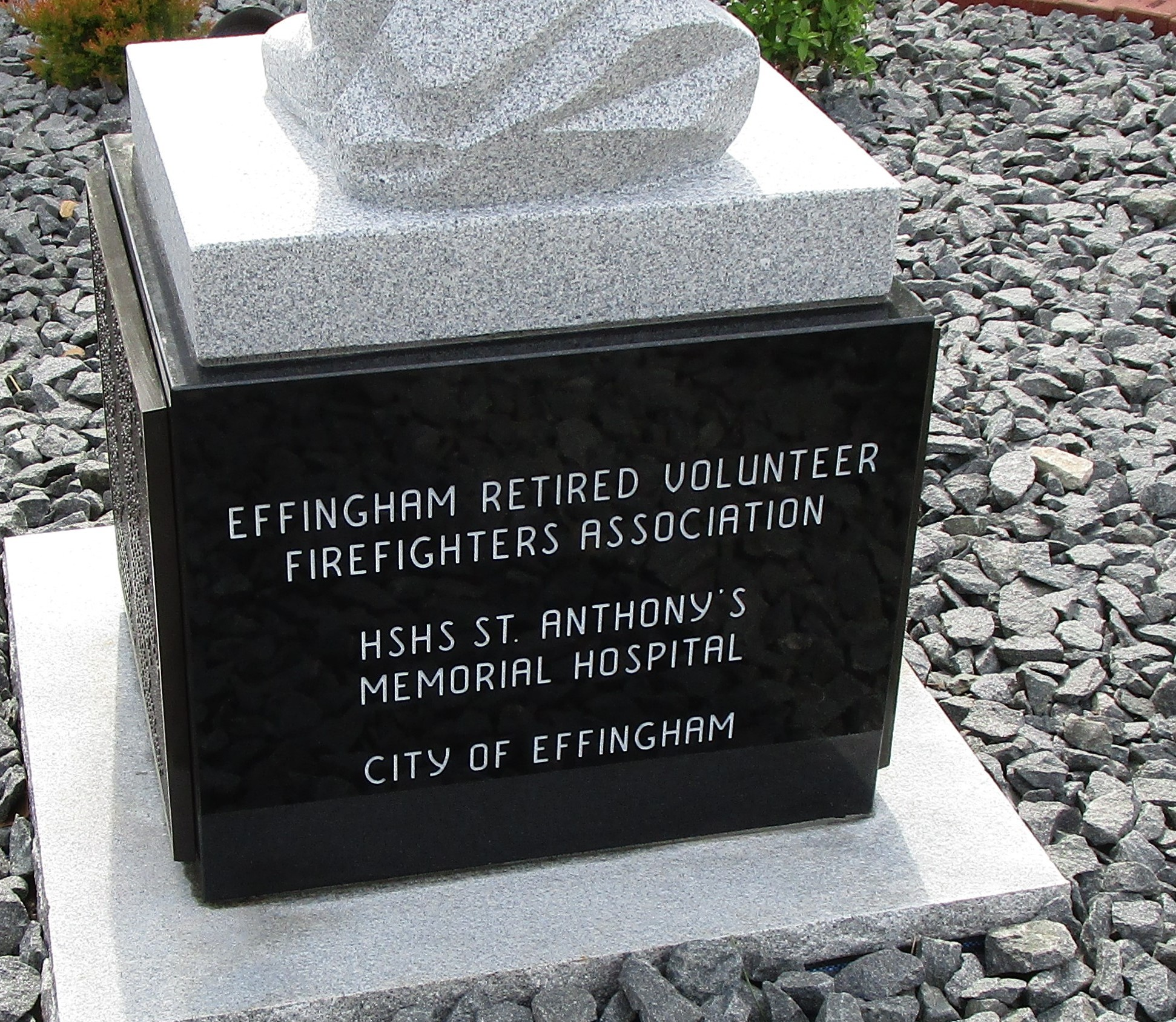
Base of statue with names of collaborators

The unveiling of the statue took place on April 14, 2024. There was a brief ceremony. After a moment of silence, a color guard presented the colors. The color guard was made up of the Effingham American Legion Post 120, the Effingham VFW Post 1769, and the Effingham DAV Chapter 7. Speakers included the HSHS St. Anthony's Memorial President and CEO, Mayor Mike Schutzbach, and Retired Volunteer Firefighters Nick Althoff and Jim Wolters. The hospital chaplain blessed the statue before it was unveiled. The statue is of a nurse in a traditional 1940s uniform and cap. She is holding an infant wrapped in a blanket. It stands near the hospital's Prairie Cardiovascular entrance.
