= WKCM-FM =

- Cannelton, Indiana; United States
- Broadcast area: Owensboro, Kentucky
- Frequency: 105.7 MHz
- Branding: 105.7 The Bridge

Programming
- Format: Contemporary Christian music
- Affiliations: Westwood One, Fox News Radio

Ownership
- Owner: Cromwell Radio Group; (Hancock Communications, Inc.)
- Sister stations: WBIO, WKCM, WLME, WTCJ, WVJS, WXCM

History
- First air date: 2000
- Former call signs: WTCJ-FM (2000–2013); WCJZ (2013–2026)

Technical information
- Licensing authority: FCC
- Facility ID: 83101
- Class: A
- ERP: 2,000 watts
- HAAT: 178 meters (584 ft)
- Transmitter coordinates: 37°47′44″N 86°50′58″W

Links
- Public license information: Public file; LMS
- Webcast: Listen live
- Website: owensbororadio.com/thebridge/

WKCM-FM (105.7 FM, "105.7 The Bridge") is a radio station licensed to serve the community of Cannelton, Indiana, United States. The station is owned and operated by the Cromwell Radio Group and broadcasts a contemporary Christian music format to the greater Owensboro, Kentucky, area.

== Previous logos ==
(Station logo under WTCJ-FM's previous classic hits format)
