= WZNX =

- Sullivan, Illinois; United States
- Broadcast area: Decatur, Illinois
- Frequency: 106.7 MHz (HD Radio)
- Branding: 106.7 The Fox

Programming
- Format: Mainstream rock
- Subchannels: HD2: ? HD3: 106.3 The Game (Sports)
- Affiliations: Compass Media Networks

Ownership
- Owner: Cromwell Radio Group; (The Cromwell Group, Inc. of Illinois)
- Sister stations: WEJT, WYDS, WZUS

History
- First air date: 1992 (as WKJR)
- Former call signs: WKJR (1990–1994); DWKJR (1994–1997)

Technical information
- Licensing authority: FCC
- Facility ID: 57461
- Class: B1
- ERP: 9,500 watts
- HAAT: 161 meters (528 ft)
- Transmitter coordinates: 39°36′39.00″N 88°41′32.00″W
- Translators: HD3: 106.3 W292DW (Mattoon); HD3: 106.3 W292EO (Decatur)

Links
- Public license information: Public file; LMS
- Webcast: Listen Live; Listen Live (HD3)
- Website: 1067thefox.com 1063thegame.com (HD3)

WZNX (106.7 FM) is a mainstream rock radio station. It is licensed in Sullivan, Illinois, and is owned by the Cromwell Radio Group, through licensee The Cromwell Group, Inc. of Illinois.

== History ==
WZNX calls itself The Fox, a reference to the X in its call letters, and the F in the call letters of its onetime sister-station, WZNF (95.3 FM) licensed out of Rantoul, Illinois. The Cromwell Radio Group bought the radio station in the mid-1990s, kept the call letters and the "Fox" identifier. Among the disc jockeys during this time were Chris Anderson, Brian Rickman, Lars Christiansen and Wes Adams. Current disc jockeys include Scott Lithgow and Storm . During the stations highest Arbitron ratings the Gonzo Morning Show was on the air. Hosted by Brad Wheeling, "Rockin Rod" Hall and Chris "Monkey Boy" Knyght. The trio was split by corporate buy out and satellite moved in, bringing Bob and Tom, and WZNX has been a Bob and Tom Show affiliate from the late 1990s, until late 2013, when Bob and Tom was replaced with The Free Beer and Hot Wings Show.

== Previous logo ==
(WZNX-HD3 logo under previous "Buzz" active rock format)
