= George J. Bauer =

American politician

George John Bauer (November 23, 1871 – July 26, 1942) was an American politician.

Bauer was born in Burlington, Iowa. In 1892, he moved to Effingham, Illinois. He served as the Effingham city treasurer and helped start the Effingham fire department. Bauer served in the Illinois House of Representatives from 1927 to 1931 and from 1937 until his death in 1942. Bauer was a Democrat. Bauer died suddenly from a heart attack in Effingham while sitting on the front lawn of his home.
