= WEIC =

DWEIC
- Charleston, Illinois; United States
- Broadcast area: Charleston/Mattoon, Illinois
- Frequency: 1270 kHz

Programming
- Language: English
- Format: Defunct
- Affiliations: CBS Radio News, Chicago Cubs Radio Network

Ownership
- Owner: Miller Media Group; (Kaskaskia Broadcasting, Inc.)

History
- First air date: December 12, 1954
- Last air date: January 1, 2014
- Former call signs: WEIC (1954-January 4, 2012); WRJM (January 4, 2012-November 29, 2013)

Technical information
- Facility ID: 12485
- Class: B
- Power: 1,000 watts day 500 watts night
- Transmitter coordinates: 39°30′18″N 88°12′54″W
- Translator: W241BU/96.1 MHz

WEIC (1270 AM) was a radio station licensed to Charleston, Illinois, United States.

== History ==
The station signed on for the first time December 12, 1954 as WEIC, built by Charleston resident Jack Owens, who took a disability settlement from an injury suffered while working for the railroad, and used it to build the radio station. The station signed on with 1,000 watts of power on 1270 kHz operating during daytime hours only, from studios, transmitter and towers located at the same place they were when the station ceased operations—2560 West State Street (on what was formerly Illinois Route 16, now Illinois Route 316) on Charleston's northwest side.

The station was owned by Friendly City Broadcasters, which was a partnership of Jack Owens and Betty Jane Owens. Owens' family was involved in the operation of the station as well. Owens owned the station thru the 1960s, and they also began the work to file an application with the Federal Communications Commission to add nighttime service with 500 watts and 3 additional towers.

WEIC-FM 92.1 signed on the air on October 1, 1965, providing the first FM radio station in Charleston. In 1967, the station was sold to Community Communications Associates, along with its FM sister station.

In December 1971, the station dropped the MOR format that it had been airing in favor a top 40 format. The station was extremely popular with the students at Eastern Illinois University, also located in Charleston.

In 1972, under the ownership of John Hurlbut and Rusty Russell who was also the general manager at the time, WEIC finally received authority to transmit on 1270 full-time.

WEIC was purchased by Withers Broadcasting in 1975. By 1979 the station was again airing a MOR format. In 1980, the station was sold to Macomb Broadcasting Co., along with its FM sister station, for $700,000. By 1984, the station was airing a country music format. In 1984, the station was sold to Steve Garman, along with its FM sister station, for $628,000. The station would continue airing a country music format until March 1992, when the station adopted a talk radio format. WEIC-FM was sold to the Cromwell Group, Inc., which owns stations in Mattoon and Effingham, Illinois, in 1993.

The station was purchased by Gary Lee in early January 1995. Under Lee's ownership, WEIC began a Southern Gospel music format, which was heard on 1270 from November 26, 1994 until October 7, 2011. While airing the Southern Gospel format, it was a reporting station to the Singing News magazine's top 80 chart. Lee died in 2003, and his son Brad inherited the station and operated it until he sold the station to the Miller Media Group's Kaskaskia Broadcasting, Inc. of Taylorville, Illinois, on October 7, 2011. Miller immediately took the station off the air to re-tool and re-program for its new News-Talk and agriculture format which premiered October 19, 2011.

Miller changed the call letters of the station to WRJM at the FCC on January 4, 2012; the call letters officially were changed on the air on February 1, 2012.

The News-talk format featured a live and local morning show with expanded local newscasts and 3 local interview shows each day. Hourly local news updates aired 24/7 at 30 minutes past each hour. WRJM featured over 6 hours a day of agriculture programming, including programming from the RFD Radio Network, and the AgriTalk Radio Network.

Sunday's programming line-up on WRJM included the long-running Gospel Sing Time with Brad Lee from 7 to 11am.

WRJM's logo from 2011 to 2013

WRJM programming was also heard on a new FM repeater covering Coles County and surrounding area at 107.1 FM, which went on the air December 5, 2011. The repeater moved to 96.1 FM as W241BU on July 24, 2013.

WRJM local programming was also streamed on-line on its web site, WRJMdailynews.com since February 1, 2012. The station began streaming on October 22, 2012, and available on smartphones through tunein.com, as of October 26, 2012.

WRJM obtained the rights to Chicago Cubs baseball on April 9, 2012 and aired games in the 2012 and 2013 season. WRJM was the flagship station for Eastern Illinois Panthers football, in 2012 and 2013.

Charleston High School sports broadcasts moved from Eastern Illinois University's WEIU to WRJM on September 28, 2012. The NCAA, which regulates college athletics, issued a rule in August 2012, that high school sports could not be broadcast on a college station for fear the broadcasts would unduly influence recruiting at that university. WRJM broadcast the remainder of the 2012 Charleston High School football season, as well as all boys' and girls' basketball games, and a "Game of the Week" featuring Charleston baseball and softball.

WEIC celebrated its 57th anniversary on the air with a four and a half hour interview show on Saturday, December 10, 2011.

WEIC ceased operations at 12:01 a.m. January 1, 2014. The studio location was sold and turned into farmland. WEIC's FM repeater at 96.1 was sold to Bud Walters, owner of the Cromwell Group of radio stations in Mattoon.

== Translator ==
Broadcast translator for WEIC
Call sign	Frequency	City of license	FID	ERP (W)	HAAT	Class	Transmitter coordinates	FCC info	Notes
W241BU	96.1 FM	Charleston, Illinois	146836	250	122 m (400 ft)	D	39°23′16″N 88°17′20″W	LMS	To be sold upon the closure of WEIC.
