= WMCI (FM) =

Coordinates: 39°15′1.3″N 88°22′46.6″W

- Mattoon, Illinois; United States
- Broadcast area: Mattoon, Illinois - Charleston, Illinois - Effingham, Illinois
- Frequency: 101.3 MHz (HD Radio)
- Branding: WMCI 101.3

Programming
- Format: Country music
- Subchannels: HD2: Classic rock "96.3 Classic Rock"

Ownership
- Owner: The Cromwell Group, Inc. of Illinois
- Sister stations: WWGO, WCBH

Technical information
- Licensing authority: FCC
- Facility ID: 70348
- Class: B1
- ERP: 11,000 watts
- HAAT: 150 meters (490 ft)
- Translators: 96.5 W243AM (Mattoon); 96.3 W242CK (Effingham, relays HD2)

Links
- Public license information: Public file; LMS
- Webcast: www.myradiolink.com/player/?playerID=582
- Website: www.myradiolink.com/wmci/

WMCI (101.3 MHz) is an FM radio station broadcasting a country music format. Licensed to Mattoon, Illinois, the station serves the Mattoon, Charleston, and Effingham areas. The station is owned by The Cromwell Radio Group, Inc. of Illinois.

== Translators ==
WMCI programming is also carried on a broadcast translator station to extend or improve the coverage area of the station.

Call sign	Frequency	City of license	FID	ERP (W)	Class	FCC info
W243AM	96.5 FM	Mattoon, Illinois	146845	140	D	LMS

Broadcast translator for WMCI-HD2
Call sign	Frequency	City of license	FID	ERP (W)	Class	FCC info
W242CK	96.3 FM	Effingham, Illinois	138453	250	D	LMS
