= WYDS =

Radio station in Decatur, Illinois

Coordinates: 39.786°N 88.991°W

- Decatur, Illinois; United States
- Frequency: 93.1 MHz (HD Radio)
- Branding: 93.1 The Party

Programming
- Format: Contemporary hit radio
- Subchannels: HD2: Magic 95.5 (Urban adult contemporary); HD3: Griz FM (Classic Country); HD4: The Game (Sports)

Ownership
- Owner: Cromwell Radio Group; (The Cromwell Group, Inc. of Illinois)
- Sister stations: WEJT, WZNX, WZUS

History
- First air date: 1991

Technical information
- Licensing authority: FCC
- Facility ID: 71440
- Class: A
- ERP: 4,600 watts
- HAAT: 112 meters (367 ft)
- Translators: HD2: 95.5 W238CH (Decatur); HD3: 98.1 W251BN (Decatur); HD4: 93.5 W228CK (Decatur)

Links
- Public license information: Public file; LMS
- Webcast: Listen Live; Listen Live (HD2)
- Website: decaturradio.com

WYDS (93.1 FM) is a Top 40/CHR-formatted station licensed in Decatur, Illinois, and is currently known on-air as "93.1 The Party." The station can be heard into Springfield, Illinois. Its main competitor is WSOY-FM, which also has a Top 40/CHR format.

Uniquely, the station has used all three available HD Radio subchannels to air different programming: HD2 as urban adult contemporary, HD3 as classic country, and HD4 as sports talk. The station owners apportioned translators to ensure that to the greatest extent possible, the population targeted and station coverage matched. HD radio supporters argue that this allows the owners to maximize revenue, by allowing all demographics to be targeted, not just those who would be listening to the original signal.
