= Mary Ann Brown Newcomb =

Nurse for Union Army during American Civil War (1817-1892)

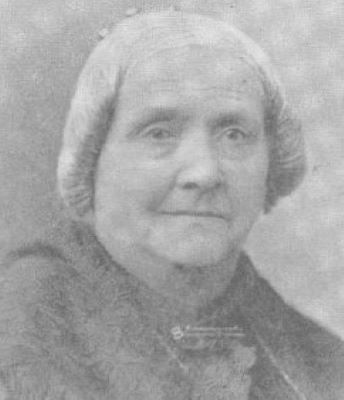
Mary Ann Brown Newcomb, Civil War nurse for the Union Army

Mary Ann Brown Newcomb, also known as Mary A. Newcomb (January 5, 1817 – December 23, 1892), (Note: The American National Biography states that she died on December 22, 1892, but her obituary and gravestone state she died on December 23, 1892.) was a camp and hospital nurse who served the Union Army during the American Civil War. She wrote the book Four Years of Work and Personal Experience in the War. When the war broke out her husband and son enlisted in the Union Army. Newcomb paid for her way to Fort Donelson following the Battle of Fort Donelson (1862). She found that both men had been wounded and she cared for them.

As I walked over that battlefield in search of loved ones, and saw the terrible work that war had made and thought of the wave of woe that was surging over the land, I felt to say in my heart Oh God how long must we suffer?

— Mary Ann Brown Newcomb, marker at Dover in Stewart County, Tennessee to All That Served 1861–1865

She had no experience caring for wounded soldiers, but like other Civil War nurses, Newcomb relinquished her everyday responsibilities to serve as a hard-working nurse. Her husband, First Sergeant Hiram A.W. Newcomb (born July 25, 1811) was wounded on February 15, 1862, and died eleven days later.

She provided care for her son, who healed and returned to active service, and her severely wounded husband who wished that she care for "the boys" with the 11th Illinois Infantry Regiment. She ignored the chief surgeons command for lights out at 9:00 p.m., and she provided necessary care for the soldiers. This was partly because she was a volunteer nurse, and did not report up the military chain-of-command. When no doctor was available, she amputated a finger, which was unusual among nurses.

Mary Ann Brown was born on January 5, 1817, in Cayuga County, New York, the daughter of Mary Lockwood and Russell Brown. She died at her home in Effingham, Illinois on December 23, 1892. She is buried at Oakridge Cemetery in Effingham, Illinois.
