= WPRT-FM =

Coordinates: 36.293°N 87.306°W

- Pegram, Tennessee; United States
- Broadcast area: Nashville, Tennessee
- Frequency: 102.5 MHz (HD Radio)
- Branding: 102.5 & 106.3 The Game, ESPN Nashville

Programming
- Format: Sports
- Subchannels: HD2: "102.1 The Ville" (Urban oldies); HD3: Simulcast of WAYM (WayFM Network); HD4: "Totally Hits Nashville" (Classic hits)
- Affiliations: ESPN Radio; Middle Tennessee Blue Raiders football; Nashville Predators

Ownership
- Owner: Cromwell Radio Group; (WYCQ, Inc.)
- Sister stations: WBUZ; WQZQ

History
- First air date: September 10, 1984 (as WDKN-FM)
- Former call signs: WTNQ (ca. 1974–1984); WDKN-FM (1984–1987); WQZQ-FM (1987–2005); WVNS-FM (2005–2008)
- Call sign meaning: "Party" (previous format/branding)

Technical information
- Licensing authority: FCC
- Facility ID: 43630
- Class: C1
- ERP: 100,000 watts
- HAAT: 297 meters (974 ft)
- Translators: 106.3 W292ED (Franklin, relays WBUZ-HD2); HD2: 101.9 W270BK (Nashville); HD2: 102.1 W271AB (Nashville); HD4: 93.3 W227DC (Nashville)
- Repeater: 102.9 WBUZ-HD2 (La Vergne)

Links
- Public license information: Public file; LMS
- Webcast: Listen live; HD2: Listen live; HD4: Listen live
- Website: www.thegamenashville.com; HD2: www.1021theville.com; HD4: totallyhitsnashville.com

WPRT-FM (102.5 MHz "102.5 The Game") is an ESPN Radio-affiliated sports radio station. It is licensed to the city of Pegram, Tennessee, but serves the Nashville and Clarksville/Hopkinsville markets. The station's studios are located in southeast Nashville along the Murfreesboro Road (U.S. 41/70S), and the transmitter is located between Clarksville and Dickson in the unincorporated community of Cumberland Furnace.

WPRT-FM is owned by the Cromwell Radio Group. It is jointly operated and marketed with WBUZ "102.9 The Buzz", with which it shares ownership management and a sales staff. WPRT-FM broadcasts in the HD radio format.

== Station history ==
=== WPRT callsign history ===
Originally, WPRT-FM was the call sign for the now-defunct 105.5 FM in Prestonsburg, Kentucky, and was the sister station to WPRT (960 AM) in Prestonsburg. Today while WPRT still exists, its former sister station moved to 105.3 FM, now uses the call sign WXKZ, is owned by Gearheart Communications in Harold, Kentucky, and broadcasts an oldies format.

=== Early years ===
The station began its life as WDKN-FM, the FM sister station to WDKN (1260 AM) in Dickson, Tennessee, to which it was licensed and where it simulcast that small-town station's community-oriented format. When the station began to involve the Nashville market, its transmitter was moved to Bellsburg, Tennessee, on the Dickson County-Cheatham County line and hence closer to Nashville. Later, the callsign was changed to WQZQ-FM. For several years before 1996, the station broadcast a satellite-based classic rock format under the moniker “Q102”. From 1996 to 2005, the station broadcast a Top 40 format called “102.5 The Party”.

In 2005, when the station was relaunched as “Venus 102-5 FM”, it had to make a special request to obtain the call sign WVNS-FM. Per Federal Communications Commission regulations, they were required permission from WVNS-TV in Bluefield/Beckley, West Virginia, which they received. The "Venus" moniker, however, lasted less than a year before changing to "V102-5". On weekdays, V102-5 ran a live, local hot adult contemporary format. However, on weekends, the station ran programming from Jones Radio Network.

=== Stunt formats (August 2008) ===
On Tuesday, August 26, 2008, WVNS-FM began stunting with teaser formats devoting to just one recording artist, starting with "102.5 Frank FM. All Frank, All the Time" playing nothing but songs featuring Frank Sinatra. Then on August 27, it went from an all-Sinatra format to an all-Led Zeppelin format, featuring music from the British rock group. This was followed on an all-Garth Brooks format on August 28, then finally on August 29, the format was changed to television theme songs, which lasted until 12 noon (CDT). The last song played was the appropriately titled "Welcome Back" by John Sebastian.

=== Return to Top 40 (2008–2011) ===
At noon on August 29, 2008, the station brought back the rhythmic-leaning CHR format to the Nashville airwaves, launching with Nelly's "Party People". Kidd Kraddick's syndicated program Kidd Kraddick In The Morning was featured in the morning drive until March 2010. The station changed its call letters to WPRT-FM to match the "Party" handle.

In 2009, WPRT-FM began to add more rhythmic pop titles to its playlist, and by June shifted directions to rhythmic top 40, thus resulting in Mediabase and Nielsen BDS moving the station to their respective rhythmic reporting panels the following July, even though non-rhythmic flavored pop artists like Taylor Swift were still also played, a trend that other rhythmics on the panel (like KLUC-FM in Las Vegas and WJFX in Fort Wayne) were also doing due to a changing taste among listeners. Because of its rhythmic direction, WPRT-FM now took on urban contemporary rival WUBT and mainstream top 40 rivals WRVW and WNFN.

On May 24, 2011, WPRT-FM changed its format to hot AC, while retraining the "102.5 The Party" branding.

=== Conversion to sports ===
On August 15, 2011, it was confirmed that WPRT-FM would switch to a sports format. Adopting the new moniker “102.5 The Game”, the format change took effect on Monday, August 29, 2011, at 6 AM, following a weekend of stunting of construction sounds, Nashville Predators highlights, and a loop for several hours of the closing chorus of "The Party's Over" by Journey. The station took over flagship status for the Predators after a one-year stint on sister-station WBUZ "102.9 The Buzz". Upon its format change, the station announced it would become a primary affiliate of ESPN Radio six weeks after launch. This delay was due to ESPN Radio exercising an eight-week exit clause (executed two weeks prior to launch) in the contract with secondary affiliate WGFX. Upon assumption of the affiliation, WPRT-FM began to carry various ESPN Radio programming including The Herd with Colin Cowherd, SVP & Russillo, and SportsCenter Nightly.

In 2012, WPRT-FM became the new flagship for the Pacific Coast League's Nashville Sounds. On July 23 of that year, longtime Nashville sports radio personality George Plaster returned to the Nashville airwaves with the revival of his long-running afternoon drive-time talk show, SportsNight, leaving in August 2016 to become associate Athletic Director at Belmont University.

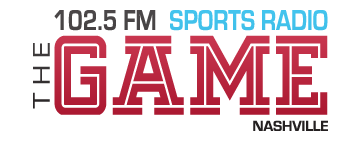
Logo before 106.3 translator sign on

To improve its coverage in the eastern portion of the Nashville market, the station was simulcast over W271AB, a translator located in La Vergne, Tennessee. The simulcast ended on February 5, 2013, when W271AB switched to a simulcast of WPRT-FM-HD2, with a gospel format, branded as "The Light". In May 2017, following a stunt loop for several days of "Macarena" by Los Del Rio, the HD2 sub-channel and translator changed their format to urban oldies, branded as "102.1 The Ville". This format would shift to urban adult contemporary in January 2023, coinciding with their addition of the Rickey Smiley Morning Show. The station would later on shift back to an urban oldies format, featuring a mix of R&B from the 70s to 2010s.

WPRT-FM formerly served as the flagship station for the nationally syndicated talk show, The Dave Ramsey Show, hosted by Dave Ramsey. The Dave Ramsey Show previously aired on 99.7 WWTN for more than 20 years before moving to WPRT-FM in January 2013. Both Dave Ramsey and WPRT-FM management quickly realized that his show would be more format-appropriate on a talk station than on a sports station. Both parties mutually agreed to end their broadcast relationship at the end of the year. The final airing of The Dave Ramsey Show on WPRT-FM occurred on December 31, 2013. The Dave Ramsey Show moved to WLAC the next day, January 1, 2014.

WPRT-FM has served as the flagship station for the Middle Tennessee Blue Raiders since the 2013 college football season.

On January 1, 2014, W235BW, a new translator at 94.9 MHz, was launched as “94.9 Game 2” (simulcasting programming from WQZQ). It served as an overflow outlet for "102.5 The Game" programming, as well as the local Fox Sports Radio affiliate and the home of Lipscomb University Bisons men's basketball. On June 13, 2022, the station was relaunched as “94.9 The Fan”, retaining the sports-talk format while establishing a station identity separate from "The Game" branding.

On March 5, 2014, WPRT-FM's transmitter site was struck by lightning during a severe thunderstorm in the area and therefore was reduced to limited power. The transmitter site was fully restored and the station returned to broadcasting at full power on June 2, 2014. In 2016, the station launched an additional translator, W210CD, which is licensed in Hendersonville, Tennessee, broadcasting on 89.9 MHz.

== See also ==
- List of Nashville media
