= WTCJ =

- Tell City, Indiana; United States
- Frequency: 1230 kHz
- Branding: 98.7 & 106.7 Jack FM

Programming
- Language: English
- Format: Adult hits
- Affiliations: Jack FM network

Ownership
- Owner: Cromwell Radio Group; (Hancock Communications, Inc.)
- Sister stations: WBIO; WKCM; WLME; WCJZ; WVJS; WXCM

History
- First air date: 1948

Technical information
- Licensing authority: FCC
- Facility ID: 18277
- Class: C
- Power: 850 watts
- Transmitter coordinates: 37°55′33″N 86°43′19″W
- Translators: 98.7 W254CC (Owensboro); 106.7 W294CG (Tell City)

Links
- Public license information: Public file; LMS
- Webcast: Listen Live
- Website: WTCJ Online

WTCJ (1230 AM) is a radio station licensed to Tell City, Indiana. The station is owned and operated by Hancock Communications, Inc., doing business as the Cromwell Radio Group, and the station's broadcast license is held by Hancock Communications, Inc.

== History ==
The Federal communications Commission awarded a construction permit for a new radio station, with WTCJ as its assigned callsign to local businessman James Rowland Brewer on December 17, 1946. Under ownership by Brewer's newly-formed business, the Tell City Broadcasting Company, the station signed on in March 1948.

=== Recent developments ===
The station had been broadcasting an oldies format until August 1, 2014, when it switched to an adult hits format. The station launched an FM translator, Cannelton-licensed W227CO, that year.

On February 1, 2017, it began broadcasting an urban contemporary format as 93.3 The Vibe. This ended when it returned to their adult hits format in August 2020, this time as part of the Jack FM.

== Programming ==
WTCJ broadcasts an adult hits format.
