= WBUZ (FM) =

- La Vergne, Tennessee; United States
- Broadcast area: Nashville, Tennessee metropolitan area
- Frequency: 102.9 MHz (HD Radio)
- Branding: 102-9 The Buzz

Programming
- Format: Active rock/alternative rock
- Subchannels: HD2: WPRT-FM simulcast (Sports); HD3: "94.9 The Fan" (Sports); HD4: "Totally Hits Nashville" (Classic hits)
- Affiliations: Compass Media Networks

Ownership
- Owner: Cromwell Radio Group
- Sister stations: WPRT-FM, WQZQ

History
- First air date: May 1, 1962 (as WTCV)
- Former call signs: WTCV (1962–1980); WYCQ (1980–1995); WWKO (1995–1996); WMMU (1996); WZPC (1996–2001)
- Call sign meaning: "Buzz"

Technical information
- Licensing authority: FCC
- Facility ID: 74243
- Class: C1
- ERP: 100,000 watts
- HAAT: 291 meters (955 ft)
- Translator: See § Translators

Links
- Public license information: Public file; LMS
- Webcast: Listen Live; Listen Live (HD3); Listen Live (HD4)
- Website: 1029thebuzz.com WBUZ-HD3 Online totallyhitsnashville.com (HD4)

WBUZ (102.9 MHz, "102.9 The Buzz") is a commercial FM radio station licensed to La Vergne, Tennessee, and serving the Nashville, Tennessee metropolitan area. WBUZ airs an active rock music format, with elements of alternative rock, calling itself "Nashville's Rock Station." Weekday mornings, it carries the syndicated comedy and hot talk program "The Free Beer and Hot Wings Show." WBUZ is owned by Cromwell Radio Group, along with sports radio-formatted WPRT-FM and sports radio-formatted WQZQ. The radio studios and offices are on Murfreesboro Pike in Nashville, Tennessee.

WBUZ has an effective radiated power (ERP) of 100,000 watts. The transmitter is on Gene Underwood Road in Eagleville, Tennessee, about 30 miles (48 km) south of Nashville. WBUZ broadcasts using HD technology. It carries the sports programming of co-owned WPRT-FM "102.5 The Game" on its HD2 digital subchannel; and carries the sports programming of co-owned "94.9 The Fan", on its HD3 subchannel. WBUZ-HD3 "94.9 The Fan" is also broadcast via FM translator W235BW 94.9 MHz in Nashville; it carries a classic hits format branded as "Totally Hits Nashville" on its HD4 subchannel. WBUZ-HD4 "Totally Hits Nashville" is also broadcast via FM translator W236CI 95.1 MHz in Murfreesboro, Tennessee.

== History ==
On May 1, 1962, the station signed on the air in Shelbyville, Tennessee, a small city about 60 miles south of Nashville. The call sign was WTCV and it mostly simulcast co-owned WHAL (1400 AM, now WZNG). In 1980, it switched its call letters to WYCQ and it called itself "Q102" with a Top 40 format, but its signal did not cover Nashville. Management asked the Federal Communications Commission (FCC) to allow the transmitter to be moved north and to increase the power to 100,000 watts, so it could become part of the Nashville radio market.

With the boost in power and coverage, the station flipped to a hybrid Country/Southern Rock format known as "Rockin' Country 102.9". The station's mascot was an anthropomorphic cow playing an electric guitar, and the station eventually changed its name to "Moo 102" (WMMU) to match its mascot. The station then shifted toward a mainstream country format and became known as "PC103" and "Power Country 103", before settling on "Power Country 102.9" (WZPC).

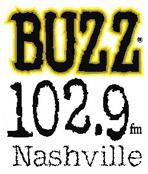
Former logo

On April 2, 1999 at 10:00 am, WZPC flipped to a rock-heavy Alternative format as "102-9 The Buzz," essentially "trading" formats with WKDF, which had flipped from rock to country the day prior. Ownership waited until 10:00 am that day to change formats in fear that another station might flip to a rock format that morning. The first song played on "The Buzz" was Closing Time by Semisonic. The station's call letters were changed to WBUZ on October 16, 2001. Over the years, the station shifted toward a Mainstream rock format, first using the slogan "Everything That Rocks!" and now calling itself "Nashville's Rock Station."

The Free Beer and Hot Wings Show from Grand Rapids replaced The Bob & Tom Show from Indianapolis as WBUZ's syndicated morning show on November 22, 2006.

In September 2010, WBUZ was named the new flagship station for the NHL's Nashville Predators. After the 2010–11 NHL season, its new all-sports sister station WPRT-FM became the team's radio flagship.

On June 13, 2022, WBUZ-HD3 changed its branding from "ESPN 94.9" to "94.9 The Fan".

== Translators ==
Broadcast translators for WBUZ-(FM) HD2-HD3-HD4
Call sign	Frequency	City of license	FID	ERP (W)	HAAT	Class	Transmitter coordinates	FCC info	Notes
W227DC	93.3 FM	Nashville, Tennessee	146836	250	212 m (696 ft)	D	36°8′27.2″N 86°51′56″W	LMS	Relays WBUZ-(FM) HD4
W235BW	94.9 FM	Nashville, Tennessee	142861	250	243 m (797 ft)	D	36°8′27″N 86°51′56″W	LMS	Relays WBUZ-(FM) HD3
W236CI	95.1 FM	Murfreesboro, Tennessee	141270	130	83 m (272 ft)	D	35°50′56″N 86°21′11″W	LMS	Relays WBUZ-(FM) HD4
W248BM	97.5 FM	Murfreesboro, Tennessee	140645	250	83 m (272 ft)	D	35°50′56″N 86°21′11″W	LMS	Relays WBUZ-(FM) HD2
W292ED	106.3 FM	Franklin, Tennessee	155680	149	139 m (456 ft)	D	35°49′39.6″N 86°50′25.6″W	LMS	Relays WBUZ-(FM) HD2

== History of callsign ==
The callsign WBUZ was originally assigned to a station in Bradbury Heights, Maryland. It began broadcasting January 1, 1948. WBUZ was the call sign of a former AM Top 40 station in Terre Haute, Indiana, from 1993 to 2000 (see WBOW (1230 AM)), and prior to that, an AM station in Fredonia, New York.

== See also ==
- List of Nashville media
