= WLME =

- Lewisport, Kentucky; United States
- Broadcast area: Owensboro, Kentucky
- Frequency: 102.7 MHz
- Branding: 102.7 The Game

Programming
- Format: Sports
- Affiliations: ESPN Radio

Ownership
- Owner: Cromwell Radio Group; (Hancock Communications, Inc.)
- Sister stations: WBIO, WKCM, WTCJ, WCJZ, WVJS, WXCM

History
- First air date: 1993 (as WKCM-FM)
- Former call signs: WKCM-FM (1990–1990); WKCM-FM (1990–1990); WKCM-FM (1990–1990); WLME-FM (1997–1997); WXCM (4/1997-6/1997)

Technical information
- Licensing authority: FCC
- Facility ID: 25962
- Class: A
- ERP: 2,250 watts
- HAAT: 166 meters (545 ft)
- Transmitter coordinates: 37°47′44″N 86°50′58″W

Links
- Public license information: Public file; LMS
- Webcast: Listen Live
- Website: WLME Online

WLME (102.7 FM, "102.7 The Game") is an American radio station licensed to serve the community of Lewisport, Kentucky. The station is owned and operated by Hancock Communications, Inc., doing business as the Cromwell Radio Group, and the station's broadcast license is held by Hancock Communications, Inc.

WLME broadcasts a sports talk format featuring programming from ESPN Radio to the greater Owensboro, Kentucky, area.

== History ==
The station was assigned call sign WKCM-FM on April 20, 1990. On October 19, 1993, the station changed its call sign to WKCM-FM, on October 20, 1993, to WKCM-FM, on February 20, 1997, to WLME-FM, on April 9, 1997, to WXCM, and on June 9, 1997, to WLME.

Former logo
