= WZUS =

Coordinates: 39°47′11″N 88°59′29″W

- Macon, Illinois; United States
- Broadcast area: Decatur Metropolitan Area
- Frequency: 100.9 MHz
- Branding: Talk 101 FM

Programming
- Format: Talk radio
- Affiliations: ABC News Radio; Compass Media Networks; Radio America; Westwood One

Ownership
- Owner: The Cromwell Radio Group, Inc. of Illinois
- Sister stations: WEJT, WYDS, WZNX

History
- First air date: 1977
- Former call signs: WKXK (1977–1989); WXKO-FM (1989–2000); WEGY (2000–2002)

Technical information
- Licensing authority: FCC
- Facility ID: 61225
- Class: A
- ERP: 6,000 watts
- HAAT: 100 meters (330 ft)

Links
- Public license information: Public file; LMS
- Webcast: Listen live
- Website: www.decaturradio.com/talk-101-fm

WZUS 100.9 (FM) is a commercial radio station licensed to Macon, Illinois, United States, and serves the Decatur Area. Owned by The Cromwell Group, Inc. of Illinois, it carries a talk format.

== History ==
The station signed on in 1977 as WKXK. Its original city of license was Pana, Illinois.

In 1989, the call letters changed to WXKO-FM and from 2000 to 2002, the call sign was WEGY.

== Programming ==
WZUS carries a local morning talk and farm news show, "Busboom & Wolfe." The rest of the weekday schedule is made up of nationally syndicated talk shows.
