= WXCM =

- Whitesville, Kentucky; United States
- Broadcast area: Owensboro, Kentucky
- Frequency: 97.1 MHz (HD Radio)
- Branding: 97X

Programming
- Format: Active rock
- Subchannels: HD2: Adult hits (WTCJ simulcast); HD3: Top 40 (CHR) "100.5 The Party"; HD4: News/talk "K-News 101.3"

Ownership
- Owner: Cromwell Radio Group; (Hancock Communications, Inc.)
- Sister stations: WBIO, WKCM, WLME, WTCJ, WCJZ, WVJS

History
- First air date: 1990
- Former call signs: WLME (1993–1997); WKCM (1997)

Technical information
- Licensing authority: FCC
- Facility ID: 73214
- Class: A
- ERP: 4,000 watts
- HAAT: 123 meters (404 feet)
- Transmitter coordinates: 37°41′50″N 86°59′28″W
- Translators: HD3: 100.5 W263BG (Owensboro); HD4: 101.3 W267BM (Hawesville)

Links
- Public license information: Public file; LMS
- Webcast: Listen Live; Listen Live (HD3); Listen Live (HD4)
- Website: WXCM Online; WXCM-HD3 Online; WXCM-HD4 Online

WXCM (97.1 FM, "97X") is an American radio station licensed to serve the community of Whitesville, Kentucky. The station is owned and operated by Hancock Communications, Inc., doing business as the Cromwell Radio Group.

Previous logo

WXCM broadcasts an active rock music format to the greater Owensboro, Kentucky, area. On January 4, 2010, the station began broadcasting the syndicated morning show "The Free Beer and Hot Wings Show" distributed by Compass Media Networks, but that show has since been discontinued due to low ratings.

The station was assigned the "WXCM" call letters by the Federal Communications Commission on June 9, 1997.

In May 2016, WXCM-HD3 launched a classic hip-hop format branded as “100.5 The Vibe”.

On August 24, 2024, at midnight, after playing "I Get Around" by 2Pac, WXCM-HD3/W263BG dropped its classic hip-hop format and began stunting with songs from Taylor Swift as “Taylor 100.5” in advance of an upcoming format change; the first song played during the stunting was "Shake It Off", and the final song played during the stunting was "…Ready For It". On August 30, 2024, at noon, the stunting ceased and WXCM-HD3/W263BG flipped to Top 40/CHR as “100.5 The Party”, the first song played on “The Party” was “Selfish” by Justin Timberlake.
