= WHQQ =

- Neoga, Illinois; United States
- Broadcast area: Effingham-Mattoon, Illinois
- Frequency: 98.9 MHz
- Branding: 98.9 The Game

Programming
- Format: Sports
- Affiliations: ESPN Radio

Ownership
- Owner: Cromwell Radio Group; (The Cromwell Group, Inc. of Illinois)
- Sister stations: WCRA, WCRC, WJKG

History
- First air date: 1996 (as WWGO)
- Former call signs: WWGO (1995–1997)

Technical information
- Licensing authority: FCC
- Facility ID: 73997
- Class: A
- ERP: 3,200 watts
- HAAT: 138 meters (453 ft)
- Transmitter coordinates: 39°14′59″N 88°22′48″W

Links
- Public license information: Public file; LMS
- Webcast: Listen LIve
- Website: Official Website

WHQQ (98.9 FM, "98.9 The Game") is a radio station licensed to serve Neoga, Illinois, United States. The station is owned by the Cromwell Radio Group and the broadcast license is held by The Cromwell Group, Inc. of Illinois.

WHQQ broadcasts a sports format branded as "The Game" to the greater Effingham-Mattoon, Illinois, area. The station most recent previous format was adult hits with the branding "98.9 Jack FM".

The station was assigned the WHQQ call sign by the Federal Communications Commission on October 31, 1997.
