= WPMB =

- Vandalia, Illinois; United States
- Frequency: 1500 kHz
- Branding: WPMB AM 1500-104.7 FM

Programming
- Format: Adult contemporary
- Affiliations: ABC News Radio

Ownership
- Owner: 170 Media, Inc.
- Sister stations: WKRV

History
- First air date: December 9, 1963
- Call sign meaning: We Play Music Better

Technical information
- Licensing authority: FCC
- Facility ID: 42091
- Class: D
- Power: 250 watts day 2 watts night
- Transmitter coordinates: type:city 38°57′28.00″N 89°07′22.00″W
- Translators: 102.7 W274CE (Greenville); 104.7 W284BI (Vandalia)

Links
- Public license information: Public file; LMS
- Webcast: Listen Live
- Website: WPMB Online

WPMB (1500 AM) is a radio station licensed to Vandalia, Illinois. The station broadcasts an adult contemporary format and is owned by 170 Media, Inc.

Logo before 102.7 translator sign on

== Translators ==
WPMB is also heard on 102.7 FM through a translator in Greenville, Illinois and on 104.7 FM through a translator in Vandalia, Illinois.

Call sign	Frequency	City of license	FID	ERP (W)	HAAT	Class	FCC info
W274CE	102.7 FM	Greenville, Illinois	200258	250	113 m (371 ft)	D	LMS
W284BI	104.7 FM	Vandalia, Illinois	139303	250 vertical	135.3 m (444 ft)	D	LMS
