= WQZQ =

- Goodlettsville, Tennessee; United States
- Broadcast area: Nashville metropolitan area
- Frequency: 830 kHz
- Branding: Sports Talk 830

Programming
- Format: Sports
- Affiliations: Fox Sports Radio; VSiN Radio; Nashville Sounds

Ownership
- Owner: Cromwell Radio Group; (WYCQ, Inc.)
- Sister stations: WPRT-FM, WBUZ

History
- First air date: 1980 (as WKVL)
- Former call signs: WKVL (1979–1988); WCTZ (1988–2005)

Technical information
- Licensing authority: FCC
- Facility ID: 72960
- Class: D
- Power: 2,000 watts day 3 watts night
- Transmitter coordinates: 36°12′29.8″N 86°52′20.8″W
- Repeater: 102.5 WPRT-HD3 (Pegram)

Links
- Public license information: Public file; LMS
- Webcast: Listen Live
- Website: WQZQ Online

WQZQ (830 AM) is a radio station licensed to Goodlettsville, Tennessee, and serving the Nashville metropolitan area. The station is owned by Cromwell Radio Group, through licensee WYCQ, Inc. It airs a sports radio format, calling itself "Sports Talk 830".

WQZQ transmits 2,000 watts by day but because 830 AM is a clear channel frequency, WQZQ must reduce power to 3 watts at night to protect Class A station WCCO in Minneapolis. The FM translator and repeater stations operate 24 hours a day. WQZQ's offices and studios are on Murfreesboro Pike in Nashville and its transmitter is located off Nesbitt Lane in Nashville.

== History ==
WQZQ began broadcasting in the 1970s as the FM sister station of Dickson, Tennessee community-oriented station WDKN. In the 1980s, the signal was upgraded and the station was split off from WDKN, which subsequently acquired another FM station. WQZQ began focusing on the Nashville market with a rock music format, Q-103. This station was the predecessor to current Nashville sports radio station "The Game" 102.5 WPRT-FM.

The call sign WQZQ was revived for a former black gospel AM station, which also broadcast Spanish language programming overnight at one point. It was this station that was converted to a sports format on February 5, 2013, when it became the Nashville-area affiliate of NBC Sports Radio. Then in September 2014, the affiliation was discontinued, due to a contract dispute between NBC Sports Radio and WQZQ. At that point WQZQ began broadcasting ESPN Radio programming along with its sister station WPRT-FM, when local or other syndicated programming was not being broadcast on the station.

On January 1, 2014, WQZQ began simulcasting on new FM translator W235BW 94.9.

On March 25, 2016, WQZQ began stunting with a non-stop loop of "Macarena" by Los del Rio and began simulcasting on FM translator 93.3 W241BU (now W227DC) in Nashville. (The "94.9 The Game 2" sports format continues on WBUZ-HD3 and W235BW 94.9 FM.) WQZQ officially launched a new classic hits format on April 1, 2016, branded as "93.3 Classic Hits".

In March 2024, WQZQ flipped back to sports, under the branding of "94.9 The Fan".

In November 2024, WQZQ rebranded as "Sports Talk 830".
