= Philpot, Kentucky =

Unincorporated community in Kentucky, United States

Coordinates: 37.733105°N 86.988883°W

Philpot
- Census-designated place
- Location within the state of Kentucky Philpot (the United States)
- Country: United States
- State: Kentucky
- County: Daviess

Area
  - Total: 3.31 sq mi (8.57 km^{2})
  - Land: 3.29 sq mi (8.51 km^{2})
  - Water: 0.023 sq mi (0.06 km^{2})

Population (2020)
  - Total: 991
  - Density: 301.8/sq mi (116.51/km^{2})
- Time zone: UTC-6 (Central (CST))
  - Summer (DST): UTC-5 (CST)
- FIPS code: 21-60654
- GNIS feature ID: 500543

Philpot is an unincorporated community in Daviess County, in the U.S. state of Kentucky. As of the 2020 census, Philpot had a population of 991.

== Demographics ==
Historical population
Census	Pop.	Note	%±
2020	991		—
U.S. Decennial Census

== History ==
A post office has been in operation under the name Philpot since the 1870s. Philpot was named for Augustus J. Philpot, an early settler.

== Education ==
Philpot used to have an elementary school until it closed down in 2005. Since then, elementary school students from Philpot attend Country Heights Elementary School, which is located on Kentucky Route 54 at the easternmost reaches of Owensboro.
