= Effingham, Illinois =

- City
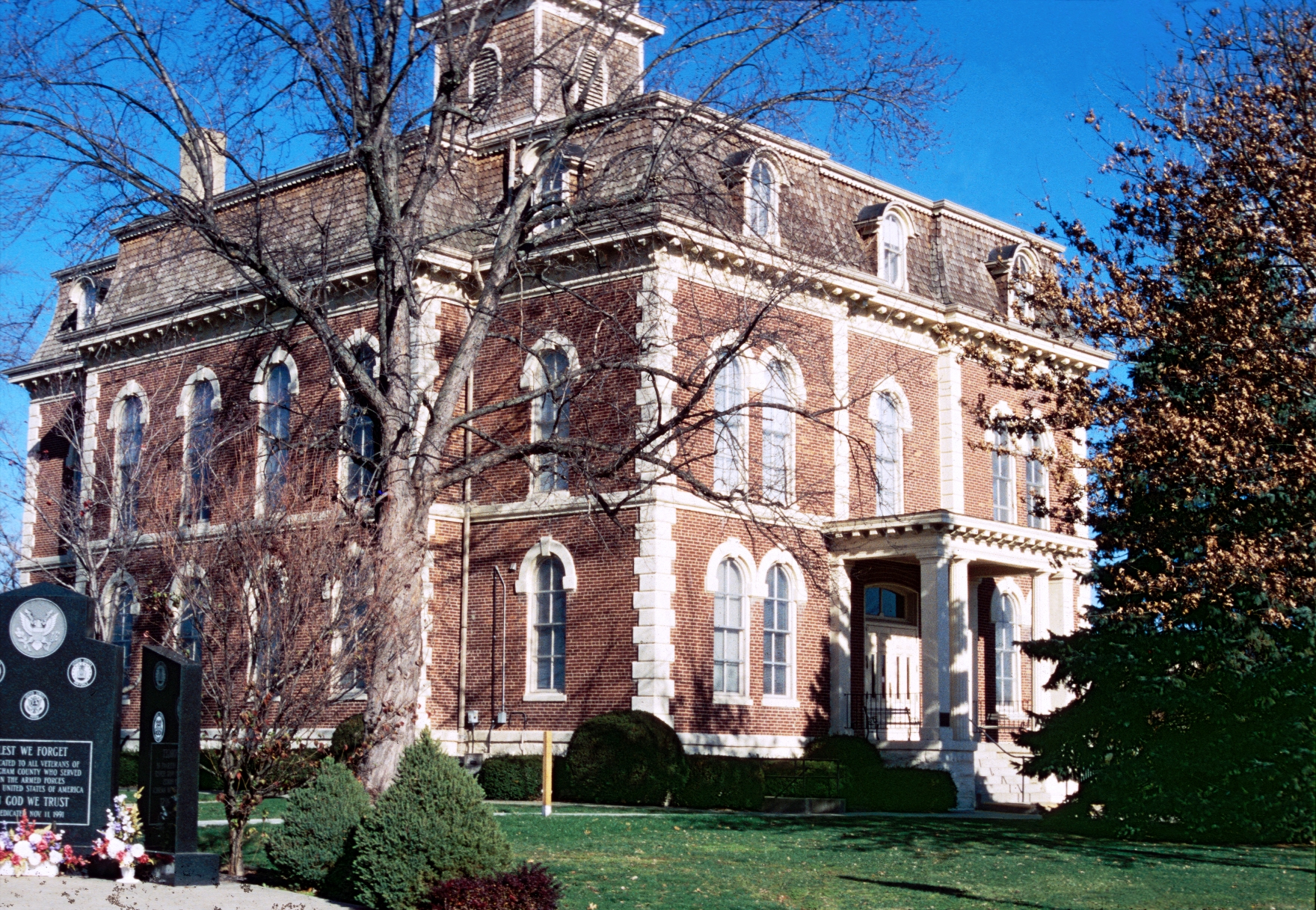
- The Old Effingham County Courthouse in the mid-2000s.
- Motto: "Crossroads of America"
- Interactive map of Effingham, Illinois
- Location within Illinois Location within the United States
- Coordinates: 39°07′42″N 88°32′57″W
- Country: United States
- State: Illinois
- County: Effingham

Area
  - Total: 10.56 sq mi (27.34 km^{2})
  - Land: 10.49 sq mi (27.16 km^{2})
  - Water: 0.069 sq mi (0.18 km^{2})
- Elevation: 594 ft (181 m)

Population (2020)
  - Total: 12,252
  - Density: 1,168.5/sq mi (451.16/km^{2})
- Time zone: UTC-6 (CST)
  - Summer (DST): UTC-5 (CDT)
- ZIP code: 62401
- Area codes: 217, 447
- FIPS code: 17-22736
- GNIS ID: 2394628
- Wikimedia Commons: Effingham, Illinois
- Website: www.effinghamil.com

Effingham is a city in Effingham County, Illinois, United States, and its county seat. It is in South Central Illinois. Its population was 12,252 at the 2020 census. It is the principal city of the Effingham micropolitan statistical area.

The city bills itself as "The Crossroads of Opportunity" because of its location at the intersection of two major Interstate highways: I-57 running from Chicago to Sikeston, Missouri, and I-70 running from Utah to Maryland. It is also served by U.S. Route 45, which runs from Ontonagon, Michigan to Mobile, Alabama; U.S. Route 40, the historic National Road, which stretches from Atlantic City, New Jersey to Silver Summit, Utah; and Illinois routes 32 and 33. It is also a major railroad junction, the crossing of the Illinois Central main line from Chicago to Memphis with the Pennsylvania Railroad line from Indianapolis to St. Louis. For this reason, Effingham has a much broader range of restaurants and lodging facilities than typical towns of its size.

== History ==
Effingham was first settled in 1814, and was known from then until 1859 as Broughton. In 1859, it became the county seat with buildings relocated from nearby (now deserted) Ewington. The community was named after General E. Effingham, a local surveyor.

In the late 1880s, local citizens founded Austin College, which lasted for several decades, and ultimately was purchased to become the Illinois College of Photography, also known as Bissel College. That school closed due to the Great Depression in the 1930s.

On April 4, 1949, St. Anthony's Hospital caught fire and burned to the ground, killing 74 people. As a result, fire codes nationwide were improved. Due to extensive media coverage, including a Life magazine cover story, donations for rebuilding the hospital came from all 48 states and several foreign countries.

Effingham was a sundown town; daytime segregation was enforced until at least the mid-1960s.

29 tornadoes have hit the town, the most powerful tornado up to date happened on June 17, 2026, rated EF-3. The path was 26 miles from north of town to the nearby town of Teutopolis.

== Geography ==
According to the 2022 census gazetteer files, Effingham has a total area of 10.56 square miles (27.35 km^{2}), of which 10.49 square miles (27.17 km^{2}) (or 99.34%) is land and 0.07 square miles (0.18 km^{2}) (or 0.66%) is water.

Effingham is served by a total of five highways, only two of them being interstates. Interstate 57 comes into Effingham County with Edgewood, Illinois. It officially comes into Effingham was a cross Directional T interchange with Interstate 70 west towards St. Louis. It runs concurrently with Interstate 57 as it goes through the city's southside exits. It makes its first with W Fayette Avenue and then takes a short curve east and makes a half diamond and half partial cloverleaf interchange with N Keller Drive and Illinois Route 33. After the interchange, it makes an interchange with U.S. Route 45 and the concurrency ends with a last Directional T interchange with Interstate 70. This time, Interstate 70 runs off east towards Indianapolis making Interstate 57 continue its route towards Mattoon, Illinois, Champaign, Illinois, and finally Chicago.

== Demographics ==
Historical population
Census	Pop.	Note	%±
1870	2,383		—
1880	3,065		28.6%
1890	3,260		6.4%
1900	3,774		15.8%
1910	3,898		3.3%
1920	4,024		3.2%
1930	4,978		23.7%
1940	6,180		24.1%
1950	6,892		11.5%
1960	8,172		18.6%
1970	9,458		15.7%
1980	11,270		19.2%
1990	11,851		5.2%
2000	12,384		4.5%
2010	12,328		−0.5%
2020	12,252		−0.6%
U.S. Decennial Census

=== 2020 census ===
As of the 2020 census, Effingham had a population of 12,252. The median age was 39.4 years. 22.1% of residents were under the age of 18 and 20.3% of residents were 65 years of age or older. For every 100 females there were 93.0 males, and for every 100 females age 18 and over there were 89.4 males age 18 and over.

98.6% of residents lived in urban areas, while 1.4% lived in rural areas.

There were 5,484 households in Effingham, of which 25.5% had children under the age of 18 living in them. Of all households, 39.1% were married-couple households, 21.2% were households with a male householder and no spouse or partner present, and 32.1% were households with a female householder and no spouse or partner present. About 38.7% of all households were made up of individuals and 16.1% had someone living alone who was 65 years of age or older.

There were 5,862 housing units, of which 6.4% were vacant. The homeowner vacancy rate was 1.8% and the rental vacancy rate was 6.2%.

Racial composition as of the 2020 census
Race	Number	Percent
White	11,149	91.0%
Black or African American	104	0.8%
American Indian and Alaska Native	31	0.3%
Asian	161	1.3%
Native Hawaiian and Other Pacific Islander	3	0.0%
Some other race	220	1.8%
Two or more races	584	4.8%
Hispanic or Latino (of any race)	563	4.6%

== Transportation ==
Effingham is historically important as a rail junction. The old Pennsylvania Railroad and the former Illinois Central Railroad crossed in downtown Effingham.

The former Illinois Central line was taken over by Canadian National in 1999, and the former Pennsylvania Railroad was taken over by Conrail, in turn this line is now operated by CSX.

Amtrak, the national passenger rail system, provides service to Effingham under the daily City of New Orleans route to New Orleans and Chicago, and the Saluki and Illini to Chicago and Carbondale. Until October 1, 1979, the station also served Amtrak's former National Limited line between Kansas City and New York City.

== Education ==
Effingham has several schools, both public and private. The private schools are both religiously affiliated and include Saint Anthony and Sacred Heart. Saint Anthony Grade School (SAGS) serves grades preschool (age 3+) to eighth grade. SAGS has the Bullpup as its mascot. Sacred Heart Grade School (SHS) serves preschool (age 3+) to eighth grade. SHS's mascot is the Shamrock. The public schools include the Early Learning Center, South Side Elementary, Central Grade School, Effingham Junior High School (EJHS), and Effingham High School. The Early Learning Center serves preschool and kindergarten age children. South Side Elementary serves first and second graders. Aspire is a school for students who are likely to drop out or those who get expelled. Central Grade School serves third through fifth grade students. Central Grade school's mascot is the Mustang. EJHS serves junior high students in grades six to eight. EJHS's mascot is the Mustang.

Effingham High School (EHS) is the public high school. The new EHS building opened in the fall of 1998, and has a current enrollment of 849. The former EHS building, built in 1939 as a WPA project and expanded in 1965, is currently the junior high, serving grades 6–8. The old junior high, Central School, is now a grade school serving grades 3–5. EHS athletics were originally known as the Warriors but the name was changed after Ada Kepley, a city resident, referred to Effingham as the "Heart of America" in a campaign to attract visitors to the city. The name stuck, with references in the city government and the downtown movie theater named the Heart Theater. EHS athletics are now known as the Flaming Hearts.

Effingham is also home to St. Anthony High School, a private Roman Catholic High School. SAHS athletics are known as the Bulldogs.

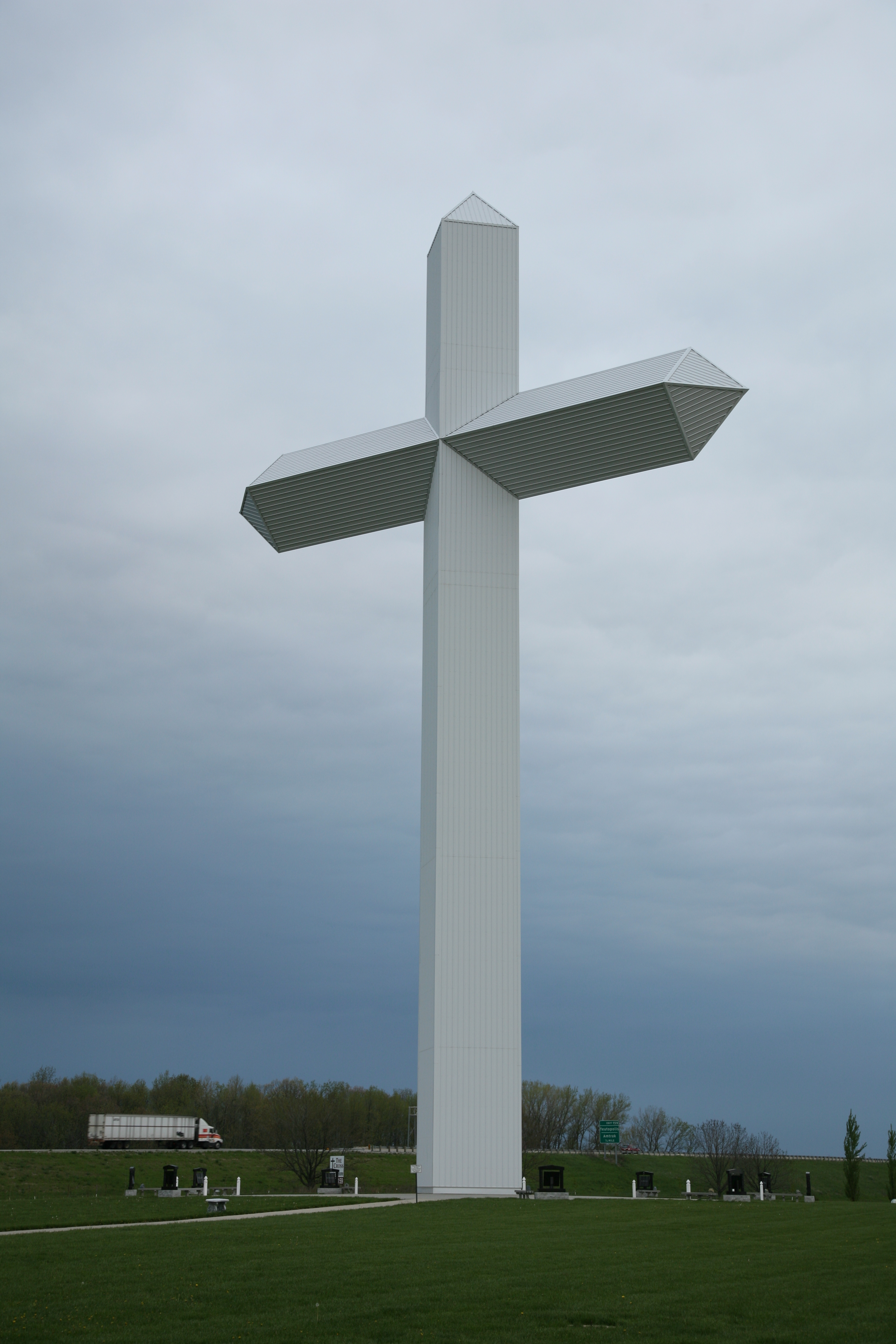
Cross at Interstate 57 and 70

== Monument ==
The Cross at the Crossroads, a 198-foot (60 m) steel cross erected by the Cross Foundation is located in Effingham and was inaugurated in 2001. The cross is made out of over 180 tons of steel and cost over $1 million. The Cross Foundation claims that the cross is the largest in the United States, standing at 198 feet (60 m) with a span of 113 feet (34 m).

== Notable people ==
- George J. Bauer, Illinois state representative
- Jack Berch, singer and radio personality; raised in Effingham
- Uwe Blab, basketball center for several teams; attended high school in Effingham
- Charles H. Constable, judge and Illinois state senator; died in Effingham
- Nick Gardewine, pitcher for the Texas Rangers
- Chad Green, pitcher for the New York Yankees
- Ada Kepley, first American woman to graduate from law school
- Jimmy Kite, driver with IndyCar and NASCAR
- Miles E. Mills, Illinois politician
- Mary Ann Brown Newcomb, Civil War nurse
- Brian Shouse, pitcher for two teams in Major League Baseball
- Daniel Winkler, pitcher for the Chicago Cubs
- Benson Wood, U.S. Congressman, 1895–1897

== In popular culture ==
Comedians and authors have poked fun at the "Effing" portion of the name Effingham and its use in North American and UK slang as a minced oath for the word "fuck". For example, radio comedians Bob and Tom produced a segment on their national radio show referencing Effingham. Ben Folds's album Way to Normal uses a similar play on words in a track that was inspired by driving past Effingham, although the song refers to the city as "Effington".

== See also ==
- List of sundown towns in the United States
